= Kansas Jayhawks =

Intercollegiate sports teams of the University of Kansas

- University: The University of Kansas
- NCAA: Division I (FBS)
- Conference: Big 12 Conference
- Athletic director: Travis Goff
- Location: Lawrence, Kansas
- Varsity teams: 18
- Football stadium: David Booth Kansas Memorial Stadium
- Basketball arena: Allen Fieldhouse
- Baseball stadium: Hoglund Ballpark
- Softball stadium: Arrocha Ballpark
- Soccer stadium: Rock Chalk Park
- Other venues: Anschutz Pavilion; Rim Rock Farm; Horejsi Family Volleyball Arena; Robinson Natatorium; Jayhawk Tennis Center; Kansas River Boathouse
- Colors: Crimson and blue
- Mascot: Big Jay and Baby Jay
- Fight song: I'm a Jayhawk
- Cheer: Rock Chalk, Jayhawk
- Website: https://kuathletics.com/

Big 12 logo in Kansas' colors

The Kansas Jayhawks, commonly referred to as simply KU or Kansas, are the athletic teams that represent the University of Kansas. KU is one of three schools in the state of Kansas that participate in NCAA Division I. The Jayhawks are also a member of the Big 12 Conference. KU athletic teams have won fifteen national championships all-time, with twelve of those being NCAA Division I championships: four in men's basketball, one in men's cross country, three in men's indoor track and field, three in men's outdoor track and field, and one in women's outdoor track and field. Kansas basketball also won two Helms Foundation National Titles in 1922 and 1923, and KU Bowling won the USBC National Title in 2004.

== Mascot ==
=== Origins of "Jayhawk" ===
The name "Jayhawk" comes from the Kansas Jayhawker militias during the Bleeding Kansas era of the American Civil War. The term became part of the lexicon of the Missouri–Kansas border in about 1858, during the Kansas territorial period, as these militia groups began to grow in Kansas.

A historian of the territorial period described the Jayhawkers as bands of men that were willing to fight, kill, and rob for a variety of motives, including defense against pro-slavery "Border Ruffians", abolition of slavery, driving pro-slavery settlers from Kansas Territory and their claims of land, Christianity, revenge, or plunder and personal profit.

In September 1861, the town of Osceola, Missouri, was burned to the ground by Jayhawkers during the Sacking of Osceola. On the 150th anniversary of that event in 2011, the town asked the University of Kansas to remove the Jayhawk as its mascot; although, the university refused.

Over time, proud of their state's contributions to the end of slavery and the preservation of the Union, Kansans embraced the "Jayhawker" term. The term came to be applied to people or items related to Kansas. When the University of Kansas fielded their first football team in 1890, like many universities at that time, they had no official mascot. They used many different independent mascots, including a pig. During the 1890s, the team was referred to as the Jayhawkers by the student body. Over time, the name was gradually supplanted by its shorter variant, and KU's sports teams are now almost exclusively known as the Jayhawks. The Jayhawk appears in several Kansas cheers, most notably, the "Rock Chalk, Jayhawk" chant in unison before and during games. In the traditions promoted by KU, the jayhawk is said to be a combination of two birds, "the blue jay, a noisy, quarrelsome thing known to rob other nests; and the sparrow hawk, a stealthy hunter."

The term Jayhawker was made famous in Clint Eastwood's movie The Outlaw Josey Wales. An older Kansas couple comes into a general store in Texas. The checker says, "The wheat is from Kansas and the molasses comes from Missouri." Grandma says, "Well sir we'll do without the molasses, anything from Missouri has a taint about it." Grandpa says, "Now, Grandma, you've got to tread lightly now that we're here in Texas. Lot of nice elements from Missouri coming West." Grandma responds, "Never heard of nice things from Missouri coming West, and treading lightly is not my way. We're from Kansas, Jayhawkers and proud of it."

The link between the term "Jayhawkers" and any specific kind of mythical bird, if it ever existed, had been lost or at least obscured by the time KU's bird mascot was invented in 1912. The originator of the first bird mascot, Henry Maloy, struggled for over two years to create a pictorial symbol for the team, until hitting upon the bird idea. As explained by Mr. Maloy, "the term 'jayhawk' in the school yell was a verb and the term 'jayhawkers' was the noun." KU's current Jayhawk tradition largely springs from Frank W. Blackmar, a KU professor. In his 1926 address on the origin of the Jayhawk, Blackmar specifically referenced the blue jay and sparrow hawk. Blackmar's address served to soften the link between KU's athletic team moniker and the Jayhawkers of the Kansas territorial period, and helped explain the relatively recently invented Jayhawk pictorial symbol with a myth that appears to have been of even more recent fabrication. More recently, however, the University and KU fans have again embraced the history of the Jayhawker moniker, with the football team, among other Varsity teams, donning civil war themed uniforms.

=== Costume mascots ===
Jayhawks Big Jay and Baby Jay are the costume mascots used by the University of Kansas.

Another Jayhawk costume mascot was Centennial Jay, or C Jay. C Jay was created by student cartoonist Henry Maloy and featured in the University Daily Kansan in 1912. Maloy's depiction of the Jayhawk helped answer the question of what the mythical bird would look like. When asked why he gave the bird shoes Maloy responded, "Why? For kicking opponents, of course." C Jay was reintroduced as a full-sized mascot on February 25, 2012 in the final Border War against Missouri to celebrate the 100th anniversary of the Jayhawk. C Jay was used only in 2012 for the 100-year anniversary of the original Jayhawk design.

== Sports sponsored ==
| Men's sports | Women's sports |
|---|---|
| Baseball | Basketball |
| Basketball | Cross country |
| Cross country | Golf |
| Football | Rowing |
| Golf | Soccer |
| Track and field^{1} | Softball |
| | Swimming and diving |
| | Tennis |
| | Track and field^{1} |
| | Volleyball |
^{1} – includes both indoor and outdoor.

The University of Kansas officially sponsors 16 sports: 6 men's and 10 women's. There are also club-level sports for rugby, ice hockey, and men's volleyball. The school used to sponsor a wrestling team, though the sport was discontinued during the 1960s.

=== Basketball ===
==== Men's basketball ====
The Jayhawks men's NCAA basketball program is one of the most successful and prestigious programs in the history of college basketball. The Jayhawks' first coach was the inventor of the game, James Naismith. The program has produced some of the game's greatest professional players (including Clyde Lovellette, Wilt Chamberlain, Joel Embiid, Jo Jo White, and Paul Pierce) and most successful coaches (including Phog Allen, Adolph Rupp, Ralph Miller, Dutch Lonborg, John McLendon, Larry Brown, Dean Smith, Roy Williams, and Bill Self). The program has enjoyed considerable national success, having been retrospectively awarded Helms Foundation titles for the 1922 and 1923 seasons, winning NCAA national championships in 1952, 1988, 2008, and 2022, and playing in 16 Final Fours. The Kansas Jayhawks men's basketball team is one of only three programs to win more than 2,000 games. KU ranked 4th in Street & Smith's Annual list of 100 greatest college basketball programs of all time in 2005.

==== Women's basketball ====
Kansas first fielded a women's team during the 1968–69 season. For thirty-one seasons (1973–2004) the women's team was coached by Marian Washington, who led the team to three Big Eight championships, one Big 12 Championship, six conference tournament championships, eleven NCAA Tournament appearances and four AIAW Tournament appearances. The team's best post-season result was a Sweet Sixteen appearance in 1998. Bonnie Henrickson served as head coach from 2004 to 2015, until she was fired in March 2015. Brandon Schneider was hired to replace Henrickson in April 2015.

=== Football ===
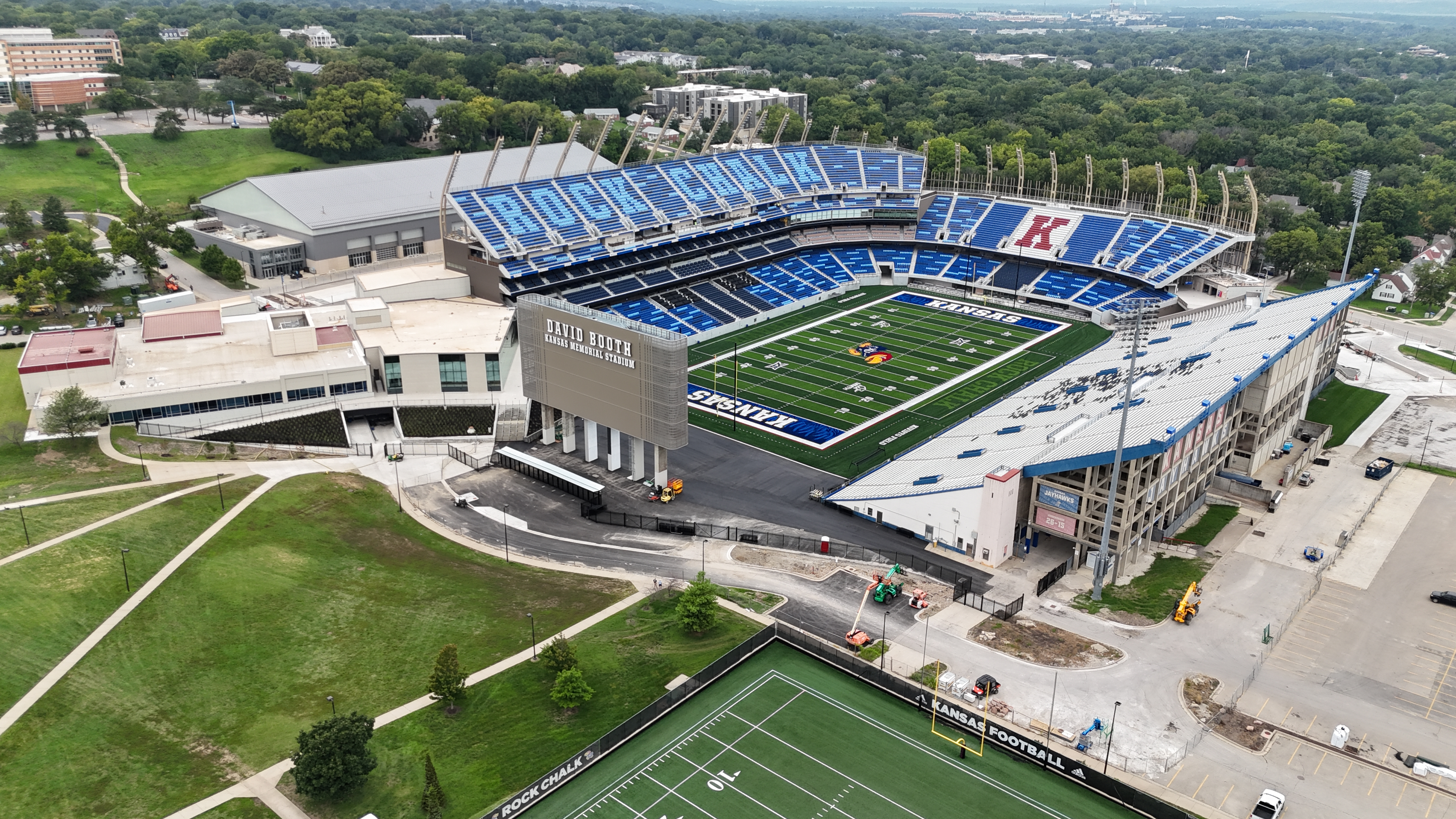
The first phase of the renovation has been completed. The new west and north stands can be seen in this August 2025 photo. The east stands will be torn down and rebuilt in the second phase.

KU began playing football in 1890. The football team has had notable alumni including Gale Sayers, a two-time All-American who later enjoyed an injury-shortened yet Hall of Fame career with the Chicago Bears; John Riggins, another Pro Football Hall of Famer and Super Bowl XVII MVP with the Washington Redskins; Pro Football Hall of Famer for the Cleveland Browns, Mike McCormack. Additional notable former Jayhawks John Hadl, Curtis McClinton, Dana Stubblefield, Bobby Douglass, Nolan Cromwell, and former NFL cornerbacks Aqib Talib and Chris Harris Jr. The Jayhawks have appeared three times in the Orange Bowl, 1948, 1969 and 2008, winning in 2008. The team currently plays in Memorial Stadium (capacity 50,071), the seventh oldest college football stadium in the nation, which opened in 1921. Clint Bowen was named interim head coach after Charlie Weis was fired September 28, 2014. On December 5, 2014, David Beaty was announced as the next head football coach.

=== Baseball ===
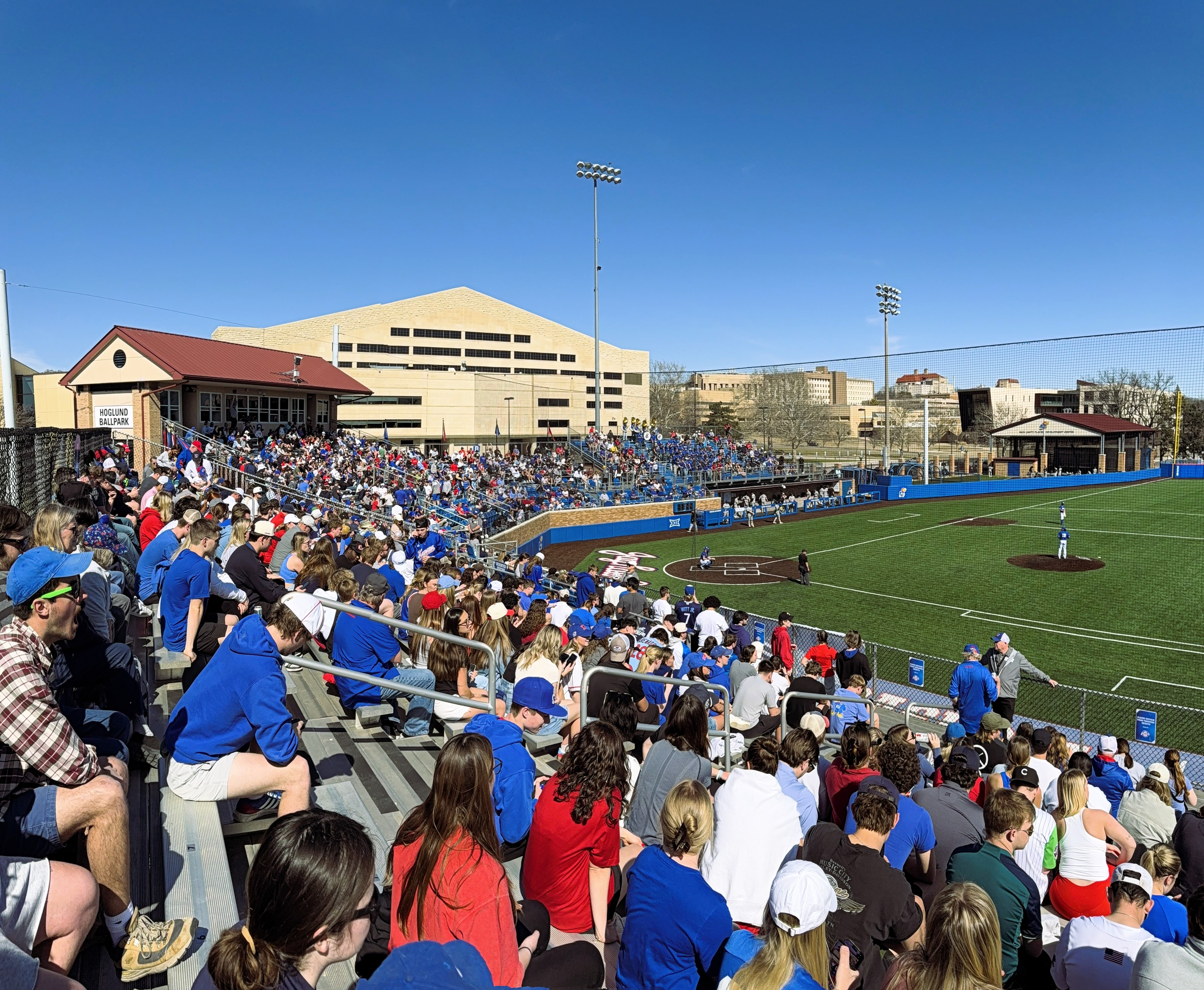
The Jayhawks playing during the 2025 season at Hoglund Ballpark

Kansas baseball began in 1867, and in 1880 became a varsity sport. It is one of the oldest intercollegiate college baseball programs in the United States. It produced notable players such as Bob Allison and Steve Renko. The team has appeared in five NCAA tournaments (1993, 1994, 2006, 2009, 2014) and one College World Series (1993). As of March 11, 2025 the team holds a 2,071-1,991-18 record.

=== Softball ===
The Jayhawks softball team has appeared in seven Women's College World Series, including five straight from 1973–77, as well as 1979 and 1992.

=== Golf ===
In 1949, Marilynn Smith won the women's individual intercollegiate golf championship (an event conducted by the Division of Girls' and Women's Sports (DGWS) — which later evolved into the current NCAA women's golf championship). In 2025, Kansas won the Columbus Regional, securing an appearance in the NCAA Championship and claiming the first regional championship in program history.

=== Soccer ===
Women's soccer at the University of Kansas got its start in 1995, and they play their games at Rock Chalk Park in northwest Lawrence, Kansas. The stadium holds 2,500 people, making it one of the larger stadiums in the Big 12 for soccer. The team is coached by Mark Francis, who is in his 25th season at KU as of 2023, with a record of 258-192-43. The team's overall record since 1995 is 283-240-46, with two Big 12 conference titles, a divisional title, and 9 appearances in the NCAA tournament.

== Notable non-varsity sports ==
=== Rugby ===
Founded in 1964, Kansas Jayhawks Rugby Football Club plays college rugby in the Division 1 Heart of America conference against its many of its traditional Big 8 / Big 12 rivals such as Kansas State and Missouri. Kansas finished the 2011 year ranked 24th. Kansas rugby has embarked on international tours since 1977, playing in Europe, New Zealand, South Africa, Belgium, Holland, Scotland, England, Ireland and Argentina. The team plays its matches at the Westwick Rugby Complex, which was funded by $350,000 in alumni donations. Kansas often hosts the annual Heart of America sevens tournament played every September, the winner of which qualifies for the USA Rugby sevens national championship. Notable University of Kansas rugby all-Americans are: Pete Knudsen 1986, Paul King 1989–90, Anthony Rio 1992, Philip Olson 1993 all American, Joel Foster 1993, Collin Gotham 1993. In 2022 the club played in the USA Rugby D1AA spring national championship game, falling to Fresno State, 22–17.

=== Ice hockey ===
Competing in the ACHA, the Kansas Jayhawks Club Ice Hockey team has seen a resurgence in popularity since the team started scheduling games against historical rivals Missouri and Nebraska, starting on an annualized basis in 2013. The team is coached by Andy McConnell.

The team's primary logo is the traditional Kansas Jayhawk logo, with the secondary logo paying homage to the Vancouver Canucks classic logo, with the outline of the state of Kansas having a hockey stick running through the middle of it.

== Championships ==
=== Conference championships and titles ===
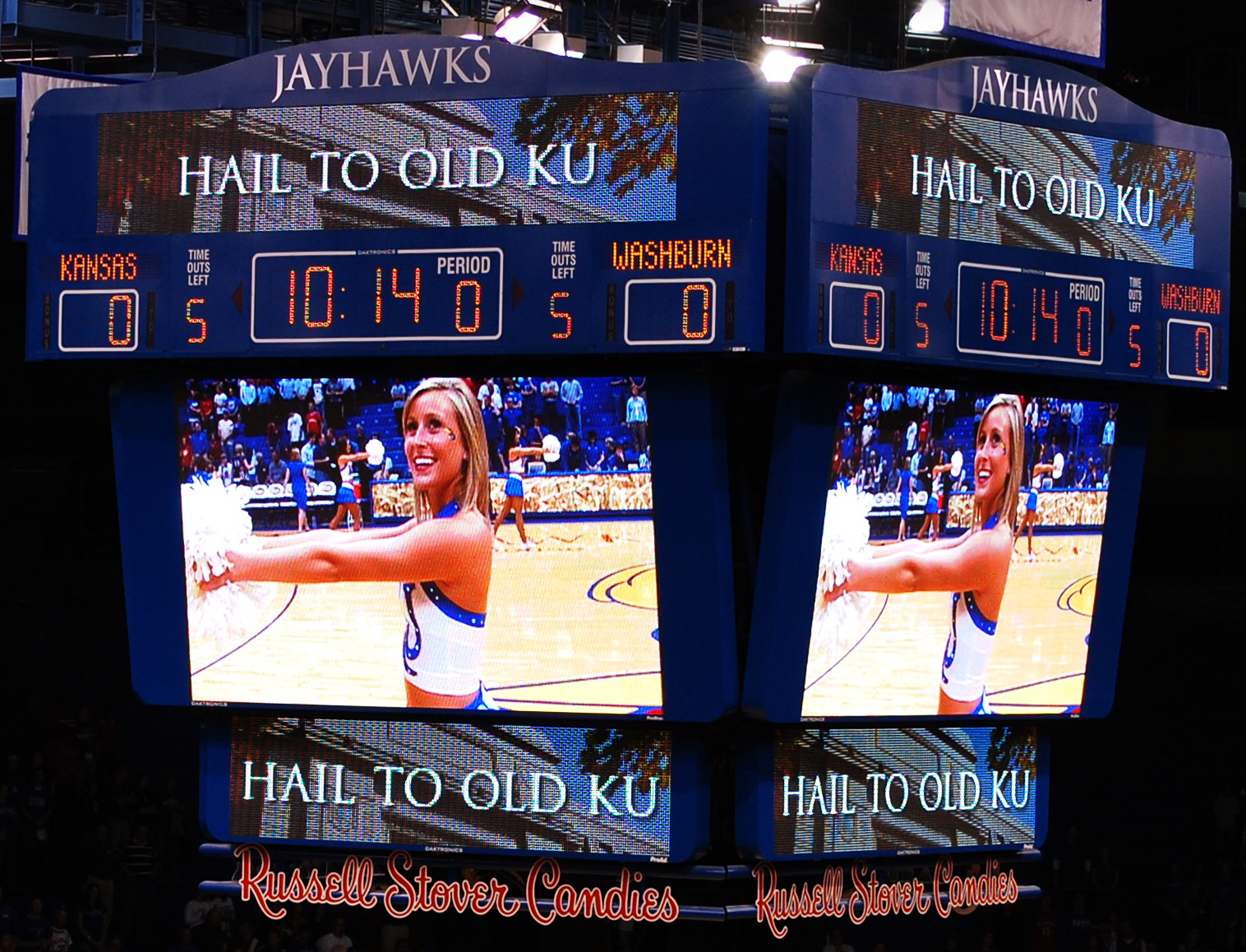
Cheering on the champions.

The Jayhawks have won 177 conference championships across all sports in university history as of December 2024.

Big 12 Conference champions in men's basketball, women's basketball, baseball, softball, and volleyball have the best conference regular season record, and conference tournament titles are awarded to the winner of the postseason championship tournament in men's basketball, baseball, softball, women's basketball, women's soccer, and tennis. Big 12 postseason championship games and matches are played in rowing, track and field, cross country, and football.

Men's basketball

The Jayhawks have won or shared an NCAA record 63 conference championships since they joined their first conference in 1907. The Jayhawks have belonged to the Big 12 Conference since it was formed, before the 1996–97 season, and dominated it, winning 12 straight conference titles dating back to 2005. Before that, the Jayhawks have belonged to the Missouri Valley Intercollegiate Athletic Association from the 1907–08 to 1927–28 seasons, the Big Six Conference from 1928–29 to 1946–47, the Big Seven Conference from 1947–48 to 1957–58, the Big Eight Conference from 1958–59 up until the end of the 1995–96 season. The Big Six and Big Seven conferences were actually the more often used names of the Missouri Valley Intercollegiate Athletic Association, which existed under that official name until 1964, when it was changed to the Big Eight.

Missouri Valley Intercollegiate Athletic Association (13)

- 1908, 1909, 1910, 1911, 1912, 1914, 1915, 1922, 1923, 1924, 1925, 1926, 1927

Big Six Conference (12)

- 1931, 1932, 1933, 1934, 1936, 1937, 1938, 1940, 1941, 1942, 1943, 1946

Big Seven Conference (5)

- 1950, 1952, 1953, 1954, 1957

Big Eight Conference (13)

- 1960, 1966, 1967, 1971, 1974, 1975, 1978, 1986, 1991, 1992, 1993, 1995, 1996

Big 12 Conference (20)

- 1997, 1998, 2002, 2003, 2005, 2006, 2007, 2008, 2009, 2010, 2011, 2012, 2013, 2014, 2015, 2016, 2017, 2020, 2022, 2023

In addition to the 63 regular season conference championships, the Jayhawks have also won 28 conference tournament championships:

Big 7 Holiday Tournament (4)

- 1951, 1953, 1956, 1957,

Big 8 Holiday Tournament (9)

- 1962, 1964, 1965, 1966, 1968, 1970, 1974, 1977, 1978,

Big 8 Postseason Tournament (4)

- 1981, 1984, 1986, 1992,

Big 12 Postseason Tournament (12)

- 1997, 1998, 1999, 2006, 2007, 2008, 2010, 2011, 2013, 2016, 2022

Football
1908 - MVIAA champion
1923 - MVIAA champion
1930 - Big 6 champion
1946 - Big 6 champion
1947 - Big 7 champion
1968 - Big 8 champion

Women's basketball
1979 – Big 8 tournament champion
1980 – Big 8 tournament champion
1981 – Big 8 tournament champion
1987 – Big 8 regular season and tournament champion
1988 – Big 8 tournament champion
1992 – Big 8 regular season champion
1993 – Big 8 tournament champion
1996 – Big 8 regular season champion
1997 – Big 12 champion

Baseball
1922 – MVIAA champion
1923 – MVIAA champion
1949 – Big 7 champion
2006 – Big 12 tournament champion
2026 - Big 12 regular season and tournament champion

Soccer
2004 – Big 12 regular season co-champion
2019 - Big 12 tournament champion
2024 – Big 12 tournament champion

Softball
2006 – Big 12 tournament champion

Men's indoor track and field
1922, 1923, 1934, 1950, 1952, 1953, 1954, 1955, 1956, 1957, 1958, 1959, 1961, 1962, 1966, 1967, 1968, 1969, 1970, 1971, 1975, 1977, 1978, 1980, 1981, 1982, 1983

Women's indoor track and field
2013

Men's outdoor track and field
1910, 1927, 1928, 1930, 1931, 1934, 1946, 1952, 1953, 1954, 1955, 1956, 1957, 1958, 1959, 1960, 1963, 1964, 1965, 1967, 1968, 1969, 1970, 1971, 1972, 1973, 1974, 1975, 1976, 1977, 1979, 1980, 1982

Women's outdoor track and field
2013

Men's cross country
1928, 1947, 1948, 1949, 1950, 1951, 1952, 1953, 1954, 1955, 1956, 1957, 1958, 1959, 1961, 1963, 1964, 1968, 1969

Men's golf
1999

Tennis
1979, 1992, 1993, 1994, 1995, 1996, 2019

Women's volleyball
2016

=== National championships ===
Kansas has won 12 NCAA team national championships and 3 non-NCAA National Championships. Eleven of the twelve NCAA Championships have come from men's sports teams. The sole women's National Championship was from the outdoor track team in 2013. The last team National Championship was from the men's basketball team in 2022. Five different sports have won at least one championship.

==== NCAA team championships ====
- Men (11)
  - Basketball (4): 1952, 1988, 2008, 2022
  - Cross country (1): 1953
  - Indoor track and field (3): 1966, 1969, 1970
  - Outdoor track and field (3): 1959, 1960, 1970
- Women (1)
  - Outdoor track and field (1): 2013

==== Non-NCAA team championships ====
The Jayhawks have also won three national titles not awarded by the NCAA:

- Men's Bowling (1): 2004 (USBC intercollegiate champions)
- Men's Basketball (2): 1922, 1923 (Helms Athletic Foundation retrospective selections)

== Rivalries ==
=== Kansas State Wildcats (Sunflower Showdown) ===
Kansas State University is Kansas' in-state rival. The series between Kansas and Kansas State is known as the Sunflower Showdown.

=== Missouri Tigers (Border War) ===
The 160-year-old rivalry between Kansas and Missouri began with open violence that up to the American Civil War known as Bleeding Kansas that took place in the Kansas Territory (Sacking of Lawrence) and the western frontier towns of Missouri throughout the 1850s. The incidents were clashes between pro-slavery factions from both states and anti-slavery Kansans to influence whether Kansas would enter the Union as a free or slave state. In the opening year of the war, six Missouri towns (the largest being Osceola) and large swaths of the western Missouri country side were plundered and burned by guerrilla "Jayhawkers" from Kansas. The Sacking of Osceola led to a retaliatory raid on Lawrence, Kansas two years later known as the Lawrence Massacre killing between 185 and 200 men and boys, which in turn led to the infamous General Order No. 11 (1863), the forced depopulation of several western Missouri counties. The raid on Lawrence was led by William Quantrill, a Confederate guerrilla born in Ohio who had formed his bushwhacker group at the end of 1861. At the time the Civil War broke out, Quantrill was a resident of Lawrence, Kansas teaching school.

The athletic rivalry began with a football game on October 31, 1891. Currently, it is the second longest played series in Division I football and has been described as one of the most intense in the nation. However, no regular season games were scheduled after Missouri accepted an offer to join the Southeastern Conference and Kansas refused Missouri's offer to continue rivalry outside of the conference. In the basketball series Kansas leads by a large margin (172-95 KU), in football Missouri leads by a very small margin (56-55-9 MU) and baseball Missouri leads by a large margin. Regular season games have been scheduled for basketball beginning in 2020 and football in 2025 for the first time since Missouri left for the SEC.

=== Dormant rivalries ===
==== Nebraska Cornhuskers ====
Kansas had a rivalry with the Nebraska Cornhuskers, though that rivalry had more to do with who had the better sports program, with Kansas priding itself on its basketball prowess and Nebraska on its football dominance. This rivalry of sports cultures has gone dormant with Nebraska's departure for the Big Ten Conference in 2011. Prior to 2011, the football series between the 2 schools was the 3rd most played rivalry in college football behind Minnesota-Wisconsin and Kansas-Missouri. In basketball, Kansas leads the all-time series 170–71.

== Notable athletes ==
This list below is for Olympic medalists and Hall of Famers in their respective sport, with a single exception. For a more comprehensive list of notable athletes see List of University of Kansas people § Athletes and coaches.

- Phog Allen played basketball at KU under James Naismith. He was known as the "Father of Basketball Coaching" as he coached and mentored Hall of Fame coaches Dutch Lonberg, Adolph Rupp, Ralph Miller, and Dean Smith. Allen, Lonberg, Rupp, Miller, and Smith (all KU alumni and basketball players) amassed 3,481 career wins as head coaches. No other five alumni from any other school come close to this figure. When Allen retired he was the leader in all-time wins (746) until passed by Rupp, who held it until passed by Smith. Allen also founded the National Association of Basketball Coaches (NABC) in 1927, which went on to create the NCAA Tournament in 1939. While at Kansas, he coached the football and baseball teams. He is the namesake for the basketball arena at Kansas, Allen Fieldhouse.
- Bob Dole, known his political career, was a football and basketball player for the Jayhawks, but did not have any major accomplishments as an athlete. He served as senator from Kansas for 27 years, resigning to focus on his presidential campaign. He was the Republican Party nomination for the 1996 presidential election and lost to incumbent Bill Clinton.
- Wilt Chamberlain, two-time All American, Final Four MVP, National Basketball Hall of Fame, Top 50 All Time Greatest NBA players
- Jon Cornish, 2006 First Team All-Big 12, second round draft pick of the Calgary Stampeders, Canadian Football Hall of Famer
- Glenn Cunningham, two-time US Olympic Runner, Silver Medalist 1936 Berlin Olympics, dominant runner of the 1930s
- Bill "Skinny" Johnson, Basketball player, 2-time All-Big 6. Member basketball Hall of Fame.
- Clyde Lovellette, Basketball player, led KU to the 1952 NCAA Tournament championship. The only player in NCAA history to lead the nation in scoring and then win the National Championship in the same season. 1952 NCAA Tournament Most Outstanding Player. Scored a then record 141 points in the 1952 NCAA Tournament. 3-time All-American (twice Consensus All-American) and 1952 Helms College Player of the Year. 1952 Olympic Gold Medalist while earning the Most Outstanding Player and leading the team in scoring. 9th overall pick in the 1952 NBA Draft. 4-time NBA All Star, 3-time NBA champion, and Basketball Hall of Fame member.
- Danny Manning, Basketball player and former head basketball coach at Wake Forest. Two-time All-American 1988 recipient of the Naismith and Wooden Awards, Big 8 Player of the Decade for the 1980s, 2-time NBA All-Star, National Collegiate Basketball Hall Of Famer.
- Mike McCormack, Pro Football Hall of Fame tackle. Former NFL head coach and GM.
- Ralph Miller, Basketball and Football player at KU. All Big-Six conference quarterback on the football team. Assistant under Phog Allen. Went on to become Basketball Hall of Famer as a head coach with 657 wins.
- Billy Mills, First American to win gold medal in the 10,000 m run, 1964 Tokyo Olympic Games
- Bill Nieder, Former record holder in High School shot put, first college Athlete to surpass 60 feet with the 16-pound shot, two National championships, Silver Medal 1956 Melbourne Olympic Games, Gold Medal 1960 Rome Olympic Games
- Al Oerter, Olympic gold medal discus thrower in four consecutive Olympiads
- John Riggins, Pro Football Hall of Fame running back, MVP of Super Bowl XVII
- Adolph Rupp, Basketball Player under Phog Allen. Member of 1922 and 1923 Helms Foundation title teams. Retired as winningest college basketball head coach with 876 wins. Member of Basketball Hall of Fame.
- Jim Ryun, World record holder in mile, Olympic silver medalist, former Congressman
- Gale Sayers, 2-time All American, Pro Football Hall of Fame running back, Chicago Bears
- Dean Smith played basketball under Phog Allen. Also played baseball. Played on the 1952 National Championship Basketball Team. Assistant Coach at KU for 1 season. Retired as winningest college basketball head coach with 879 wins Member of Basketball Hall of Fame.
- Marilynn Smith, 21-time winner on the LPGA Tour. Inducted into the World Golf Hall of Fame in 2006
- Lynette Woodard, 4-time All-American, Major college basketball's career Women's Scoring leader, Gold Medalist 1984 Los Angeles Olympic Games, First woman ever to play with Harlem Globetrotters, WNBA player, former assistant and interim head coach for the Kansas Jayhawks, National Basketball Hall of Fame, Women's Basketball Hall of Fame

== Athletic directors ==
Kansas has had 16 full-time athletic directors and 8 interim athletic directors. W. O. Hamilton was the first official athletic director. Travis Goff has served as the athletic director since 2021. Longtime men's basketball coach Phog Allen also served as athletic director for 18 years.

- W. O. Hamilton, 1911–1919
- Phog Allen, 1919–1937
- Gwinn Henry, 1938–1942
- Karl Klooz, 1943 (interim)
- Ernie Quigley, 1944–1949
- Arthur Lonborg, 1950–1963
- Wade R. Stinson, 1964–1972
- Clyde Walker, 1973–1977
- Bob Marcum, 1978–1981
- Del Shankel, 1981 (interim)
- Jim Lessig, 1982
- Del Shankel, 1982 (interim)
- Monte Johnson, 1982–1987
- Bob Frederick, 1987–2001
- Richard Konzem, 2001 (interim)
- Allen Bohl, 2001–2003
- Drue Jennings, 2003 (interim)
- Lew Perkins, 2003–2010
- Sean Lester, 2010–2011 (interim)
- Sheahon Zenger, 2011–2018
- Sean Lester – 2018 (interim)
- Jeff Long, 2018–2021
- Kurt Watson, (interim) 2021
- Travis Goff, 2021–present

== Athletic department revenue ==
Total revenue includes Ticket sales, contributions and donations, rights and licensing, student fees, school funds and all other sources including TV income, camp income, concessions, and novelties.

Total expenses includes coach and staff salaries, scholarships, buildings and grounds, maintenance, utilities and rental fees, recruiting, team travel, equipment and uniforms, conference dues, and insurance.

The following table shows the KU Athletics audit reports to the NCAA for each of the years shown.

| Fiscal Year | Total Operating Revenue | Total Operating Expenses |
|---|---|---|
| 2017-2018 | $106,307,326 | $104,108,072 |
| 2018-2019 | $121,553,307 | $108,881,800 |
| 2019-2020 | $102,707,575 | $102,693,011 |
| 2020-2021 | $92,325,635 | $94,140,743 |
| 2021-2022 | $118,020,175 | $108,696,078 |
| 2022-2023 | $128,398,186 | $124,210,259 |
| 2023-2024 | $135,189,512 | $138,091,318 |
| 2024-2025 | $143,856,096 | $148,361,190 |

== See also ==
- Budig Hall § Hoch Auditorium – Home to the basketball teams from 1927 to 1955
- Robinson Gymnasium – Home to the men's basketball team from 1907 to 1927

== Sources ==
- Falkenstien, Max; Vance, Doug (1996). Max and the Jayhawks: 50 Years on and off the Air with KU Sports. Wichita, Kansas: The Wichita Eagle & Beacon Publishing Company.
