= Kansas Jayhawks football =

American football team of the University of Kansas

2026 Kansas Jayhawks football team
- First season: 1890; 136 years ago
- Athletic director: Travis Goff
- Head coach: Lance Leipold; 5th season, 24–28 (.462)
- Location: Lawrence, Kansas
- Stadium: David Booth Kansas Memorial Stadium (capacity: 32,000)
- NCAA division: Division I FBS
- Conference: Big 12
- Colors: Crimson and blue
- All-time record: 619–700–58 (.471)
- Bowl record: 7–7 (.500)

Conference championships
- MVIAA: 1908, 1923 Big Eight: 1930, 1946, 1947, 1968

Division championships
- Big 12 North: 2007
- Consensus All-Americans: 13
- Rivalries: Missouri (The Border War); Kansas State (The Sunflower Showdown); Nebraska (rivalry)

Uniforms
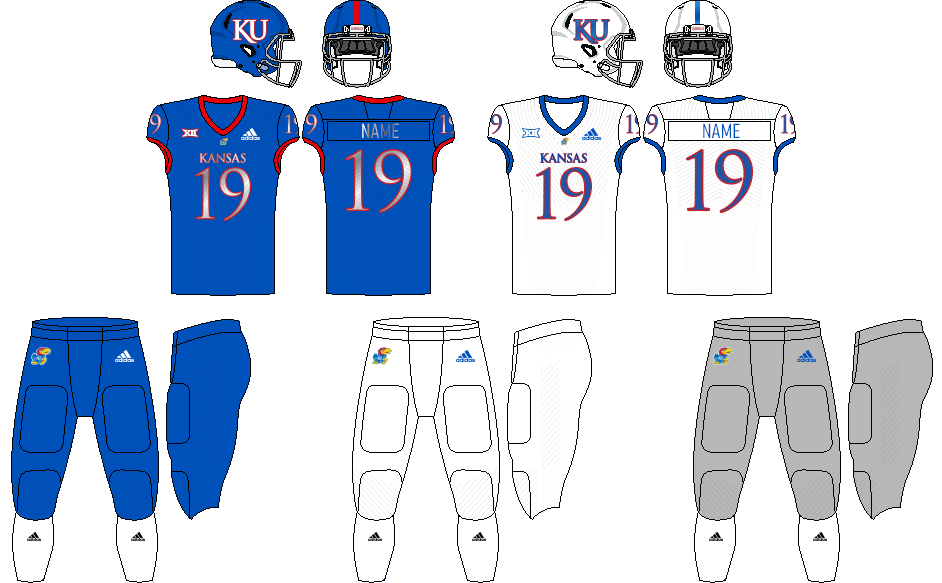
- Fight song: "I'm a Jayhawk"
- Mascot: Big Jay, Baby Jay
- Marching band: Marching Jayhawks
- Website: kuathletics.com

The Kansas Jayhawks football program is the intercollegiate football program of the University of Kansas. The program is classified in the National Collegiate Athletic Association (NCAA) Division I Bowl Subdivision (FBS), and the team competes in the Big 12 Conference. The Jayhawks are led by head coach Lance Leipold.

The program's first season was 1890, making it one of the oldest college football programs. The team's home field is David Booth Kansas Memorial Stadium, which opened in 1921 and is one of the oldest college football stadiums in the nation. Until 2014, Memorial Stadium was one of the few football stadiums in Division I that had a track encircling the field. The track was removed in 2014, as the university's newly built Rock Chalk Park sports complex opened for use by the school's outdoor track and field team. In 2019, immediately adjacent to the west of the stadium, the University of Kansas Football Indoor Practice Facility was completed. The facility was built using only private donations from University of Kansas alumni, most notably David Booth.

KU's all-time record is 610–686–58 as of the conclusion of the 2024 season. The program saw a re-emergence under head coach Mark Mangino who won 50 games in eight seasons. From the departure of Mangino to 2021, the Jayhawks struggled to meet the same success as under Mangino. The program's overall record in that time frame was 22–111 (.165 win percentage). They also never won more than three games and never more than a single conference win during that time frame. They also had two winless seasons and five losing streaks of 10 or more games. The Jayhawks also lost 46 straight road games from the final year under Mangino to 2018 and 56 straight road conference games which spanned from 2009 to 2021. The Jayhawks had a streak of 44 consecutive losses to teams ranked in the AP poll that stood from a loss to 24th ranked Oklahoma in 2009 until the 2022 Season when they beat 18th Oklahoma State 37–16. Kansas has made two bowl games in four years with Lance Leipold in charge of the Jayhawks.

While Kansas has yet to have a Heisman Trophy winner, they have had one Heisman finalist and 2 other players receive votes. John Hadl, Bobby Douglass, and David Jaynes all received votes, Jaynes being the only finalist. Other notable former Kansas players include Pro Football Hall of Famers Gale Sayers, John Riggins, and Mike McCormack, as well as All-Americans Nolan Cromwell, Dana Stubblefield, Aqib Talib, and Anthony Collins. Former line coach Mike Getto is the only coach to have gone on to become a head coach in the NFL. Additionally, two members of the Naismith Memorial Basketball Hall of Fame have been associated with Kansas Football: Phog Allen, who coached football at Kansas for a season in 1920, and Ralph Miller, who was a quarterback on the team from 1937 to 1940. Jim Bausch, who won gold in the decathlon at the 1932 Summer Olympics, was a running back at Kansas and was inducted into the College Football Hall of Fame.

Kansas has appeared in fourteen bowl games, including three trips to the Orange Bowl (1948, 1969, and 2008). Kansas has also won six conference championships, most recently winning one in 1968. Kansas played in the first NCAA-contracted nationally televised regular season college football game on September 20, 1952, against TCU.

Along with Iowa, Missouri, Nebraska, and Washington University in St. Louis, Kansas was a charter member of the Missouri Valley Intercollegiate Athletic Association in 1907, which evolved into the Big Eight Conference. The Big Eight was folded into the Big 12 in 1996, and Kansas is the only original member of the MVIAA that is still part of the Big 12.

== History ==
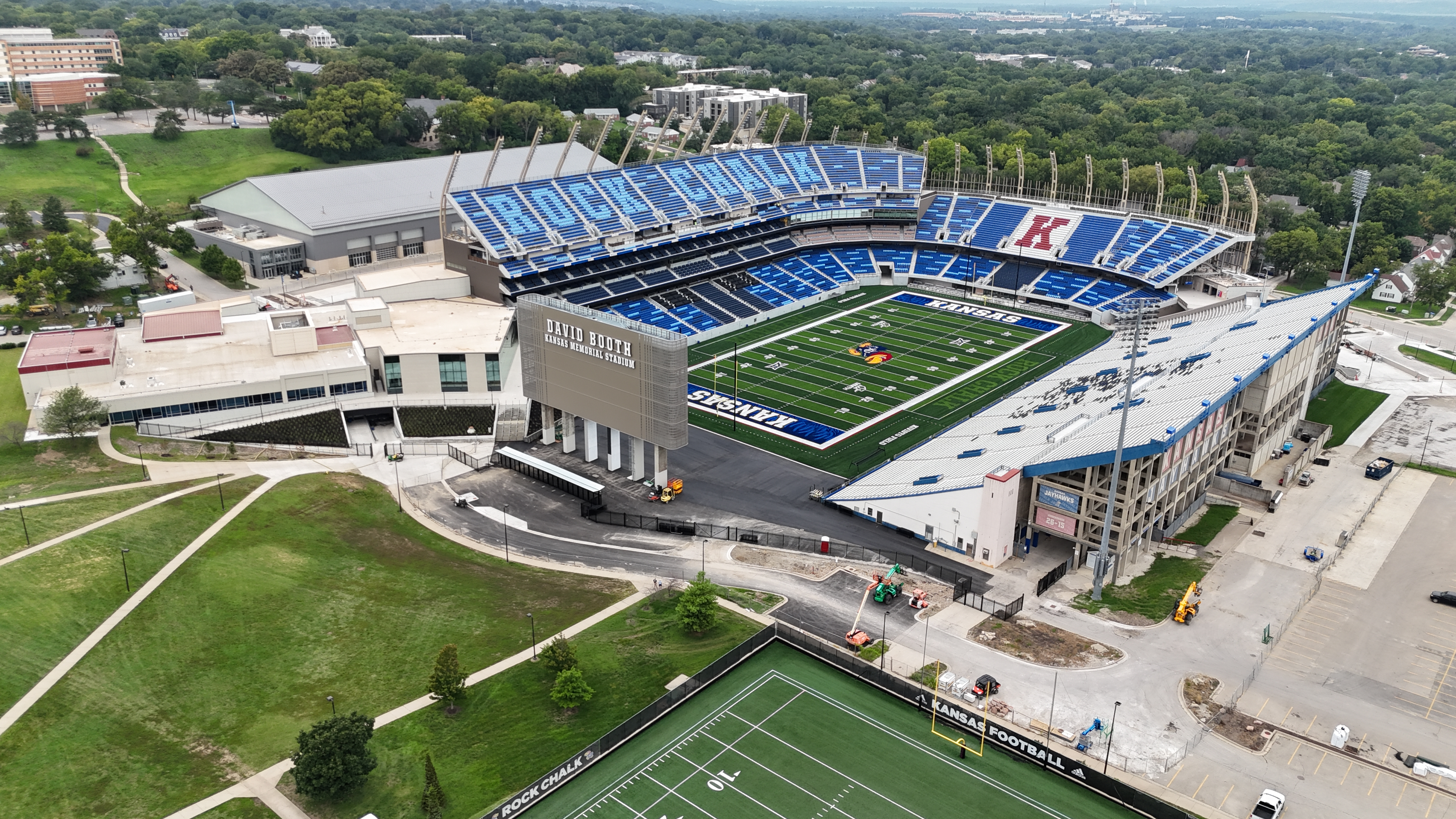
The Jayhawk's home stadium, David Booth Kansas Memorial Stadium in August 2025

The Jayhawks are one of the oldest football programs in the country, being founded in 1890. The most successful era for Kansas football was 1890 to 1952, when the program recorded four undefeated seasons and posted an overall .603 winning percentage, over 300 wins, several conference championships, and made major bowl appearances. From 1953 to 1968, the Jayhawks continued to find success on the football field, sharing three conference titles and attending more bowl games, but the team's overall winning percentage during that era slipped. From 1969 through the 2009 season KU's winning percentage dipped to .427 (195–263–9), but the team continued to find some success during this era, twice finishing in the top 10 of the AP Poll, including a 12–1 season in 2007 that ended with an Orange Bowl victory.

The losing accelerated during the years 2010 to 2021, during which the team posted a 23–118 record (.163 winning percentage), including two of the three winless seasons in the program's history. During the 2012 season, the program's all-time winning percentage fell below .500 for the first time since KU finished 1–2 in 1890. But 2021 also saw the hiring of current coach Lance Leipold, who has dramatically improved the team's records in his three seasons.

=== Early history (1890–1947) ===
Will Coleman was player-coach for the first Kansas Jayhawks football team in 1890.

The University of Kansas fielded its first football team in 1890, led by player-coach Will Coleman. Kansas traveled to nearby Baker University to play the first college football game in Kansas to start that season. After playing an abbreviated three-game season in 1890, KU played its first full schedule in 1891 and immediately found success, posting a 7–0–1 record under head coach E. M. Hopkins. The 1891 season also featured the school's first football game against the University of Missouri, the first game in what would become the long-running Border War rivalry, a 22–8 KU victory in Kansas City.

In 1899, Hall-of-Famer Fielding H. Yost served one season as KU's football coach, posting the first perfect season in school history (10–0). After the turn of the century, Hall-of-Famer John Outland, who played at KU in 1895–1896, returned to Kansas to serve as head coach, but struggled to a 3–5–2 record in his only season in 1901. The 1902 season featured the program's first game of its rivalry against Kansas State, a 16–0 Jayhawk win.

The program had ten head coaches in its first 14 seasons, but A. R. Kennedy took the position in 1904 and held it for the next seven highly successful seasons, through 1910. Kennedy's overall coaching record at Kansas was 52–9–4. This still ranks as the most wins for any Kansas head coach, and puts him fourth at the school in terms of winning percentage (.831). Kennedy's best season was 1908, when the Jayhawks posted the school's second ever undefeated season (9–0) and won the school's first major conference championship, in the Missouri Valley Intercollegiate Athletic Association. KU has not had another perfect season since 1908. Kennedy was also one of the best performing coaches for Kansas in the Border War (as of 2007 called "Border Showdown") between Kansas and Missouri, going 4–1–2 (.714) against MU as a coach and 7–1–2 (.800) against MU cumulatively as a coach and player.

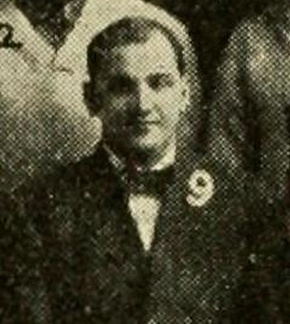
A. R. Kennedy is the winningest coach in KU history.

Kennedy's long tenure was followed by another period of rapid turnover in coaches, with seven head coaches for KU in the next ten seasons. The most successful of these was Herman Olcott, who had a three-year tenure as head coach from 1915 to 1917, posting a record of 16–7–1 (.688). Basketball coach Phog Allen also served one year as head football coach during this era, with a record of 5–2–1 in 1920. Potsy Clark finally returned some stability to the position, serving as KU's head football coach for five seasons, from 1921 to 1925. Although Clark would later go on to find success as an NFL head coach, at KU he amassed a 16–17–6 record in his five seasons and left the school as the first coach with an overall losing record since John Outland in 1901. Football innovator Bill Hargiss – one of the first in the sport to use the huddle and forward pass – was hired as KU head coach in 1928. Hargiss coached the team to a Big Six championship in 1930, but could not sustain success and was fired only two games into the 1932 season, after the Jayhawks lost at home to Oklahoma, 21–6. Hargiss recorded an overall mark of 18–16–2 (.528) as KU head coach. Through the end of Hargiss's tenure in 1932 the Jayhawks football program had registered a great deal of success, with only four of the first twenty coaches at KU suffering losing records. Beginning with Hargiss's successor Adrian Lindsey's 23–30–8 mark at KU, four of the next seven coaches at KU would post losing records.

KU alum Adrian Lindsey was hired by his alma mater as head football coach in the middle of the 1932 season, taking over after the mid-season firing of Bill Hargiss. Lindsey led the Jayhawks to a 4–2 record during his first partial season. Lindsey's teams thereafter struggled to find success on the football field, posting an overall record of 23–30–8 during Lindsey's time as head coach. Lindsey was replaced after the 1938 season. In 1939, Gwinn Henry, formerly head coach of the rival Missouri Tigers from 1923 to 1931, was hired to take over the struggling Jayhawks football program. In four seasons at KU, Henry failed to find much success on the field, going a dismal 9–27 – the worst record of any KU head coach to that time. Because of the struggles, Henry was fired after the 1942 season. Henry Shenk was hired to replace Gwinn Henry but failed to turn around the Jayhawks football program, which by this time had fallen to the bottom of the Big Six Conference. Shenk's teams fared better than his predecessors, but failed to post a winning record in any of his three seasons. Shenk's final record at KU was 11–16–3.

Though he was KU's head coach for only two years, George Sauer had an immediate impact on the program and was the most successful Jayhawks coach since A. R. Kennedy. Both of his KU teams won a share of the Big Six Conference, posting records of 7–2–1 and 8–1–2. His 1947 team was invited to KU's first bowl game, the Orange Bowl. Despite falling 20–14 to Georgia Tech in the bowl game, KU finished the 1947 season ranked No. 12 in the AP Poll – the program's first appearance in a final poll. Sauer departed after his successful 1947 season to accept the head football coach position at Navy. His final record at KU was 15–3–3, giving him the highest winning percentage of any KU coach since A. R. Kennedy. He was inducted into the College Football Hall of Fame as a player in 1954.

Jules Sikes came to Kansas from his post as defensive line coach at Georgia. Sikes had success at KU, in particular 7–3 seasons in 1948 and 1952, 6–4 in 1950 and 8–2 in 1951 that included a No. 20 ranking in the final Coaches' Poll. Despite several winning years, a 2–8 season in 1953 sealed his fate as head coach. He was fired after the dismal season. His final record with the Jayhawks was 35–25.

=== Mid-century ===
Chuck Mather was hired in 1954 as the 27th head football coach for the Kansas Jayhawks. He started his tenure with an 0–10 season in 1954, the first winless season in KU history. Mather continued to struggle at KU, leaving after the 1957 season with an overall coaching record at Kansas of 11–26–3, ranking him 18th at Kansas in terms of total wins and 34th in terms of winning percentage.

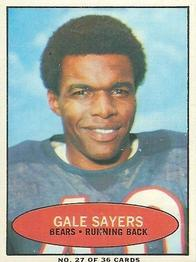
Gale Sayers (1962–64), Hall of Fame RB

Jack Mitchell left Arkansas and came to the Jayhawks to replace Mather in 1958. His overall coaching record at Kansas was 44–42–5 in nine seasons. This ranks him fourth at Kansas in terms of total wins and 20th at Kansas in terms of winning percentage. Mitchell's teams made one bowl appearance at KU, the 1961 Bluebonnet Bowl, a game KU won. That year, the Jayhawks finished the season with a 7–3–1 record and a No. 15 ranking in the final Coaches' poll. Mitchell's 1960 team also was successful. That year, the Jayhawks finished 7–2–1 and had a final ranking of No. 9 and No. 11 in the final Coaches' and AP polls, respectively. When Mitchell retired from coaching after the 1966 season he was viewed by many as the savior of the Jayhawk football program.

UCLA assistant coach Pepper Rodgers was chosen as the head football coach after Mitchell's retirement. Rodgers led the Jayhawks to the Big Eight Conference title in 1968, the Jayhawks' most recent conference championship. That year, the Jayhawks finished the season with a 9–2 record, an Orange Bowl appearance (a 15–14 loss to Penn State) and final rankings of No. 6 and No. 7 in the final Coaches' and AP polls, respectively. Rodgers finished his tenure as KU head football coach with a 20–22 overall record in four seasons. He resigned after the 1970 season to accept the head football coach position at the school from which he came to KU, UCLA.

=== 1970-1989 ===
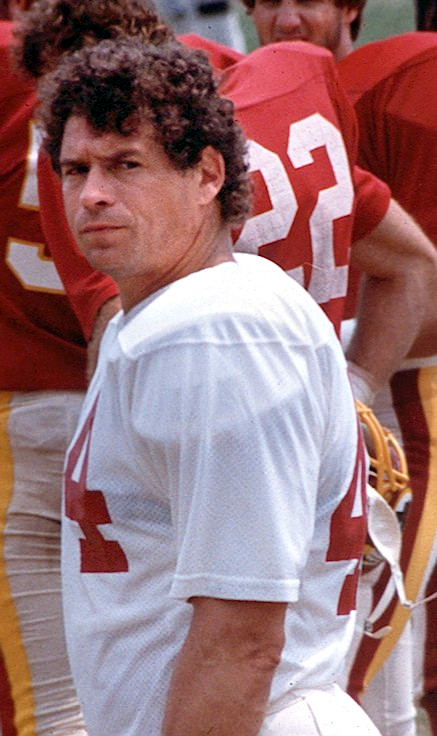
Hall of Fame RB John Riggins played for Kansas from 1967 to 1970. During his NFL career he was named MVP of Super Bowl XVII

A longtime Kansas assistant coach, Don Fambrough was elevated to head coach after the departure of Pepper Rodgers. During his first stint as head coach, Fambrough's only winning season was in 1973, when the Jayhawks finished the season 7–4–1 and made an appearance in the Liberty Bowl, a game they lost. That year, Kansas finished the season ranked No. 15 and No. 18 in the Coaches' and AP polls, respectively. However, when Kansas regressed to 4–7 in 1974 and the administration refused to renew his contract, Fambrough resigned.

Fambrough returned as head coach in 1979, and his second tenure as head coach is best known for the Jayhawks' 1981 season, that ended with an 8–4 record and an appearance in the All-American Bowl which, like many bowl games before it, resulted in a loss for the Jayhawks. Fambrough was fired after the 1982 season. His second tenure produced an 18–23–4 record, giving him an overall record of 37–48–5 in eight seasons at KU. In 1983, Kansas was found guilty of numerous recruiting violations, principally involving one of Fambrough's assistants. As a result, Kansas was banned from postseason play and live television in 1983. Fambrough was cleared of wrongdoing, but the assistant was slapped with a three-year show-cause penalty, which effectively blackballed him from the collegiate ranks until 1986.

Kansas hired Bud Moore, previously Alabama offensive coordinator under Bear Bryant, to replace Fambrough after his first exit from the Jayhawks. In his first season in 1975, Moore was named Big Eight Coach of the Year and was runner up to Woody Hayes as the Football Writers Association of America National Coach of the Year. Moore led his team to a 23–3 upset over eventual national champion Oklahoma, breaking the Sooners' 37-game winning streak. After thrashing Missouri the Jayhawks received a bid to the Sun Bowl, losing to Pitt (who would win the national championship in 1976), giving the Hawks a final record of 7–5.

In 1976, the Jayhawks started 4-0 and were ranked 8th in the AP poll (the last time they would be ranked in 17 years), but after QB Nolan Cromwell suffered a season-ending knee injury against Oklahoma, KU finished 6–5. Moore was the first KU coach with back-to-back winning seasons since Jack Mitchell in 1961–62, but this success was followed by 4–6–1 in 1977 and then 1–10 in 1978. In spite of dominating rivals Missouri and Kansas State, these struggles, failure to improve facilities, plus lagging attendance, led to Moore's firing as head coach after four seasons. In 1983, KU hired Mike Gottfried away from Cincinnati to replace the Fambrough. Gottfried had a mediocre tenure as the Jayhawks head coach, making modest improvement each season, with records of 4–6–1, 5–6 and 6–6. His final record at KU was 15–18–1.

Gottfried departed Kansas after three seasons to accept the head football coach position at Pittsburgh. He was succeeded by offensive coordinator Bob Valesente. During Valesente's two seasons as head coach, the Jayhawks compiled a record of 4–17–1 overall, and 0–13–1 against Big Eight opponents – finishing with a winning percentage of .205, the worst in school history to that time (since surpassed by Charlie Weis, David Beaty, and Clint Bowen). The Jayhawks went 1–9–1 in 1987 with their only win being a 16–15 game against Southern Illinois. Valesente was fired at the end of the season. At the time of his firing, Valesente was in the second year of a four-year contract, which athletic director Bob Frederick said would be honored. Valesente told reporters, "I don't believe two years is enough to build a program. I just don't feel we've been given enough time." Valesente had undertaken efforts to improve the team's academic standing and noted, "I feel proud of the fact that we have begun to overcome some of the immense academic problems that have plagued us. We needed to first stop the academic attrition." Anthony Redwood, the chairman of the Kansas Athletic Corporation board and a business professor, resigned from the board in protest of the firing. Redwood noted, "Apparently we lack the courage at this institution to plan a course of action and stick with it. Certainly to the outside world this decision must call into question our commitment to the academic dimension of intercollegiate athletics."

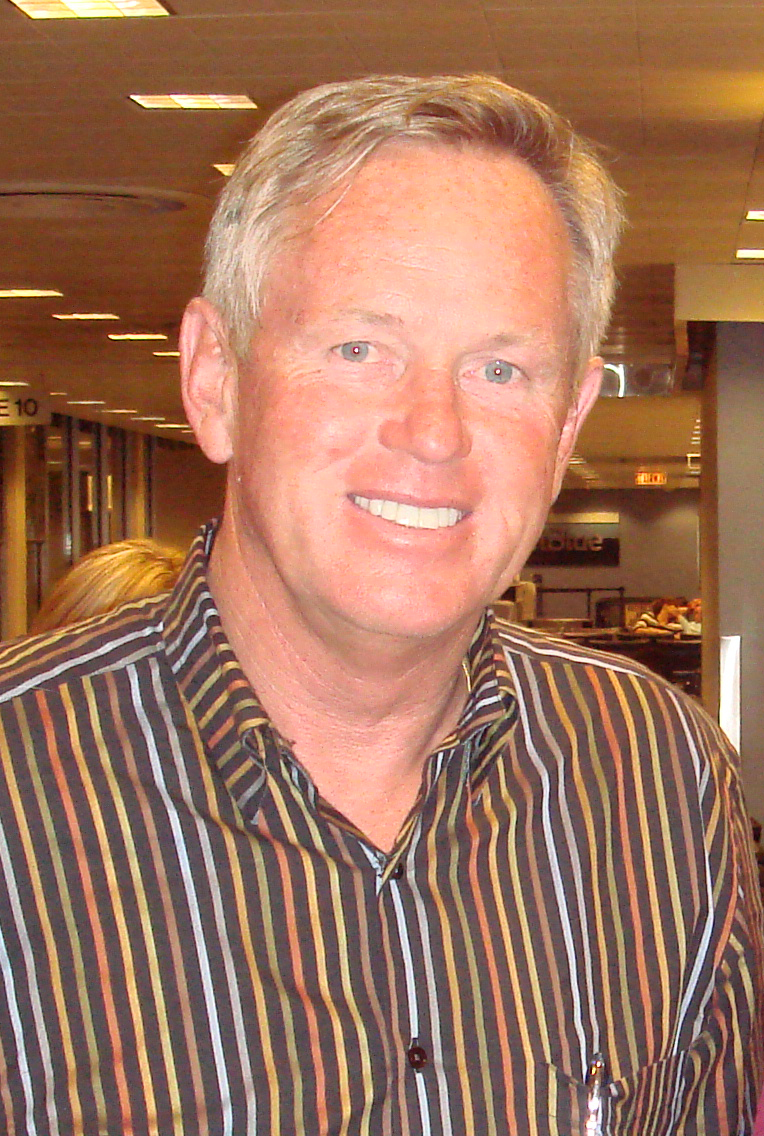
Glen Mason

=== Glen Mason era (1988–1995) ===
KU hired Glen Mason away from Kent State to take over the Jayhawks football program in late 1987. Mason restored promise into KU's football program, with four winning seasons in his nine seasons and two bowl victories, the 1992 and 1995 Aloha Bowl, defeating BYU and UCLA, respectively. These were the first KU bowl victories since the 1961 Bluebonnet Bowl. Those years, the Jayhawks finished 8–4 and 10–2, the latter of which tied a school record for victories in a single season, previously set in 1899.

In 1995, as Kansas prepared for the Aloha Bowl against UCLA, Mason accepted the head coaching position at Georgia. Mason had a change of heart and stayed with the Jayhawks, but left for the Minnesota one season later. His final record at Kansas was 47–54–1.

=== First Decline ===
Coach Terry Allen came to KU from Northern Iowa after the departure of Glen Mason. Despite increased optimism from the fans and administration due to the successes of the previous coaching staff, Allen's teams continued the KU football tradition of struggling on the playing field, failing to compile a winning season in five years and finishing 21–35 in that span of time.

Allen was fired with two games left in his fifth season at Kansas. His best season was a 5–6 record his first year.

=== Mark Mangino era (2002–2009) ===
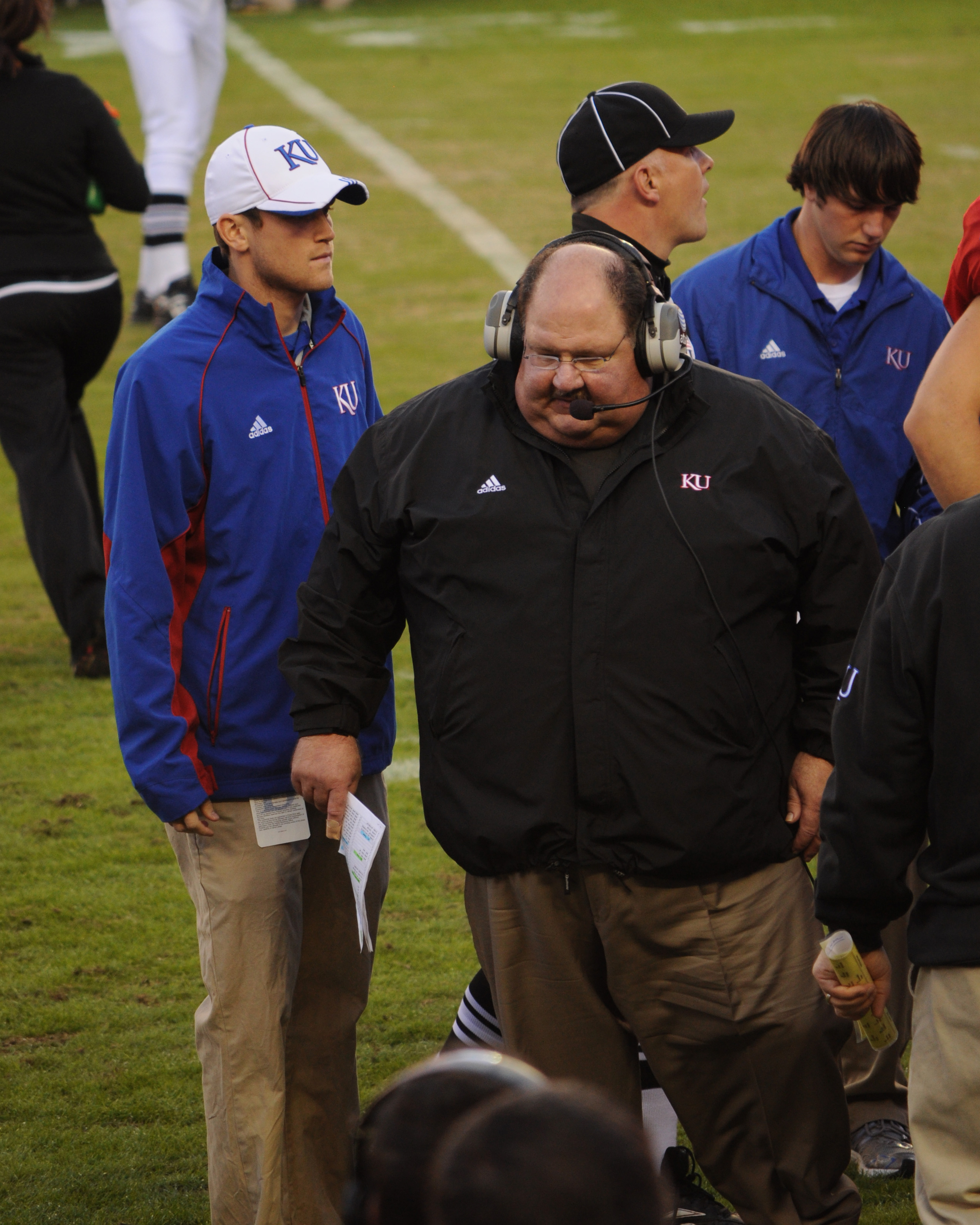
Mark Mangino

The Jayhawks hired Mark Mangino, previously offensive coordinator at Oklahoma, as the new KU head coach in late 2001. The program had not posted a winning season in any of the 6 seasons prior to his arrival. While an intense, foul-mouthed and fiery coach, Mangino was able to enjoy success at that previous KU coaches hadn't. In 2003, his second season at KU, Mangino led the Jayhawks to an appearance in the 2003 Tangerine Bowl (now known as the Russell Athletic Bowl). This was the first bowl appearance for Kansas since 1995. In 2005, his fourth season at KU, the team finished the regular season 6–5, to post its first winning record under Mangino, and went on to the Fort Worth Bowl, its second bowl game in three seasons. Among the Jayhawks' wins was a 40–15 victory over Nebraska, breaking a losing streak that had begun in 1969, which was the second-longest streak of consecutive losses to one team in NCAA history. The same year Mangino also built a defense that ranked 11th nationally in yards allowed per game and featured third-team All-American and Big 12 Conference Defensive Player of the Year linebacker Nick Reid as well as a pair of talented cornerbacks in Charles Gordon and Aqib Talib. In 2007, Mangino coached the Jayhawks to a 12–1 record and the 2008 Orange Bowl. The Jayhawks defeated Virginia Tech 24–21 in that game, which gave the Jayhawks their first and only BCS Bowl Game appearance and victory. Mangino's Jayhawk defense was ranked 12th in the nation, and 4th in scoring defense. On the other side of the ball, the Jayhawks finished 2nd in scoring offense led by Quarterback Todd Reesing

Following a win against rival Iowa State, Mark Mangino became the first KU football coach with a winning career record since Jack Mitchell in 1966. While at Kansas, Mangino led the Jayhawks to 19 consecutive weeks ranked in the AP and/or USA Today polls (2007–08), 20 wins in a 2-year period for the first time in school history, set home attendance average records in each of the last 4 seasons (2004–2008), led KU to its first appearance in national polls since 1996 and to the school's highest ranking ever at No. 2, and produced the top 3 total offense seasons in school history, the top two passing seasons and two of the top three scoring seasons and won three Bowl games—the same number they had won in their 102-year history combined prior to his arrival. Mangino also led the Jayhawks to victories in the 2005 Fort Worth Bowl and the 2008 Insight Bowl.

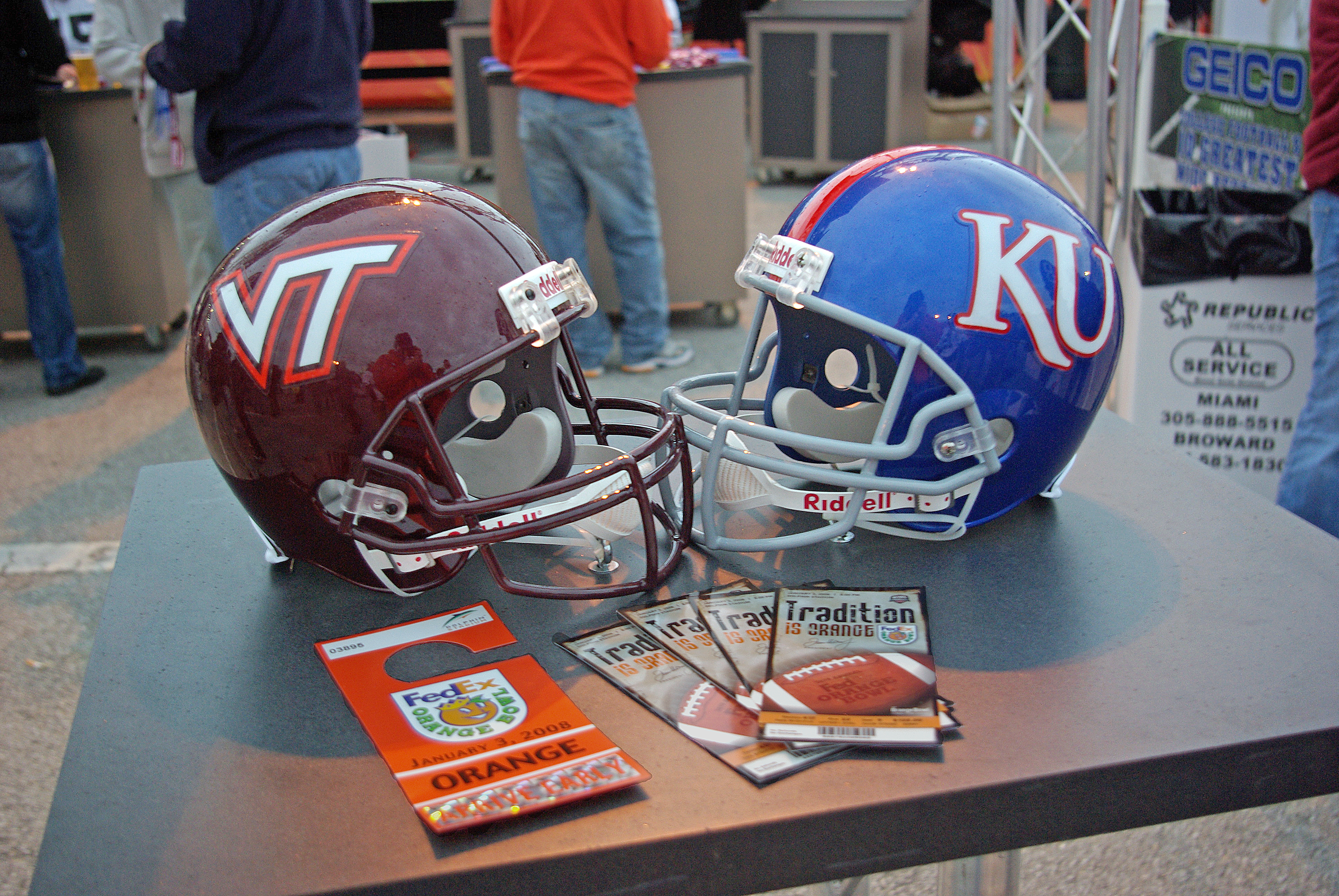
Mangino led KU to a victory in the prestigious BCS affiliated 2008 Orange Bowl over Virginia Tech

With 50 victories, Mangino has the second-most victories in Kansas coaching history. Mangino was named AFCA Coach of the Year, AP Coach of the Year, Eddie Robinson Coach of the Year, George Munger Award winner, Home Depot Coach of the Year, Paul "Bear" Bryant Coach of the Year, Sporting News College Football Coach of the Year, Walter Camp Coach of the Year, Woody Hayes Coach of the Year and Big 12 Coach of the Year in 2007.

In 2009, the Jayhawks started the season with a 5–0 record (No. 16 in AP poll at the time), but lost their final 7 games to finish at 5–7. In November 2009, the recurring issue of Mangino's alleged misconduct towards his players became the subject of an internal investigation by the University of Kansas Athletic Department. National sports media coverage of this increased already-mounting public pressure on the university to terminate Mangino's employment. After a prolonged period of negotiations, the university and Mangino's attorneys agreed on the buy-out amount that was large enough to secure his quiet resignation as head football coach in December 2009.

Mangino's final record at KU was 50–48. He was the first head football coach to leave the Jayhawks with an overall winning record since Jack Mitchell in 1966.

=== Second Decline ===
On December 13, 2009, Turner Gill was hired away from Buffalo and announced as the new head coach of the Kansas football team. He was the first African American head football coach in KU history. Gill inherited a team that had lost its final 7 games under Mangino.

On September 4, 2010, Gill lost his Kansas home debut to an FCS school (North Dakota State) 6–3. The Jayhawks bounced back the following week to upset No. 15 Georgia Tech 28–25. The upset was a high point in an otherwise difficult 3–9 season. The Jayhawks had one conference win in 2010, a 52–45 comeback win over Colorado after trailing 45–17 in the 4th quarter, with Colorado coach Dan Hawkins calling mostly passing plays to pad stats. It was the final meeting between the teams before Colorado exited the Big 12 for the Pac-12 Conference.

The 2011 Jayhawks started the season at 2–0, but finished on a 10-game losing streak. This included lopsided losses to Georgia Tech (66–24), Oklahoma State (70–28), Oklahoma (47–17), Kansas State (59–21), Texas (43–0), and Texas A&M (61–7). Of 120 teams, the Jayhawks ranked 101st in passing yards, 95th in points scored, 120th in points allowed, 106th in total offense, and were outscored 525–238.

Then-KU athletics director Sheahon Zenger fired Gill after just two seasons with a 5–19 overall record., a 1–16 record against the Big 12, and a 4–18 record against FBS opponents. The university owed Gill nearly $6 million, money that was due in just 120 days. To pay this, the university relied upon donations from Jayhawks boosters.

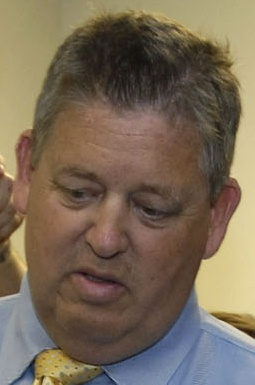
Charlie Weis

Zenger then hired former Notre Dame head coach Charlie Weis, who at the time was serving as offensive coordinator at Florida, as the new Jayhawks head football coach in December 2011. A big-name coach, Weis was popular among KU fans and was expected to lure recruits to KU and rebuild the football program.

Weis' 2012 Jayhawks team struggled to a 1–11 record in what was dubbed as a rebuilding year. During that season, the Jayhawks' all-time record dipped below .500 for the first time since the Jayhawks finished 1–2 in their inaugural season. In 2013, the 3–9 Jayhawks ended a 27-game Big 12 Conference losing streak, which had spanned three years, with a 31–19 home victory over West Virginia in November 2013. Weis was fired on September 28, 2014, for "lack of on-field progress" four games into the 2014 season. Weis' teams had an overall record of 6–22, a 1–17 record vs. the Big 12, and a 3–22 record against FBS opponents. Defensive coordinator Clint Bowen was named interim head coach. Bowen posted a 1–7 record as interim coach, the lone victory a conference win over Iowa State.

On December 5, 2014, KU announced the hiring of Texas A&M wide receivers coach David Beaty as the Jayhawks head coach. Former interim head coach Clint Bowen remained at KU on the coaching staff as a co-defensive coordinator and assistant head coach. Beaty concluded his first season (2015) with an 0–12 record, the first winless season for KU football since 1954. Out of 128 teams, Kansas ranked 124th in scoring, 128th in points allowed, 115th in total offense, and 128th in total defense, and was outscored 554–183.

In the 2016 season opener, Kansas beat FCS school Rhode Island 55–6, securing their first win since November 2014. On November 19, 2016, Kansas beat the Texas Longhorns in Lawrence 24–21 in overtime – the Jayhawks’ first win over Texas in more than 75 years.

The 2018 season began with a home loss to an FCS opponent in Nicholls State. However, the Jayhawks bounced back to rout Central Michigan 31–7 in week 2, and Rutgers 55–14 in week 3. Central Michigan was KU's first road win since September 12, 2009 (Mangino's final season), and snapped a 46-game road losing streak. Kansas got their first Big 12 win of the season against TCU, winning by a score of 27–26.

On November 4, after a home loss to Iowa State, it was announced that Beaty would coach the final three games but would be fired at the end of the season. Beaty's record was 6–42 over four seasons, with a 2–34 record against the Big 12, and a 4–40 record against FBS opponents.

On November 18, 2018, former Oklahoma State and LSU head coach Les Miles was hired as the new head coach. Miles arrived in Lawrence with credentials including a turnaround in five seasons at Oklahoma State, seven ten-win seasons in 11 years as LSU head coach, including winning the 2007 national championship, and an appearance in the 2012 BCS National Championship Game and many players drafted into the National Football League. Miles signed a five-year contract worth $13.8 million in base salary. His first season ended with a 3–9 record and 1–8 conference record; however, they ended a 48-game losing streak in road games against power five conference opponents with a 48–24 win at Boston College. His second season, which was shortened due to the COVID-19 pandemic, ended with a 0–9 record. Miles was put on administrative leave on March 5, 2021, for allegations of misconduct with female students from his time at LSU. Miles and Kansas would mutually agree to part ways on March 8. Wide receivers coach Emmett Jones was named interim coach three days later.

=== 2021–present ===
Lance Leipold was hired to replace Miles on April 30, 2021. The circumstances of the hiring being at the end of Spring caused Leipold to only have one full month of practice with the team before Kansas's first game in September against South Dakota. The Jayhawks would win their first game under Leipold by defeating South Dakota 17–14 on September 4. The win would also be Kansas's first since 2019. On November 13, the Jayhawks ended a 56-game road losing streak in Big 12 play when they earned a 57–56 overtime victory over the Texas Longhorns. Kansas fell to TCU and West Virginia the final two weeks of the season, but each by less than a touchdown. Earlier in the season, the Jayhawks also nearly beat Oklahoma who was 2nd in the AP rankings. They held Oklahoma to zero points in the 1st half, but ultimately lost after a controversial second half handoff play that would seal the win for the Sooners.

==== Resurgence ====
At the beginning of Leipold's second season at Kansas, the Jayhawks beat Tennessee Tech 56–10. In week 2 the Jayhawks beat West Virginia 55–42 in Morgantown, winning their first conference opener since 2009, and their first conference road opener since 2008, and becoming the first NCAA team since 1996 to win an overtime game by two touchdowns. After their 3–0 start to the 2022 season, Kansas received votes to be ranked for the first time since 2009. The Jayhawks would enter the polls the following week at 19 after starting 5–0, but would fall out of the rankings after back-to-back losses. The Jayhawks would finish the regular season 6-6 and were selected to play Arkansas in the 2022 Liberty Bowl, KU's first bowl appearance since 2009. Arkansas would go on to beat KU in 3 overtimes, 55–53.

In 2023, Kansas began the season 4–0, its second consecutive season starting 4–0. It was the first time the Jayhawks started 4–0 back to seasons starting they had the start 3 consecutive seasons from 1913 to 1915. Four weeks later, the Jayhawks defeated Oklahoma.

The win over Oklahoma accomplished several feats: It was the first home win for Kansas over a top 10 ranked team since 1984, the first win over Oklahoma since 1997, and first win over a top 10 opponent since the 2008 Orange Bowl. The victory also made Kansas bowl eligible for the 2nd consecutive season for only the third time in program history. On December 26, 2023, Kansas defeated the UNLV Rebels, 49–36, for the team's first bowl victory since 2008.

Quarterback Jason Bean threw for six touchdowns and 449 yards, three touchdowns each to receivers Luke Grimm and Lawrence Arnold. Bean set records for the most passing touchdowns in Kansas bowl history, which was set the previous year by quarterback Jalon Daniels, and the record for most passing touchdowns by a Big 12 player in bowl game. Bean also moved up to second place on the Kansas all-time passing touchdowns list with his 38th, surpassing Carter Stanley.

== Notable games ==
- November 22, 1890: Kansas played their first game in program history against Baker. The game was also the first college football game played in Kansas. Kansas lost 22–9.
- December 8, 1890: Kansas won their first game in program history, defeating Baker 14–12.
- October 31, 1891: Kansas played Missouri for the first time beginning the Border War rivalry between programs which eventually became one of the longest continuously played rivalries in the nation before Missouri left for the SEC. Kansas won 22–8.
- December 22, 1891: Kansas tied Washington University 6–6 clinching their first undefeated season in program history, finishing the season 7–0–1.
- November 26, 1892: After defeating rival Missouri 12–4, Kansas clinched their first Conference Championship in program history finishing 3–0 in the WIFUA.
- November 30, 1899: Kansas defeated rival Missouri 34–6 to finish the season 10–0, their first undefeated and untied season in program history.
- October 7, 1902: Kansas played their first game in the Sunflower Showdown against Kansas State. The rivalry would eventually become one of the top 10 rivalries in the country in terms of games played. Kansas won 16–0.
- November 26, 1908: Kansas finishes the season undefeated after beating rival Missouri 10–4 in front of 13,000 fans, clinching the Missouri Valley Conference Title for the first time.
- October 29, 1921: Kansas played rival Kansas State in Memorial Stadium, later renamed David Booth Kansas Memorial Stadium, in their first game in the stadium since it opened. The stadium was named in honor of students of the school who died in World War I. It remains one of the oldest stadiums in the nation. Kansas won the game 21–7.
- October 11, 1947: The Jayhawks defeated South Dakota 86–6. The 86 points set a program record for points in a game, which (as of the 2023 season) still stands.
- January 1, 1948: Kansas played in Georgia Tech in the 1948 Orange Bowl, their first bowl game in program history. They lost the game 20–14.
- December 17, 1961: Kansas defeated Rice 33–7 in the 1961 Bluebonnet Bowl to earn their first Bowl Game victory in program history.
- November 8, 1975: Kansas defeated eventual national champion Oklahoma 23-3, breaking the Sooners' 37-game unbeaten streak.
- September 8, 1984: Kansas defeated Wichita State 31–7 in their final game against Wichita State before the school eliminated their football program in 1987.
- October 9, 2004: Kansas defeated rival Kansas State 31–28 ending an 11-game losing streak to the team.
- November 5, 2005: Kansas defeated Nebraska 40–15 ending a 36-game losing streak to the team.
- November 3, 2007: An 8th ranked Kansas defeated Nebraska 76–39, their second victory over Nebraska in 3 years and the most points they had scored in a game since 1947. It is also the most points ever allowed by Nebraska in a game and the most points scored by either team in their 117 games against each other.
- November 17, 2007: The 4th ranked Jayhawks defeated Iowa State 45–7 to begin their season 11–0, their first time ever having a record of 11–0. In the poll following the game, Kansas was ranked No. 2 in every major poll, their highest ranking in program history. They also received No. 1 votes in the AP and coaches polls.
- November 24, 2007: Kansas and Missouri played in Arrowhead Stadium. The Jayhawks were ranked 2nd and Missouri was ranked 3rd, the first time both teams were ranked in the top 5. Following number 1 LSU's loss the previous night, the winner would presumably be ranked number 1 which would have been a first for either program. The Jayhawks would lose the game 36–28.
- January 3, 2008: Kansas defeated Virginia Tech 24–21 in the 2008 Orange Bowl. The game was the Jayhawks first, and eventually only appearance, in a BCS Bowl game before the BCS was discontinued. It was the only BCS Bowl game victory for Kansas in the BCS's existence.
- December 31, 2008: Kansas defeated Minnesota 42–21 in the 2008 Insight Bowl. It was the first time (and to date only time) Kansas won a bowl game in back-to-back seasons.
- November 26, 2011: Kansas played rival Missouri in the last game of the rivalry as conference opponents. Missouri won 10–24. The teams aren't scheduled to play another regular season game until 2025.
- November 19, 2016: Kansas defeated Texas 24–21 in overtime to beat Texas for the first time since they became conference opponents and the first time overall since 1938.
- September 8, 2018: Kansas defeated Central Michigan on the road to earn their first road victory since 2009, ending a 46-game losing streak.
- November 13, 2021: Kansas defeats Texas in Austin for the first time in program history after an overtime two-point conversion pass from Jalon Daniels to Jared Casey, to make the final score 57–56. The game also ended a 56-game conference losing streak on the road.
- October 1, 2022: Kansas defeats Iowa State 14–11, starting 5-0 for the first time since 2009, and earning the Jayhawks top 20 rankings in both the AP and Coaches poll.
- October 8, 2022: Kansas hosts College Gameday for the first time in program history, as they play No. 17 TCU. The game also marked the first time since 2009 that the Jayhawks had back-to-back home sellouts at Memorial Stadium. Kansas would fall to the Horned Frogs 38–31 after starting quarterback Jalon Daniels fell with an injury in the first half. It was also the most attended College Gameday broadcast of the 2022 season.
- November 5, 2022: Kansas defeats No. 18 Oklahoma State 37–16, to become bowl eligible for the first time since 2008.
- December 28, 2022: Kansas plays in their first bowl game since 2008 against SEC opponent Arkansas in the Liberty Bowl. Kansas would fall in triple overtime after failing a 2-point conversion, ending the game 53–55.
- October 28, 2023: Kansas defeats No. 6 Oklahoma 38–33, beating the Sooners for the first time since 1997, and improving their record to 6–2, their best start to a season since 2008.
- December 26, 2023: Kansas defeats UNLV in the Guaranteed Rate Bowl 49–36. This marked the Jayhawks's first bowl victory since 2008. Quarterback Jason Bean threw 6 touchdown passes and had over 500 all purpose yards in the game, winning the MVP Award for the game.
- November 16, 2024: Kansas defeats No. 6 BYU in Provo, their first top 10 road victory in program history, and winning back-to-back ranked games for the first time in program history after beating No. 16 Iowa State the week prior.
- November 23, 2024: Kansas defeats No. 16 Colorado to become the first team in NCAA history win Back-to-back-to-back ranked games in a row while being the underdog going into the game.

== Conference affiliations ==
Kansas has been affiliated with the following conferences:

Conference	Years	Reason left
Kansas Intercollegiate Athletic Association	1890–1891	Joined WIUFA
Western Interstate University Football Association	1892–1897	Conference dissolved
Independent	1898–1906	Joined MVIAA
Missouri Valley Intercollegiate Athletic Association*	1907–1928	Conference dissolved
Big Six/Seven/Eight Conference	1929–1995	Conference dissolved
Big 12 Conference	1996–present	N/A

*While there is an active FCS conference with the name Missouri Valley, it is officially and legally a separate entity from the MVIAA. Both previously mentioned Missouri Valley Conferences are also separate entities from the Missouri Valley Conference.

== Championships ==
=== Conference championships ===
Kansas has won six conference championships.

Year	Conference	Coach	Overall record	Conference record
1908	MVIAA	A. R. Kennedy	9–0	4–0
1923	MVIAA	Potsy Clark	5–0–3	3–0–3
1930	Big Eight Conference	Homer Woodson Hargiss	6–2	4–1
1946†	Big Eight Conference	George Sauer	7–2–1	4–1
1947†	Big Eight Conference	George Sauer	8–1–2	4–0–1
1968†	Big Eight Conference	Pepper Rodgers	9–2	6–1

† Co-championship

=== Division championships ===
The Big 12 had a North and South division from its inaugural season through the 2010 season when Nebraska and Colorado left the conference. In that time frame, the Jayhawks won 1 division title.

Year	Conference	Coach	Conference record
2007†	Big 12 North	Mark Mangino	7–1

† Co-championship

== Bowl games ==
The Jayhawks have participated in 14 bowl games, compiling a 7–7 record through the 2023 season. During the BCS’ 16 seasons of existence, the Jayhawks appeared in one BCS Bowl game, the 2008 Orange Bowl, which they won. The Jayhawks longest amount of time in between bowl games is 12 years, which they've done twice, from 1948 to 1960 and 2009 to 2021.

Year	Coach	Bowl	Opponent	Result
1947	George Sauer	Orange Bowl	Georgia Tech	L 14–20
1961	Jack Mitchell	Bluebonnet Bowl	Rice	W 33–7
1968	Pepper Rodgers	Orange Bowl	Penn State	L 14–15
1973	Don Fambrough	Liberty Bowl	NC State	L 18–31
1975	Bud Moore	Sun Bowl	Pittsburgh	L 19–33
1981	Don Fambrough	Hall of Fame Classic	Mississippi State	L 0–10
1992	Glen Mason	Aloha Bowl	BYU	W 23–20
1995	Glen Mason	Aloha Bowl	UCLA	W 51–31
2003	Mark Mangino	Tangerine Bowl	NC State	L 26–56
2005	Mark Mangino	Fort Worth Bowl	Houston	W 42–13
2007	Mark Mangino	Orange Bowl	Virginia Tech	W 24–21
2008	Mark Mangino	Insight Bowl	Minnesota	W 42–21
2022	Lance Leipold	Liberty Bowl	Arkansas	L 53–55^{3OT}
2023	Lance Leipold	Guaranteed Rate Bowl	UNLV	W 49–36

== Rivalries ==
=== Missouri ===
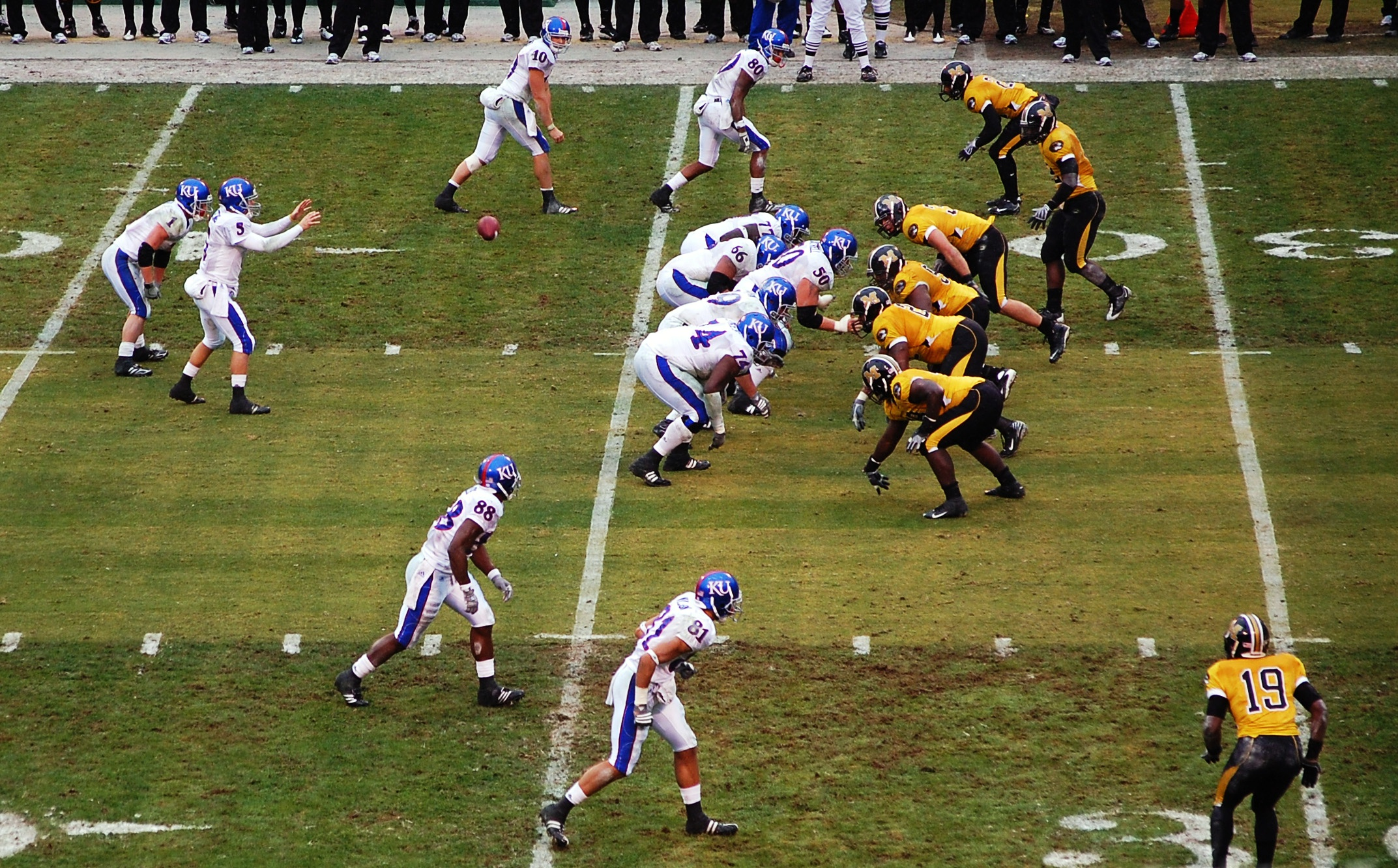
Kansas on offense against Missouri on November 29, 2008. KU defeated Mizzou 40–37.

The University of Kansas has a rivalry with the Missouri Tigers. The rivalry has been dormant since Missouri moved to the Southeastern Conference in 2012. Missouri leads the series 59–54–9

Before being inactive from 2012 to 2019, it was known as the oldest rivalry west of the Mississippi River. First played in 1891, the Jayhawks and Tigers met on the gridiron every year after through 2011, with the lone exception being 1918 (flu epidemic). The annual game was known as the "Border War," which derived its name from actual warfare that occurred during the Civil War between free-state "Jayhawkers" and pro-slavery "Bushwhackers" from Missouri. Six towns, including Osceola, Missouri, were pillaged and raided by the Jayhawkers. In retaliation, William Quantrill and his band of Bushwhackers burned Lawrence to the ground in what became known as the Lawrence Massacre. Ironically, Columbia, Missouri, the location of the University of Missouri was also nearly raided by Quantrill's band. The name of the rivalry was officially rebranded as the "Border Showdown" in 2004 out of deference to those serving in the Iraq War, but the historical name continued to prevail in usage. Each year the winner of the game was awarded a traveling trophy, the Indian War Drum. Kansas lost the 122nd and most recent Border War game to Missouri in 2026, 21-38.

In 1911, more than 1,000 people gathered in downtown Lawrence, Kansas to watch a mechanical reproduction of the game while it was being played. A Western Union telegraph wire was set up direct from Columbia, Missouri. A group of people then would announce the results of the previous play and used a large model of a football playing field to show the results. Those in attendance cheered as though they were watching the game live, including the school's Rock Chalk, Jayhawk cheer.

=== Kansas State ===
Kansas has a rivalry with the Kansas State Wildcats called the Sunflower Showdown. When the two teams compete in football, the winner is awarded the Governor's Cup by the governor of Kansas. Despite Kansas State holding a 27–8 record since 1988 in the series, Kansas leads the series 64–55–5. As of 2025, Kansas is on an 18-game losing streak to Kansas State. In the last 30 years KU has only beaten the Wildcats four times.

The two teams first met in 1902 and have played every year since 1911. It is the fifth-longest continuous series in NCAA college football history – 112 consecutive seasons after the 2022 game.

=== Nebraska ===
The Kansas-Nebraska series was the longest uninterrupted rivalry in college football until Nebraska's departure for the Big Ten Conference in 2011. Kansas and Nebraska met for the first time in 1892, and faced off annually from 1906 until 2010. Along with the Missouri rivalry, this gave Kansas the second- and third-most played Division I FBS college football series (Minnesota and Wisconsin have played one more game than KU-MU and two more than KU-NU). KU is only 23–90–3 all-time against the Cornhuskers (as of the last game in 2010), and from 1969 to 2004 the Huskers rang up 36 consecutive victories, second-longest in NCAA Division I (only Notre Dame's 43-game streak over Navy was longer). That streak ended on November 5, 2005, when Kansas defeated Nebraska 40–15 in Lawrence. They again beat Nebraska 76–39 in Lawrence on November 3, 2007. This was the largest number of points ever surrendered by a Nebraska team; the Jayhawks also set records for most points against Nebraska in a half (1st half, 48 points) and quarter (2nd quarter, 27 points). The 95 points scored by the Jayhawks in 2006 and 2007 combined is the largest consecutive two-year total in the series. Also, the 32 points scored in an overtime loss at Nebraska on September 30, 2006, was the most by any Jayhawk team in Lincoln since 1899, when KU won 36–20 in the two teams' eighth all-time meeting.

== Team records and statistics ==
=== In the polls ===
The Jayhawks have finished ranked in the AP poll eight times, and appeared in the poll at some point in 19 different seasons. They have only been ranked in a preseason poll 6 times. In the 2007 season the Jayhawks achieved a No. 2 ranking in the AP poll and the BCS rankings, which is the highest the team has ever been ranked. The highest postseason ranking the Jayhawks have ever received was 7th for the 2007 season. In the final poll of the 2007 season, the Jayhawks received one 1st place vote. The Jayhawks were ranked in the poll released on October 2, 2022. It was the first time they had been ranked since October 18, 2009. The most consecutive weeks the Jayhawks have been ranked in the AP poll is 16 consecutive polls dating from October 7, 2007, through October 19, 2008. The most consecutive games the Jayhawks have been unranked is 175 spanning from October 23, 1976, to September 22, 1992. In 2023, Kansas became ranked in the College Football Playoff poll for the first time since its inception in 2014.

==== AP Poll ====
Season	Preseason	Highest Rank	Final Ranking	Games played while ranked
1947	–	12	12	3
1950	–	19	–	1
1951	–	20	–	1
1952	17	7	–	10
1960	–	5	11	6
1961	8	8	–	2
1968	–	3	7	10
1973	–	17	18	7
1974	–	13	–	2
1975	–	17	–	2
1976	19	8	–	6
1992	–	13	22	7
1995	–	6	9	8
1996	24	20	–	3
2007	–	2	7	8
2008	14	13	–	8
2009	25	16	–	7
2022	–	19	–	2
2023	–	16	23	4
2024	22	19	–	2

==== BCS rankings (1998–2013) ====
Season	Highest BCS Rank	Final Ranking	Games played while ranked
2007	2	8	7
2008	23	–	1
2009	25	–	1

==== College Football Playoff poll ====
Season	Highest Rank	Games played while ranked
2023	16	3

== Players of note ==
=== Innovators to the game ===
- Don 'Red Dog' Ettinger – Inventor of the blitz

=== First-Team AP All-Americans ===
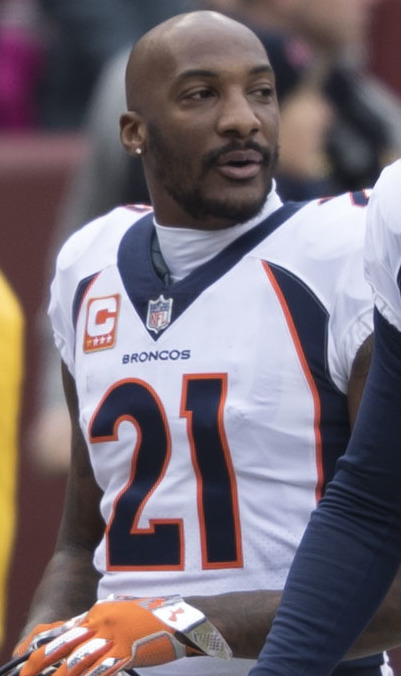
Cornerback Aqib Talib was All-American in 2007

- 1947– Ray Evans, RB
- 1947– Otto Schnellbacher, WR
- 1951– George Mrkonic, G
- 1952– Ollie Spencer, T
- 1960– John Hadl, RB
- 1961– John Hadl, QB
- 1963– Gale Sayers, RB
- 1964– Gale Sayers, RB
- 1968– Bobby Douglass, QB
- 1968– John Zook, DE
- 1973– David Jaynes, QB
- 2007– Anthony Collins, T
- 2007– Aqib Talib, CB

=== Heisman voting ===
The Jayhawks have never had a Heisman Trophy winner. Three players, however, have received votes. Quarterback David Jaynes is the only Heisman finalist in program history, losing to Penn State running back John Cappelletti.

Year	Player	Position	Place	1st place votes	Points
1961	John Hadl	QB	7th	33	172
1968	Bobby Douglass	QB	7th	9	132
1973	David Jaynes*	QB	4th	65	394

*Indicates a finalist

=== Ring of Honor members ===
The Ring of Honor is located atop the northern bowl at Memorial Stadium and is intended to honor Kansas All-Americans and others who have made a significant on-field contribution to the football program. They are listed in the order in which they were inducted.

Player	Career	Position
Ray Evans	1941–42, 1946–47	DB / RB
Otto Schnellbacher	1942, 1946–47	End
Mike McCormack	1948–50	OT
George Mrkonic	1950–52	G
Ollie Spencer	1950–52	T
Gil Reich	1952	DB
John Hadl	1959–61	QB / RB
Curtis McClinton	1959–61	RB
Gale Sayers	1962–64	RB
Bobby Douglass	1966–68	QB
John Zook	1966–68	DE
John Riggins	1968–70	RB
David Jaynes	1971–73	QB
Nolan Cromwell	1973–76	QB / S
Bruce Kallmeyer	1980–83	K
Willie Pless	1982–85	LB
Aqib Talib	2005–07	CB
Anthony Collins	2004–07	T
Gilbert Brown	1989–92	DT
Chris Harris	2007–10	CB
Todd Reesing	2006–09	QB
Larry Brown	1967–70	T
Darrell Stuckey	2006–09	S
Nick Reid	2002–05	LB
Tony Sands	1988–91	RB

=== Coaches in University of Kansas Athletics Hall of Fame ===
Former coaches for Kansas football are honored by being inducted into the Kansas Athletics Hall of Fame instead of the Ring of Honor. The following coaches are in the Kansas Hall of Fame.

Coach	Tenure
Phog Allen*	1920
Don Fambrough	1971–1974; 1979–1982
Mark Mangino	2002–2009
Glen Mason	1988–1996
Bud Moore	1975–1978
John Outland	1901
Pepper Rodgers	1967–1970
George Sauer	1946–1947

*Inducted as men's basketball coach

=== Retired numbers ===
Kansas Jayhawks retired numbers
No.	Player	Pos.	Tenure	Ref.
21	John Hadl	HB/QB	1959–1961	
42	Ray Evans	HB	1941–1942, 1946–1947	
48	Gale Sayers	RB	1962–1964	

=== College Football Hall of Fame inductees ===
Year	Player	Position
1951	Fielding H. Yost	Coach
1954	Jim Bausch	HB
1964	Ray Evans	HB
1977	Gale Sayers	HB
1994	John Hadl	QB
2001	John H. Outland	T/HB

=== Pro Football Hall of Fame inductees ===
Year	Player	Position
1977	Gale Sayers	HB
1984	Mike McCormack	OT
1992	John Riggins	RB

=== Canadian Football League Hall of Fame inductees ===
Year	Player	Position
2005	Willie Pless	LB
2019	Jon Cornish	RB

=== Former players notable in other fields ===
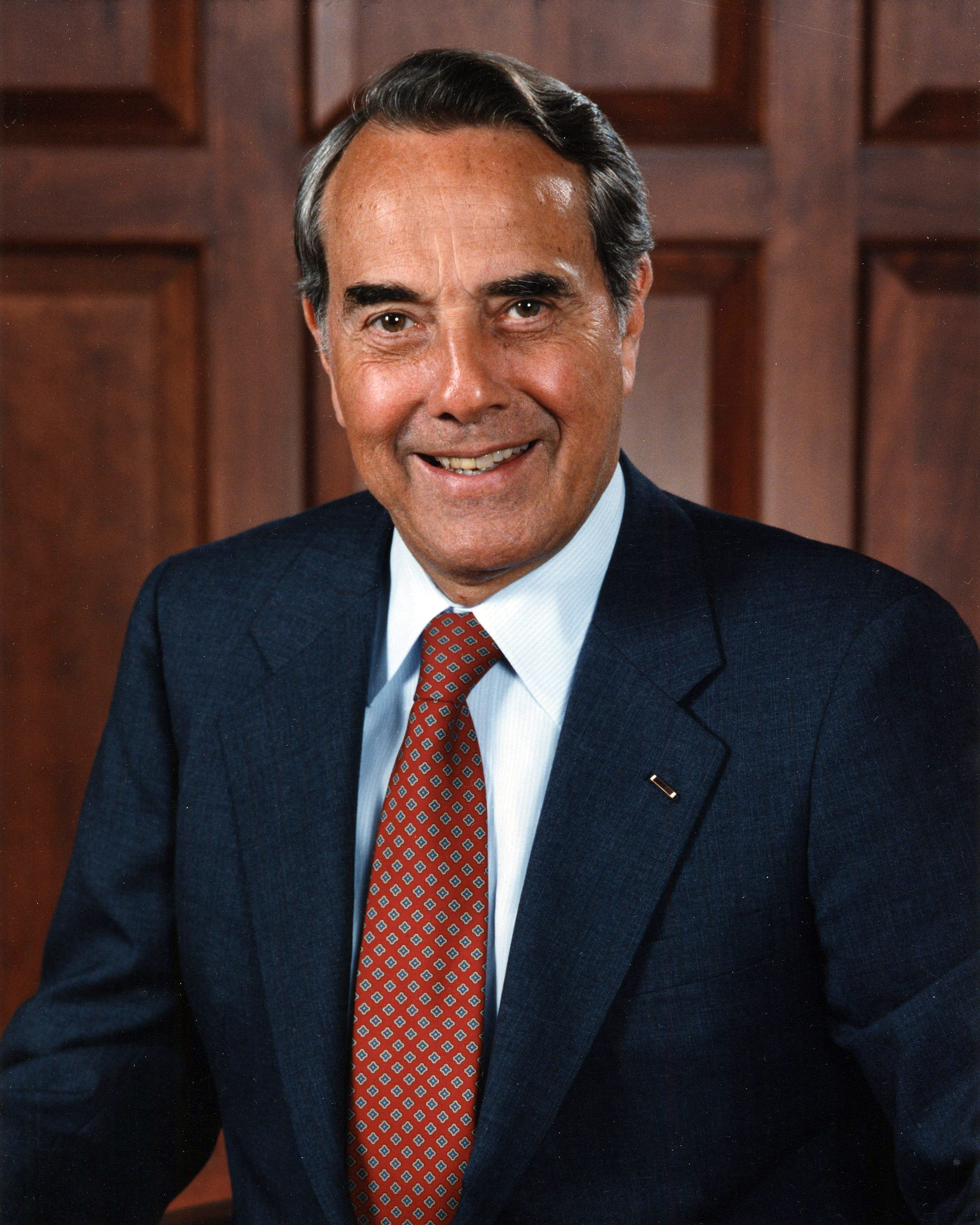
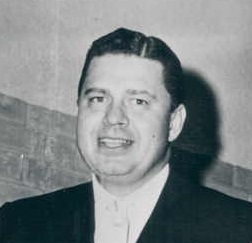
Longtime U.S. senator Bob Dole (of Kansas, left) and former NFL owner Bud Adams (right) were teammates for the Jayhawks in 1942, the only year Adams played at Kansas. Dole played for the Jayhawks as an end from 1941 to 1944 and also played basketball at Kansas.

Player	Position	Career	Occupation
Bob Dole	End	1941–44	Politician;
Bud Adams	QB	1942	Businessman; founding owner of the Tennessee Titans
Keith Loneker	G	1989–92	Actor
Micah Brown	WR	2005–08	Filmmaker

=== Naismith Basketball Hall of Famers ===
Two members of the Naismith Basketball Hall of Fame have been associated with Kansas football

Name	Reason associated with Kansas football
Phog Allen	Head coach 1920 season
Ralph Miller	Quarterback on team 1937–1941

=== Jayhawks in the pros ===
==== NFL ====
Players listed below are former Kansas football players on an active NFL roster.

- Hakeem Adeniji, OT, Baltimore Ravens
- Dorance Armstrong, DE, Washington Commanders
- Austin Booker, DE, Chicago Bears
- Cobee Bryant, CB, Atlanta Falcons
- Bryce Cabeldue, OT, Seattle Seahawks
- Enrique Cruz Jr., OT, San Francisco 49ers
- Emmanuel Henderson, WR, Seattle Seahawks
- Devin Neal, RB, New Orleans Saints
- Dominick Puni, G, San Francisco 49ers
- Quentin Skinner, WR, Buffalo Bills

=== Jayhawks as coaches ===
- Joe Dineen (LB, 2014–18), Kansas defensive ends coach
- Kevin Kane (LB, 2002–05), Purdue defensive coordinator
- Darrin Simmons, (P, 1993–95), Cincinnati Bengals assistant head coach/special teams coordinator
- A.J. Steward (WR, 2007–11), UCLA running backs coach

== Head coaches ==
The Jayhawks have had 38 official head coaches, while one unofficial player-coach, Will Coleman, coached the team in their first year of existence in 1890. The Jayhawks head coach since 2021 has been Lance Leipold. They have played in more than 1200 games in their 123 seasons. During that time, seven head coaches have led the Jayhawks to postseason bowl games: George Sauer, Jack Mitchell, Pepper Rodgers, Don Fambrough, Bud Moore, Glen Mason, and Mark Mangino. Six coaches have also won conference championships: A. W. Shepard, Hector Cowan, A. R. Kennedy, Homer Woodson "Bill" Hargiss, George Sauer, and Pepper Rodgers. Mason is the all-time leader in games coached at 101, while Mitchell and Mason are tied for the most years coached at nine. Kennedy is the leader in all-time wins at 52, and Wylie G. Woodruff leads in winning percentage among coaches who coached more than 1 year with a winning percentage of .833 with Kennedy just behind with a winning percentage of .831. As of the end of the 2017 season, David Beaty has the worst percentage among coaches who coached more than one season with a winning percentage of .083. Naismith Memorial Basketball Hall of Fame and long time Kansas men's basketball coach Phog Allen coached the Jayhawk football team in 1920. In his lone season as the football coach, the Jayhawks had a 5–2–1 record.

Of the 37 different head coaches who have led the Jayhawks, only Cowan, and Yost have been inducted into the College Football Hall of Fame. Mark Mangino received 9 different coach of the year awards in 2007.

=== Coaching staff in the Lance Leipold Era ===
Year
2021 Kansas Jayhawks Coaching Staff
2022 Kansas Jayhawks Coaching Staff
2023 Kansas Jayhawks Coaching Staff
2024 Kansas Jayhawks Coaching Staff
2025 Kansas Jayhawks Coaching Staff

== Future opponents ==
=== Conference ===
Home

2026	2027
Arizona State	Arizona
BYU	Texas Tech
Baylor	Oklahoma State
UCF	Kansas State
	Iowa State

Away

2026	2027
Utah	BYU
TCU	Colorado
Oklahoma State	Houston
Kansas State	Cincinnati
West Virginia	

=== Non-conference ===
Future schedules are based on official announcements from Kansas and the schedule taken from future schedules on their website. Announced schedules as of August 13, 2026.

2026	2027	2028	2029	2030	2031	2032
LIU	Louisiana Tech	at Hawaii	Colgate	Virginia	at Missouri	Missouri
Missouri	Southeast Missouri State	Lindenwood	at Virginia	at Fresno State	Fresno State	Hawaii
Middle Tennessee	at Washington State	Washington State	Nevada			

== See also ==
- American football in the United States
- College football
