= Travis Goff =

American college athletic administrator

Current position
- Title: Athletic director
- Team: Kansas
- Conference: Big 12

Biographical details
- Born: September 28, 1979 (age 47); Dodge City, Kansas, U.S.
- Education: University of Kansas (BS); Tulane University (MBA)

Administrative career (AD unless noted)
- 2002–2004: Kansas (Membership coordinator)
- 2005–2006: Tulane (Director of development)
- 2007–2012: Tulane (Senior associate AD)
- 2012–2021: Northwestern (Deputy AD)
- 2021–present: Kansas

Travis Goff (born September 28, 1979) is an American athletics director at the University of Kansas. Prior to being named as Kansas' athletic director, Goff spent the previous twenty years as a development administrator in college athletics, which he began at his alma mater, Kansas, with his career including stops at Tulane University and Northwestern University.

== Biography ==
=== Early years ===
Born in Dodge City, Kansas, Goff attended the University of Kansas, where he graduated in 2002 with a bachelor’s in journalism and sociology.

=== Early career ===
Upon graduating from Kansas, he began his career full-time as membership services coordinator for the Williams Fund in the Kansas Athletics department. After two years at his alma mater, Goff left for Tulane University where he served as director of development for the athletics department, while obtaining his master in business administration.

=== Tulane University ===
Goff was hired to be the development director for Tulane Athletics in 2006. During his six years at Tulane, Goff led a campaign fundraising more than $70 million to build a new football stadium, replacing the Mercedes-Benz Superdome as the home football stadium. He also oversaw athletic marketing and ticket sales.

=== Northwestern University ===
On September 20, 2012, Goff was named Northwestern's deputy athletics director for athletics and recreation development. During his nine years at Northwestern, he helped fundraise over $440 million, which helped renovate Welsh–Ryan Arena, build new facilities off the shore of Lake Michigan and other athletic facilities.

=== University of Kansas ===
On April 5, 2021, Kansas chancellor Doug Girod named Goff the 16th director of athletics for the University of Kansas. Goff was tasked with finding a new football coach and almost one month later, he named Lance Leipold the 40th head football coach. Goff was also tasked with possible punishments for the men's basketball team's involvement in the 2017–18 NCAA Division I men's basketball corruption scandal. On November 2, 2022, Goff suspended head coach Bill Self and assistant coach Kurtis Townsend for four games, as well as reducing to four official visits during the 2022–23 and 2023–24 academic years, three men's basketball scholarships for three years, and implemented a six-week ban on recruiting communications and unofficial visits.

In fiscal year 2025, Goff was the highest paid employee of the state of Kansas, with a reported salary of $1,546,269.
