= Big Jay (mascot) =

One of the official mascots of Kansas Jayhawks

- University: University of Kansas
- Conference: Big 12
- Description: Larger Jayhawk costume
- First seen: 1960s
- Related mascot(s): Baby Jay

Big Jay is one of the costume mascots of the Kansas Jayhawks. Together, Big Jay and Baby Jay are Jayhawks and are the mascots used by the University of Kansas. Another mascot named Centennial Jay was temporarily used in 2012.

== History ==
The original mascot for the Kansas Jayhawks was a bulldog. In 1912, the Jayhawk was first seen in a cartoon by Henry Maloy in The University Daily Kansan.

In November 1958, the Jayhawk became the official mascot for Kansas University. The "Jayhawk" idea came from the combination of a blue jay and a sparrow hawk.

The costume for Big Jay requires the wearer to be 6'1" - 6'5" tall.

== See also ==
- List of U.S. college mascots
- University of Kansas
