= Baby Jay (mascot) =

One of the official mascots of Kansas Jayhawks

- University: University of Kansas
- Conference: Big 12
- Description: Smaller Jayhawk costume
- First seen: 1971
- Related mascot(s): Big Jay

Baby Jay is one of the costume mascots of the Kansas Jayhawks. Together, Big Jay and Baby Jay are Jayhawks and are the mascots used by the University of Kansas. Another mascot named Centennial Jay was temporarily used in 2012.

Baby Jay was created by student Amy Sue Hurst and "hatched" at half-time of KU's Homecoming victory in football over Kansas State University on October 9, 1971, and has served as a mascot ever since.

== History ==
In 1970 Amy Hurst saw a Jayhawk bumper sticker depicting Big Jay and hatchlings, which inspired her to create a new mascot. After talking to a co-worker who was a Big Jay and getting approval from the KU Alumni Association she created Baby Jay.

The official debut of Baby Jay was October 9, 1971 during the half-time of KU's homecoming game against in-state rivals Kansas State University. In front of 55,000 fans Big Jay hauled a large egg to the 50-yard line of Memorial Stadium. A few moments later Baby Jay "hatched" from the artificial egg and has served as an ambassador of KU at events across the country ever since.

The original costume, which consisted of chicken wire, fiberglass, and felt, weighed 30 pounds. The total cost was $53. In 2003, Amy Hurst, the original Baby Jay, started a fund to help cover the cost of the now $5,000 costume that is replaced every two years.

== Selection process ==
The selection process to become Baby Jay is generally during the spring semester. Baby Jay is typically a female student and must be between 4' 11" and 5' 1" tall. The auditioning process may also include 20 minutes of running, performing an entrance and exit routine, emotion and reaction exercises.

== Duties ==
The primary duty of Baby Jay is to be an ambassador of KU, roaming the sidelines at football and basketball games giving hugs to youngsters. Baby Jay, being smaller than Big Jay, is often involved in entertaining children. Baby Jay is also present at most major university events such as athletic competitions, Tradition Night, Band Spectacular, and graduation.

Baby Jay is also seen in the community attending weddings, opening the Godzilla film festival, or even lobbying legislators to fund higher education. In return for these services Baby Jay receives a $300 scholarship per semester.

== See also ==
- List of U.S. college mascots
- University of Kansas
