= List of Kansas Jayhawks head football coaches =

The Kansas Jayhawks football program is a college football team that represents the University of Kansas in the Big 12 Conference in the National Collegiate Athletic Association. The Jayhawks head coach is Lance Leipold. The team has had 40 head coaches since it started playing organized football in 1890 with the nickname Jayhawks. The team played its first season without an official head coach, however, Will Coleman, starting center on the inaugural team, served as the team's head coach. Edwin Mortimer Hopkins was the Jayhawks first official head coach. He served as the head coach only for the 1891 team finishing the season 7–0–1. Kansas joined the Missouri Valley Intercollegiate Athletic Association in 1907. After several changes, the conference eventually became the Big Eight Conference. The Jayhawks became a charter member of the Big 12 in 1996 when the Big Eight disbanded. Seven coaches have led Kansas to postseason bowl games: George Sauer, Jack Mitchell, Pepper Rodgers, Don Fambrough, Bud Moore, Glen Mason and Mark Mangino. Four coaches have won conference championships with the Jayhawks: A. R. Kennedy, Bill Hargiss, Sauer and Rodgers.

Mason is the all-time leader in games coached (102), and is tied with Mitchell for most years coached with nine. Kennedy is the all-time leader in total wins with 52. Fielding H. Yost has the highest winning percentage of any Jayhawk coach with a 10–0 record (1.000) his only year. Of coaches who served more than one season, Wylie G. Woodruff leads with a .833 winning percentage, barely edging out Kennedy's winning percentage of .831. David Beaty is, in terms of winning percentage, the worst coach the Jayhawks have had (.125). Of the 39 Kansas coaches, Yost is the only one that has been inducted into the College Football Hall of Fame as a coach. Mangino won several coach of the year accolades after the 2007 season, the only Jayhawks coach to do so.

== Key ==
Key to symbols in coaches list
General		Overall		Conference		Postseason (Note: Although the first Rose Bowl Game was played in 1902, it has been continuously played since the 1916 game, and is recognized as the oldest bowl game by the NCAA. "—" indicates any season prior to 1916 when postseason games were not played.)	
No.	Order of coaches (Note: A running total of the number of head coaches, with coaches who served separate tenures being counted only once. Interim head coaches are represented with "Int" and are not counted in the running total. "—" indicates the team played but either without a coach or no coach is on record. "X" indicates an interim year without play.)	GC	Games coached	CW	Conference wins	PW	Postseason wins
DC	Division championships	OW	Overall wins	CL	Conference losses	PL	Postseason losses
CC	Conference championships	OL	Overall losses	CT	Conference ties	PT	Postseason ties
NC	National championships	OT	Overall ties (Note: Overtime rules in college football were introduced in 1996, making ties impossible in the period since.)	C%	Conference winning percentage		
†	Elected to the College Football Hall of Fame	O%	Overall winning percentage (Note: When computing the win–loss percentage, a tie counts as half a win and half a loss.)				

== Coaches ==
List of head football coaches showing season(s) coached, overall records, conference records, postseason records, championships and selected awards (Note: Statistics correct as of the end of the 2025 NCAA Division I FBS football season.)
#	Name	Term	GC	W	L	T	%	CW	CL	CT	C%	BW	BL	CC	Awards and other notes
1	Edwin Mortimer Hopkins	1891	8	7	0	1	.938	—	—	—	—	—	—	—	—
2	A. W. Shepard	1892–1893	15	9	6	0	.600	—	—	—	—	—	—	—	—
3	Hector Cowan^{†}	1894–1896	23	15	7	1	.674	—	—	—	—	—	—	—	—
4	Wylie G. Woodruff	1897–1898	18	15	3	0	.833	—	—	—	—	—	—	—	—
5	Fielding H. Yost^{†}	1899	10	10	0	0	1.000	—	—	—	—	—	—	—	—
6	Larry Boynton	1900	9	2	5	2	.333	—	—	—	—	—	—	—	—
7	John H. Outland^{†}	1901	10	3	5	2	.400	—	—	—	—	—	—	—	—
8	Arthur Hale Curtis	1902	10	6	4	0	.600	—	—	—	—	—	—	—	—
9	Harrison Weeks	1903	9	6	3	0	.667	—	—	—	—	—	—	—	Fired for having a sexual relationship with a KU freshman girl. He was 24 at the time.
10	A. R. Kennedy	1904–1910	65	52	9	4	.831	9	3	1	.731	—	—	1	Forced out by conference rule change requiring coaches to be full-time faculty members.
11	Ralph W. Sherwin	1911	8	4	2	2	.625	1	1	1	.500	—	—	0	—
12	Arthur Mosse	1912–1913	16	9	7	0	.563	4	4	0	.500	—	—	0	—
13	H. M. Wheaton	1914	8	5	2	1	.688	2	2	0	.500	—	—	0	—
14	Herman Olcott	1915–1917	24	16	7	1	.688	7	4	1	.625	—	—	0	—
15	Jay Bond	1918	4	2	2	0	.500	—	—	—	—	—	—	—	—
16	Leon McCarty	1919	8	3	2	3	.563	1	1	1	.500	—	—	0	—
17	Phog Allen	1920	8	5	2	1	.688	3	2	0	.600	—	—	0	Best known for his tenure as men's basketball coach, member of Naismith Memorial Basketball Hall of Fame as a coach
18	Potsy Clark	1921–1925	39	16	17	6	.487	11	15	6	.438	—	—	0	—
19	Frank Cappon	1926–1927	16	5	10	1	.344	4	8	1	.346	—	—	0	—
20	Bill Hargiss	1928–1932	42	22	18	2	.548	8	11	1	.425	—	—	1	—
21	Adrian Lindsey (Note: Adrian Lindsey took over for Bill Hargiss midway through the 1932 season.)	1932–1938	61	23	30	8	.443	11	18	5	.397	—	—	0	—
22	Gwinn Henry	1939–1942	36	9	27	0	.250	4	16	0	.200	—	—	0	—
23	Henry Shenk	1943–1945	30	11	16	3	.417	4	10	1	.300	—	—	0	—
24	George Sauer	1946–1947	21	15	3	3	.786	8	1	1	.850	0	1	2	Accepted Navy job
25	Jules V. Sikes	1948–1953	60	35	25	0	.583	18	18	0	.500	—	—	0	—
26	Chuck Mather	1954–1957	40	11	26	3	.313	7	16	1	.313	—	—	0	—
27	Jack Mitchell	1958–1966	91	42	44	5	.489	29	28	4	.508	1	0	0	—
28	Pepper Rodgers	1967–1970	42	20	22	0	.476	13	15	0	.464	0	1	1	Accepted UCLA job
29	Don Fambrough	1971–1974, 1979–1982	90	37	48	5	.439	20	33	3	.384	0	1	0	—
30	Bud Moore	1975–1978	45	17	21	1	.449	8	19	1	.304	0	1	0	—
31	Mike Gottfried	1983–1985	34	15	18	1	.456	8	13	0	.381	—	—	0	Accepted Pittsburgh job
32	Bob Valesente	1986–1987	22	4	17	1	.205	0	13	1	.036	—	—	0	—
33	Glen Mason	1988–1996	102	47	54	1	.466	25	38	1	.398	2	0	0	Accepted Minnesota job
34	Terry Allen	1997–2001	53	20	33	0	.377	10	30	0	.250	—	—	0	Fired after eight games of 2001 season.
Int	Tom Hayes (Note: Tom Hayes was named the interim head coach after Terry Allen was fired in November 2001.)	2001	3	1	2	0	.333	0	2	0	.000	—	—	0	—
35	Mark Mangino	2002–2009	98	50	48	0	.510	23	41	0	.359	3	1	0	Big 12 Coach of the Year (2007); Walter Camp Coach of the Year (2007); AP National Coach of the Year (2007); Eddie Robinson Coach of the Year (2007); The Home Depot Coach of the Year Award (2007); Sporting News College Football Coach of the Year (2007); Woody Hayes Trophy (2007); George Munger Award (2007); AFCA Coach of the Year (2007); Paul "Bear" Bryant Award (2007) Resigned following the launch of an investigation of his coaching practices.
36	Turner Gill	2010–2011	24	5	19	0	.208	1	16	0	.059	0	0	0	—
37	Charlie Weis	2012–2014	27	5	22	0	.185	1	18	0	.053	0	0	0	Fired four games into the 2014 season
Int	Clint Bowen	2014	8	1	7	0	.125	1	7	0	.125	0	0	0	Interim Head Coach after Charlie Weis was fired
38	David Beaty	2015–2018	48	6	42	0	.125	2	34	0	.056	0	0	0	Fired after the end of the 2018 season
39	Les Miles	2019–2020	21	3	18	0	.150	1	16	0	.063	0	0	0	Mutually agreed to part with Kansas after allegations of inappropriate conduct with female students while at LSU.
40	Lance Leipold	2021–present	62	27	35	0	.435	16	29	0	.356	1	1	0	

=== Gallery of coaches ===
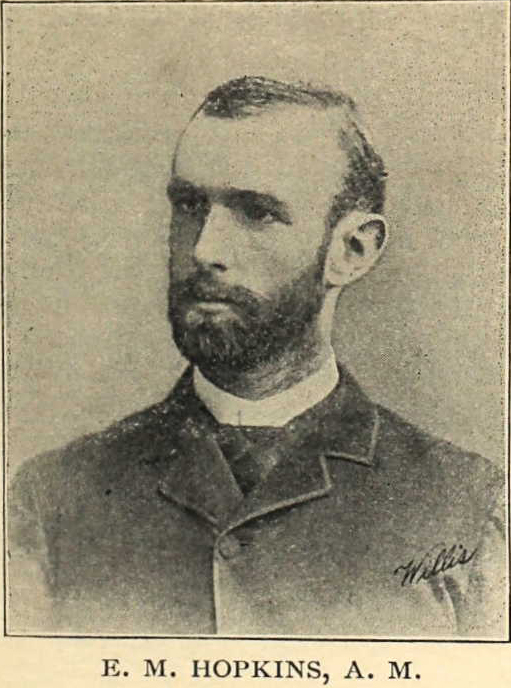
Edwin Mortimer Hopkins

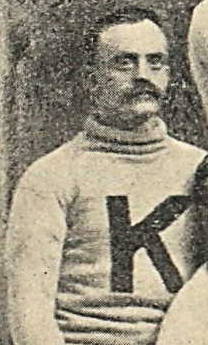
A.W. Shepard

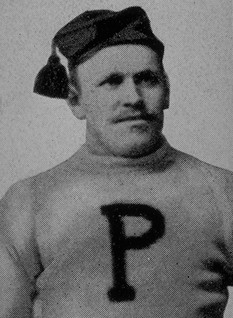
Hector Cowan

Wylie G. Woodruff

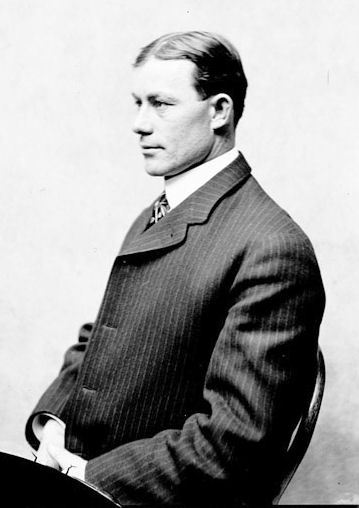
Fielding Yost

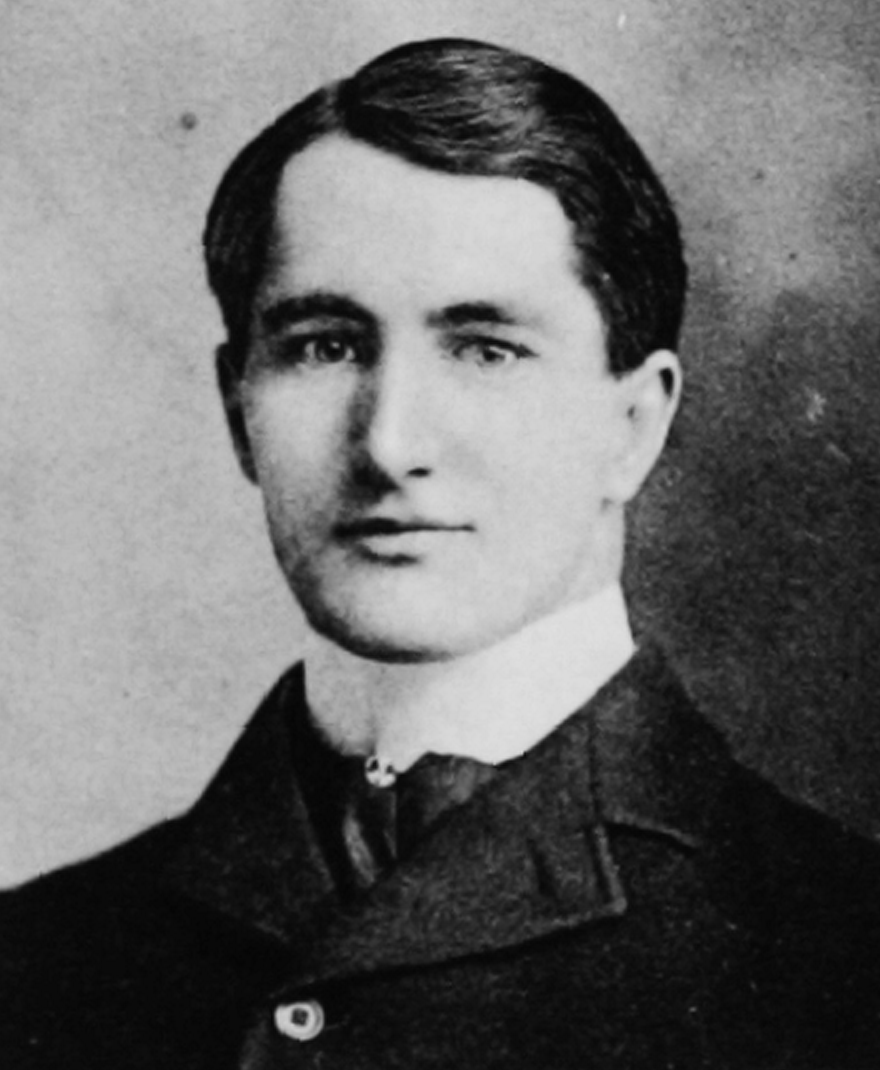
Larry Boynton

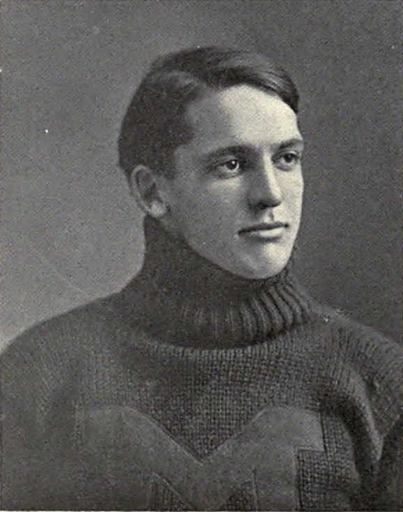
Boss Weeks

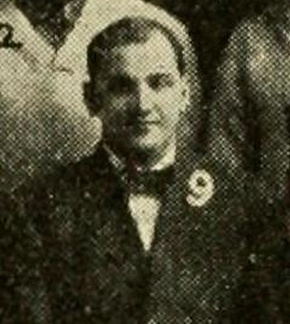
A.R. Kennedy

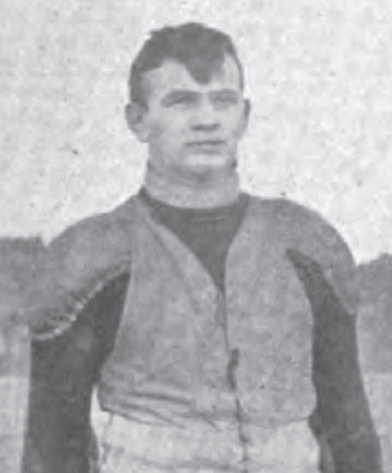
Ralph W. Sherwin

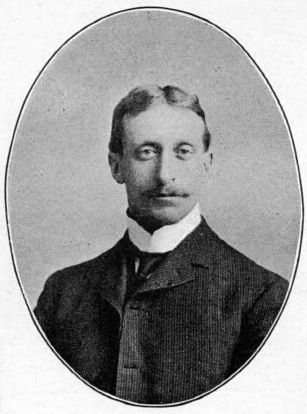
Arthur Mosse

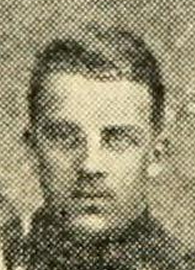
H.M. Wheaton

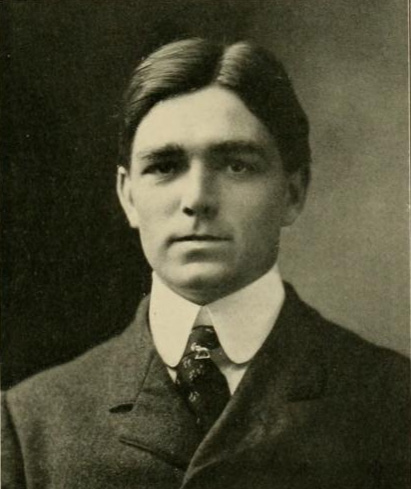
Herman Olcott

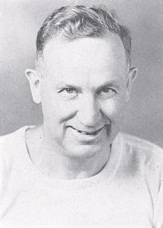
George "Potsy" Clark

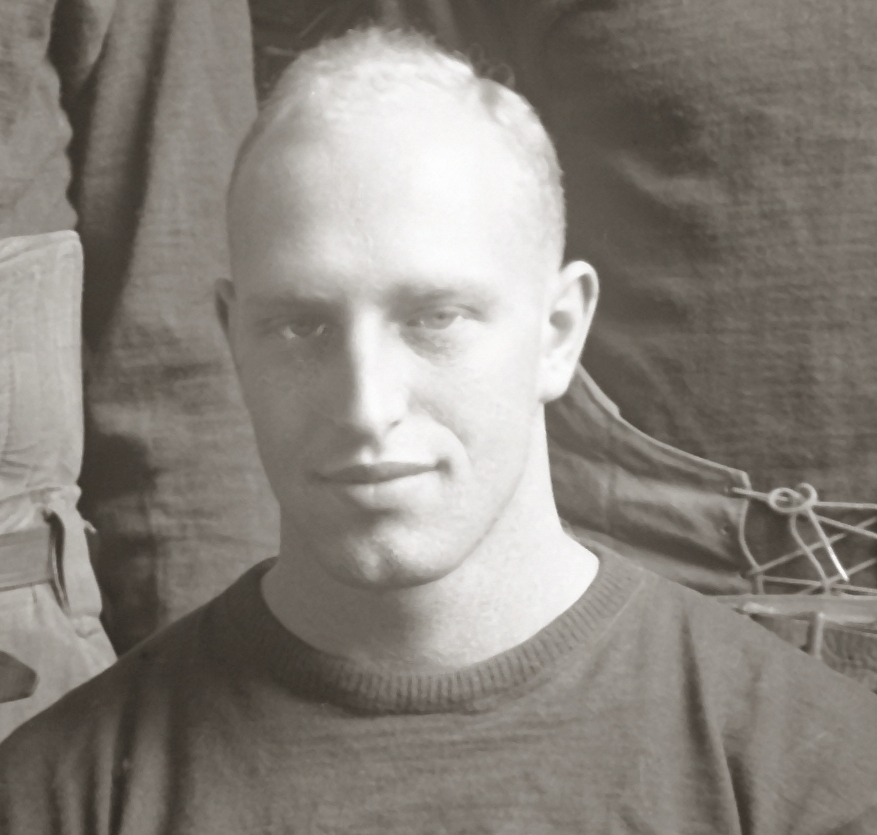
Franklin Cappon

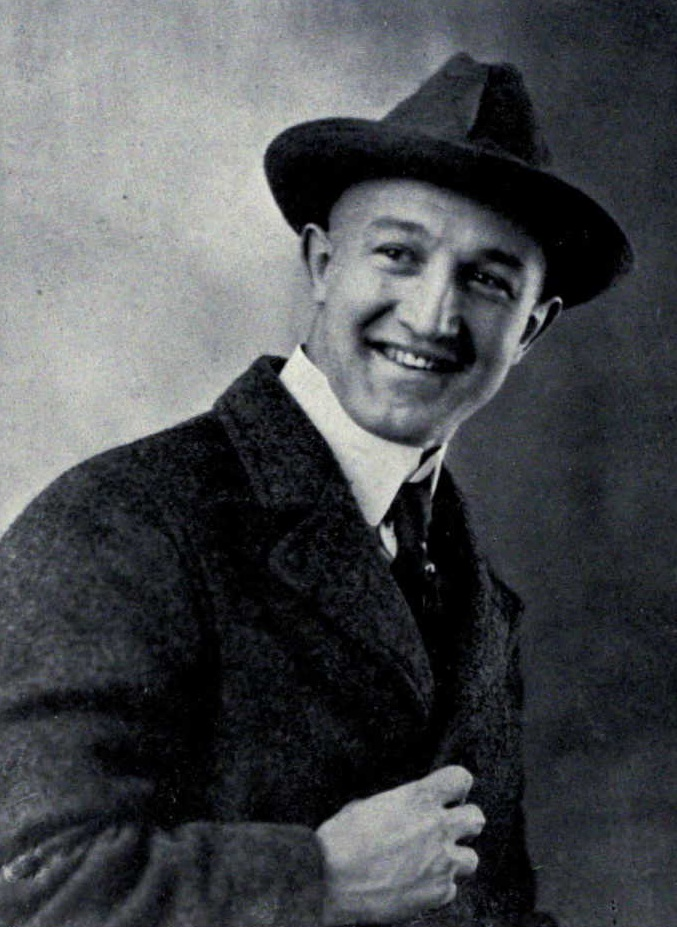
Bill Hargiss

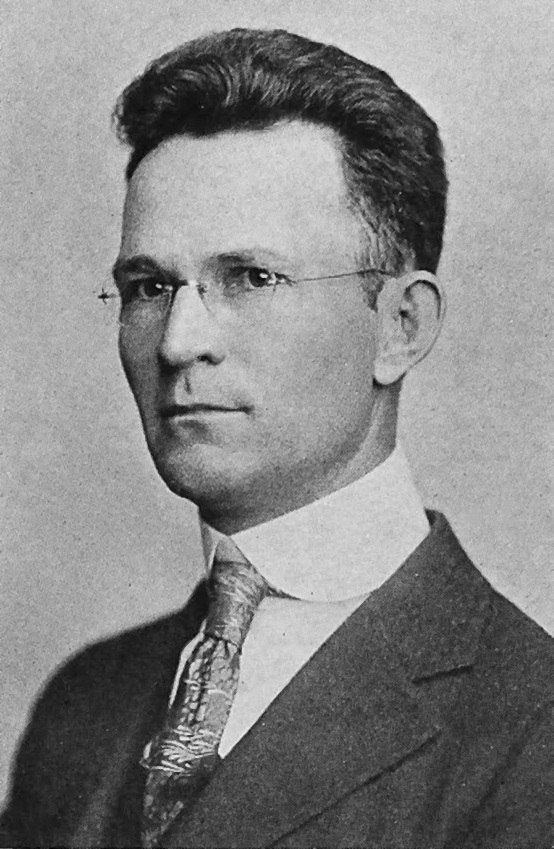
Gwinn Henry

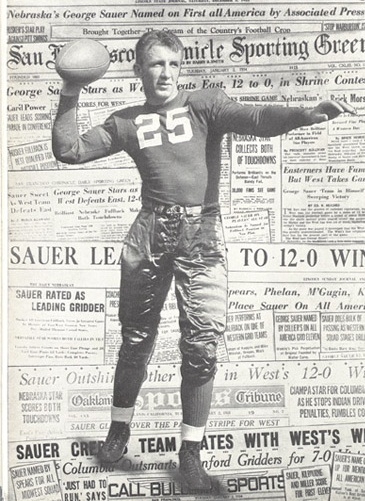
George Sauer

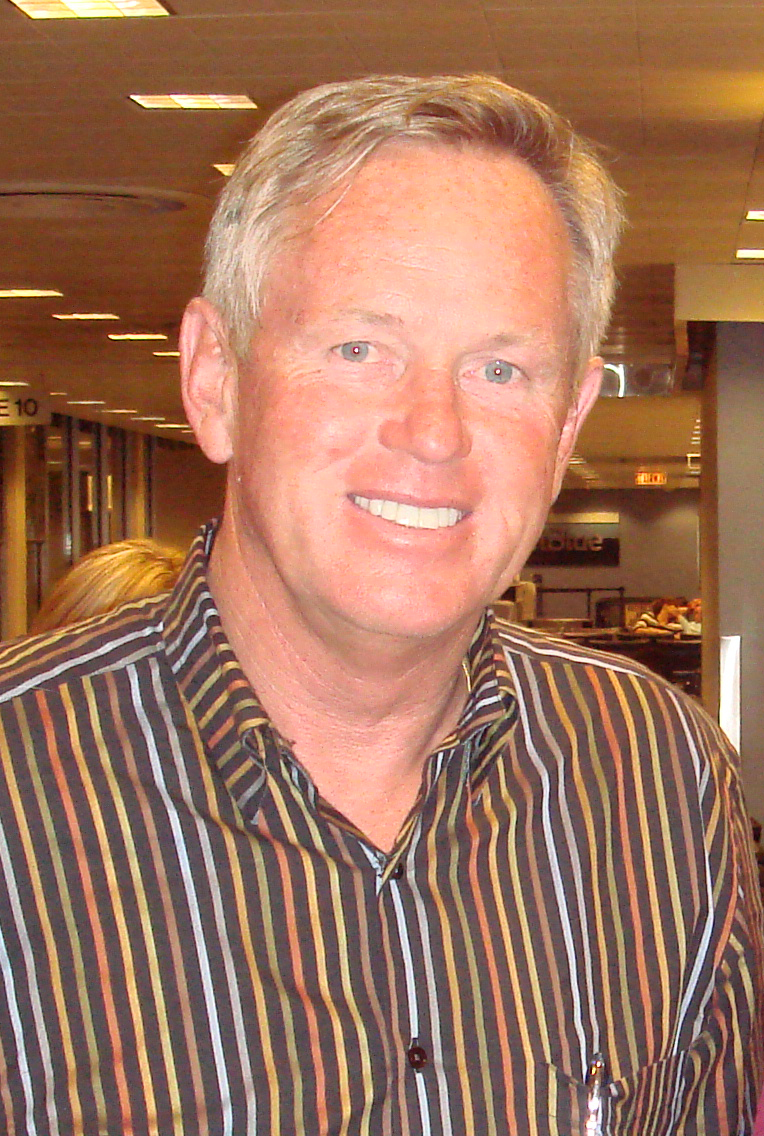
Glen Mason

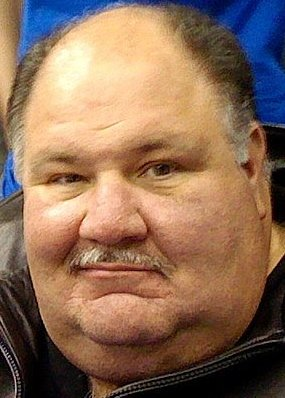
Mark Mangino

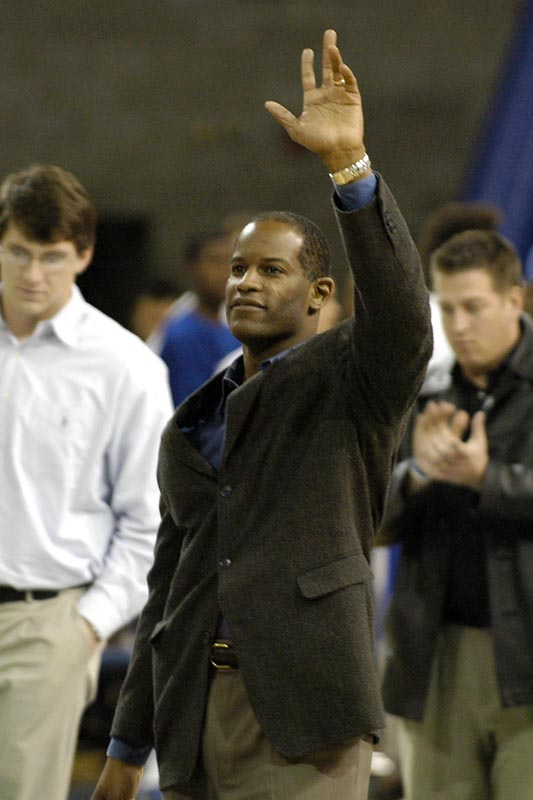
Turner Gill

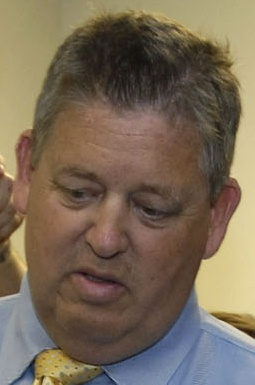
Charlie Weis

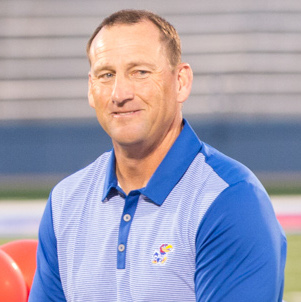
David Beaty

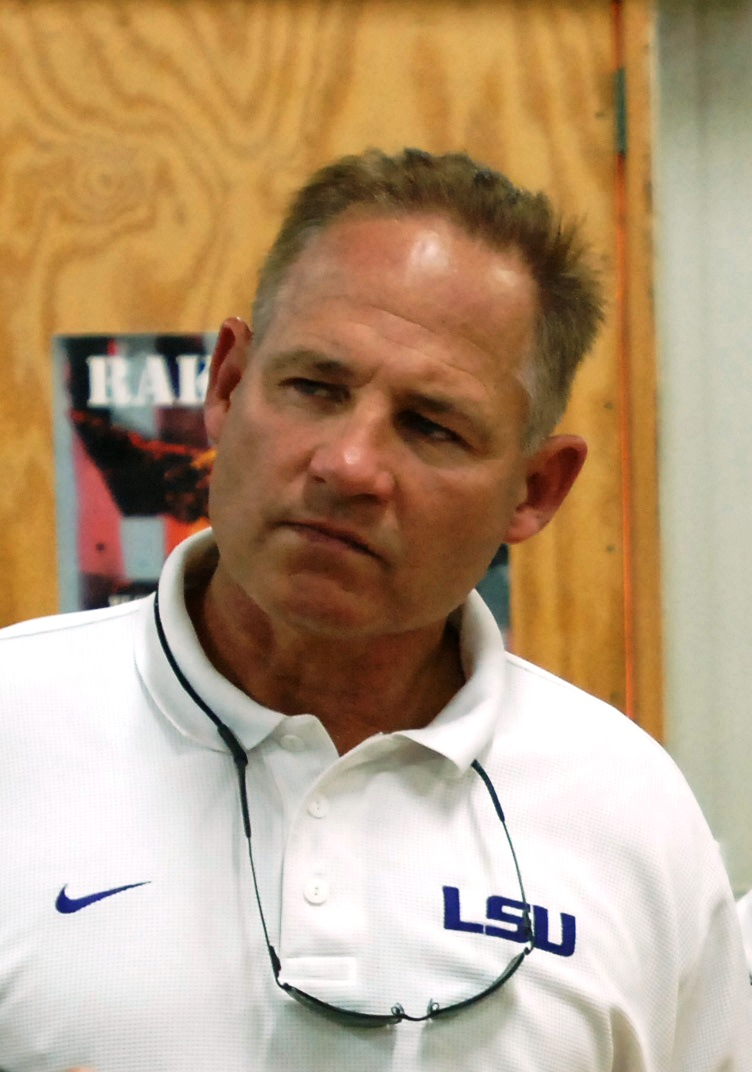
Les Miles
