= List of Harvard Crimson football seasons =

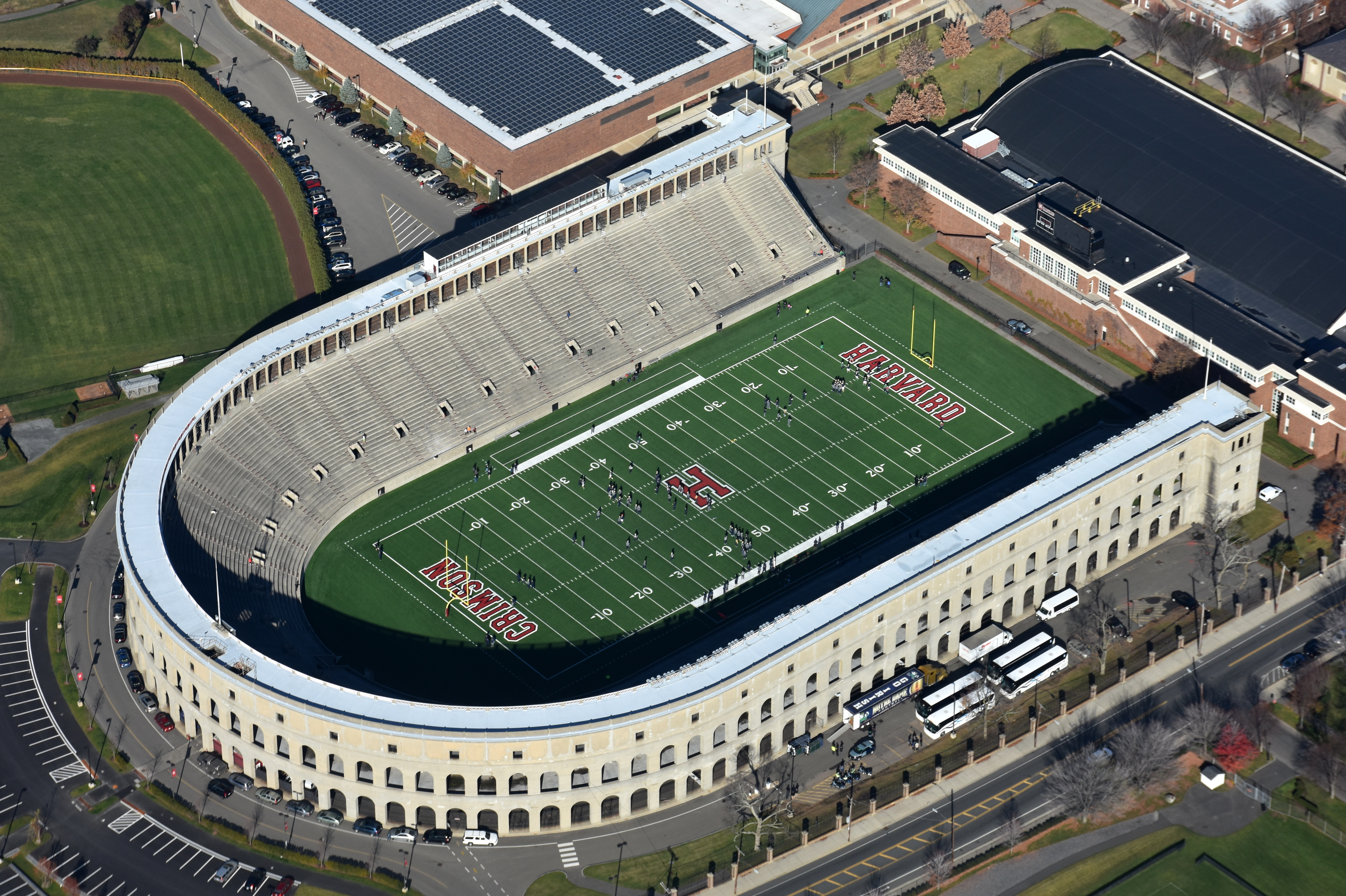
Harvard Stadium, where the Harvard Crimson have played their home games since 1903.

This is a list of seasons completed by the Harvard Crimson football team of the National Collegiate Athletic Association (NCAA) Division I Football Championship Subdivision (FCS). Since the team's founding, the Crimson have participated in over 1,300 officially sanctioned games, with an all-time record of 918–415–50. Harvard originally competed as a football independent before joining the Ivy League in 1956 as a founding member.

== Seasons ==
Year	Coach	Overall	Conference	Standing	Bowl/playoffs	Coaches^{#}	AP^{°}
Independent (1873–1880)
1873	No coach	1–0–1					
1874	No coach	1–1					
1875	No coach	4–0					
1876	No coach	3–1					
1877	No coach	3–1					
1878	No coach	1–2					
1879	No coach	2–1–2					
1880	No coach	2–2–2					
Lucius Littauer (Independent) (1881)
1881	Lucius Littauer	6–1–1					
Independent (1882–1885)
1882	No coach	7–1					
1883	No coach	8–2					
1884	No coach	7–4					
1885	No team						
Frank Mason (Independent) (1886)
1886	Frank Mason	12–2					
Independent (1887–1889)
1887	No coach	10–1					
1888	No coach	12–1					
1889	No coach	9–2					
George Stewart & George Adams (Independent) (1890–1892)
1890	Stewart & Adams	11–0					
1891	Stewart & Adams	13–1					
1892	Stewart & Adams	10–1					
George Stewart & Everett Lake (Independent) (1893)
1893	Stewart & Lake	12–1					
William A. Brooks (Independent) (1894)
1894	William A. Brooks	11–2					
Robert Emmons (Independent) (1895)
1895	Robert Emmons	8–2–1					
Bert Waters (Independent) (1894)
1896	Bert Waters	7–4					
William Cameron Forbes (Independent) (1897–1898)
1897	William Cameron Forbes	10–1–1					
1898	William Cameron Forbes	11–0					
Benjamin Dibblee (Independent) (1899–1900)
1899	Benjamin Dibblee	10–0–1					
1900	Benjamin Dibblee	10–1					
Bill Reid (Independent) (1901)
1901	Bill Reid	12–0					
John Farley (Independent) (1902)
1902	John Farley	11–1					
John Cranston (Independent) (1903)
1903	John Cranston	9–3					
Edgar Wrightington (Independent) (1904)
1904	Edgar Wrightington	7–2–1					
Bill Reid (Independent) (1905–1906)
1905	Bill Reid	8–2–1					
1906	Bill Reid	10–1					
Joshua Crane (Independent) (1907)
1907	Joshua Crane	7–3					
Percy Haughton (Independent) (1908–1916)
1908	Percy Haughton	9–0–1					
1909	Percy Haughton	8–1					
1910	Percy Haughton	8–0–1					
1911	Percy Haughton	6–2–1					
1912	Percy Haughton	9–0					
1913	Percy Haughton	9–0					
1914	Percy Haughton	7–0–2					
1915	Percy Haughton	8–1					
1916	Percy Haughton	7–3					
Wingate Rollins (Independent) (1917)
1917	Wingate Rollins	3–1–3					
Pooch Donovan (Independent) (1918)
1918	Pooch Donovan	2–1					
Robert Fisher (Independent) (1919–1925)
1919	Robert Fisher	9–0–1			W Rose		
1920	Robert Fisher	8–0–1					
1921	Robert Fisher	7–2–1					
1922	Robert Fisher	7–2					
1923	Robert Fisher	4–3–1					
1924	Robert Fisher	4–4					
1925	Robert Fisher	4–3–1					
Arnold Horween (Independent) (1926–1930)
1926	Arnold Horween	3–5					
1927	Arnold Horween	4–4					
1928	Arnold Horween	5–2–1					
1929	Arnold Horween	5–2–1					
1930	Arnold Horween	4–4–1					
Eddie Casey (Independent) (1931–1934)
1931	Eddie Casey	7–1					
1932	Eddie Casey	5–3					
1933	Eddie Casey	5–2–1					
1934	Eddie Casey	3–5					
Dick Harlow (Independent) (1935–1942)
1935	Dick Harlow	3–5					
1936	Dick Harlow	3–4–1					
1937	Dick Harlow	5–2–1					
1938	Dick Harlow	4–4					
1939	Dick Harlow	4–4					
1940	Dick Harlow	3–2–3					
1941	Dick Harlow	5–2–1					
1942	Dick Harlow	2–6–1					
Henry Lamar (Independent) (1943–1944)
1943	Henry Lamar	2–2–1					
1944	Henry Lamar	5–1					
Dick Harlow (Independent) (1945–1947)
1945	Dick Harlow	5–3					
1946	Dick Harlow	7–2					
1947	Dick Harlow	4–5					
Arthur Valpey (Independent) (1948–1949)
1948	Arthur Valpey	4–4					
1949	Arthur Valpey	1–8					
Lloyd Jordan (Independent) (1950–1955)
1950	Lloyd Jordan	1–7					
1951	Lloyd Jordan	3–5–1					
1952	Lloyd Jordan	5–4					
1953	Lloyd Jordan	6–2					
1954	Lloyd Jordan	4–3–1					
1955	Lloyd Jordan	3–4–1					
Lloyd Jordan (Ivy League) (1956)
1956	Lloyd Jordan	2–6	2–5	T–6th			
John Yovicsin (Ivy League) (1957–1970)
1957	John Yovicsin	3–5	2–5	7th			
1958	John Yovicsin	4–5	3–4	6th			
1959	John Yovicsin	6–3	4–3	T–3rd			
1960	John Yovicsin	5–4	4–3	T–3rd			
1961	John Yovicsin	6–3	6–1	T–1st			
1962	John Yovicsin	6–3	5–2	2nd			
1963	John Yovicsin	5–2–2	4–2–1	3rd			
1964	John Yovicsin	6–3	5–2				
1965	John Yovicsin	5–2–2	3–2–2	3rd			
1966	John Yovicsin	8–1	6–1	T–1st			
1967	John Yovicsin	6–3	4–3	T–4th			
1968	John Yovicsin	8–0–1	6–0–1	T–1st			
1969	John Yovicsin	3–6	2–5	T–5th			
1970	John Yovicsin	7–2	5–2	T–2nd			
Joe Restic (Ivy League) (1971–1993)
1971	Joe Restic	5–4	4–3	4th			
1972	Joe Restic	4–4–1	3–3–1	5th			
1973	Joe Restic	7–2	5–2	T–2nd			
1974	Joe Restic	7–2	6–1	T–1st			
1975	Joe Restic	7–2	6–1	1st			
1976	Joe Restic	6–3	4–3	T–3rd			
1977	Joe Restic	4–5	4–3	T–3rd			
1978	Joe Restic	4–4–1	2–4–1	T–5th			
1979	Joe Restic	3–6	3–4	6th			
1980	Joe Restic	7–3	4–3	T–3rd			
1981	Joe Restic	5–4–1	4–2–1	4th			
1982	Joe Restic	7–3	5–2	T–1st			
1983	Joe Restic	6–2–2	5–1–1	T–1st			
1984	Joe Restic	5–4	5–2	T–2nd			
1985	Joe Restic	7–3	5–2	T–2nd			
1986	Joe Restic	3–7	3–4	5th			
1987	Joe Restic	8–2	6–1	1st			
1988	Joe Restic	2–8	2–5	T–6th			
1989	Joe Restic	5–5	5–2	3rd			
1990	Joe Restic	5–5	3–4	T–4th			
1991	Joe Restic	4–5–1	4–2–1	3rd			
1992	Joe Restic	3–7	3–4	5th			
1993	Joe Restic	3–7	1–6	T–7th			
Tim Murphy (Ivy League) (1994–2023)
1994	Tim Murphy	4–6	2–5	T–7th			
1995	Tim Murphy	2–8	1–6	8th			
1996	Tim Murphy	4–6	2–5	T–6th			
1997	Tim Murphy	9–1	7–0	1st			
1998	Tim Murphy	4–6	3–4	T–5th			
1999	Tim Murphy	5–5	3–4	5th			
2000	Tim Murphy	5–5	4–3	T–3rd			
2001	Tim Murphy	9–0	7–0	1st			19
2002	Tim Murphy	7–3	6–1	2nd			
2003	Tim Murphy	7–3	4–3	T–2nd			
2004	Tim Murphy	10–0	7–0	1st			13
2005	Tim Murphy	7–3	5–2	T–2nd			
2006	Tim Murphy	7–3	4–3	3rd			
2007	Tim Murphy	8–2	7–0	1st		20	21
2008	Tim Murphy	9–1	6–1	T–1st		14	15
2009	Tim Murphy	7–3	6–1	2nd			
2010	Tim Murphy	7–3	5–2	T–2nd			
2011	Tim Murphy	9–1	7–0	1st		17	16
2012	Tim Murphy	8–2	5–2	2nd			
2013	Tim Murphy	9–1	6–1	T–1st		23	
2014	Tim Murphy	10–0	7–0	1st		15	15
2015	Tim Murphy	9–1	6–1	T–1st		20	20
2016	Tim Murphy	7–3	5–2	3rd			
2017	Tim Murphy	5–5	3–4	T–5th			
2018	Tim Murphy	6–4	4–3	3rd			
2019	Tim Murphy	4–6	2–5	T–6th			
2020	No team (Note: Harvard did not compete during the 2020 season as a result of the COVID-19 pandemic and the subsequent cancellation of the Ivy League season.)						
2021	Tim Murphy	8–2	5–2	3rd			
2022	Tim Murphy	6–4	4–3	4th			
2023	Tim Murphy	8–2	5–2	T–1st			
Andrew Aurich (Ivy League) (2024–present)
2024	Andrew Aurich	8–2	5–2	T–1st			25
2025	Andrew Aurich	9–2	6–1	T–1st	L NCAA Division I First Round	23	20
Total:		918–415–50					
National championship Conference title Conference division title or championship game berth
^{†}Indicates Bowl Coalition, Bowl Alliance, BCS, or CFP / New Years' Six bowl.; ^{#}Rankings from final Coaches Poll.

== See also ==
- List of Ivy League football standings
