= 1890 Franklin & Marshall Nevonians football team =

American college football season

1890 Franklin & Marshall Nevonians football
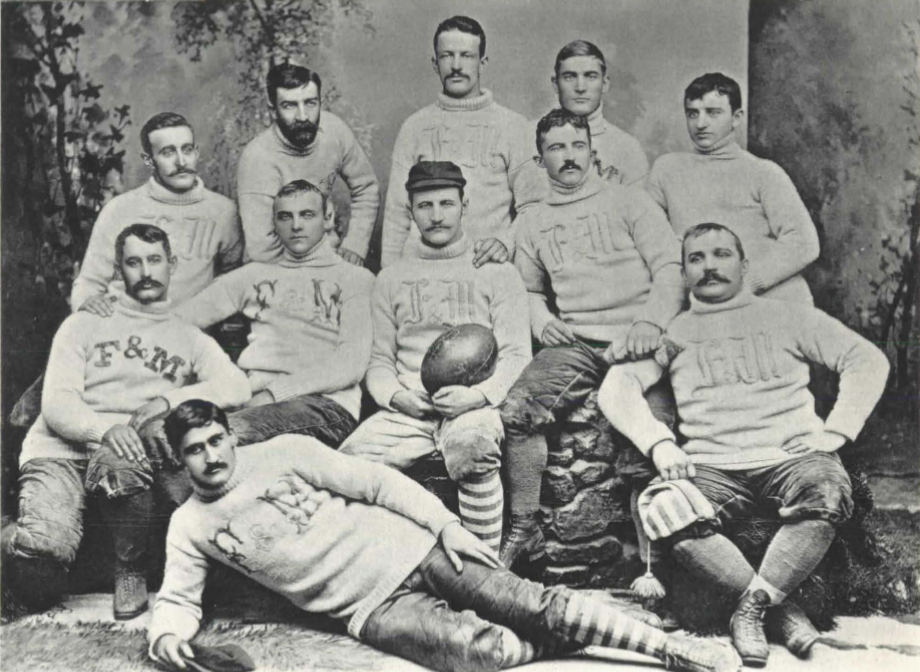
- 1890 Franklin & Marshall football team, picture in pictured in Orfilamme, Franklin & Marshall College yearbook (1892)
- Conference: Independent
- Record: 8–2
- Captain: William Mann Irvine
- Home stadium: McGrann's Park

1890 Eastern college football independents records
	Conf.			Overall
Team	W	L	T	W		L		T
Harvard		–		11	–	0	–	0
Yale		–		13	–	1	–	0
Princeton		–		11	–	1	–	1
Franklin & Marshall		–		8	–	2	–	0
Navy		–		5	–	1	–	1
Penn		–		11	–	3	–	0
Washington & Jefferson		–		2	–	1	–	0
Cornell		–		7	–	4	–	0
Lehigh		–		7	–	4	–	0
Syracuse		–		7	–	4	–	0
Springfield YMCA		–		5	–	3	–	0
Rutgers		–		5	–	5	–	1
Penn State		–		2	–	2	–	0
Western Univ. Penn		–		2	–	2	–	0
Colgate		–		1	–	1	–	0
Wesleyan		–		5	–	6	–	0
Tufts		–		2	–	3	–	0
NYU		–		2	–	4	–	0
Lafayette		–		2	–	5	–	1
Fordham		–		1	–	3	–	1
Brown		–		2	–	5	–	0
Bucknell		–		1	–	4	–	1
Massachusetts		–		1	–	4	–	0
Columbia		–		1	–	6	–	1
Army		–		0	–	1	–	0
Geneva		–		0	–	1	–	0

The 1890 Franklin & Marshall Nevonians football team was an American football team that represented Franklin & Marshall College during the 1890 college football season. The team compiled an 8–2 record. Its eight victories included games against Penn State (10–0) and Lafayette (18–10). Its two losses were against Princeton (33–16) and Penn (28–0). The team played its home games at McGrann's Park in Lancaster, Pennsylvania. William Mann Irvine was the team captain and played at the fullback position.

== Schedule ==
Date	Time	Opponent	Site	Result	Attendance	Source
October 4		at Princeton	University Field; Princeton, NJ	L 16–33		
October 11		Lafayette	McGrann's Park; Lancaster, PA	W 18–10	> 1,200	
October 13		Penn State	McGrann's Park; Lancaster, PA	W 10–0	500	
October 18	3:00 p.m.	Bucknell	McGrann's Park; Lancaster, PA	W 22–6	1,200	
October 25		at Penn	University Athletic Grounds; Philadelphia, PA	L 0–28		
November 1		at Dickinson	Carlisle, PA (rivalry)	W 10–9		
November 12		Millersville	McGrann's Park; Lancaster, PA	W 38–0		
November 22		Pennsylvania College	McGrann's Park; Lancaster, PA (rivalry)	W 68–0	500	
November 27	2:45 p.m.	Bucknell	McGrann's Park; Lancaster, PA	W 12–10	2,000	
December 2		at Fordham	Fordham College grounds; Fordham, NY	W 18–0		

== Roster ==
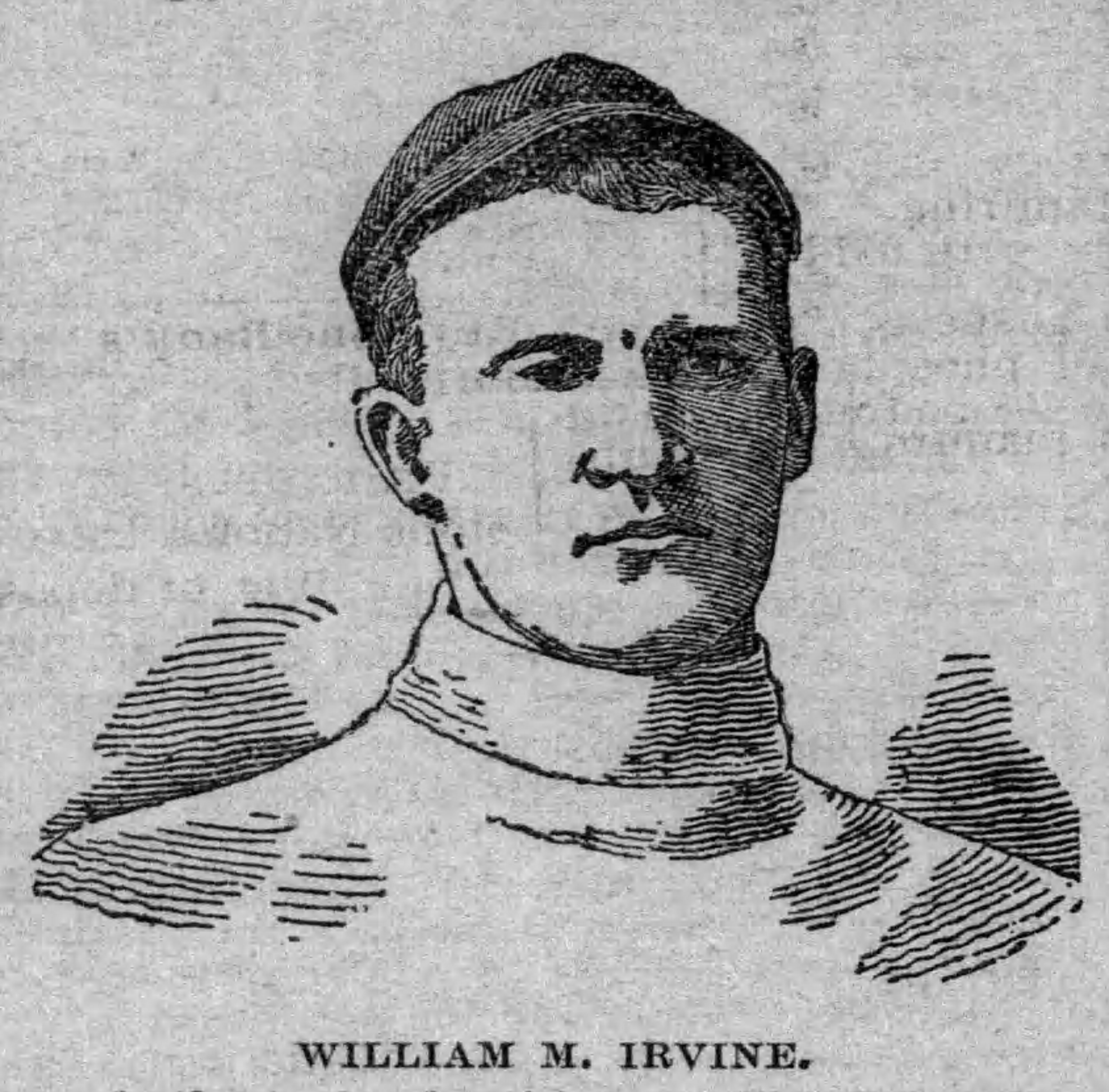
Captain William Mann Irvine

- William Mann Irvine, Sem., fullback and captain, age 25, 176 pounds, 5'11"
- E. O. Nothstein, Class of 1891, halfback, age 22, 165 pounds, 5'11"
- Calvin N. Gabriel, Class of 1891, halfback, age 24, 164 pounds, 5'10-1/2"
- J. A. Apple, Class of 1892, quarterback, age 17, 145 pounds, 5'10-1/2"
- E. W. Stonebreaker, Sem., right end, age 29, 155 pounds, 5'10-1/2"
- T. H. Krick, Class of 1892, right tackle, age 22, 170 pounds, 6'
- D. J. Wolfe, Class of 1893, right guard, age 23, 178 pounds, 5'8"
- F. M. Line, Class of 1888, center, age 23, 172 pounds, 6', 1-1/2"
- A. H. Smith, Sem., left guard, age 25, 182 pounds, 5'4-1/2"
- Simon U. Waugaman, Class of 1889, left guard (sub.), age 29, 167 pounds, 5'11-1/2"
- Anson Harrold, Class of 1891, left tackle, age 22, 180 pounds, 6'
- Bruce Griffith, Class of 1890, left end, age 23, 147 pounds, 5'7"
