= 1890 Orange Athletic Club football team =

American college football season

1890 Orange Athletic Club football
- Conference: American Football Union
- Record: 5–4–1 (3–1 AFU)

1890 American Football Union standings
	Conf.					Overall
Team	W		L		T	W		L		T
Crescent Athletic Club $	3	–	1	–	0	6	–	4	–	0
Orange Athletic Club	3	–	1	–	0	5	–	4	–	1
New York Athletic Club	0	–	4	–	0	1	–	5	–	0

The 1890 Orange Athletic Club football team was an American football team that represented the Orange Athletic Club in the American Football Union (AFU) during the 1890 football season. The Orange team played its home games in East Orange, New Jersey, and compiled a 5–4–1 record (3–1 against AFU opponents).

== Schedule ==
Date	Opponent	Site	Result	Attendance	Source
October 4	Columbia*	Orange Oval; Orange, NJ	W 21–0		
October 11	at Princeton*	Tuxedo Park, NY	T 0–0	500	
October 18	Yale*	Orange Oval; Orange, NJ	L 0–16		
October 25	Rutgers*	Orange Oval; Orange, NJ	L 4–6		
November 1	at New York Athletic Club	Polo Grounds; New York, NY	W 6–0		
November 4	at Harvard*	Jarvis Field; Cambridge, MA	L 0–33		
November 8	Crescent Athletic Club	Orange Oval; Orange, NJ	W 8–5	1,500–4,000	
November 15	Orange Athletic Club Juniors*	Orange Oval; Orange, NJ	W 14–0		
November 22	New York Athletic Club	Orange Oval; Orange, NJ	W 28–0	500	
December 6	at Crescent Athletic Club	Washington Park; Brooklyn, NY	L 0–14	550	
*Non-conference game
