= 1890 Boston Tech football team =

American college football season

1890 Boston Tech football
- Conference: Eastern Intercollegiate Football Association
- Record: 4–4–1 (0–2 EIFA)
- Head coach: None
- Home stadium: South End Grounds

1890 Eastern Intercollegiate Football Association standings
	Conf.					Overall
Team	W		L		T	W		L		T
Williams $	4	–	0	–	0	8	–	2	–	0
Amherst	3	–	1	–	0	7	–	6	–	1
Dartmouth	1	–	2	–	0	4	–	4	–	0
Boston Tech	0	–	2	–	0	4	–	4	–	1
Bowdoin	0	–	3	–	0	4	–	4	–	0
$ – Conference champion

The 1890 Boston Tech football team represented Boston Tech—now known as the Massachusetts Institute of Technology (MIT)—as a member of the Eastern Intercollegiate Football Association (EIFA) during the 1890 college football season. Boston Tech compiled an overall record of 4–4–1 with a mark of 0–2 in conference play. The team played home games at South End Grounds in Boston.

== Schedule ==
Date	Time	Opponent	Site	Result	Source
October 4	4:00 p.m.	Boston Athletic Association*	Boston, MA	W 6–4	
October 8	3:55 p.m.	Brown*	South End Grounds; Boston, MA	W 10–8	
October 11	3:00 p.m.	at Phillips Academy*	Andover, MA	L 4–11	
October 18		at Fall River*	Y. M. C. A. grounds; Fall River, MA	T 0–0	
October 25	3:00 p.m.	Phillips Exeter Academy*	Boston, MA	W 34–0	
October 29		at Phillips Exeter Academy*	Exeter, NH	W 21–6	
November 1		Amherst	South End Grounds; Boston, MA	L 4–38	
November 5		at Phillips Academy*	Andover, MA	L 0–24	
November 8	2:30 p.m.	Williams	South End Grounds; Boston, MA	L 0–36	
*Non-conference game
