= 1890 Cornell Big Red football team =

American college football season

1890 Cornell Big Red football
- Conference: Independent
- Record: 7–4
- Head coach: None
- Captain: Edwin Yawger

1890 Eastern college football independents records
	Conf.			Overall
Team	W	L	T	W		L		T
Harvard		–		11	–	0	–	0
Yale		–		13	–	1	–	0
Princeton		–		11	–	1	–	1
Franklin & Marshall		–		8	–	2	–	0
Navy		–		5	–	1	–	1
Penn		–		11	–	3	–	0
Washington & Jefferson		–		2	–	1	–	0
Cornell		–		7	–	4	–	0
Lehigh		–		7	–	4	–	0
Syracuse		–		7	–	4	–	0
Springfield YMCA		–		5	–	3	–	0
Rutgers		–		5	–	5	–	1
Penn State		–		2	–	2	–	0
Western Univ. Penn		–		2	–	2	–	0
Colgate		–		1	–	1	–	0
Wesleyan		–		5	–	6	–	0
Tufts		–		2	–	3	–	0
NYU		–		2	–	4	–	0
Lafayette		–		2	–	5	–	1
Fordham		–		1	–	3	–	1
Brown		–		2	–	5	–	0
Bucknell		–		1	–	4	–	1
Massachusetts		–		1	–	4	–	0
Columbia		–		1	–	6	–	1
Army		–		0	–	1	–	0
Geneva		–		0	–	1	–	0

The 1890 Cornell Big Red football team was an American football team that represented Cornell University during the 1890 college football season. The team compiled a 7–4 record and outscored its opponents by a combined total of 342 to 134. Cornell's 77–0 loss to Harvard remains the worst defeat in the program's history. The second-worst loss came 128 years later, a 66–0 defeat to Princeton during the 2018 season.

== Schedule ==
Date	Time	Opponent	Site	Result	Attendance	Source
October 1		Rochester	Ithaca, NY	W 98–0		
October 4		at Union (NY)	Schenectady, NY	W 32–0		
October 18		at Trinity (CT)	Hartford, CT	W 26–0		
October 31		at Williams	Weston Field; Williamstown, MA	L 8–18		
November 1		at Harvard	Jarvis Field; Cambridge, MA	L 0–77		
November 3	4:00 p.m.	at Amherst	Amherst, MA	L 0–18		
November 5		at Wesleyan	Middletown, CT	L 2–4		
November 8		Bucknell	Ithaca, NY	W 26–0		
November 15	3:00 p.m.	vs. Michigan	Recreation Park; Detroit, MI	W 20–5	2,000	
November 22		Columbia	Ithaca, NY (rivalry)	W 36–0		
November 27	2:05 p.m.	at Chicago All-University	National League Park; Chicago, IL	W 12–8	6,000	
