= 1890 Colgate football team =

American college football season

1890 Colgate football
- Conference: Independent
- Record: 1–1
- Head coach: Samuel Colgate Jr. (1st season)
- Captain: Charles DeWoody

1890 Eastern college football independents records
	Conf.			Overall
Team	W	L	T	W		L		T
Harvard		–		11	–	0	–	0
Yale		–		13	–	1	–	0
Princeton		–		11	–	1	–	1
Franklin & Marshall		–		8	–	2	–	0
Navy		–		5	–	1	–	1
Penn		–		11	–	3	–	0
Washington & Jefferson		–		2	–	1	–	0
Cornell		–		7	–	4	–	0
Lehigh		–		7	–	4	–	0
Syracuse		–		7	–	4	–	0
Springfield YMCA		–		5	–	3	–	0
Rutgers		–		5	–	5	–	1
Penn State		–		2	–	2	–	0
Western Univ. Penn		–		2	–	2	–	0
Colgate		–		1	–	1	–	0
Wesleyan		–		5	–	6	–	0
Tufts		–		2	–	3	–	0
NYU		–		2	–	4	–	0
Lafayette		–		2	–	5	–	1
Fordham		–		1	–	3	–	1
Brown		–		2	–	5	–	0
Bucknell		–		1	–	4	–	1
Massachusetts		–		1	–	4	–	0
Columbia		–		1	–	6	–	1
Army		–		0	–	1	–	0
Geneva		–		0	–	1	–	0

The 1890 Colgate football team represented Colgate University in the 1890 college football season.

== Schedule ==
Date	Opponent	Site	Result
November 8	Hamilton	Hamilton, NY	L 14–32
November 15	St. John's Military Academy	Hamilton, NY	W 14–6
