= 1890 Penn State football team =

American college football season

1890 Penn State football
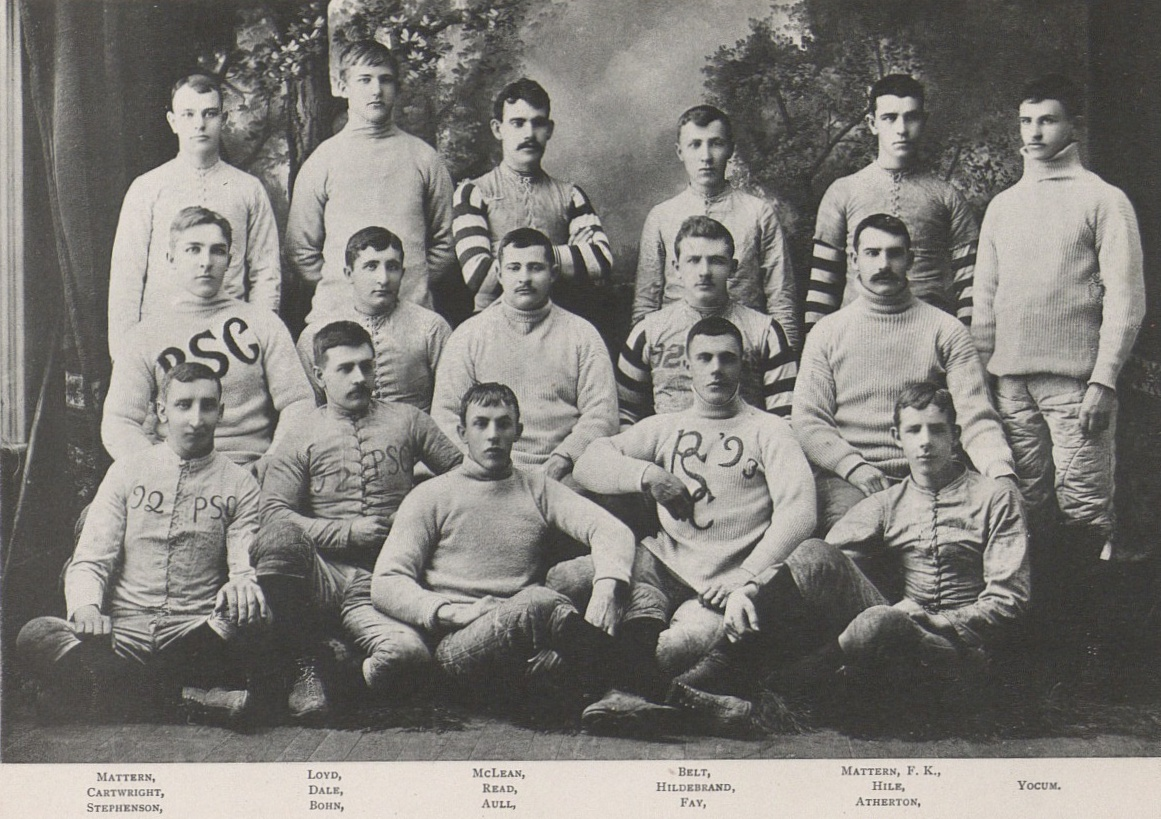
- Conference: Independent
- Record: 2–2
- Head coach: None
- Captain: Harvey McLean
- Home stadium: Old Main lawn

1890 Eastern college football independents records
	Conf.			Overall
Team	W	L	T	W		L		T
Harvard		–		11	–	0	–	0
Yale		–		13	–	1	–	0
Princeton		–		11	–	1	–	1
Franklin & Marshall		–		8	–	2	–	0
Navy		–		5	–	1	–	1
Penn		–		11	–	3	–	0
Washington & Jefferson		–		2	–	1	–	0
Cornell		–		7	–	4	–	0
Lehigh		–		7	–	4	–	0
Syracuse		–		7	–	4	–	0
Springfield YMCA		–		5	–	3	–	0
Rutgers		–		5	–	5	–	1
Penn State		–		2	–	2	–	0
Western Univ. Penn		–		2	–	2	–	0
Colgate		–		1	–	1	–	0
Wesleyan		–		5	–	6	–	0
Tufts		–		2	–	3	–	0
NYU		–		2	–	4	–	0
Lafayette		–		2	–	5	–	1
Fordham		–		1	–	3	–	1
Brown		–		2	–	5	–	0
Bucknell		–		1	–	4	–	1
Massachusetts		–		1	–	4	–	0
Columbia		–		1	–	6	–	1
Army		–		0	–	1	–	0
Geneva		–		0	–	1	–	0

The 1890 Penn State football team was an American football team that represented Pennsylvania State College—now known as Pennsylvania State University–as an independent during the 1890 college football season. The team played its home games on the Old Main lawn in University Park, Pennsylvania.

== Schedule ==
Date	Opponent	Site	Result	Attendance	Source
October 11	at Penn	Philadelphia, PA	L 0–20		
October 12	at Franklin & Marshall	McGrann's Park; Lancaster, PA	L 0–10	500	
November 15	Altoona Athletic Association	Old Main; State College, PA	W 68–0		
November 27	at Bellefonte Academy	Bellefonte, PA	W 23–0		
