= 1890 Columbia football team =

American college football season

1890 Columbia football
- Conference: Independent
- Record: 1–6–1
- Head coach: None
- Captain: A. C. Gildersleeve
- Home stadium: Brotherhood Park

1890 Eastern college football independents records
| | Conf. | | | Overall |
| Team | W | L | T | W | | L | | T |
|---|---|---|---|---|---|---|---|---|
| Harvard | | – | | 11 | – | 0 | – | 0 |
| Yale | | – | | 13 | – | 1 | – | 0 |
| Princeton | | – | | 11 | – | 1 | – | 1 |
| Franklin & Marshall | | – | | 8 | – | 2 | – | 0 |
| Navy | | – | | 5 | – | 1 | – | 1 |
| Penn | | – | | 11 | – | 3 | – | 0 |
| Washington & Jefferson | | – | | 2 | – | 1 | – | 0 |
| Cornell | | – | | 7 | – | 4 | – | 0 |
| Lehigh | | – | | 7 | – | 4 | – | 0 |
| Syracuse | | – | | 7 | – | 4 | – | 0 |
| Springfield YMCA | | – | | 5 | – | 3 | – | 0 |
| Rutgers | | – | | 5 | – | 5 | – | 1 |
| Penn State | | – | | 2 | – | 2 | – | 0 |
| Western Univ. Penn | | – | | 2 | – | 2 | – | 0 |
| Colgate | | – | | 1 | – | 1 | – | 0 |
| Wesleyan | | – | | 5 | – | 6 | – | 0 |
| Tufts | | – | | 2 | – | 3 | – | 0 |
| NYU | | – | | 2 | – | 4 | – | 0 |
| Lafayette | | – | | 2 | – | 5 | – | 1 |
| Fordham | | – | | 1 | – | 3 | – | 1 |
| Brown | | – | | 2 | – | 5 | – | 0 |
| Bucknell | | – | | 1 | – | 4 | – | 1 |
| Massachusetts | | – | | 1 | – | 4 | – | 0 |
| Columbia | | – | | 1 | – | 6 | – | 1 |
| Army | | – | | 0 | – | 1 | – | 0 |
| Geneva | | – | | 0 | – | 1 | – | 0 |

The 1890 Columbia football team was an American football team that represented Columbia University as an independent during the 1890 college football season. The team compiled a 1–6–1 record and was outscored by a total of 199 to 46. The team had no coach. A. C. Gildersleeve served as team captain. Columbia played home games at Brotherhood Park in Manhattan.

== Schedule ==
| Date | Time | Opponent | Site | Result | Attendance | Source |
|---|---|---|---|---|---|---|
| October 4 | | at Orange Athletic Club | Orange Oval; Orange, NJ | L 0–21 | | |
| October 18 | 3:00 p.m. | Wesleyan | Brotherhood Park; New York, NY | L 0–4 | | |
| October 22 | | Penn | Brotherhood Park; New York, NY | L 0–18 | | |
| October 30 | 3:30 p.m. | Fordham | Brotherhood Park; New York, NY (rivalry) | W 40–0 | | |
| November 1 | 3:30 p.m. | at Crescent Athletic Club | Crescent Club grounds; Brooklyn, NY | L 0–29 | | |
| November 4 | | Princeton | Berkeley Oval; New York, NY | L 0–85 | 1,000 | |
| November 15 | 4:10 p.m. | Rutgers | Brotherhood Park; New York, NY | T 6–6 | | |
| November 22 | | at Cornell | Percy Field; Ithaca, NY (rivalry) | L 0–36 | | |
