= 1890 Springfield YMCA football team =

American college football season

1890 Springfield YMCA football
- Conference: Independent
- Record: 5–3
- Head coach: Amos Alonzo Stagg (1st season)
- Captain: Amos Alonzo Stagg
- Home stadium: Springfield YMCA grounds Gunn's lot / State-street athletic grounds Armory hill athletic grounds Hampden Park

1890 Eastern college football independents records
	Conf.			Overall
Team	W	L	T	W		L		T
Harvard		–		11	–	0	–	0
Yale		–		13	–	1	–	0
Princeton		–		11	–	1	–	1
Franklin & Marshall		–		8	–	2	–	0
Navy		–		5	–	1	–	1
Penn		–		11	–	3	–	0
Washington & Jefferson		–		2	–	1	–	0
Cornell		–		7	–	4	–	0
Lehigh		–		7	–	4	–	0
Syracuse		–		7	–	4	–	0
Springfield YMCA		–		5	–	3	–	0
Rutgers		–		5	–	5	–	1
Penn State		–		2	–	2	–	0
Western Univ. Penn		–		2	–	2	–	0
Colgate		–		1	–	1	–	0
Wesleyan		–		5	–	6	–	0
Tufts		–		2	–	3	–	0
NYU		–		2	–	4	–	0
Lafayette		–		2	–	5	–	1
Fordham		–		1	–	3	–	1
Brown		–		2	–	5	–	0
Bucknell		–		1	–	4	–	1
Massachusetts		–		1	–	4	–	0
Columbia		–		1	–	6	–	1
Army		–		0	–	1	–	0
Geneva		–		0	–	1	–	0

The 1890 Springfield YMCA football team, also known as the Christian Workers and the Staggs, was an American football team that represented the International Young Men's Christian Association Training School—now known as Springfield College–as an independent during the 1890 college football season. Led by first-year head coach Amos Alonzo Stagg, the team compiled a record of 5–3. Springfield YMCA played home games at several locations in Springfield, Massachusetts.

== Schedule ==
Date	Time	Opponent	Site	Result	Attendance	Source
October 8	3:15 p.m.	Williston Seminary	Springfield YMCA grounds; Springfield, MA	L 10–15		
October 15	4:30 p.m.	at Williston Seminary	Seminary campus; Easthampton, MA	W 14–9		
October 18		at Massachusetts	Amherst, MA	W 14–10		
November 1	3:30 p.m.	Massachusetts	Gunn's lot / State-street athletic grounds; Springfield, MA	L 12–18		
		Connecticut Literary Institute		W 24–6		
November 19	3:30 p.m.	Yale freshmen	Armory-hill athletic grounds; Springfield, MA	W 38–0		
November 22		Amherst	Hampden Park; Springfield, PA	W 26–0	3,000	
December 12		vs. Yale '91 team	Madison Square Garden; New York, NY	L 10–16		
