= 1890 NYU Violets football team =

American college football season

1890 NYU Violets football
- Conference: Independent
- Record: 2–4

1890 Eastern college football independents records
	Conf.			Overall
Team	W	L	T	W		L		T
Harvard		–		11	–	0	–	0
Yale		–		13	–	1	–	0
Princeton		–		11	–	1	–	1
Franklin & Marshall		–		8	–	2	–	0
Navy		–		5	–	1	–	1
Penn		–		11	–	3	–	0
Washington & Jefferson		–		2	–	1	–	0
Cornell		–		7	–	4	–	0
Lehigh		–		7	–	4	–	0
Syracuse		–		7	–	4	–	0
Springfield YMCA		–		5	–	3	–	0
Rutgers		–		5	–	5	–	1
Penn State		–		2	–	2	–	0
Western Univ. Penn		–		2	–	2	–	0
Colgate		–		1	–	1	–	0
Wesleyan		–		5	–	6	–	0
Tufts		–		2	–	3	–	0
NYU		–		2	–	4	–	0
Lafayette		–		2	–	5	–	1
Fordham		–		1	–	3	–	1
Brown		–		2	–	5	–	0
Bucknell		–		1	–	4	–	1
Massachusetts		–		1	–	4	–	0
Columbia		–		1	–	6	–	1
Army		–		0	–	1	–	0
Geneva		–		0	–	1	–	0

The 1890 NYU Violets football team was an American football team that represented New York University (NYU) as an independent during the 1890 college football season. The Violets compiled an 2–4 record.

== Schedule ==
Date	Opponent	Site	Result	Attendance	Source
October 4	at Montclair Athletic Club	Montclair, NJ	L 0–12		
October 15	at Berkeley School	Berkeley Oval; Bronx, NY	W 34–6		
October 25	vs. CCNY	Berkeley Oval; Bronx, NY	W 16–0	400	
November 1	at Montclair Athletic Club	Montclair, NJ	L 4–14		
November 4	at Fordham	New York, NY	L 0–31		
November 14	at Rutgers	New Brunswick, NJ	L 0–62		
