= 1890 Yale Bulldogs football team =

American college football season

1890 Yale Bulldogs football
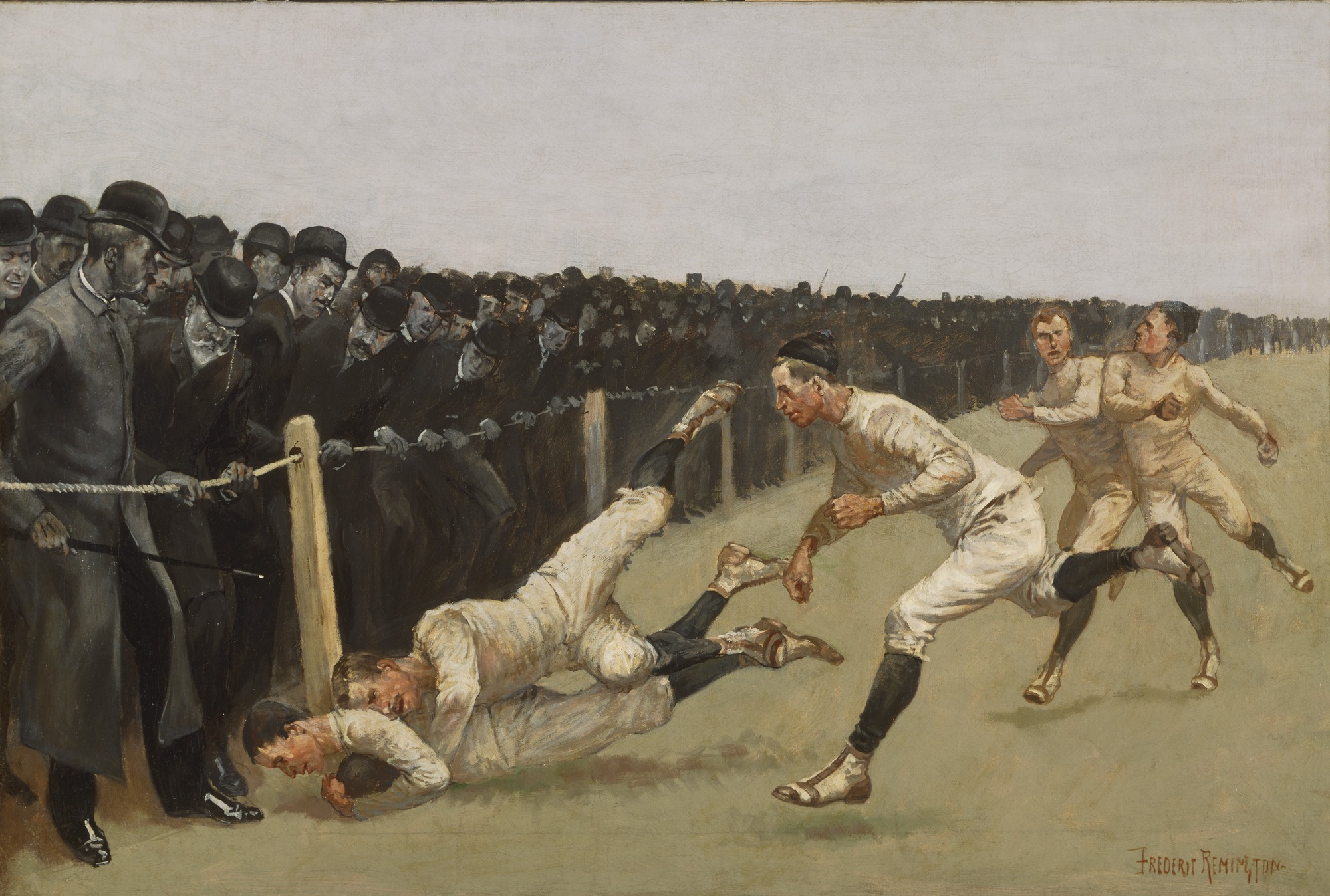
- Touchdown, 1890 Yale vs. Princeton game, painting by Frederic Remington
- Conference: Independent
- Record: 13–1
- Head coach: Walter Camp (3rd season)
- Captain: William Rhodes
- Home stadium: Yale Field

1890 Eastern college football independents records
	Conf.			Overall
Team	W	L	T	W		L		T
Harvard		–		11	–	0	–	0
Yale		–		13	–	1	–	0
Princeton		–		11	–	1	–	1
Franklin & Marshall		–		8	–	2	–	0
Navy		–		5	–	1	–	1
Penn		–		11	–	3	–	0
Washington & Jefferson		–		2	–	1	–	0
Cornell		–		7	–	4	–	0
Lehigh		–		7	–	4	–	0
Syracuse		–		7	–	4	–	0
Springfield YMCA		–		5	–	3	–	0
Rutgers		–		5	–	5	–	1
Penn State		–		2	–	2	–	0
Western Univ. Penn		–		2	–	2	–	0
Colgate		–		1	–	1	–	0
Wesleyan		–		5	–	6	–	0
Tufts		–		2	–	3	–	0
NYU		–		2	–	4	–	0
Lafayette		–		2	–	5	–	1
Fordham		–		1	–	3	–	1
Brown		–		2	–	5	–	0
Bucknell		–		1	–	4	–	1
Massachusetts		–		1	–	4	–	0
Columbia		–		1	–	6	–	1
Army		–		0	–	1	–	0
Geneva		–		0	–	1	–	0

The 1890 Yale Bulldogs football team represented Yale University in the 1890 college football season. In its third year under head coach Walter Camp, the team compiled a 13–1 record, recorded 12 shutouts, and outscored all opponents by a total of 484 to 18. Its only loss was to rival Harvard by a 12–6 score.

Three Yale players (halfback Thomas McClung, guard Pudge Heffelfinger, and tackle William Rhodes) were consensus picks for the 1890 College Football All-America Team. All three have also been inducted into the College Football Hall of Fame

== Schedule ==
Date	Time	Opponent	Site	Result	Attendance	Source
October 1		Wesleyan	Yale Field; New Haven, CT	W 8–0		
October 4		at Crescent Athletic Club	Washington Park; Brooklyn, NY	W 18–6	4,000	
October 8		at Wesleyan	Middletown, CT	W 34–0		
October 11		Lehigh	Yale Field; New Haven, CT	W 26–0		
October 15		at Trinity (CT)	Hartford, CT	W 40–0	500	
October 18		at Orange Athletic Club	Orange Oval; Orange, NJ	W 16–0		
October 22		Williams	Yale Field; New Haven, CT	W 36–0		
October 25	4:25 p.m.	at Amherst	Blake Field; Amherst, MA	W 10–0		
November 1		Wesleyan	Yale Field; New Haven, CT	W 76–0		
November 4		at Crescent Athletic Club	Washington Park; Brooklyn, NY	W 52–0	8,000	
November 8		Rutgers	Yale Field; New Haven, CT	W 70–0		
November 15		Penn	Yale Field; New Haven, CT	W 60–0		
November 22	2:30 p.m.	vs. Harvard	Hampden Park; Springfield, MA (rivalry)	L 6–12	15,000–17,000	
November 27		vs. Princeton	Eastern Park; Brooklyn, NY (rivalry)	W 32–0	10,000	

== Roster ==
- William Adams, G
- Frank Barbour, QB
- Hugh Aiken Bayne, E
- Laurie Bliss, HB
- Ben Crosby, E
- Frank H. Funk, T
- John A. Hartwell, E
- Perry W. Harvey, FB
- Pudge Heffelfinger, G
- Harry C. Holcomb, C
- William M. Lewis, C
- Thomas McClung, HB
- Charles W. Mills, G
- B. Morrison, HB
- Stanford N. Morrison, G
- Adelbert L. Reynolds
- William Rhodes, T
- Erman J. Ridgway, E
- Alexander Hamilton Wallis, T
- Henry L. Williams, HB
