= 1890 Williams Ephs football team =

American college football season

1890 Williams Ephs football

EIFA champion
- Conference: Eastern Intercollegiate Football Association
- Record: 8–2 (4–0 EIFA)
- Head coach: None
- Captain: Brown
- Home stadium: Weston Field

1890 Eastern Intercollegiate Football Association standings
	Conf.					Overall
Team	W		L		T	W		L		T
Williams $	4	–	0	–	0	8	–	2	–	0
Amherst	3	–	1	–	0	7	–	6	–	1
Dartmouth	1	–	2	–	0	4	–	4	–	0
Boston Tech	0	–	2	–	0	4	–	4	–	1
Bowdoin	0	–	3	–	0	4	–	4	–	0
$ – Conference champion

The 1890 Williams Ephs football team represented the Williams College as a member of the Eastern Intercollegiate Football Association (EIFA) during the 1890 college football season. Williams compiled an overall record of 8–2 with a mark of 4–0 in conference play, winning the EIFA title. The team played home games at Weston Field in Williamstown, Massachusetts.

== Schedule ==
Date	Time	Opponent	Site	Result	Attendance	Source
October 11		at Ridgefield Athletic Association*	Ridgefield grounds; Albany, NY	W 46–0		
October 15		Laureate Boat Club*	Williamstown, MA	W 142–0		
October 18		at Harvard*	Jarvis Field; Cambridge, MA	L 0–38		
October 22		at Yale*	Yale Field; New Haven, CT	L 0–36		
October 25	1:15 p.m.	Trinity (CT)*	Weston Field; Williamstown, MA	W 28–0		
October 31		Cornell*	Weston Field; Williamstown, MA	W 18–8		
November 5	2:30 p.m.	vs. Bowdoin	Deering ball grounds; Portland, ME	W 50–0	800	
November 8	2:30 p.m.	at Boston Tech	South End Grounds; Boston, MA	W 36–0		
November 15	2:16 p.m.	Amherst	Weston Field; Williamstown, MA (rivalry)	W 6–0		
November 21	2:20 p.m.	Dartmouth	Weston Field; Williamstown, MA	W 6–0		
*Non-conference game
