= 1890 Western University of Pennsylvania football team =

American college football season

1890 Western University of Pennsylvania football
- Conference: Independent
- Record: 2–2
- Head coach: None
- Captain: John Scott

1890 Eastern college football independents records
	Conf.			Overall
Team	W	L	T	W		L		T
Harvard		–		11	–	0	–	0
Yale		–		13	–	1	–	0
Princeton		–		11	–	1	–	1
Franklin & Marshall		–		8	–	2	–	0
Navy		–		5	–	1	–	1
Penn		–		11	–	3	–	0
Washington & Jefferson		–		2	–	1	–	0
Cornell		–		7	–	4	–	0
Lehigh		–		7	–	4	–	0
Syracuse		–		7	–	4	–	0
Springfield YMCA		–		5	–	3	–	0
Rutgers		–		5	–	5	–	1
Penn State		–		2	–	2	–	0
Western Univ. Penn		–		2	–	2	–	0
Colgate		–		1	–	1	–	0
Wesleyan		–		5	–	6	–	0
Tufts		–		2	–	3	–	0
NYU		–		2	–	4	–	0
Lafayette		–		2	–	5	–	1
Fordham		–		1	–	3	–	1
Brown		–		2	–	5	–	0
Bucknell		–		1	–	4	–	1
Massachusetts		–		1	–	4	–	0
Columbia		–		1	–	6	–	1
Army		–		0	–	1	–	0
Geneva		–		0	–	1	–	0

The 1890 Western University of Pennsylvania football team was an American football team represented Western University of Pennsylvania—now known as the University of Pittsburgh—as an independent during the 1890 college football season.

== Schedule ==
Date	Opponent	Site	Result	Source
October 11	Allegheny Athletic Association	Exposition Park; Allegheny, PA	L 0–38	
November 1	at Washington & Jefferson	College Park; Washington, PA	L 0–32	
November 15	at Kiskiminetas	Saltsburg, PA	W 12–10	
November 22	at Geneva	Beaver Falls, PA	W 10–4	

== Season recap ==
Thanks to the initiative of Bert Smyers and John Scott, the Western University of Pennsylvania Athletic Association met during the 1889–90 school year and elected committees for the sports of baseball and football. Smyers and Scott organized a football team that fall and played one game, which they lost to Shadyside Academy. The lineup "in addition to Scott, captain and center, and Smyers, quarterback, included Anson B. McGrew and Frank Rhea at guards, Harry S. Calvert and John McGrew at tackles, E. C. Shaler and George H. Calvert at ends, Joseph B. Griggs and William C. Gill at halfbacks, and John M. Hansen at fullback."

During the second meeting a tennis committee was added to the association. An initiation fee for the student population was set at fifty cents for the school year or twenty-five cents for the semester.

The student publication, The University Courant, reported strong interest in football with prospective players training in the university's gymnasium. By the fall of 1890, the school had a football team ready to compete. The first varsity football team of the Western University of Pennsylvania (WUP) compiled a 2–2 record and was outscored by a total of 74 to 22.

The starting lineup for the 1890 season was John Scott (center/captain), John McGrew (left guard), Anson McGrew (right guard), Harry Calvert (tackle), James Price (right tackle), John Murray (left end), William Dorrington (right end), Bert Smyers (quarterback), Joseph Griggs (left halfback), Alfred Hamilton (right halfback), and Frank Rhea (fullback). Charles Zug, John Stephenson, John Hansen and Lorens Robbins were the substitutes.

== Game summaries ==
=== Allegheny Athletic Association ===
WUP at Allegheny AA

Team	1	2	Total
WUP	0	0	0
• Allegheny AA	20	18	38

- Date: October 11, 1890
- Location: Exposition Park, Pittsburgh
- Game attendance: 500
- Referee: A. Macpherson

Initially, the 1890 Western University of Pennsylvania had a three-game schedule. On Saturday October 11, the team assembled at Exposition Park to play the Allegheny Athletic Association team due to a cancellation by the Shadyside Academy eleven. The Pittsburgh Press recapped the game rather succinctly:

"The Western University Boys Completely Overwhelmed - About 500 people witnessed the football game and athletic sports at Exposition Park yesterday afternoon. The Western University eleven was substituted for the Shady Side Academy gang but the collegians were not in it with the Allegheny Athletic association gang, who won by a score of 38 to 0".

The Pittsburgh Dispatch had a more detailed account. The weather was unpleasant and so there was not much of a crowd. O. D. Thompson scored the first touchdown for the Allegheny eleven. Robinson kicked the goal after and WUP was down 6–0. AA teammates Thompson, Robinson and Wilkinson each scored another first half touchdown and Fry converted a goal kick after to account for the 20–0 halftime lead. The Allegheny eleven tacked on eighteen more second half points to reach the 38–0 final score. The following Thursday, the team received their uniforms from Pratt's Sporting Goods.

=== At Washington & Jefferson ===
For their next game, the WUPs traveled to Washington, Pennsylvania to take on Washington & Jefferson. The WUPs were again defeated handily 32–0. The Pittsburgh Press again recapped the game with a short paragraph:

"In a game between the Western University eleven and the Washington and Jefferson eleven this afternoon the Washington boys were victorious by the score of 32 to 0. Quite a kick was occasioned by the Washington and Jefferson eleven putting their trainer, Lynch, in the field. The University boys objected to this, and for a while it looked as if no game would be played. Eventually Lynch was withdrawn just as the Pittsburg boys were leaving the grounds".

=== At Kiskiminetas School ===
The second road game of the season was to Saltsburg, Pa. to play the team representing the Kiskiminetas School. The WUP eleven prevailed in a hard-fought scrimmage and won their first game 12–10.

=== At Geneva ===
WUP at Geneva

Team	1	2	Total
• WUP	6	4	10
Geneva	4	0	4

- Date: November 22, 1890
- Location: Geneva Grounds·Beaver Falls, PA

For the final game of their first season of football, the WUPs traveled to Beaver Falls to take on the Covies of Geneva College. The WUPs, who were outweighed by twenty pounds per man, defeated Geneva for their second victory. The Pittsburgh Press summarized the action:

"The football game between the Western University eleven and the Geneva college team at Beaver Falls yesterday resulted in a score of 10 to 4 in favor of the University boys. In the first half a bad pass gave the ball to Reed, who succeeded in making a touchdown, scoring the only point for the Geneva team. A touchdown by Calvert and a place kick by Griggs gave the University eleven six points. A vigorous push put the ball over the line again bringing the University score up to 10. Although the Geneva boys averaged about 20 pounds more than the University eleven, yet the latter managed to push them all over the field".

== Roster ==
The roster of the 1890 Western University of Pennsylvania football team:

- John Scott (center and captain) graduated with a degree in philosophy in 1891 and lived in New York City.
- Bertrand H. Smyers (quarterback) co-founded the team with John Scott. He graduated with a Bachelor of Arts degree in 1893. In 1917 he was the vice president of the Pittsburgh Trust Company, treasurer of the University of Pittsburgh General Alumni Association and member of the Athletic Council.
- Harry S. Calvert (left tackle) received his Bachelor of Arts degree in 1893 and his Master of Arts in 1895. He became the president of Elyria Enameled Products Company and was very active in alumni organizations. He resided in Pittsburgh.
- William M. Dorrington (right end) graduated with a degree in Engineering in 1894 and lived in Pittsburgh.
- Dr. Joseph F. Griggs Jr. (left halfback) received his Bachelor of Arts in 1892 and his Masters of Arts in 1895 and lived in Tacoma, Washington. He received the Chancellor's Prize in English Literature in his sophomore year (1890). He later became a physician whose career included the charge of a Presbyterian hospital in Peking, China.
- Alfred R. Hamilton (right halfback) received his engineering degree in 1894 followed by a Bachelor of Science in Economics in 1911. He resided in Pittsburgh.
- Anson B. McGrew (right guard) graduated with a degree in Civil Engineering in 1892 and became an Assistant Engineer for the U.S. Government Corps in Beaver, Pennsylvania.
- John McGrew (left guard) received his degree in civil engineering in 1891 and lived in Grafton, Pennsylvania.
- John P. Murray (left end) received his associate degree from the college in 1894 and lived in Cienfuegos, Cuba.
- Frank Rhea (fullback) earned his degree in civil engineering in 1892 and worked for the Interstate Commerce Commission in Washington, D.C.
- James B. Price (right tackle) received his civil engineering degree in 1894.
- John G. Stephenson Jr. (substitute) received his associate degree from the college in 1893 and lived in Pittsburgh.
- John M. Hansen (substitute) received his associate degree from the college in 1893 and lived in Pittsburgh.
- Charles C. Zug (substitute) received his associate degree from the college in 1893.
- Lorens L. Robbins (substitute) received his associate degree from the college in 1893.
