= 1890 Syracuse Orangemen football team =

American college football season

1890 Syracuse Orangemen football
- Conference: Independent
- Record: 7–4
- Head coach: Robert Winston (1st season)
- Captain: John Blake Hillyer
- Home stadium: Star Park

1890 Eastern college football independents records
	Conf.			Overall
Team	W	L	T	W		L		T
Harvard		–		11	–	0	–	0
Yale		–		13	–	1	–	0
Princeton		–		11	–	1	–	1
Franklin & Marshall		–		8	–	2	–	0
Navy		–		5	–	1	–	1
Penn		–		11	–	3	–	0
Washington & Jefferson		–		2	–	1	–	0
Cornell		–		7	–	4	–	0
Lehigh		–		7	–	4	–	0
Syracuse		–		7	–	4	–	0
Springfield YMCA		–		5	–	3	–	0
Rutgers		–		5	–	5	–	1
Penn State		–		2	–	2	–	0
Western Univ. Penn		–		2	–	2	–	0
Colgate		–		1	–	1	–	0
Wesleyan		–		5	–	6	–	0
Tufts		–		2	–	3	–	0
NYU		–		2	–	4	–	0
Lafayette		–		2	–	5	–	1
Fordham		–		1	–	3	–	1
Brown		–		2	–	5	–	0
Bucknell		–		1	–	4	–	1
Massachusetts		–		1	–	4	–	0
Columbia		–		1	–	6	–	1
Army		–		0	–	1	–	0
Geneva		–		0	–	1	–	0

The 1890 Syracuse Orangemen football team was an American football team that represented Syracuse University as an independent during the 1890 college football season. In their first season under head coach Robert Winston, the Orangemen compiled a 7–4 record.

== Previous season ==
Syracuse Chancellor Charles N. Sims wanted the athletic program at SU to be as competitive as those at Yale and Harvard. To achieve this goal, he encouraged the development of a more challenging academic program and a healthier campus environment. However, the necessary infrastructure was already in place for team captain John Blake Hillyer to form a football team. In October 1889, Hillyer created the University Athletic Association, a student-run organization that managed the finances and logistics for various sports and the football program at Syracuse was now officially recognized. Syracuse played its first football game on November 23, 1889, recording a 36–0 loss to Rochester.

Hillyer returned the next year with Robert "Bobby" Winston as the head coach. Winston, who became the first head coach of Syracuse football, was paid $35 per month (plus expenses).

== Schedule ==
Date	Opponent	Site	Result	Attendance	Source
September 26	Syracuse Athletic Association	Syracuse, NY	W 14–0		
October 2	Syracuse Athletic Association	Syracuse, NY	W 32–0		
October 18	St. John's Military Academy	Syracuse, NY	W 26–6		
October 27	Union (NY)	Star Park; Syracuse, NY	L 0–26	400	
November 1	Hamilton	Syracuse, NY	W 14–12	600	
November 8	at Union (NY)	Schenectady, NY	L 0–28		
November 15	at Rochester	Rochester, NY	W 4–0	500	
November 22	Rochester	Star Park; Syracuse, NY	L 0–2	300	
November 25	at Hamilton	Clinton, NY	L 4–6		
November 27	Syracuse Athletic Association	Syracuse, NY	W 16–14		
November 29	St. John's Military Academy	Syracuse, NY	W 18–4		
