= 1890 Lafayette football team =

American college football season

1890 Lafayette football
- Conference: Independent
- Record: 2–5–1
- Head coach: None
- Captain: Joseph Fox
- Home stadium: The Quad

1890 Eastern college football independents records
	Conf.			Overall
Team	W	L	T	W		L		T
Harvard		–		11	–	0	–	0
Yale		–		13	–	1	–	0
Princeton		–		11	–	1	–	1
Franklin & Marshall		–		8	–	2	–	0
Navy		–		5	–	1	–	1
Penn		–		11	–	3	–	0
Washington & Jefferson		–		2	–	1	–	0
Cornell		–		7	–	4	–	0
Lehigh		–		7	–	4	–	0
Syracuse		–		7	–	4	–	0
Springfield YMCA		–		5	–	3	–	0
Rutgers		–		5	–	5	–	1
Penn State		–		2	–	2	–	0
Western Univ. Penn		–		2	–	2	–	0
Colgate		–		1	–	1	–	0
Wesleyan		–		5	–	6	–	0
Tufts		–		2	–	3	–	0
NYU		–		2	–	4	–	0
Lafayette		–		2	–	5	–	1
Fordham		–		1	–	3	–	1
Brown		–		2	–	5	–	0
Bucknell		–		1	–	4	–	1
Massachusetts		–		1	–	4	–	0
Columbia		–		1	–	6	–	1
Army		–		0	–	1	–	0
Geneva		–		0	–	1	–	0

The 1890 Lafayette football team was an American football team that represented Lafayette College as an independent during the 1890 college football season. Playing without a regular coach, the team compiled a 2–5–1 record and was outscored by a total of 166 to 100. Joseph Fox was the team captain, and G. Harvey was the manager. The team played its home games on The Quad in Easton, Pennsylvania.

== Schedule ==
Date	Time	Opponent	Site	Result	Attendance	Source
October 1		Dickinson	The Quad; Easton, PA	W 54–0		
October 4		Bucknell	The Quad; Easton, PA	T 0–0		
October 11		at Franklin & Marshall	McGrann's Park; Lancaster, PA	L 10–18	> 1,200	
October 22		at Princeton	University Field; Princeton, NJ	L 6–26		
November 1		Lehigh	The Quad; Easton, PA (rivalry)	L 0–30		
November 15		at Lehigh	Bethlehem, PA	L 6–60		
November 21	3:30 p.m.	at Virginia	Madison Hall Field; Charlottesville, VA	L 14–20		
November 22		at Columbia Athletic Club	Capitol Park; Washington, DC	W 20–6		
