= 1890 Penn Quakers football team =

American college football season

1890 Penn Quakers football
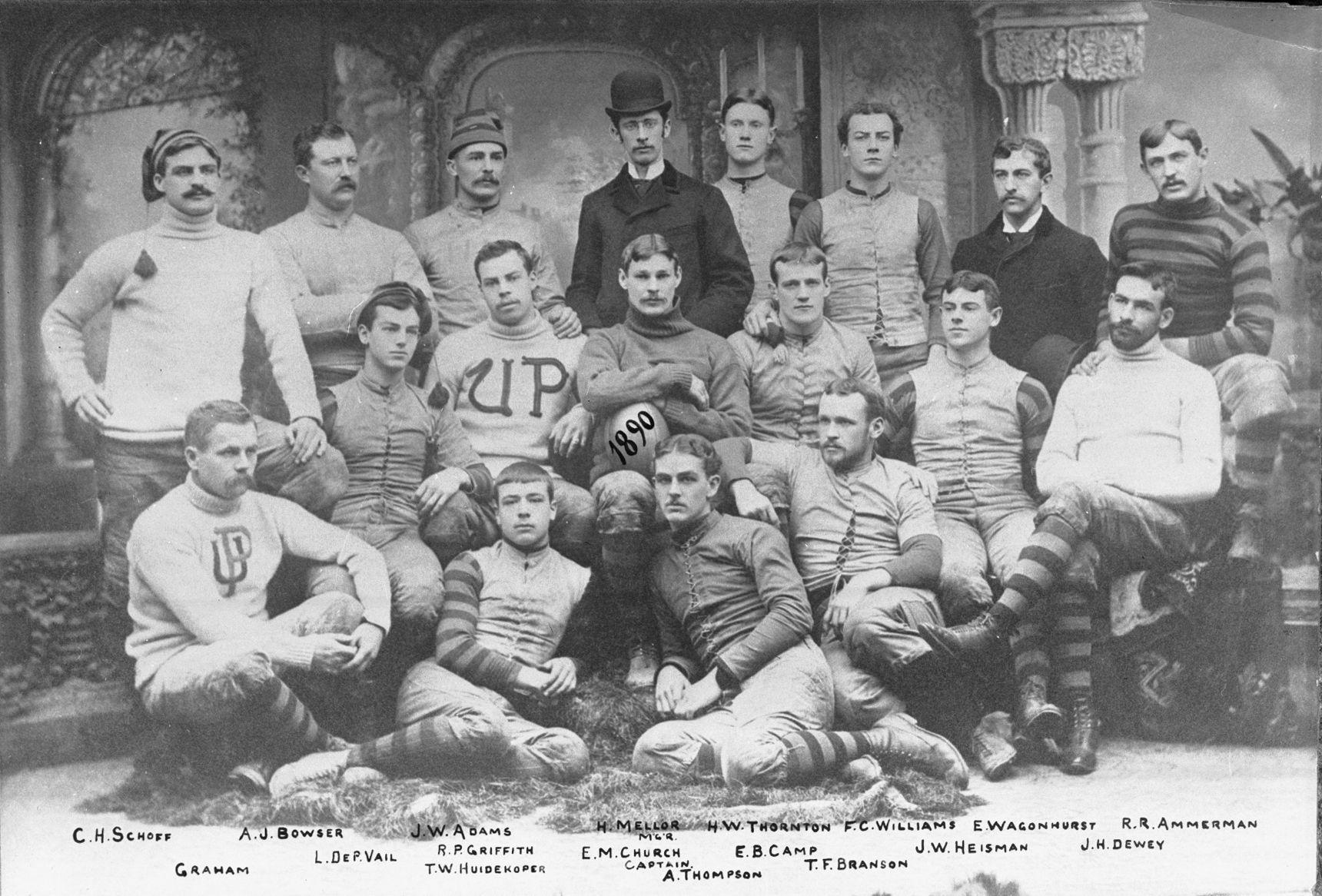
- Conference: Independent
- Record: 11–3
- Head coach: Woody Wagenhorst (3rd season)
- Captain: Edgar M. Church
- Home stadium: University Athletic Grounds

1890 Eastern college football independents records
	Conf.			Overall
Team	W	L	T	W		L		T
Harvard		–		11	–	0	–	0
Yale		–		13	–	1	–	0
Princeton		–		11	–	1	–	1
Franklin & Marshall		–		8	–	2	–	0
Navy		–		5	–	1	–	1
Penn		–		11	–	3	–	0
Washington & Jefferson		–		2	–	1	–	0
Cornell		–		7	–	4	–	0
Lehigh		–		7	–	4	–	0
Syracuse		–		7	–	4	–	0
Springfield YMCA		–		5	–	3	–	0
Rutgers		–		5	–	5	–	1
Penn State		–		2	–	2	–	0
Western Univ. Penn		–		2	–	2	–	0
Colgate		–		1	–	1	–	0
Wesleyan		–		5	–	6	–	0
Tufts		–		2	–	3	–	0
NYU		–		2	–	4	–	0
Lafayette		–		2	–	5	–	1
Fordham		–		1	–	3	–	1
Brown		–		2	–	5	–	0
Bucknell		–		1	–	4	–	1
Massachusetts		–		1	–	4	–	0
Columbia		–		1	–	6	–	1
Army		–		0	–	1	–	0
Geneva		–		0	–	1	–	0

The 1890 Penn Quakers football team represented the University of Pennsylvania in the 1890 college football season. The Quakers finished with an 11–3 record in their third year under head coach E. O. Wagenhorst. Significant games included victories over Rutgers (16–4 and 20–12), Penn State (20–0), and Lehigh (8–0 and 17–14), and losses to Princeton (6–0) and Yale (60–0). The 1890 Penn team outscored its opponents by a combined total of 259 to 134. No Penn players were honored on the 1890 College Football All-America Team.

== Schedule ==
Date	Opponent	Site	Result	Attendance	Source
October 1	at Swarthmore	Whittier Field; Swarthmore, PA	W 10–0		
October 4	Rutgers	University Athletic Grounds; Philadelphia, PA	W 16–4		
October 11	Penn State	Philadelphia, PA	W 20–0		
October 15	at Princeton	University Field; Princeton, NJ (rivalry)	L 0–18	600	
October 18	Lehigh	University Athletic Grounds; Philadelphia, PA	W 8–0	2,500	
October 22	at Columbia	Brotherhood Park; New York, NY	W 18–0		
October 25	Franklin & Marshall	University Athletic Grounds; Philadelphia PA	W 28–0		
October 31	vs. Virginia	Capitol Park; Washington, DC	W 72–0	> 1,000	
November 5	Schuylkill Navy	University Athletic Grounds; Philadelphia, PA	W 34–10		
November 8	Princeton	University Athletic Grounds; Philadelphia, PA	L 0–6	10,000	
November 15	at Yale	Yale Field; New Haven, CT	L 0–60		
November 22	at Lehigh	Bethlehem, PA	W 17–14		
November 26	vs. Wesleyan	Washington Park; New York, NY	W 16–10	3,000	
December 13	vs. Rutgers	Madison Square Garden; New York, NY	W 20–12	4,000–5,000	
