= 1890 Princeton Tigers football team =

American college football season

1890 Princeton Tigers football
- Conference: Independent
- Record: 11–1–1
- Head coach: None
- Captain: Edgar Allan Poe
- Home stadium: University Field

1890 Eastern college football independents records
	Conf.			Overall
Team	W	L	T	W		L		T
Harvard		–		11	–	0	–	0
Yale		–		13	–	1	–	0
Princeton		–		11	–	1	–	1
Franklin & Marshall		–		8	–	2	–	0
Navy		–		5	–	1	–	1
Penn		–		11	–	3	–	0
Washington & Jefferson		–		2	–	1	–	0
Cornell		–		7	–	4	–	0
Lehigh		–		7	–	4	–	0
Syracuse		–		7	–	4	–	0
Springfield YMCA		–		5	–	3	–	0
Rutgers		–		5	–	5	–	1
Penn State		–		2	–	2	–	0
Western Univ. Penn		–		2	–	2	–	0
Colgate		–		1	–	1	–	0
Wesleyan		–		5	–	6	–	0
Tufts		–		2	–	3	–	0
NYU		–		2	–	4	–	0
Lafayette		–		2	–	5	–	1
Fordham		–		1	–	3	–	1
Brown		–		2	–	5	–	0
Bucknell		–		1	–	4	–	1
Massachusetts		–		1	–	4	–	0
Columbia		–		1	–	6	–	1
Army		–		0	–	1	–	0
Geneva		–		0	–	1	–	0

The 1890 Princeton Tigers football team represented Princeton University in the 1890 college football season. The team finished with an 11–1–1 record. The Tigers recorded nine shutouts and outscored opponents by a combined total of 478 to 58. The team's only loss was by a 32–0 score against Yale and they tied the Orange Athletic Club 0–0.

Three Princeton players, fullback Sheppard Homans, Jr., end Ralph Warren, and guard Jesse Riggs, were consensus first-team honorees on the 1890 College Football All-America Team. In 1952, Grantland Rice paid tribute to Homans as the embodiment of the rough and tumble days of iron man football. Rice wrote: "Just as Ty Cobb represents the ball game of many years ago, this man represented the football that used to be."

The 115–0 defeat of Virginia is often marked as the beginning of major college football's arrival in the South.

== Schedule ==
Date	Opponent	Site	Result	Attendance	Source
October 4	Franklin & Marshall	University Field; Princeton, NJ	W 33–16		
October 8	Rutgers	University Field; Princeton, NJ (rivalry)	W 27–0	300	
October 11	at Orange Athletic Club	Tuxedo Park, NY	T 0–0	500	
October 15	Penn	University Field; Princeton, NJ (rivalry)	W 18–0	600	
October 18	at Crescent Athletic Club	Washington Park; Brooklyn, NY	W 12–0	3,000	
October 22	Lafayette	University Field; Princeton, NJ	W 26–6	300	
October 25	Lehigh	University Field; Princeton, NJ	W 50–0		
October 31	at Columbia Athletic Club	Analostan Island; Washington, DC	W 60–0	300–400	
November 1	vs. Virginia	Oriole Park; Baltimore, MD	W 115–0		
November 4	at Columbia	Berkeley Oval; New York, NY	W 85–0	1,000	
November 8	at Penn	University Athletic Grounds; Philadelphia, PA	W 6–0	10,000	
November 15	vs. Wesleyan	Eastern Park; Brooklyn, NY	W 46–4	500	
November 27	vs. Yale	Eastern Park; Brooklyn, NY (rivalry)	L 0–32	10,000	

== Roster ==
- Adams, HB
- Barnes
- Black, T
- Bonner, QB
- Edwin A. Dalton, HB
- Parke H. Davis, E
- Furness, E
- Gallway, T
- Hayden, E
- Sheppard Homans, Jr., FB
- Jefferson, G
- Jones, C
- Philip King, HB
- Lewis, G
- Edgar Allan Poe, QB
- Jesse Riggs, G
- Robert Elliott Speer, T
- William C. Spicer, HB
- Symmes
- Thomas, G
- Ralph Warren, E
- Clinton Wood, T
