= 1890 Massachusetts Aggies football team =

American college football season

1890 Massachusetts Aggies football
- Conference: Independent
- Record: 1–4
- Head coach: None
- Home stadium: Alumni Field

1890 Eastern college football independents records
| | Conf. | | | Overall |
| Team | W | L | T | W | | L | | T |
|---|---|---|---|---|---|---|---|---|
| Harvard | | – | | 11 | – | 0 | – | 0 |
| Yale | | – | | 13 | – | 1 | – | 0 |
| Princeton | | – | | 11 | – | 1 | – | 1 |
| Franklin & Marshall | | – | | 8 | – | 2 | – | 0 |
| Navy | | – | | 5 | – | 1 | – | 1 |
| Penn | | – | | 11 | – | 3 | – | 0 |
| Washington & Jefferson | | – | | 2 | – | 1 | – | 0 |
| Cornell | | – | | 7 | – | 4 | – | 0 |
| Lehigh | | – | | 7 | – | 4 | – | 0 |
| Syracuse | | – | | 7 | – | 4 | – | 0 |
| Springfield YMCA | | – | | 5 | – | 3 | – | 0 |
| Rutgers | | – | | 5 | – | 5 | – | 1 |
| Penn State | | – | | 2 | – | 2 | – | 0 |
| Western Univ. Penn | | – | | 2 | – | 2 | – | 0 |
| Colgate | | – | | 1 | – | 1 | – | 0 |
| Wesleyan | | – | | 5 | – | 6 | – | 0 |
| Tufts | | – | | 2 | – | 3 | – | 0 |
| NYU | | – | | 2 | – | 4 | – | 0 |
| Lafayette | | – | | 2 | – | 5 | – | 1 |
| Fordham | | – | | 1 | – | 3 | – | 1 |
| Brown | | – | | 2 | – | 5 | – | 0 |
| Bucknell | | – | | 1 | – | 4 | – | 1 |
| Massachusetts | | – | | 1 | – | 4 | – | 0 |
| Columbia | | – | | 1 | – | 6 | – | 1 |
| Army | | – | | 0 | – | 1 | – | 0 |
| Geneva | | – | | 0 | – | 1 | – | 0 |

The 1890 Massachusetts Aggies football team represented Massachusetts Agricultural College in the 1890 college football season. The team played its home games at Alumni Field in Amherst, Massachusetts. Massachusetts finished the season with a record of 1–4.

== Schedule ==
| Date | Time | Opponent | Site | Result | Source |
|---|---|---|---|---|---|
| September 29 | | Trinity (CT) | Alumni Field; Amherst, MA | L 0–30 | |
| October 9 | 4:15 p.m. | at Amherst | Blake Field; Amherst, MA | L 0–52 | |
| October 18 | | Springfield YMCA | Alumni Field; Amherst, MA | L 10–14 | |
| October 25 | | at Vermont (club) | Burlington, VT | L 12–16 | |
| November 1 | 3:30 p.m. | at Springfield YMCA | Gunn's lot / State-street athletic grounds; Springfield, MA | W 18–12 | |
