= 1890 Rutgers Queensmen football team =

American college football season

1890 Rutgers Queensmen football
- Conference: Independent
- Record: 5–5–1
- Head coach: None
- Captain: James Bishop Jr.
- Home stadium: College Field

1890 Eastern college football independents records
	Conf.			Overall
Team	W	L	T	W		L		T
Harvard		–		11	–	0	–	0
Yale		–		13	–	1	–	0
Princeton		–		11	–	1	–	1
Franklin & Marshall		–		8	–	2	–	0
Navy		–		5	–	1	–	1
Penn		–		11	–	3	–	0
Washington & Jefferson		–		2	–	1	–	0
Cornell		–		7	–	4	–	0
Lehigh		–		7	–	4	–	0
Syracuse		–		7	–	4	–	0
Springfield YMCA		–		5	–	3	–	0
Rutgers		–		5	–	5	–	1
Penn State		–		2	–	2	–	0
Western Univ. Penn		–		2	–	2	–	0
Colgate		–		1	–	1	–	0
Wesleyan		–		5	–	6	–	0
Tufts		–		2	–	3	–	0
NYU		–		2	–	4	–	0
Lafayette		–		2	–	5	–	1
Fordham		–		1	–	3	–	1
Brown		–		2	–	5	–	0
Bucknell		–		1	–	4	–	1
Massachusetts		–		1	–	4	–	0
Columbia		–		1	–	6	–	1
Army		–		0	–	1	–	0
Geneva		–		0	–	1	–	0

The 1890 Rutgers Queensmen football team represented Rutgers University as an independent during the 1890 college football season. The Queensmen compiled a 5–5–1 record and outscored their opponents, 222 to 147. The team had no coach, and its captain for the second consecutive year was James Bishop, Jr.

== Schedule ==
Date	Time	Opponent	Site	Result	Attendance	Source
October 4		at Penn	University Athletic Grounds; Philadelphia, PA	L 4–16		
October 8		at Princeton	Princeton, NJ (rivalry)	L 0–27	300	
October 18		at New York Athletic Club	Polo Grounds; New York, NY	W 30–1		
October 25		Orange Athletic Club	New Brunswick, NJ	W 6–4		
November 1		Crescent Athletic Club	Washington Park; Brooklyn, NY	W 18–6	4,000	
November 3		at Yale	Yale Field; New Haven, CT	L 0–70		
November 4		Lehigh	New Brunswick, NJ	L 2–4		
November 14		NYU	New Brunswick, NJ	W 62–0		
November 15	4:10 p.m.	at Columbia	Brotherhood Park; New York, NY	T 6–6		
November 22		Manhattan Athletic Club	New Brunswick, NJ	W 32–0		
