= 1890 Geneva Covenanters football team =

American college football season

1890 Geneva Covenanters football
- Conference: Independent
- Record: 0–1
- Head coach: William McCracken (1st season)
- Captain: W. H. Coverdale

1890 Eastern college football independents records
| | Conf. | | | Overall |
| Team | W | L | T | W | | L | | T |
|---|---|---|---|---|---|---|---|---|
| Harvard | | – | | 11 | – | 0 | – | 0 |
| Yale | | – | | 13 | – | 1 | – | 0 |
| Princeton | | – | | 11 | – | 1 | – | 1 |
| Franklin & Marshall | | – | | 8 | – | 2 | – | 0 |
| Navy | | – | | 5 | – | 1 | – | 1 |
| Penn | | – | | 11 | – | 3 | – | 0 |
| Washington & Jefferson | | – | | 2 | – | 1 | – | 0 |
| Cornell | | – | | 7 | – | 4 | – | 0 |
| Lehigh | | – | | 7 | – | 4 | – | 0 |
| Syracuse | | – | | 7 | – | 4 | – | 0 |
| Springfield YMCA | | – | | 5 | – | 3 | – | 0 |
| Rutgers | | – | | 5 | – | 5 | – | 1 |
| Penn State | | – | | 2 | – | 2 | – | 0 |
| Western Univ. Penn | | – | | 2 | – | 2 | – | 0 |
| Colgate | | – | | 1 | – | 1 | – | 0 |
| Wesleyan | | – | | 5 | – | 6 | – | 0 |
| Tufts | | – | | 2 | – | 3 | – | 0 |
| NYU | | – | | 2 | – | 4 | – | 0 |
| Lafayette | | – | | 2 | – | 5 | – | 1 |
| Fordham | | – | | 1 | – | 3 | – | 1 |
| Brown | | – | | 2 | – | 5 | – | 0 |
| Bucknell | | – | | 1 | – | 4 | – | 1 |
| Massachusetts | | – | | 1 | – | 4 | – | 0 |
| Columbia | | – | | 1 | – | 6 | – | 1 |
| Army | | – | | 0 | – | 1 | – | 0 |
| Geneva | | – | | 0 | – | 1 | – | 0 |

The 1890 Geneva Covenanters football team was an American football team that represented Geneva College as an independent during the 1890 college football season.

Led by head coach William McCracken, the team played only one game, losing to the Western University of Pennsylvania (now known as the University of Pittsburgh) by a score of 10–4. The game, played Beaver Falls, Pennsylvania, was the first official football victory in Pittsburgh Panthers football history. The Pittsburgh Press summarized the action: "The football game between the Western University eleven and the Geneva college team at Beaver Falls yesterday resulted in a score of 10 to 4 in favor of the University boys. In the first half a bad pass gave the ball to Reed, who succeeded in making a touchdown, scoring the only point for the Geneva team. A touchdown by Calvert and a place kick by Griggs gave the University eleven six points. A vigorous push put the ball over the line again bringing the University score up to 10. Although the Geneva boys averaged about 20 pounds more than the University eleven, yet the latter managed to push them all over the field".

The team's captain was W. H. Coverdale.

== Schedule ==
| Date | Opponent | Site | Result |
|---|---|---|---|
| November 22 | Western University of Pennsylvania | Beaver Falls, PA | L 4–10 |
