= 1890 New York Athletic Club football team =

American college football season

1890 New York Athletic Club football
- Conference: American Football Union
- Record: 1–5 (0–4 AFU)
- Captain: C. T. Schlesinger
- Home stadium: Polo Grounds

1890 American Football Union standings
	Conf.					Overall
Team	W		L		T	W		L		T
Crescent Athletic Club $	3	–	1	–	0	6	–	4	–	0
Orange Athletic Club	3	–	1	–	0	5	–	4	–	1
New York Athletic Club	0	–	4	–	0	1	–	5	–	0

The 1890 New York Athletic Club football team was an American club football team that represented the New York Athletic Club in the American Football Union (AFU) during the 1890 football season. The New York team played their home games at the Polo Grounds in Manhattan.

== Schedule ==
Date	Time	Opponent	Site	Result	Attendance	Source
October 25	3:00 p.m.	Crescent Athletic Club	Polo Grounds; New York, NY	L 0–36	300	
November 1		Orange Athletic Club	Polo Grounds; New York, NY	L 0–6		
November 8		Staten Island Athletic Club	Staten Island Athletic Club grounds; Staten Island, NY	W (forfeit)		
November 15		at Crescent Athletic Club	Washington Park; Brooklyn, NY	L 8–40		
November 22		at Orange Athletic Club	Orange Oval; Orange, NJ	L 0–28	500	
November 26		Manhattan Athletic Club	Polo Grounds; New York, NY	L 6–16 or 14		
