= 1890 Washington & Jefferson football team =

American college football season

1890 Washington & Jefferson football
- Conference: Independent
- Record: 2–1
- Head coach: R. LeBlanc Lynch (1st season)
- Home stadium: College Park

1890 Eastern college football independents records
	Conf.			Overall
Team	W	L	T	W		L		T
Harvard		–		11	–	0	–	0
Yale		–		13	–	1	–	0
Princeton		–		11	–	1	–	1
Franklin & Marshall		–		8	–	2	–	0
Navy		–		5	–	1	–	1
Penn		–		11	–	3	–	0
Washington & Jefferson		–		2	–	1	–	0
Cornell		–		7	–	4	–	0
Lehigh		–		7	–	4	–	0
Syracuse		–		7	–	4	–	0
Springfield YMCA		–		5	–	3	–	0
Rutgers		–		5	–	5	–	1
Penn State		–		2	–	2	–	0
Western Univ. Penn		–		2	–	2	–	0
Colgate		–		1	–	1	–	0
Wesleyan		–		5	–	6	–	0
Tufts		–		2	–	3	–	0
NYU		–		2	–	4	–	0
Lafayette		–		2	–	5	–	1
Fordham		–		1	–	3	–	1
Brown		–		2	–	5	–	0
Bucknell		–		1	–	4	–	1
Massachusetts		–		1	–	4	–	0
Columbia		–		1	–	6	–	1
Army		–		0	–	1	–	0
Geneva		–		0	–	1	–	0

The 1890 Washington & Jefferson football team was an American football team that represented Washington & Jefferson College during the 1890 college football season. The team compiled a 2–1 record, though Washington claims a 3–0 record.

In the team's final game against Wooster, Washington & Jefferson led, 4–0, in the second half. As Wooster drove close to the Washington & Jefferson goal line, several of the Washington & Jefferson players "left the game and started at race horse speed for the dressing room, despite the cries on every side that time was not up and they still had 10 minutes to play." Wooster's captain grabbed the ball, ran the remaining three yards, and claimed a touchdown. Wooster then converted the kick for goal to take a 6 to 4 lead. The Washington & Jefferson team then left the field with their ball, protesting the Wooster touchdown. The umpire, a Washington & Jefferson supporter, upheld the protest and awarded the game to his side. The referee, a Wooster supporter, rejected the protest and awarded the game to his side. Another account awarded the game to Wooster by default as a result of Washington & Jefferson leaving the grounds.

== Schedule ==
Date	Opponent	Site	Result	Attendance	Source
November 1	Western University of Pennsylvania	College Park; Washington, PA	W 32–0		
November 8	East End Gymnastic Club	Washington, PA	W 10–0		
November 29	vs. Wooster	Recreation Park; Allegheny, PA	L 4–6	500	
