= 1890 Bucknell football team =

American college football season

1890 Bucknell football
- Conference: Independent
- Record: 1–4–1
- Head coach: None
- Captain: Charles Allen

1890 Eastern college football independents records
	Conf.			Overall
Team	W	L	T	W		L		T
Harvard		–		11	–	0	–	0
Yale		–		13	–	1	–	0
Princeton		–		11	–	1	–	1
Franklin & Marshall		–		8	–	2	–	0
Navy		–		5	–	1	–	1
Penn		–		11	–	3	–	0
Washington & Jefferson		–		2	–	1	–	0
Cornell		–		7	–	4	–	0
Lehigh		–		7	–	4	–	0
Syracuse		–		7	–	4	–	0
Springfield YMCA		–		5	–	3	–	0
Rutgers		–		5	–	5	–	1
Penn State		–		2	–	2	–	0
Western Univ. Penn		–		2	–	2	–	0
Colgate		–		1	–	1	–	0
Wesleyan		–		5	–	6	–	0
Tufts		–		2	–	3	–	0
NYU		–		2	–	4	–	0
Lafayette		–		2	–	5	–	1
Fordham		–		1	–	3	–	1
Brown		–		2	–	5	–	0
Bucknell		–		1	–	4	–	1
Massachusetts		–		1	–	4	–	0
Columbia		–		1	–	6	–	1
Army		–		0	–	1	–	0
Geneva		–		0	–	1	–	0

The 1890 Bucknell football team was an American football team that represented Bucknell University as an independent during the 1890 college football season. The team compiled a 1–4–1 record and had no head coach. Charles Allen was the team captain.

== Schedule ==
Date	Time	Opponent	Site	Result	Attendance	Source
October 4		at Lafayette	The Quad; Easton, PA	T 0–0		
October 17		at Dickinson	Athletic grounds; Carlisle, PA	W 12–0		
October 18	3:00 p.m.	at Franklin & Marshall	McGrann's Park; Lancaster, PA	L 6–22	1,200	
November 8		at Cornell	Ithaca, NY	L 0–26		
November 15	3:07 p.m.	at Wyoming Seminary	West Side Park; Wilkes-Barre, PA	L 0–12	600–2,000	
November 27	2:45 p.m.	at Franklin & Marshall	McGrann's Park; Lancaster, PA	L 10–12	2,000	
