= 1890 Harvard Crimson football team =

American college football season

1890 Harvard Crimson football
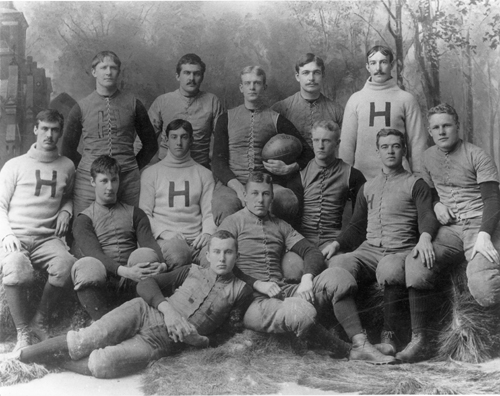

National champion (multiple selectors)
- Conference: Independent
- Record: 11–0
- Head coach: George A. Stewart & George C. Adams (1st season)
- Captain: Arthur Cumnock
- Home stadium: Jarvis Field

1890 Eastern college football independents records
	Conf.			Overall
Team	W	L	T	W		L		T
Harvard		–		11	–	0	–	0
Yale		–		13	–	1	–	0
Princeton		–		11	–	1	–	1
Franklin & Marshall		–		8	–	2	–	0
Navy		–		5	–	1	–	1
Penn		–		11	–	3	–	0
Washington & Jefferson		–		2	–	1	–	0
Cornell		–		7	–	4	–	0
Lehigh		–		7	–	4	–	0
Syracuse		–		7	–	4	–	0
Springfield YMCA		–		5	–	3	–	0
Rutgers		–		5	–	5	–	1
Penn State		–		2	–	2	–	0
Western Univ. Penn		–		2	–	2	–	0
Colgate		–		1	–	1	–	0
Wesleyan		–		5	–	6	–	0
Tufts		–		2	–	3	–	0
NYU		–		2	–	4	–	0
Lafayette		–		2	–	5	–	1
Fordham		–		1	–	3	–	1
Brown		–		2	–	5	–	0
Bucknell		–		1	–	4	–	1
Massachusetts		–		1	–	4	–	0
Columbia		–		1	–	6	–	1
Army		–		0	–	1	–	0
Geneva		–		0	–	1	–	0

The 1890 Harvard Crimson football team was an American football team that represented Harvard University in the 1890 college football season. The team finished with an 11–0 record, shut out nine of eleven opponents, and outscored all opponents by a total of 555 to 12.

The team also won Harvard's first national championship, receiving retroactive recognition as national champion from the Billingsley Report, Helms Athletic Foundation, Houlgate System, National Championship Foundation, and Parke H. Davis. On November 22, Harvard defeated Walter Camp's previously-unbeaten Yale Bulldogs to secure the championship; it was Harvard's first football victory over Yale since 1875. Harvard did not play Princeton (11–1–1) during the 1890 season.

Five Harvard players were selected by Caspar Whitney to the 1890 All-America college football team: quarterback Dudley Dean; halfback John J. Corbett; end Frank Hallowell; center John Cranston; and tackle Marshall Newell. Other players included end and team captain Arthur Cumnock, halfback James P. Lee, Herb Alward, Hiland Orlando Stickney, Bernard Trafford, and tackle Joshua Damon Upton. George A. Stewart and George C. Adams were the team's coaches.

== Schedule ==
Date	Time	Opponent	Site	Result	Attendance	Source
October 1		Phillips Exeter	Jarvis Field; Cambridge, MA	W 41–0		
October 4		Dartmouth	Jarvis Field; Cambridge, MA (rivalry)	W 45–0		
October 11		Amherst	Jarvis Field; Cambridge, MA	W 74–6		
October 18		Williams	Jarvis Field; Cambridge, MA	W 38–0		
October 22		Dartmouth	Jarvis Field; Cambridge, MA	W 64–0		
October 25		Bowdoin	Jarvis Field; Cambridge, MA	W 54–0		
October 29		Wesleyan	Jarvis Field; Cambridge, MA	W 55–0		
November 1		Cornell	Jarvis Field; Cambridge, MA	W 77–0		
November 4		Orange Athletic Club	Jarvis Field; Cambridge, MA	W 33–0		
November 12	2:30 p.m.	vs. Amherst	Hampden Park; Springfield, MA	W 64–0	500	
November 22	2:30 p.m.	vs. Yale	Hampden Park; Springfield, MA (rivalry)	W 12–6	15,000–17,000	

== Gallery of Harvard players ==
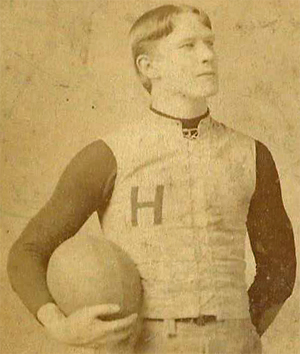
James P. Lee

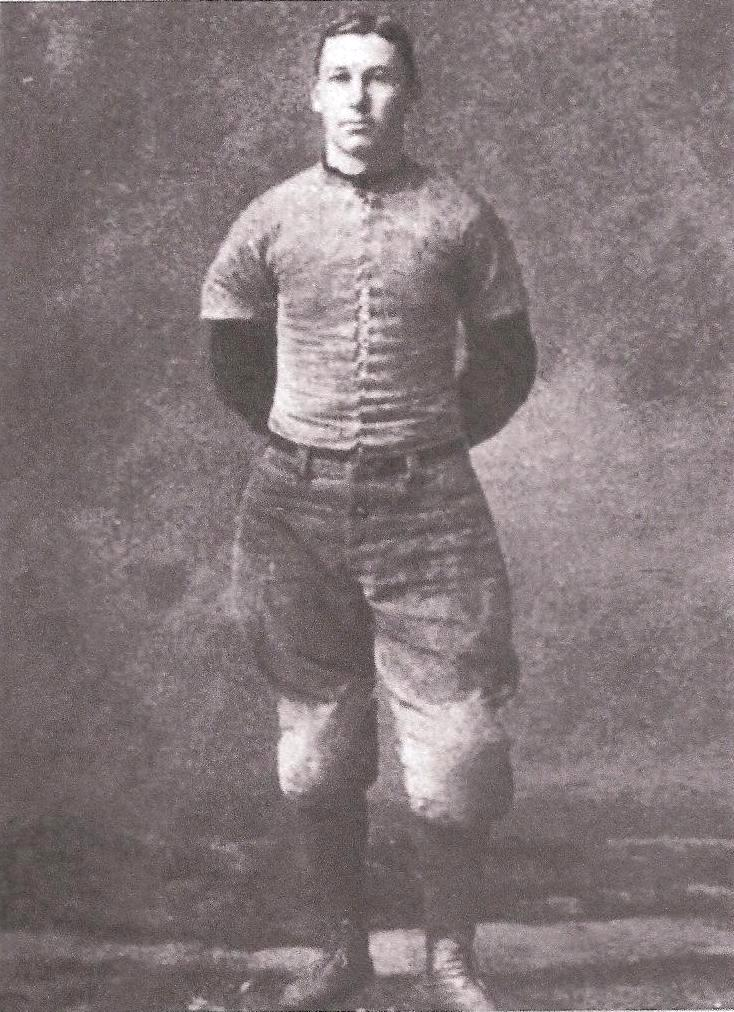
John Corbett

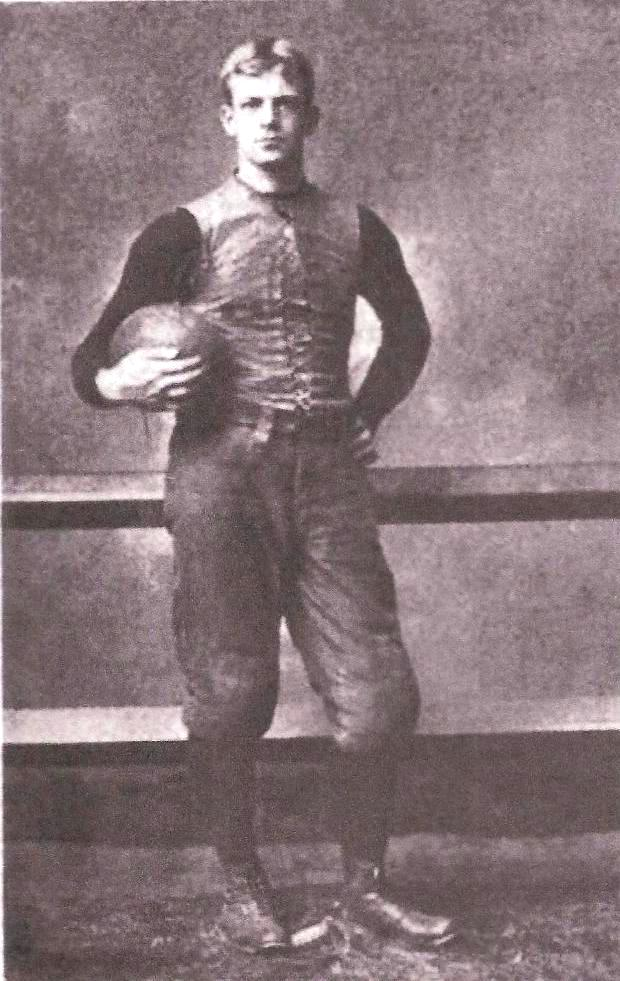
Arthur Cumnock

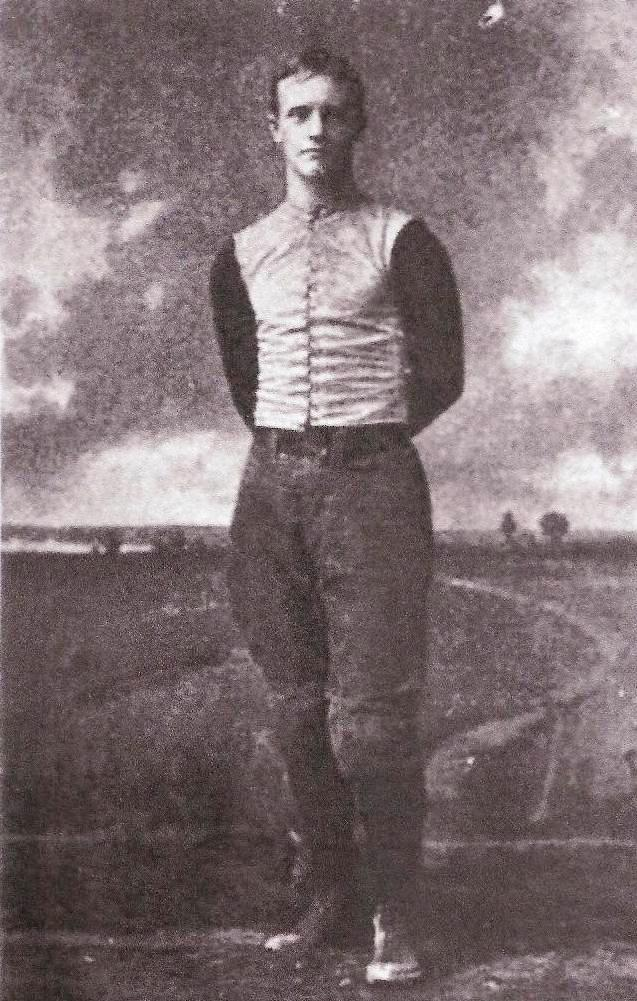
Dudley Dean

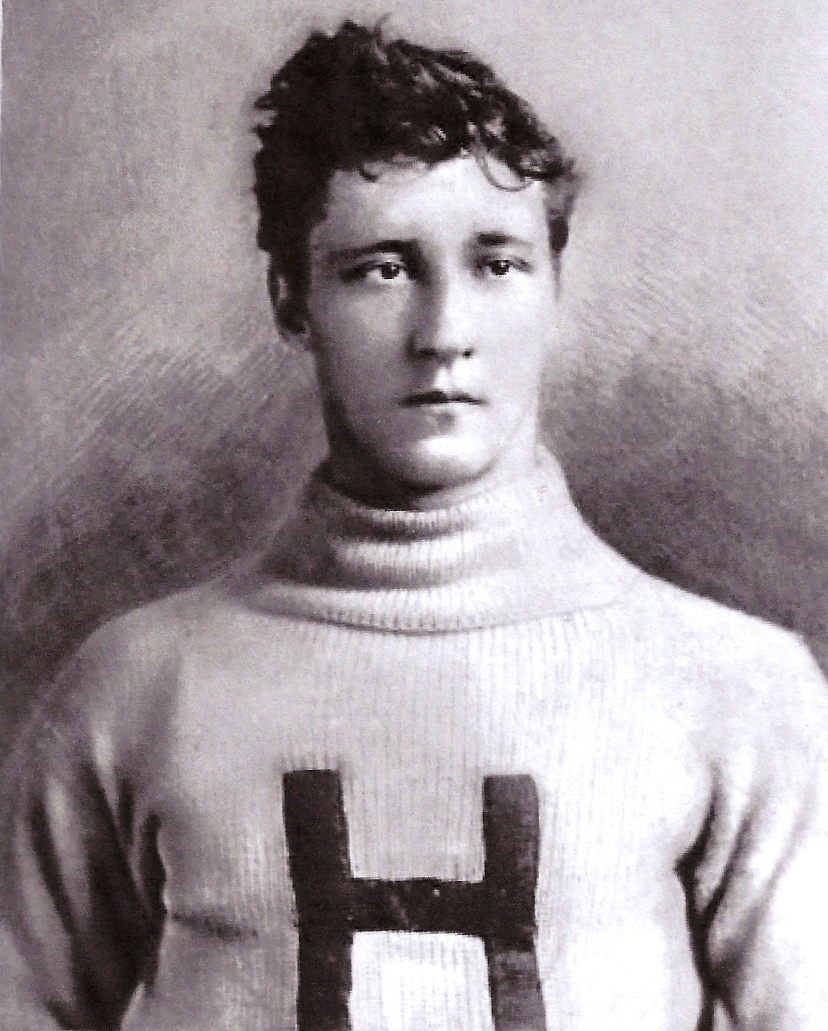
Marshall Newell
