= George C. Adams =

American football player and coach (1863–1900)

George Caspar Adams
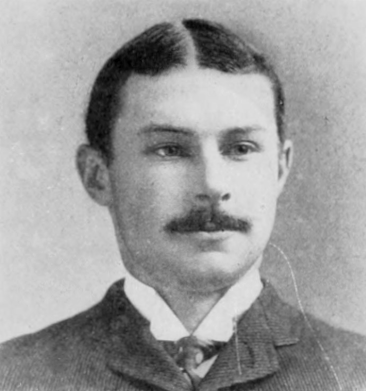

Biographical details
- Born: April 24, 1863; Boston, Massachusetts, U.S.
- Died: July 13, 1900 (aged 37); Quincy, Massachusetts, U.S.
- Education: Adams Academy (1882); Harvard University (1886)

Playing career
- 1883, 1886: Harvard
- Positions: End, rusher, halfback

Coaching career (HC unless noted)
- 1890–1892: Harvard

Head coaching record
- Overall: 34–2

Accomplishments and honors

Championships
- 1 national (1890)

George Caspar Adams (April 24, 1863 – July 13, 1900) was an American football player and former head coach of the Harvard University football program from 1890 to 1892. He co-coached with George A. Stewart, another Harvard graduate.

== Early life ==
Adams was born on April 24, 1863, in Boston, Massachusetts. He is a member of the Adams political family, which includes his father politician John Quincy Adams II and two United States Presidents, his great-grandfather John Quincy Adams and his great-great-grandfather John Adams. His mother was also a granddaughter of Benjamin Williams Crowninshield, United States Secretary of the Navy under presidents James Madison and James Monroe. Adams attended the Adams Academy before entering Harvard in 1882, where he graduated with an A.B. in 1886.

== Football career ==
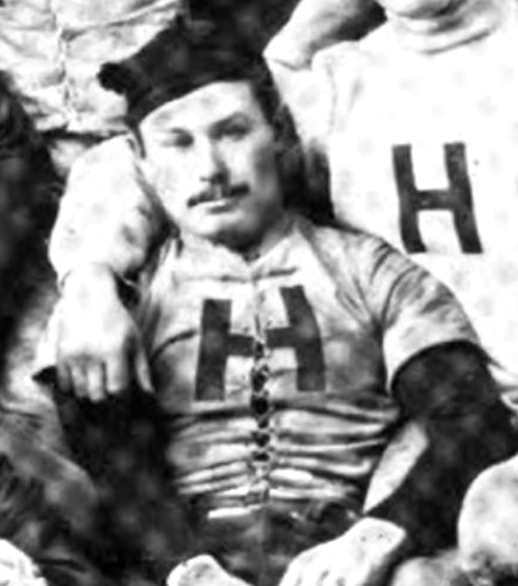
Adams on the Harvard football team in 1886

During his time as a student at Harvard, Adams played a vital role in reinstating the football program in 1886 for Harvard by heading a petition movement to the administration. Once the season was granted, Adams played on the team and assisted in managing and coaching it.

In 1890, Adams, along with another fellow alumnus, George A. Stewart (Class of 1884) were appointed as coaches for the Harvard football program of the upcoming season. In their first season, the team went 11–0, winning the national championship, also with five players being named All-Americans. The appointment of Adams and Stewart is widely regarded to be the beginning of an organized coaching system at Harvard.

=== Head coaching record ===
| Year | Team | Overall | Conference | Standing | Bowl/playoffs |
|---|---|---|---|---|---|
Harvard Crimson (Independent) (1890–1893)
| 1890 | Harvard | 11–0 | | | |
| 1891 | Harvard | 13–1 | | | |
| 1892 | Harvard | 10–1 | | | |
| Harvard: | | 34–2 | | | |
| Total: | | 34–2 | | | |
National championship Conference title Conference division title or championship game berth

== Later life ==
Adams later resided in Boston where he worked in real estate. He was also a recreational yachtsman who belonged to many yacht clubs. Adams died of tuberculosis in Quincy on July 13, 1900.
