= 1890 Army Cadets football team =

American college football season

1890 Army Cadets football
- Conference: Independent
- Record: 0–1
- Head coach: Dennis Michie (1st season)
- Captain: Dennis Michie
- Home stadium: The Plain

1890 Eastern college football independents records
	Conf.			Overall
Team	W	L	T	W		L		T
Harvard		–		11	–	0	–	0
Yale		–		13	–	1	–	0
Princeton		–		11	–	1	–	1
Franklin & Marshall		–		8	–	2	–	0
Navy		–		5	–	1	–	1
Penn		–		11	–	3	–	0
Washington & Jefferson		–		2	–	1	–	0
Cornell		–		7	–	4	–	0
Lehigh		–		7	–	4	–	0
Syracuse		–		7	–	4	–	0
Springfield YMCA		–		5	–	3	–	0
Rutgers		–		5	–	5	–	1
Penn State		–		2	–	2	–	0
Western Univ. Penn		–		2	–	2	–	0
Colgate		–		1	–	1	–	0
Wesleyan		–		5	–	6	–	0
Tufts		–		2	–	3	–	0
NYU		–		2	–	4	–	0
Lafayette		–		2	–	5	–	1
Fordham		–		1	–	3	–	1
Brown		–		2	–	5	–	0
Bucknell		–		1	–	4	–	1
Massachusetts		–		1	–	4	–	0
Columbia		–		1	–	6	–	1
Army		–		0	–	1	–	0
Geneva		–		0	–	1	–	0

The 1890 Army Cadets football team represented the United States Military Academy as an independent during the 1890 college football season. In the academy's first season fielding a team in intercollegiate football, the Cadets compiled a 0–1 record.

Football began being played at the academy in 1889, but only one inter-class match game was played that year. During the 1890 season, the Cadets played only one game, on the West Point grounds, losing to the Navy Midshipmen by a 24 to 0 score in the inaugural Army–Navy Game. A week before the game, The New York Times reported that the planned match "is beginning to assume almost national proportions." During the game, Army's quarterback Kirby Walker was knocked out of the game four times, the last time being carried off the field and to the hospital in an unconscious state.

After the victory, Navy cadets in Annapolis "fired twenty-four great guns, and then paraded the streets with horns."

A 20-year-old Army player, Dennis Michie, was the captain of the 1890 Army football team, though he is sometimes listed as the team's head coach. Michie was the lightest player on the team at 142 pounds. Michie was killed in 1898 during the Spanish–American War. Army's home football stadium, Michie Stadium, was dedicated in his honor when it opened in 1924.

No Army Cadets were honored on the 1890 College Football All-America Team.

== Schedule ==
Date	Opponent	Site	Result
November 29	Navy	The Plain; West Point, NY (Army–Navy Game)	L 0–24

== Players ==
The following individuals were members of Army's first intercollegiate football team in 1890.

- Butler Ames, '93, fullback
- James Bates Cavanagh, '92, substitute back
- Elmer W. Clark, '93, left guard, 205 pounds
- Joseph Thadeus Crabbe, '91, right guard
- Hanson Edward Ely, '91, substitute on rush line
- Willard E. Gleason, '92, left tackle
- John W. Heavey, '91, substitute on rush line
- Tiemann Newell Horn, '91, substitute back
- Dennis Michie, '92, captain and drop-kicks
- James T. Moore, '92, left end
- Jay Johnson Morrow, '91, substitute back
- Truman Oscar Murphy, '91, substitute on rush line
- Harry Howard Pattison, '93, substitute back
- Leonard Morton Prince, '92, right end
- Francis Henry Schoeffel, '91, right tackle
- Edward Julius Timberlake, Jr., '93, right halfback
- Kirby Walker, '92, quarterback, 145 pounds
- Frank Allen Wilcox, '92, substitute back
