= George A. Stewart =

American football coach

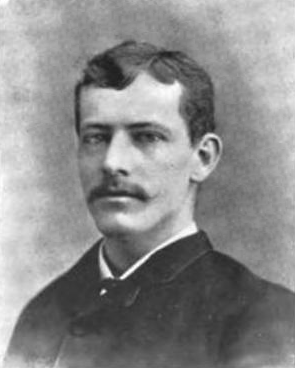

Biographical details
- Born: September 26, 1862; South Boston, Massachusetts, U.S.
- Died: June 21, 1894 (aged 31); Boston, Massachusetts, U.S.
- Education: Harvard University

Coaching career (HC unless noted)
- 1890–1893: Harvard

Head coaching record
- Overall: 46–3

Accomplishments and honors

Championships
- 1 national (1890)

George Andrew Stewart (September 26, 1862 – June 21, 1894) was an American football coach. He served as the head coach of the Harvard University football team from 1890 to 1893. From 1890 to 1892, he co-coached with George C. Adams, and in 1893, with Everett J. Lake.

Born in 1862 in South Boston, Stewart attended grammar and Latin schools in Boston before entering Harvard in 1880, graduating in the class of 1884. After graduating, in 1886, Stewart worked at the Boston Daily Globe, editing the yachting section. He was regarded as an authority on boating and yachts, and was a member of a yacht club and the Boston Athletic Association. He was regarded as a designer of boats. In 1890, Stewart, along with another fellow alumnus, George Adams (1886) were appointed by team captain Arthur Cumnock as coaches for the Harvard football program. In their first season, the 1890 Harvard team went 11–0 had five players named to the 1890 College Football All-America Team. The team was retroactively recognized as a national champion by a number of selectors. The appointment of Adams and Stewart is regarded to be the beginning of an organized coaching system at Harvard.

Stewart died of typhoid fever in 1894.

== Head coaching record ==
Year	Team	Overall	Conference	Standing	Bowl/playoffs
Harvard Crimson (Independent) (1890–1893)
1890	Harvard	11–0			
1891	Harvard	13–1			
1892	Harvard	10–1			
1893	Harvard	12–1			
Harvard:		46–3			
Total:		46–3			
National championship Conference title Conference division title or championship game berth
