= 1890 Crescent Athletic Club football team =

American college football season

1890 Crescent Athletic Club football

AFU champion
- Conference: American Football Union
- Record: 6–4 (3–1 AFU)
- Captain: William H. Ford
- Home stadium: Washington Park

1890 American Football Union standings
	Conf.					Overall
Team	W		L		T	W		L		T
Crescent Athletic Club $	3	–	1	–	0	6	–	4	–	0
Orange Athletic Club	3	–	1	–	0	5	–	4	–	1
New York Athletic Club	0	–	4	–	0	1	–	5	–	0

The 1890 Crescent Athletic Club football team was an American football team that represented the Crescent Athletic Club in the American Football Union (AFU) during the 1890 college football season. The team compiled a 6–4 record (3–1 against AFU opponents) and played its home games at Washington Park in Park Slope, Brooklyn, and the Crescent Club grounds in Bay Ridge, Brooklyn.

William H. Ford was the team captain and center rush. Other key players included Harry Beecher at quarterback, Wyllys Terry at halfback, William T. Bull at fullback, and Henry J. Lamarche and Frederick J. Vernon in the rush line.

== Schedule ==
Date	Opponent	Site	Result	Attendance	Source
September 27	at Stevens*	Polo Grounds; New York, NY	W 64–0		
October 4	Yale*	Washington Park; Brooklyn, NY	L 6–18	4,000	
October 18	Princeton*	Washington Park; Brooklyn, NY	L 0–12	3,000	
October 25	at New York Athletic Club	Polo Grounds; New York, NY	W 36–0		
November 1	Columbia*	Crescent Club grounds; Brooklyn, NY	W 29–0		
November 4	Yale*	Washington Park; Brooklyn, NY	L 0–52	8,000	
November 8	at Orange Athletic Club	Orange, NJ	L 5–8		
November 15	New York Athletic Club	Washington Park; Brooklyn, NY	W 40–8		
November 29	at Cleveland*	National League Park; Cleveland, OH	W 10–0		
December 6	Orange Athletic Club	Washington Park; Brooklyn, NY	W 14–0	550	
*Non-conference game
