= 1890 Lehigh football team =

American college football season

1890 Lehigh football
- Conference: Independent
- Record: 7–4
- Head coach: None

1890 Eastern college football independents records
	Conf.			Overall
Team	W	L	T	W		L		T
Harvard		–		11	–	0	–	0
Yale		–		13	–	1	–	0
Princeton		–		11	–	1	–	1
Franklin & Marshall		–		8	–	2	–	0
Navy		–		5	–	1	–	1
Penn		–		11	–	3	–	0
Washington & Jefferson		–		2	–	1	–	0
Cornell		–		7	–	4	–	0
Lehigh		–		7	–	4	–	0
Syracuse		–		7	–	4	–	0
Springfield YMCA		–		5	–	3	–	0
Rutgers		–		5	–	5	–	1
Penn State		–		2	–	2	–	0
Western Univ. Penn		–		2	–	2	–	0
Colgate		–		1	–	1	–	0
Wesleyan		–		5	–	6	–	0
Tufts		–		2	–	3	–	0
NYU		–		2	–	4	–	0
Lafayette		–		2	–	5	–	1
Fordham		–		1	–	3	–	1
Brown		–		2	–	5	–	0
Bucknell		–		1	–	4	–	1
Massachusetts		–		1	–	4	–	0
Columbia		–		1	–	6	–	1
Army		–		0	–	1	–	0
Geneva		–		0	–	1	–	0

The 1890 Lehigh football team was an American football team that represented Lehigh University in the 1890 college football season. The team compiled a 7–4 record and outscored opponents by a total of 282 to 125.

== Schedule ==
Date	Opponent	Site	Result	Attendance	Source
October 4	Swarthmore	Bethlehem, PA	W 50–0		
October 11	at Yale	Hamilton Park; New Haven, CT	L 0–26		
October 18	at Penn	University Athletic Grounds; Philadelphia, PA	L 0–8	2,500	
October 25	at Princeton	University Field; Princeton, NJ	L 0–50		
November 1	at Lafayette	The Quad; Easton, PA (The Rivalry)	W 30–0		
November 4	at Rutgers	College Field; New Brunswick, NJ	W 4–2		
November 8	Lehigh A.C.	Bethlehem, PA	W 60–6		
November 15	Lafayette	Bethlehem, PA	W 66–6		
November 22	Penn	Bethlehem, PA	L 14–17		
November 27	at Navy	Worden Field; Annapolis, MD	W 24–4		
November 29	at Columbia Athletic Club	Capitol Park; Washington, DC	W 34–6		
