= 1890 Amherst football team =

American college football season

1890 Amherst football
- Conference: Eastern Intercollegiate Football Association
- Record: 7–6–1 (3–1 EIFA)
- Head coach: None
- Captain: Harry C. Crocker
- Home stadium: Blake Field

1890 Eastern Intercollegiate Football Association standings
	Conf.					Overall
Team	W		L		T	W		L		T
Williams $	4	–	0	–	0	8	–	2	–	0
Amherst	3	–	1	–	0	7	–	6	–	1
Dartmouth	1	–	2	–	0	4	–	4	–	0
Boston Tech	0	–	2	–	0	4	–	4	–	1
Bowdoin	0	–	3	–	0	4	–	4	–	0
$ – Conference champion

The 1890 Amherst football team represented the Amherst College as a member of the Eastern Intercollegiate Football Association (EIFA) during the 1890 college football season. The team compiled an overall record of 7–6–1 with a mark of 3–1 in EIFA play. Two of Amherst's losses were to undefeated national champion Harvard. The team played home games at Blake Field in Amherst, Massachusetts.

== Schedule ==
Date	Time	Opponent	Site	Result	Attendance	Source
October 4	3:20 p.m.	Williston Seminary*	Blake Field; Amherst, MA	W 48–6		
October 9	4:15 p.m.	Massachusetts*	Blake Field; Amherst, MA	W 52–0		
October 11		at Harvard*	Jarvis Field; Cambridge, MA	L 6–74		
October 18	3:23 p.m.	Trinity (CT)*	Blake Field; Amherst, MA	W 12–11		
October 22	4:15 p.m.	at Wesleyan*	Wesleyan campus; Middletown, CT	L 6–8		
October 25	4:25 p.m.	Yale*	Blake Field; Amherst, MA	L 0–10		
October 29		at Trinity (CT)*	Trinity grounds; Hartford, CT	T 0–0		
November 1		at Boston Tech	South End Grounds; Boston, MA	W 38–4		
November 3	4:00 p.m.	Cornell*	Amherst, MA	W 18–0		
November 8		Bowdoin	Amherst, MA	W (forfeit)		
November 12	2:30 p.m.	vs. Harvard*	Hampden Park; Springfield, MA	L 0–64	500	
November 15	2:16 p.m.	at Williams	Weston Field; Williamstown, MA	L 0–6		
November 19	3:15 p.m.	Dartmouth	Blake Field; Amherst, MA	W 4–0	800	
November 22		at Springfield YMCA*	Hampden Park; Springfield, MA	L 0–20	3,000	
*Non-conference game
