= Bruce Griffith =

American soldier, football player, and coach

Biographical details
- Born: October 28, 1867; Pavia, Pennsylvania, U.S.
- Died: February 13, 1956 (aged 88); Topeka, Kansas, U.S.

Playing career
- 1889–1892: Franklin & Marshall
- Position: End

Coaching career (HC unless noted)
- 1891–1892: Franklin & Marshall

Head coaching record
- Overall: 6–7

Bruce Griffith (October 28, 1867 – February 13, 1956) was an American college football player and coach, missionary, and postmaster. He was the captain of the Franklin & Marshall College football team in Lancaster, Pennsylvania from 1891 to 1892, during a period of time when the captain also served as the team's head coach. Griffith led the team to a record of 6–7 in two seasons.

== Biography ==
Griffith was born on October 28, 1867, in Pavia Township, Bedford County, Pennsylvania. He attended Franklin & Marshall College, where he trained for the seminary and played football as an end. He moved to Wichita, Kansas in the 1890s, serving there as a missionary pastor for the Reformed Church before working in the insurance business with Aetna.

During the early 1900s, Griffith was commissioned as a colonel in the Kansas National Guard. During World War I, he served as a lieutenant colonel with the 130th Field Artillery Regiment at Fort Sill. U.S. president Herbert Hoover appointed Griffith as postmaster of Wichita, an office he held for four years.

== Death ==
Griffith died on February 13, 1956, at Winters U.S. Veterans Hospital, in Topeka, Kansas.

== Head coaching record ==
Year	Team	Overall	Conference	Standing	Bowl/playoffs
Franklin & Marshall (Independent) (1891–1892)
1891	Franklin & Marshall	2–4			
1892	Franklin & Marshall	4–3			
Franklin & Marshall:		6–7			
Total:		6–7			
