= 1890 Dartmouth football team =

American college football season

1890 Dartmouth football
- Conference: Eastern Intercollegiate Football Association
- Record: 4–4 (1–2 EIFA)
- Head coach: None
- Captain: Frank Lakeman

1890 Eastern Intercollegiate Football Association standings
	Conf.					Overall
Team	W		L		T	W		L		T
Williams $	4	–	0	–	0	8	–	2	–	0
Amherst	3	–	1	–	0	7	–	6	–	1
Dartmouth	1	–	2	–	0	4	–	4	–	0
Boston Tech	0	–	2	–	0	3	–	4	–	2
Bowdoin	0	–	3	–	0	4	–	4	–	0
$ – Conference champion

The 1890 Dartmouth football team represented Dartmouth College as a member of the Eastern Intercollegiate Football Association (EIFA) during the 1890 college football season. Dartmouth compiled an overall record of 4–4 with a mark of 1–2 in EIFA play. Charles O. Gill, capatain of the 1889 Yale Bulldogs football team spent two weeks coaching the team in September 1890. Frank Lakeman was the team's captain.

== Schedule ==
Date	Time	Opponent	Site	Result	Attendance	Source
October 3		Phillips Academy*	Hanover, NH	W 10–5		
October 4		at Harvard*	Jarvis Field; Cambridge, MA (rivalry)	L 0–45		
October 11		Vermont*	Hanover, NH	W 71–0		
October 22		at Harvard*	Jarvis Field; Cambridge, MA	L 0–64		
October 23		at Phillips Academy*	Andover, MA	W 10–0		
November 1		Bowdoin	Hanover, NH	W 42–0		
November 19	3:15 p.m.	at Amherst	Blake Field; Amherst, MA	L 0–4	800	
November 21	2:20 p.m.	at Williams	Weston Field; Williamstown, MA	L 0–6		
*Non-conference game
