= William Mann Irvine =

American academic and headmaster

William Mann Irvine (October 13, 1865 – June 11, 1928) was an American academic and founding headmaster of Mercersburg Academy in Mercersburg, Pennsylvania.

== Early life and education ==
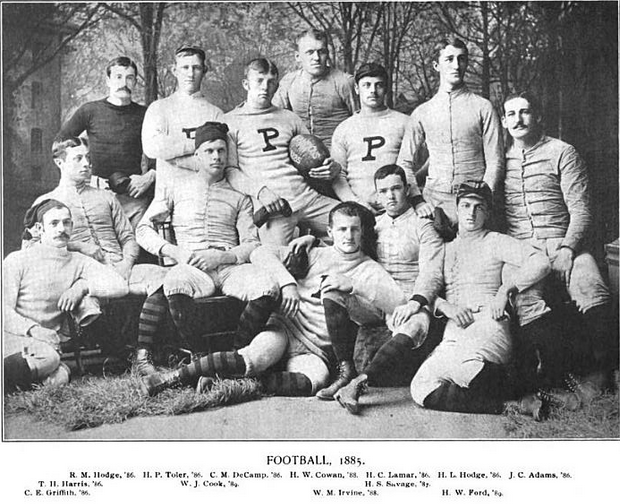
The Princeton Tigers football team during the 1885 season

Irvine was born on October 13, 1865, in Bedford, Pennsylvania, the son of Henry Fetter Irvine and Emma Elizabeth (Mann) Irvine. Irvine attended Bedford public schools in his early years, before enrolling at Phillips Exeter Academy at age 15. Irvine graduated fourth in his class at Exeter, then matriculated at Princeton University.

At Princeton, Irvine excelled academically and athletically. Among other activities, he served as president of his freshman class and managing editor of The Princetonian. Irvine won the South East Club University Fellowship in Social Science, allowing for a year of postgraduate study. He was a starting lineman on the Princeton football team all five years, during which the team achieved a record of 43–3–2 and won three consecutive national championships. He was named to the 1880s All-Decade Team as selected by the College Football Hall of Fame. Irvine received his Bachelor of Arts from Princeton in 1888 and his Doctor of Philosophy in political science from Princeton in 1891.

After graduating Princeton, Irvine attended Reformed Theological Seminary in Lancaster, Pennsylvania, graduating in 1892.

== Career ==
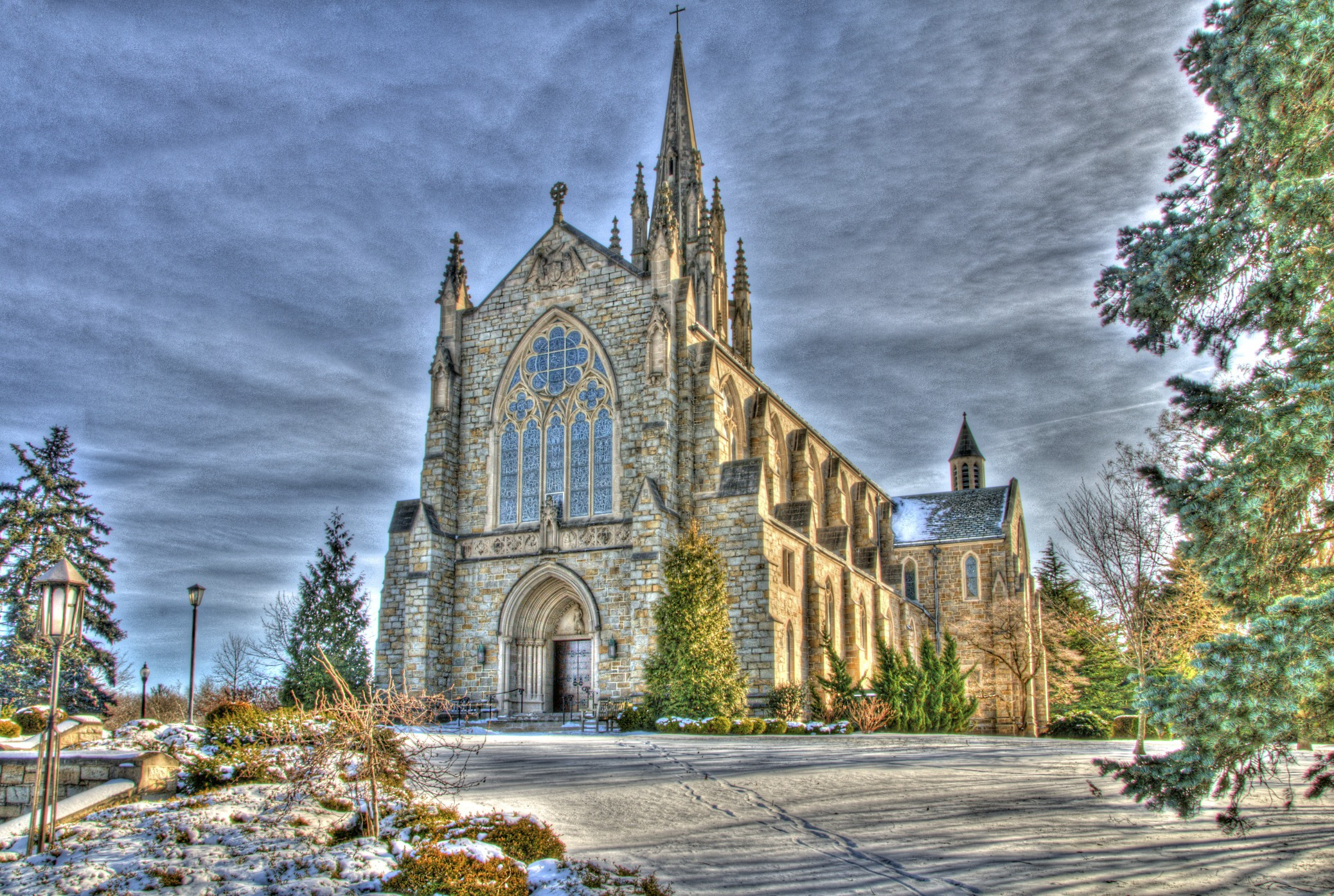
Irvine Memorial Chapel

Irvine contemplated becoming a pastor but was persuaded to enter teaching after completing his own formal education. He joined the faculty of Franklin & Marshall College as a professor of social science in 1892. In addition to teaching, Irvine helped establish the school's football program. He served as both the team's head coach and as a player and team captain.

At the age of 28, after only one year of teaching at Franklin & Marshall, Irvine was recruited by the board of regents of what was then Mercersburg College in Mercersburg, Pennsylvania to serve as that institution's president. By Irvine's account, the college was foundering. In July 1893, three months into his tenure, Irvine changed the name of the institution to Mercersburg Academy, establishing a preparatory school in the model of his alma mater, Exeter, and similar schools throughout New England.

Under Irvine's leadership, Mercersburg Academy developed dramatically. As enrollment increased, Irvine expanded the campus from four acres to over 120, constructing numerous new buildings along the way. The groundbreaking of one such building, the Eighty-eight Dormitory, was attended by Woodrow Wilson in 1903. Irvine met Wilson at Princeton, where Wilson was a professor and ultimately university president. The two kept in touch after Wilson was elected President of the United States. Irvine and his wife also enjoyed a relationship with President Calvin Coolidge and First Lady Grace Coolidge, whose sons, John and Calvin, Jr., attended Mercersburg. Grace Coolidge stayed at the Irvines' home when visiting her sons, and the Irvines stayed at the White House during Calvin Coolidge's presidency.

One of Irvine's most ambitious undertakings as headmaster was the construction of a chapel on Mercersburg's campus. Irvine engaged noted architect Ralph Adams Cram to design the building and spent decades overseeing its planning and construction. Construction was completed in 1926, and the chapel was dedicated to Mercersburg alumni killed in World War I. Grace Coolidge attended the dedication ceremony. The spire is a replica of that of University Church of St Mary the Virgin in Oxford, and it contains a traditional carillon.

Irvine was active in professional associations, serving as president of The Headmasters Association in 1921, president of the Association of Colleges and Schools of the Middle States and Maryland in 1922, and president of the Headmasters' Club of Philadelphia in 1923.

Irvine served as headmaster of Mercersburg for 35 years, until his death in 1928.

== Awards and honors ==
Irvine received numerous awards, honorary degrees, and other honors, including the following:

- Honorary Doctor of Laws from Franklin & Marshall College in 1910
- Honorary Doctor of Laws from Lafayette College in 1916
- Honorary Doctor of Laws from Princeton University (posthumously) in 1928
- Irvine Hall at Mercersburg Academy, dedicated in 1950
- Irvine Memorial Chapel at Mercersburg Academy, rededicated in 1993
- College Football Hall of Fame All-Decade Team (1880s)

== Personal life ==
Irvine married Camille Hart of Winchester, Virginia, in Washington, D.C., on June 26, 1894. They had three children: daughters Hart and Camille Irvine, and a son, William Mann Irvine Jr. Irvine Jr. died on his second birthday. Both Hart Irvine and Camille Irvine went on to marry members of the Mercersburg Academy faculty, John Dorman West and Clarke Winship Slade, respectively.

Irvine traveled extensively throughout his life, both within the United States and internationally. In 1903, he traveled with Sir Thomas Lipton aboard Lipton's yacht. In 1912, he visited Cuba for Christmas vacation as a guest of its former president, Domingo Méndez Capote, whose son attended Mercersburg. He toured Europe in 1924.

== Death and funeral ==
On June 5, 1928, Irvine was presiding over Mercersburg Academy's commencement exercises when he suffered a stroke to which he succumbed on June 11. His death was announced to the Mercersburg community by the playing of the academy hymn on the famed carillon in what is now the Irvine Memorial Chapel. His funeral was held in the chapel with eight of his students serving as pallbearers. He was buried at Fairview Cemetery, adjacent to campus. Irvine was survived by his wife, mother, and two daughters.
