= 1890 college football season =

American college football season

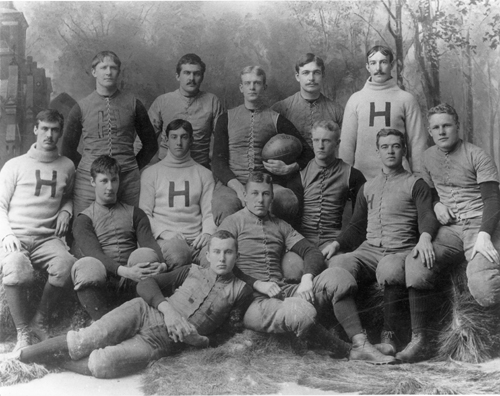
- 1890 Harvard Crimson
- Champion: Harvard

The 1890 college football season was the season of American football played among colleges and universities in the United States during the 1890–91 academic year.

The 1890 Harvard Crimson football team compiled a perfect 11–0 record, outscored opponents by a total of 555 to 12, and was recognized as the national champion by the Billingsley Report, Helms Athletic Foundation, Houlgate System, National Championship Foundation, and Parke H. Davis.

In the Midwest, the Baker Methodists defeated the Kansas Jayhawks by a score of 22–9 in the first college football game played in Kansas. In the South, Vanderbilt Commodores defeated Nashville (Peabody), 40–0, in the first college football game played in Tennessee.

As the popularity of the sport increased, several notable programs were established in 1890, including Ohio State, Colorado, Illinois, Kansas, Missouri, Nebraska, and Vanderbilt.

All eleven players selected by Caspar Whitney for the 1890 All-America college football team came from the Big Three (Harvard Princeton, and Yale). Three of the honorees have been inducted into the College Football Hall of Fame: Harvard's great tackle Marshall "Ma" Newell, Yale's guard Pudge Heffelfinger, and Yale's halfback Thomas "Bum" McClung.

== Conference and program changes ==
School	1889 Conference	1890 Conference
Army Black Knights	Program established	Independent
Butler Bulldogs	Independent	IIAA
Colorado Silver and Gold	Program established	Independent
DePauw Tigers	Independent	IIAA
Earlham Hustlin' Quakers	Independent	IIAA
Hanover Panthers	Independent	IIAA
Illinois Illini	Program Established	Independent
Indiana State Normal Sycamores	Independent	IIAA
Indiana Hoosiers	Independent	IIAA
Kansas Jayhawks	Program Established	Independent
Missouri Tigers	Program Established	Independent
Nashville	Program Established	Independent
Nebraska	Program Established	Independent
Ohio State Buckeyes	Program Established	Independent
Purdue Boilermakers	Independent	IIAA
Rose Polytechnic Engineers	Independent	IIAA
Vanderbilt football	Program Established	Independent
Wabash Little Giants	Independent	IIAA
Western Reserve football	Program established	Independent

== Awards and honors ==
=== All-Americans ===
The consensus All-America team included:

Position	Name	Height	Weight (lbs.)	Class	Hometown	Team
QB	Dudley Dean			Sr.	Lake Village, New Hampshire	Harvard
HB	Bum McClung	5'10"	165	Jr.	Knoxville, Tennessee	Yale
HB	John J. Corbett			Fr.	Boston, Massachusetts	Harvard
FB	Sheppard Homans, Jr.			Jr.	Englewood, New Jersey	Princeton
E	Frank Hallowell			So.	Medford, Massachusetts	Harvard
T	Marshall Newell	5'7"	168	Fr.	Great Barrington, Massachusetts	Harvard
G	Pudge Heffelfinger	6'4"	178	Jr.	Minneapolis, Minnesota	Yale
C	John Cranston			Sr.	Sheridan, New York	Harvard
G	Jesse Riggs			Jr.	Baltimore, Maryland	Princeton
T	William Rhodes			Sr.	Cleveland, Ohio	Yale
E	Ralph Warren			Jr.	Montclair, New Jersey	Princeton

=== Statistical leaders ===
- Player scoring most points: Philip King, Princeton, 145

== Conference standings ==
The following is a potentially incomplete list of conference standings:

1890 Colorado Football Association standings
	Conf.					Overall
Team	W		L		T	W		L		T
Colorado Mines $	3	–	0	–	0	6	–	0	–	0
Denver	2	–	1	–	0	3	–	2	–	0
Colorado College	1	–	2	–	0	2	–	3	–	0
Colorado	0	–	3	–	0	1	–	6	–	0
$ – Conference champion

1890 Eastern Intercollegiate Football Association standings
	Conf.					Overall
Team	W		L		T	W		L		T
Williams $	4	–	0	–	0	8	–	2	–	0
Amherst	3	–	1	–	0	7	–	6	–	1
Dartmouth	1	–	2	–	0	4	–	4	–	0
MIT	0	–	2	–	0	3	–	4	–	2
Bowdoin	0	–	3	–	0	4	–	4	–	0
$ – Conference champion

1890 Indiana Intercollegiate Athletic Association football standings
	Conf.					Overall
Team	W		L		T	W		L		T
Butler $	3	–	0	–	1	3	–	0	–	1
Purdue	2	–	1	–	0	3	–	3	–	0
Wabash	0	–	3	–	0	0	–	3	–	0
$ – Conference champion

=== Independents ===
1890 Eastern college football independents records
	Conf.			Overall
Team	W	L	T	W		L		T
Harvard		–		11	–	0	–	0
Yale		–		13	–	1	–	0
Princeton		–		11	–	1	–	1
Franklin & Marshall		–		8	–	2	–	0
Navy		–		5	–	1	–	1
Penn		–		11	–	3	–	0
Washington & Jefferson		–		2	–	1	–	0
Cornell		–		7	–	4	–	0
Lehigh		–		7	–	4	–	0
Syracuse		–		7	–	4	–	0
Springfield YMCA		–		5	–	3	–	0
Rutgers		–		5	–	5	–	1
Penn State		–		2	–	2	–	0
Western Univ. Penn		–		2	–	2	–	0
Colgate		–		1	–	1	–	0
Wesleyan		–		5	–	6	–	0
Tufts		–		2	–	3	–	0
NYU		–		2	–	4	–	0
Lafayette		–		2	–	5	–	1
Fordham		–		1	–	3	–	1
Brown		–		2	–	5	–	0
Bucknell		–		1	–	4	–	1
Massachusetts		–		1	–	4	–	0
Columbia		–		1	–	6	–	1
Army		–		0	–	1	–	0
Geneva		–		0	–	1	–	0

1890 Midwestern college football independents records
	Conf.			Overall
Team	W	L	T	W		L		T
Nebraska		–		2	–	0	–	0
Washington University		–		2	–	0	–	0
Minnesota		–		5	–	1	–	1
Michigan		–		4	–	1	–	0
Northwestern		–		4	–	1	–	1
Missouri		–		2	–	1	–	0
Cincinnati		–		2	–	1	–	1
Lake Forest		–		5	–	3	–	0
Baker		–		1	–	1	–	0
Iowa		–		1	–	1	–	0
Illinois		–		1	–	2	–	0
Kansas		–		1	–	2	–	0
Ohio Wesleyan		–		1	–	3	–	0
Wisconsin		–		1	–	3	–	0
Ohio State		–		1	–	4	–	0
Doane		–		0	–	1	–	0
Washburn		–		0	–	1	–	0
Western Reserve		–		0	–	3	–	0

1890 Southern college football independents records
	Conf.			Overall
Team	W	L	T	W		L		T
Furman		–		2	–	0	–	0
Vanderbilt		–		1	–	0	–	0
Virginia		–		5	–	2	–	0
Navy		–		5	–	1	–	1
Delaware		–		3	–	2	–	0
Georgetown		–		3	–	3	–	1
Columbian		–		2	–	3	–	0
Johns Hopkins		–		0	–	1	–	0
Nashville		–		0	–	1	–	0
Trinity (NC)		–		0	–	1	–	0
Richmond		–		0	–	3	–	0

1890 Far West college football independents records
	Conf.			Overall
Team	W	L	T	W		L		T
California		–		4	–	0	–	0
Washington		–		0	–	0	–	1
Colorado		–		0	–	4	–	0
