= 1890 Navy Midshipmen football team =

American college football season

1890 Navy Midshipmen football
- Conference: Independent
- Record: 5–1–1
- Head coach: None
- Captain: Charles Emrich

1890 Southern college football independents records
	Conf.			Overall
Team	W	L	T	W		L		T
Furman		–		2	–	0	–	0
Vanderbilt		–		1	–	0	–	0
Virginia		–		5	–	2	–	0
Navy		–		5	–	1	–	1
Delaware		–		3	–	2	–	0
Georgetown		–		3	–	3	–	1
Columbian		–		2	–	3	–	0
Johns Hopkins		–		0	–	1	–	0
Nashville		–		0	–	1	–	0
Trinity (NC)		–		0	–	1	–	0
Richmond		–		0	–	3	–	0

The 1890 Navy Midshipmen football team represented the United States Naval Academy during the 1890 college football season. The team compiled a 5–1–1 record and outscored its opponents 204 to 49. The season featured the inaugural meeting in the Army–Navy Game, which ended in a 24–0 victory for Navy. After the victory, Navy cadets in Annapolis "fired twenty-four great guns, and then paraded the streets with horns." Charles Emrich was the Navy team captain in 1890.

== Schedule ==
Date	Opponent	Site	Result	Source
October 18	St. John's (MD)	Unknown; Annapolis, MD	W 45–0	
November 1	Georgetown	Unknown; Annapolis, MD	W 70–4	
November 8	Dickinson	Unknown; Annapolis, MD	W 32–6	
November 12	Columbia Athletic Club	Unknown; Annapolis, MD	T 6–6	
November 19	Gallaudet	Unknown; Annapolis, MD	W 24–0	
November 27	Lehigh	Unknown; Annapolis, MD	L 4–24	
November 29	at Army	The Plain; West Point, NY (Army–Navy Game)	W 24–0	
