= Harold Hunt =

Harold Hunt may refer to:

- H. Guy Hunt (1933–2009), American politician from Alabama
- Harold Hunt (coach) (1907–1992), American football coach for Southwestern College
- Harold Hunt (professor) (1903–1977), Australian classical scholar and educationist
- Harold Hunt (pole vaulter), winner of the 1941 NCAA DI outdoor pole vault championship
