= Clinton L. Hare =

American football manager, organizer, and coach, lawyer, grocer

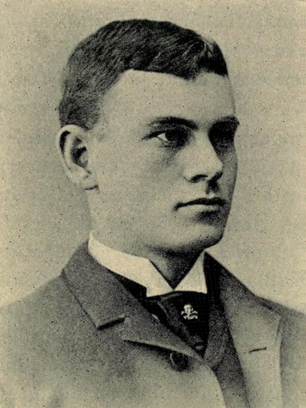
- Hare pictured in Quarter Century Record, Class of 1887, Yale College

Biographical details
- Born: November 7, 1864; Noblesville, Indiana, U.S.
- Died: June 4, 1909 (aged 44); Indianapolis, Indiana, U.S.
- Education: Yale University (1887)

Coaching career (HC unless noted)
- 1887: Butler
- 1889: Butler
- 1890: Purdue
- 1891: DePauw

Administrative career (AD unless noted)
- 1885–1886: Yale (football manager)

Head coaching record
- Overall: 10–5

Clinton Larue Hare (November 7, 1864 – June 4, 1909) was an American college football manager, organizer, and coach, and a lawyer and grocer. He served as the head football coach at Butler University for two seasons, in 1887 and 1889, at Purdue University for one season in 1890, and at DePauw University for one season in 1891, compiling a career coaching record of 10–5.

Hare graduated from Yale University in 1887, where he was a member of Skull and Bones. He was the manager of the Yale football team in 1885 and 1886. The 1886 Yale team went 9–0–1, outscored their opponents by a cumulative total of 687–4, and was later recognized as national co-champions with the Princeton team that they played to a scoreless tie in the season finale.

Hare later worked as an attorney, and owned and managed a wholesale grocery in his hometown of Indianapolis.

== Early life and college years ==
Hare was born on November 7, 1864, at his grandfather's house in Noblesville, Indiana. His parents were Marcus L. Hare and Julia A. (Haines) Hare, who resided in Indianapolis. Hare was raised in Indianapolis and attended the city's public schools including Shortridge High School.

Hare entered Yale University in the fall of 1883. At Yale, he participated in a number of athletic pursuits. He played on his class baseball team in the fall of his first two years in New Haven, rowed with his class crews as a sophomore and junior, and was a member of his class lacrosse team in his junior year. As a junior and senior, in the falls of 1885 and 1886, Hare was the manager of the varsity football team. As senior, he was also president of the University Football Association. In addition to athletics, Hare was a member of the Second Glee Club, the Chapel Choir, the Yale University Club, the Delta Kappa Epsilon fraternity, and Skull and Bones, a secret society founded at Yale in 1832. He graduated from Yale with the class of 1887.

In 1886, Hare and three others—Merrill Moores, Pirtle Herod, and William Bradshaw—formed the Indianapolis Athletic Association (IAA) to introduce football in Indiana. The IAA sponsored intercollegiate games involving teams from Butler University, Hanover College, Wabash College, and Franklin College in 1886 and 1887, and supplied players with train tickets for games played in Indianapolis.

== Coaching career ==
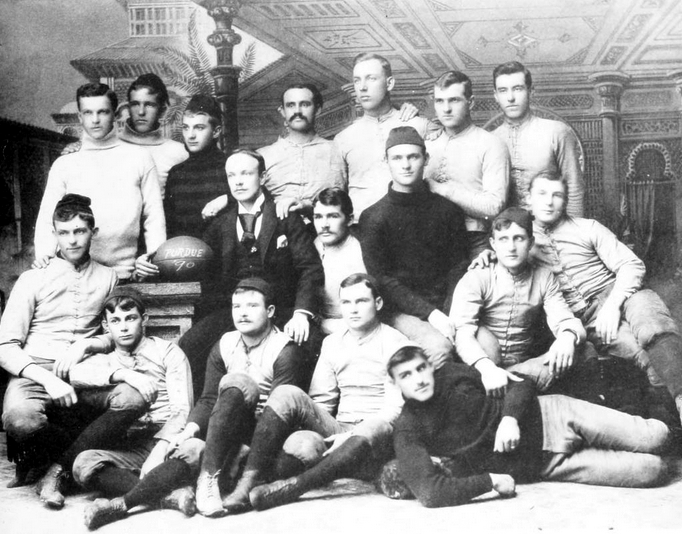
Hare's 1890 Purdue football team pictured in Debris 1891, Purdue yearbook

After graduating from Yale, Hare returned to Indianapolis in 1887 and became a football coach at Butler, where his teams won two successive state championships. In 1890, Hare became the third head football coach at Purdue University in West Lafayette, Indiana. He was succeeded by fellow Yale alumnus, Billy Crawford, as Butler's coach. Merrill Moores and some of Hare's other friends in Indianapolis felt that Hare had been unfair to Butler in leaving for Purdue. Crawford was also determined to "get back" at Hare, with whom he had a personal rivalry dating back to a political fight at Yale.

Hare coached the 1890 Purdue football team to a record of 3–3. Purdue won each of its two home games in convincing fashion, shutting out Wabash, 54–0, on October 24 and Illinois, 62–0, on November 22. They also shut out DePauw in Greencastle, Indiana, 32–0. Purdue suffered its worst loss of the season on November 1 in Ann Arbor, falling to Michigan by a score of 34 to six. Hare's squad also dropped their season opener in Chicago on October 18 to the Chicago All-University team, 10–6, and their season finale on November 27 against Hare's former team, Butler, by a score of 12 to 10. With their wins over DePauw and Wabash and their loss to Butler, Purdue tallied a 2–1 mark against their opponents from within the state of Indiana. Hare's team finished second place in the Indiana Intercollegiate Athletic Association to Butler, who beat all three of their in-state foes and was awarded the state championship.

The following year, in 1891, Hare coached the football team at DePauw University. In his one season with DePauw, he guided his team to a record of 3–1. DePauw opened the season with strong wins over Butler and Indiana, but lost on November 7 to Hare's former team, Purdue, in West Lafayette, by a score of 30 to zero. The season concluded with DePauw's acceptance of a forfeit from Wabash.

== Legal and business career ==
Hare began his legal career in March 1888 when he entered the Indianapolis law firm of Harrison, Miller & Elam as a student. He was admitted to the bar two years later, in 1890. In November 1888, the firm's titular partner and senior member, Benjamin Harrison, was elected as President of the United States. Harrison appointed his advisor and fellow partner in the firm, William H. H. Miller to the post of United States Attorney General. At this time Hare became the attorney for the Board of Children's Guardians, a body created by the Indiana General Assembly in 1889 to investigate and manage cases of child neglect. A fellow member of the Indianapolis Bar remarked on Hare's acumen in serving his client:

In the trial of cases for the board he showed high ability as a lawyer. His mind acted quickly. He was always thoroughly prepared. He handled his evidence well. He was a ready speaker and spoke with clearness and force.

In November 1894, Hare was appointed as cashier to the clerk of the Indiana Circuit Court. He held the post for eight years. In 1899, Hare purchased a controlling interest in J. C. Perry & Company, a wholesale grocer in Indianapolis. Shortly thereafter, he joined the executive committee of Indiana's Wholesale Grocer's Association, and later became president of the organization.

== Family, personal life, and death ==
Hare married Marea Ritzinger on October 14, 1891. She was the daughter of J. B. Ritzinger and Myla (Fletcher) Ritzinger of Indianapolis. Hare and his wife had six children: Helen (born February 5, 1894), John Maurice (born February 2, 1897), Clinton Larue Jr. (born July 18, 1898), Robert Ritzinger (born October 15, 1899), Myla (born March 3, 1903), and Laura (born January 9, 1906). In 1905, their home in Indianapolis was robbed of diamonds valuing over $3,000. Marea was a friend of Pulitzer Prize-winning novelist Booth Tarkington. In 1923, she sold a house she had had built in 1911 on North Meridian Street in Indianapolis to Tarkington for $37,000.

Hare was a Presbyterian and, as a member of the Republican Party, he was active in local political affairs. After a period of illness lasting more than one year, Hare died of throat cancer, at his home in Indianapolis, on June 4, 1909. He was buried at Crown Hill Cemetery in Indianapolis.

== Head coaching record ==
Year	Team	Overall	Conference	Standing	Bowl/playoffs
Butler Christians (Independent) (1887)
1887	Butler	2–1 (Note: National Collegiate Athletic Association (NCAA) and Butler records indicate that the 1887 Butler team had a record of 3–0, but contemporary coverage shows that Butler lost its final game of the season, on November 12, to Hanover, and thus compiled a 2–1 record.)			
Butler Christians (Independent) (1889)
1889	Butler	2–0			
Butler:		4–1 (Note: National Collegiate Athletic Association (NCAA) and Butler records indicate that "Clint Howe", an apparent misspelling of Clinton L. Hare, was Butler's coach in 1890, but contemporary coverage shows that Billy Crawford coached Butler in 1890, while Hare coached at Purdue.)			
Purdue (Indiana Intercollegiate Athletic Association) (1890)
1890	Purdue	3–3	2–1	2nd	
Purdue:		3–3	2–1		
DePauw (Indiana Intercollegiate Athletic Association) (1891)
1891	DePauw	3–1	3–1		
DePauw:		3–1	3–1		
Total:		10–5			

== See also ==
- List of grocers
