= 1890 Purdue football team =

American college football season

1890 Purdue football
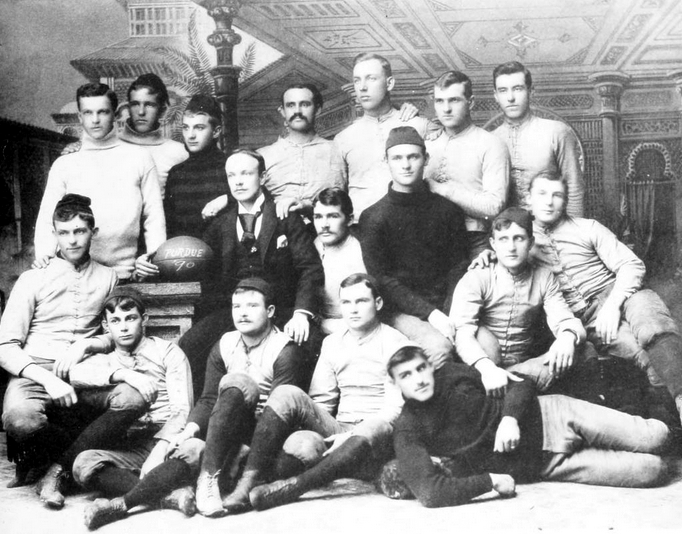
- 1890 Purdue football team, pictured in Debris 1891, Purdue yearbook
- Conference: Indiana Intercollegiate Athletic Association
- Record: 3–3 (2–1 IIAA)
- Head coach: Clinton L. Hare (1st season)
- Captain: Robert A. Lackey

1890 Indiana Intercollegiate Athletic Association football standings
	Conf.					Overall
Team	W		L		T	W		L		T
Butler $	3	–	0	–	1	3	–	0	–	1
Purdue	2	–	1	–	0	3	–	3	–	0
Wabash	0	–	3	–	0	0	–	3	–	0
$ – Conference champion

The 1890 Purdue football team was an American football team that represented Purdue University during the 1890 college football season. The team compiled a 3–3 record in the university's third season fielding an intercollegiate football team. Clinton L. Hare, a Yale alumnus who had been the coach of the Butler football teams that handed Purdue its sole losses in 1887 and 1889, was hired as Purdue's football coach in 1890. On November 1, 1890, Purdue lost to Michigan, 34–6, in the first football game between two teams that would later become members of the Big Ten Conference. Three weeks after losing to Michigan, Purdue defeated Illinois, 62–0. The team concluded its 1890 season with a loss to Butler, leaving Purdue 0–3 in three games against Butler football teams since 1887.

Robert A. Lackey was the team captain.

== Schedule ==
Date	Time	Opponent	Site	Result	Attendance	Source
October 18	3:30 p.m.	at Chicago All-University*	National League Park; Chicago, IL	L 6–10		
October 25		Wabash	Lafayette, IN	W 54–0		
November 1		at Michigan*	Ann Arbor Fairgrounds; Ann Arbor, MI	L 6–34		
November 15		at DePauw	Ball grounds; Greencastle, IN	W 32–0		
November 22		Illinois*	Lafayette, IN (rivalry)	W 62–0		
November 27	2:30 p.m.	at Butler	Y.M.C.A. Park; Indianapolis, IN	L 10–12	3,000–4,000	
*Non-conference game

== Roster ==
- W. P. Finney
- Herkless
- A. L. Hillis
- Hougham
- Bob Lackey
- Little
- Joe McCarthy
- John Moore
- Charles Olds
- Polk
- Rufus Ratliff
- J. M. Sholl
- Archibald Stevenson
- Studebaker
- Teeters
- Thompson
