= Salem Goodale =

American football coach

Biographical details
- Born: September 16, 1871; Marshalltown, Iowa, U.S.
- Died: August 22, 1931 (aged 59); Millbrae, California, U.S.
- Education: Lake Forest College

Coaching career (HC unless noted)
- 1890–1891: Baker

Head coaching record
- Overall: 6–2–1

Salem Wales Goodale (September 16, 1871 – August 22, 1931) was an American college football coach and physician. He was the head football coach at Baker University in Baldwin City, Kansas, serving from 1890 to 1891, and compiling a record of 6–2–1. Goodale was the first victorious head college football coach in Kansas. He was the head coach at Baker for the first college football game played in the state of Kansas. On November 22, 1890, his team beat the Kansas Jayhawks by a score of 22–9.

Goodale later practiced as a physician in San Francisco, and was a pioneering resident of Millbrae, California. He died on August 22, 1931.

== Head coaching record ==
Year	Team	Overall	Conference	Standing	Bowl/playoffs
Baker Methodists (Independent) (1890–1891)
1890	Baker	1–1			
1891	Baker	5–1–1			
Baker:		6–2–1			
Total:		6–2–1			
