= 1890 Baker Methodists football team =

American college football season

1890 Baker Methodists football
- Conference: Independent
- Record: 1–1
- Head coach: Salem Goodale (1st season)

1890 Midwestern college football independents records
	Conf.			Overall
Team	W	L	T	W		L		T
Nebraska		–		2	–	0	–	0
Washington University		–		2	–	0	–	0
Minnesota		–		5	–	1	–	1
Michigan		–		4	–	1	–	0
Northwestern		–		4	–	1	–	1
Missouri		–		2	–	1	–	0
Cincinnati		–		2	–	1	–	1
Lake Forest		–		5	–	3	–	0
Baker		–		1	–	1	–	0
Iowa		–		1	–	1	–	0
Illinois		–		1	–	2	–	0
Kansas		–		1	–	2	–	0
Ohio Wesleyan		–		1	–	3	–	0
Wisconsin		–		1	–	3	–	0
Ohio State		–		1	–	4	–	0
Doane		–		0	–	1	–	0
Washburn		–		0	–	1	–	0
Western Reserve		–		0	–	3	–	0

The 1890 Baker Methodists football team represented Baker University in the 1890 college football season. They finished with a record of 1–1 in their inaugural season.

== Schedule ==
Date	Opponent	Site	Result	Source
November 22	Kansas	Baldwin City, KS (first college football game played in Kansas)	W 22–9	
December 8	at Kansas	Lawrence, KS	L 12–14	

== See also ==
- Timeline of college football in Kansas
- List of the first college football game in each US state
