= William C. Malley =

American football player and coach

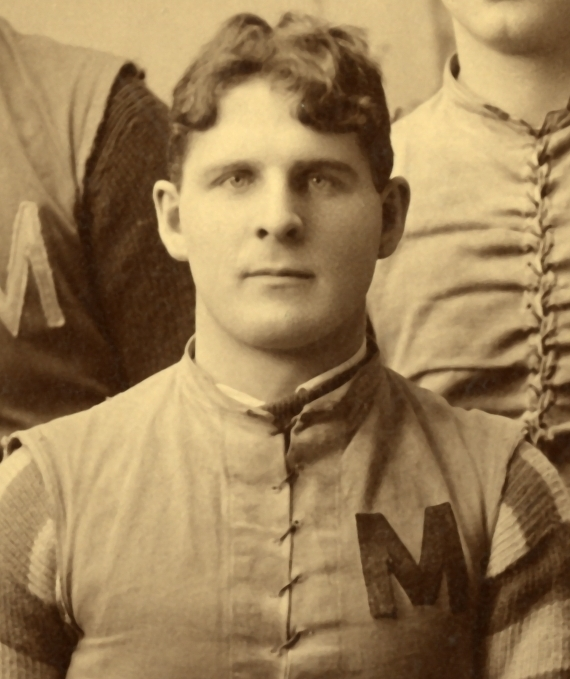
- Malley, captain of the 1890 Michigan Wolverines football team

Biographical details
- Born: c. 1868
- Died: June 17, 1908 (aged 40); Chicago, Illinois, U.S.

Playing career
- 1888–1890: Michigan
- 1891: University Club of Chicago
- 1892: Chicago Athletic Association
- Positions: Tackle, guard

Coaching career (HC unless noted)
- 1892: Wabash
- 1897–1898: Michigan (assistant)

Head coaching record
- Overall: 1–4

William Charles Malley (c. 1868 – June 17, 1908) was an American football player and coach. He played college football for the University of Michigan from 1888 to 1890 and served as the head football coach to Wabash College in 1892.

== Playing career ==
A native of Chicago, Illinois, Malley played tackle and guard for the University of Michigan Wolverines football teams from 1888 to 1890. He was the captain of the 1890 team that finished with a 4–1 record.

Returning to his home city, Malley played football for the University Club of Chicago in 1891 and the Chicago Athletic Association in 1892.

== Coaching career ==
=== Wabash ===
In 1892 Malley became the head football at Wabash College in Crawfordsville, Indiana. He held that position for one season and his record at Wabash was 1–4.

=== Michigan ===
Malley returned to the University of Michigan as an assistant football coach for the 1897 and 1898 Michigan Wolverines football teams.

== Later years ==
Malley graduated from Michigan's law department in 1891 and became employed with the law firm of Moran, Kraus & Mayer. He later went into partnership with Edwin W. Sims, who became the U.S. Attorney in Chicago. His father, John O'Malley, built the first packing house in Chicago. Malley later became an election commissioner in Chicago. In December 1907, the Chicago Daily Tribune reported that Malley, at age 39, was said to be "hopelessly insane." Family difficulties relating to an unhappy marriage were reported to have resulted in a breakdown. He died six months later at age 40.

== Head coaching record ==
Year	Team	Overall	Conference	Standing	Bowl/playoffs
Wabash (Indiana Intercollegiate Athletic Association) (1892)
1892	Wabash	1–4	1–4		
Wabash:		1–4	1–4		
Total:		1–4			
