= 1890 Missouri Tigers football team =

American college football season

1890 Missouri Tigers football
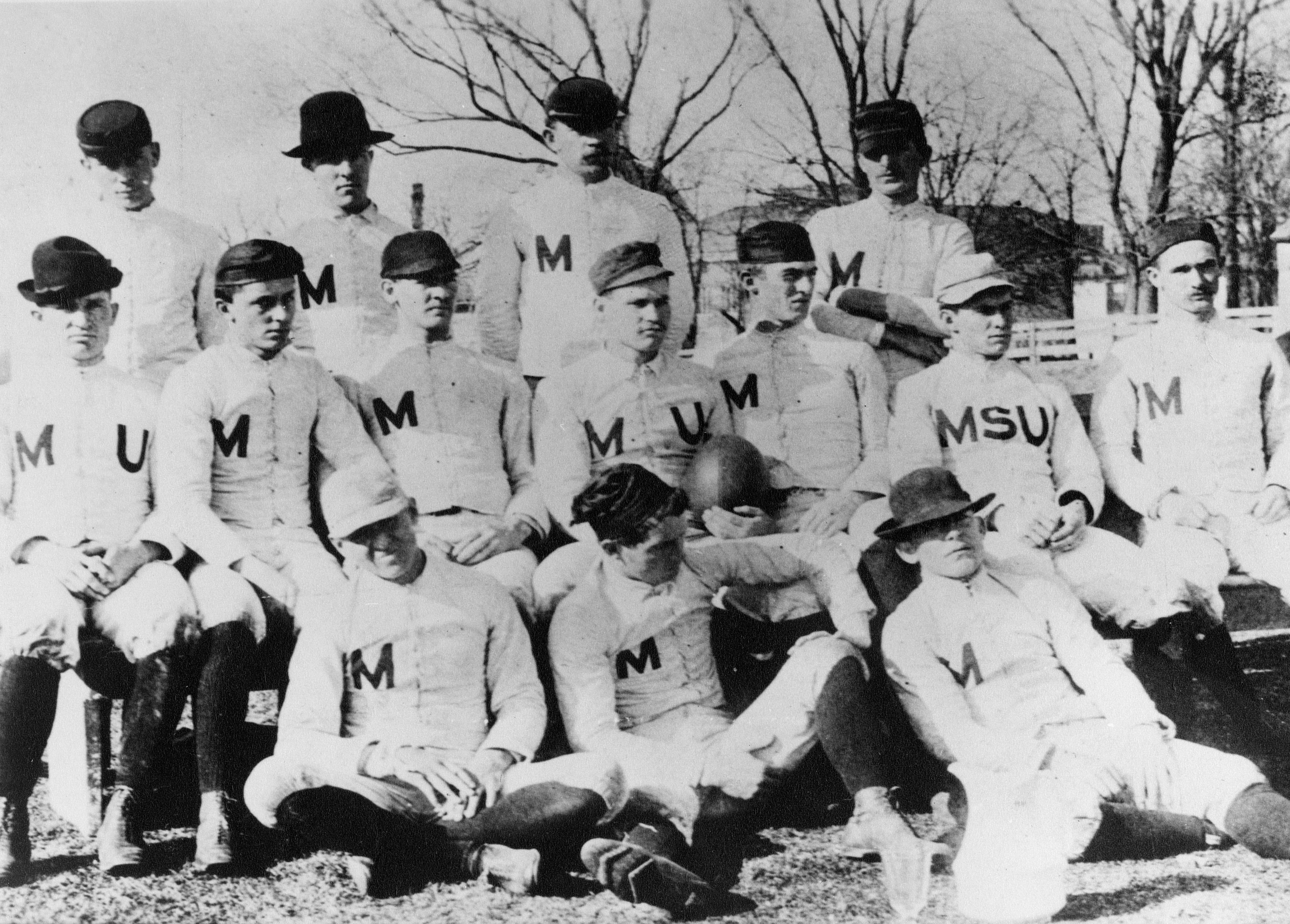
- Conference: Independent
- Record: 2–1
- Head coach: A. L. McRae (1st season)
- Captain: William R. Litterill

1890 Midwestern college football independents records
	Conf.			Overall
Team	W	L	T	W		L		T
Nebraska		–		2	–	0	–	0
Washington University		–		2	–	0	–	0
Minnesota		–		5	–	1	–	1
Michigan		–		4	–	1	–	0
Northwestern		–		4	–	1	–	1
Missouri		–		2	–	1	–	0
Cincinnati		–		2	–	1	–	1
Lake Forest		–		5	–	3	–	0
Baker		–		1	–	1	–	0
Iowa		–		1	–	1	–	0
Illinois		–		1	–	2	–	0
Kansas		–		1	–	2	–	0
Ohio Wesleyan		–		1	–	3	–	0
Wisconsin		–		1	–	3	–	0
Ohio State		–		1	–	4	–	0
Doane		–		0	–	1	–	0
Washburn		–		0	–	1	–	0
Western Reserve		–		0	–	3	–	0

The 1890 Missouri Tigers football team was an American football team that represented the University of Missouri as an independent during the 1890 college football season. In the school's first season of intercollegiate football, the team was led by head coach A. L. McRae and compiled a 2–1 record.

== Schedule ==
Date	Opponent	Site	Result	Attendance	Source
October 20	Picked team	Columbia, MO	W 22–6		
November 27	at Washington University	Sportsman's Park; St. Louis, MO	L 0–28	5,000	
December 1	Engineers Eleven	Columbia, MO	W 90–0		
