= 1951 Southwestern Moundbuilders football team =

American college football season

1951 Southwestern Moundbuilders football
- Conference: Central Intercollegiate Conference
- Record: 1–7–1 (0–5 CIC)
- Head coach: Harold Hunt (3rd season)
- Home stadium: Sonner Stadium

1951 Central Intercollegiate Conference football standings
	Conf.					Overall
Team	W		L		T	W		L		T
Pittsburg State +	4	–	1	–	0	7	–	3	–	0
Emporia State +	4	–	1	–	0	5	–	3	–	1
Washburn	3	–	2	–	0	6	–	3	–	0
Fort Hays State	2	–	3	–	0	5	–	4	–	0
St. Benedict's	2	–	3	–	0	4	–	5	–	0
Southwestern (KS)	0	–	5	–	0	1	–	7	–	1
+ – Conference co-champions

The 1951 Southwestern Moundbuilders football team represented Southwestern College as member of the Central Intercollegiate Conference (CIC) during the 1951 college football season. In their third and final season under head coach Harold Hunt, the Moundbuilders compiled an overall record of 1–7–1 with a mark of 0–5 in conference play, placing last out of six teams in the CIC. Southwestern played home games at Sonner Stadium in Winfield, Kansas.

== Schedule ==
Date	Opponent	Site	Result	Attendance	Source
September 14	Central Missouri State*	Sonner Stadium; Winfield, KS	T 6–6		
September 21	Kansas Wesleyan*	Winfield, KS	L 7–14		
September 28	at Fort Hays State	Hays, KS	L 0–34		
October 6	Olathe NAS*		L 12–18		
October 13	at Emporia State	Emporia, KS	L 14–52		
October 20	at Pittsburg State	Brandenburg Stadium; Pittsburg, KS	L 0–55	9,000	
October 26	at Northwestern Oklahoma State*	Alva, OK	W 19–7		
November 3	St. Benedict's^{†}	Winfield, KS	L 6–12		
November 9	at Washburn	Topeka, KS	L 6–28		
*Non-conference game; ^{†}Homecoming
