= 1890 Kansas vs. Baker football game =

First American football game played in the state of Kansas

- First college football game in Kansas
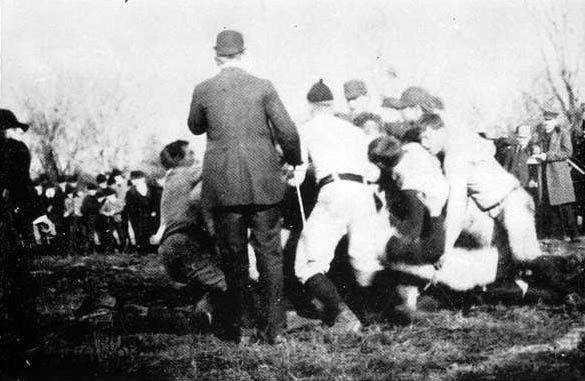
| Kansas Jayhawks | Baker Methodists |
| (0–0) | (0–0) |
| 9 | 22 |
| Head coach: Will Coleman | Head coach: Salem Goodale |
| | 1 | 2 | 3 | 4 | Total |
|---|---|---|---|---|---|
| Kansas | 0 | 9 | 0 | 0 | 9 |
| Baker | 8 | 0 | 8 | 6 | 22 |
- Date: November 22, 1890
- Season: 1890
- Location: Baldwin City, Kansas

The 1890 Kansas vs. Baker football game was an American college football game between the Kansas Jayhawks football team of the University of Kansas and the Baker Methodists football (now nicknamed the Wildcats) team of Baker University played on November 22, 1890 in Baldwin City, Kansas. The game ended with Baker winning 22–9. It was the first college football game played in the state of Kansas.

== See also ==
- 1890 college football season
- Timeline of college football in Kansas
- List of the first college football game in each US state
