= Tom Eck =

American athlete and sports coach

Biographical details
- Born: April 10, 1856; Prince Albert, British North America
- Died: June 6, 1926 (aged 70); Chicago, Illinois, U.S.

Coaching career (HC unless noted)

Football
- 1890: Minnesota

Track
- 1915–?: Chicago

Head coaching record
- Overall: 5–1–1 (football)

Tom Eck (April 10, 1856 – June 6, 1926) was an American athlete and sports coach. He served as the head football coach at the University of Minnesota for one season, in 1890, compiling a record of 5–1–1. He died on June 5, 1926, in Chicago.

== Head coaching record ==
=== Football ===
Year	Team	Overall	Conference	Standing	Bowl/playoffs
Minnesota Golden Gophers (Independent) (1890)
1890	Minnesota	5–1–1			
Minnesota:		5–1–1			
Total:		5–1–1			
