= 1890 Cincinnati football team =

American college football season

1890 Cincinnati football
- Conference: Independent
- Record: 2–1–1
- Head coach: None
- Captain: Henry Bettman
- Home stadium: Cincinnati Ball Park

1890 Midwestern college football independents records
	Conf.			Overall
Team	W	L	T	W		L		T
Nebraska		–		2	–	0	–	0
Washington University		–		2	–	0	–	0
Minnesota		–		5	–	1	–	1
Michigan		–		4	–	1	–	0
Northwestern		–		4	–	1	–	1
Missouri		–		2	–	1	–	0
Cincinnati		–		2	–	1	–	1
Lake Forest		–		5	–	3	–	0
Baker		–		1	–	1	–	0
Iowa		–		1	–	1	–	0
Illinois		–		1	–	2	–	0
Kansas		–		1	–	2	–	0
Ohio Wesleyan		–		1	–	3	–	0
Wisconsin		–		1	–	3	–	0
Ohio State		–		1	–	4	–	0
Doane		–		0	–	1	–	0
Washburn		–		0	–	1	–	0
Western Reserve		–		0	–	3	–	0

The 1890 Cincinnati football team was an American football team that represented the University of Cincinnati as an independent during the 1890 college football season. The team compiled a record of 2–1–1. Henry Bettman was the team captain. The team had no head coach.

== Schedule ==
Date	Opponent	Site	Result	Attendance	Source
	Franklin	Cincinnati, OH	T 0–0		
	Woodward High School	Cincinnati, OH	L 8–16		
	Wyoming (OH)	Cincinnati, OH	W 6–0		
November 27	Wyoming (OH)	Cincinnati Ball Park; Cincinnati, OH	W 8–4	500	
