= 1890 Michigan Wolverines football team =

American college football season

1890 Michigan Wolverines football
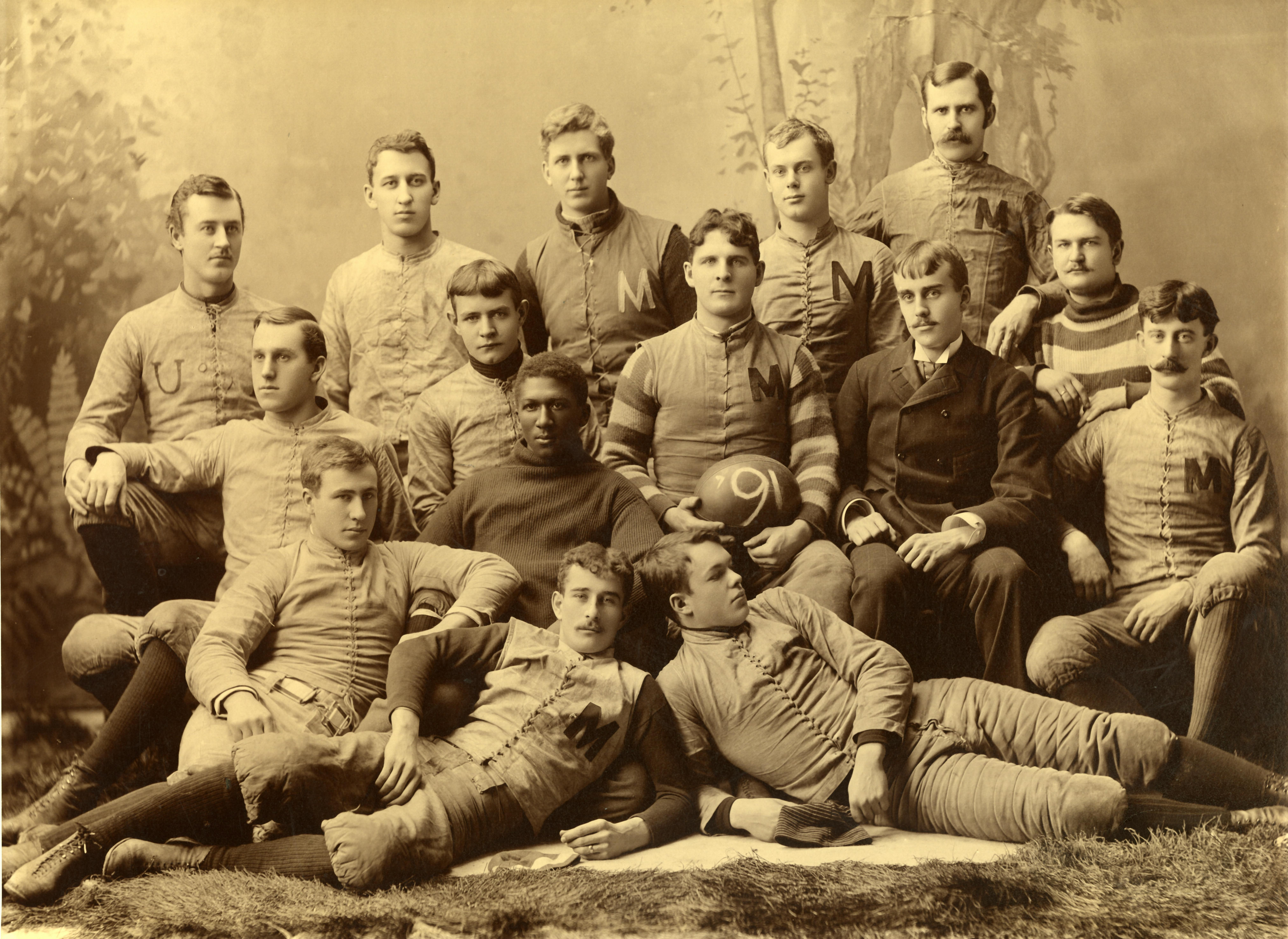
- Conference: Independent
- Record: 4–1
- Head coach: None
- Captain: William C. Malley
- Home stadium: Ann Arbor Fairgrounds

1890 Midwestern college football independents records
	Conf.			Overall
Team	W	L	T	W		L		T
Nebraska		–		2	–	0	–	0
Washington University		–		2	–	0	–	0
Minnesota		–		5	–	1	–	1
Michigan		–		4	–	1	–	0
Northwestern		–		4	–	1	–	1
Missouri		–		2	–	1	–	0
Cincinnati		–		2	–	1	–	1
Lake Forest		–		5	–	3	–	0
Baker		–		1	–	1	–	0
Iowa		–		1	–	1	–	0
Illinois		–		1	–	2	–	0
Kansas		–		1	–	2	–	0
Ohio Wesleyan		–		1	–	3	–	0
Wisconsin		–		1	–	3	–	0
Ohio State		–		1	–	4	–	0
Doane		–		0	–	1	–	0
Washburn		–		0	–	1	–	0
Western Reserve		–		0	–	3	–	0

The 1890 Michigan Wolverines football team was an American football team that represented the University of Michigan in the 1890 college football season. The team compiled a 4–1 record and outscored its opponents by a combined score of 129 to 36. The team's sole loss was to Cornell in the final game of the season.

The team had no coach, and its captain was William C. Malley. George P. Codd, who later served as the Mayor of Detroit and in the United States Congress, was the team's manager. George Jewett, who played at the fullback and halfback positions, was the team's leading scorer with 50 points on 11 touchdowns (four points each) and three kicks for goal from touchdown (two points each). Jewett was also the first African American to play football at Michigan.

== Schedule ==
Date	Time	Opponent	Site	Result	Attendance
October 11	3:00 p.m.	Albion	Fair Grounds; Ann Arbor, MI	W 56–10	350
October 18	3:50 p.m.	at Detroit Athletic Club	Detroit, MI	W 38–0	250
October 25		at Albion	Albion, MI	W 16–0	
November 1	3:10 p.m.	Purdue	Fair Grounds; Ann Arbor, MI	W 34–6	
November 15	3:00 p.m.	vs. Cornell	Recreation Park; Detroit, MI	L 5–20	2,000

== Season summary ==
=== Preseason ===
The team had no coach during its 1890 season. Practice sessions began in late September under the leadership of the team's captain William C. Malley. One of the new features introduced by Malley during the pre-season practice was the "V" formation used successfully in the East. The U. of M. Daily noted: "[T]he spectators have had many a laugh as the boys would form an invincible V and split the wind with it, but if they had nothing but the wind to buck against, they have at least been learning to stand shoulder to shoulder."

Malley ran announcements in the student newspaper inviting interested players to try out for the team. In the days leading up to the first game, football practice was conducted on campus at 4:20 p.m. each day.

Horace Greely Prettyman provided a training table at which football candidates could eat supper, and a bath and dressing room for use by the football players was established in the basement of the medical building.

Two new players stood out in the pre-season practice sessions: halfback George Jewett, who had "played a rattling game" for Ann Arbor High School in 1889; and center Thomas L. Chadbourne, who had played center for Phillips Exeter Academy in 1889. Although Jewett in 1890 became the first African American to play football for Michigan, no mention of his race is found in the pre-season coverage.

By mid-October 1890, as the football season began, the University of Michigan had an enrollment of 2,246 students. The U. of M. Daily expressed concern when "only about a dozen men were out for foot-ball practice" on October 6, five days before the opening game.

On October 14, 1890, an open meeting was held by the school's Rugby Association (the football team's governing body at that time) to discuss the future of, and funding for, the football team. Only 27 students attended the meeting. A letter published in the U. of M. Daily reported that all of the association's officers were absent, though captain William C. Malley presided in a praiseworthy manner. The letter's author expressed concern over the lack of spirit for the football team among the school's students: "Now, this is deplorable! It is discouraging to those few U. of M. patriots who have trained so faithfully under Captain Malley's direction for the past two weeks."

=== Albion ===
Game 1: Albion at Michigan

Team	1	2	Total
• Michigan	20	36	56
Albion	4	6	10

- Date: October 11
- Location: Fair Grounds, Ann Arbor, MI
- Game attendance: 350

Michigan opened its season on October 11, 1890, with a 56–10 victory over the team from Albion College. The game began at 3:00 p.m. before a crowd of approximately 350 persons at the Fair Grounds in Ann Arbor. The game marked the first appearance of an African-American, George Jewett, for a Michigan football team. In his debut, Jewett scored four touchdowns and kicked two goals for touchdown to account for 20 of Michigan's points. According to the U. of M. Daily, "Jewett's running was the feature of the game." James Van Inwagen also scored three touchdowns, and Horace Greely Prettyman, Lawrence Grosh, and Sutherland each scored one.

Despite the lopsided score, The Chronicle-Argonaut was critical of the team's performance: "Last Saturday's game with Albion showed quite conclusively that our foot ball players are not yet in the best of form. Though the score was 56–10 in our favor, still Albion ought not to have scored at all and our men should have made more points, if we expect to hold our own when we meet a team that can play. The men did not play with their heads, were very weak in blocking and did not follow the ball as they should have done, nor did they respond to signals readily enough."

Michigan's lineup against Albion was Roger Sherman (left end), S. Sherman (left tackle), Trainer (left guard), Chadbourne (center), Sutherland (right guard), Malley (right tackle), James Van Inwagen (right end), Abbott (quarterback), George Jewett and Lawrence Grosh (halfbacks), and George Dygert (fullback).

=== Detroit Athletic Club ===
Game 2: Michigan at Detroit Athletic Club

Team	1	2	Total
• Michigan	18	20	38
Detroit Athletic Club	0	0	0

- Date: October 18
- Location: Detroit
- Game attendance: 250

On October 18, 1890, Michigan defeated the Detroit Athletic Club (D.A.C.) Triangles, 38–0, before a crowd of approximately 250 persons in Detroit. A steady rain began to fall at 2:00 in the afternoon and continued intermittently throughout the game, which started at 3:50 p.m. The first half was 45 minutes. Michigan used a wedge or "V" formation with center Thomas L. Chadbourne as the fulcrum; the Detroit Free Press described Chadbourne as a huge man who shook off D.A.C. players "as he would drops of water."

In the first half, William C. Malley and George Jewett each scored two touchdowns, Jewett converted on one of four kicks for goal, and Michigan led, 18–0, at halftime. In the second half, darkness and steady rain made it difficult to see the game from the stands. Michigan scored four more touchdowns (three by Jewett and one by Chadbourne) and kicked two goals from touchdown. David Trainer of Michigan was kicked out of the game for "shin kicking." One published account of the game noted: "Jewett's play was a revelation to the Detroiters and his work was fully up to standard. . . . A detailed account of the game is unnecessary since it was simply a series of rushes, touchdowns and trials at goals by the U. of M., the latter generally unsuccessful by reason of the rain, which prevented any brilliant playing."

Football was still a novelty in Detroit, and the Detroit Free Press wrote: "Detroit is not educated up to a proper appreciation of the game of foot ball, and it is questionable if that event will ever come about. . . . The visitors mopped the field with our fellows, and created in the minds of spectators a very unfavorable impression of the sport: for what is the use of playing a game, if, every time a man tries to do something meritorious, 1,600 pounds of Ann Arbor intellectuality tumbles on him like an avalanche and bores him into the earth in search of a vein of crude oil?"

Michigan's starting lineup against D.A.C. was Roger Sherman (left end), S. Sherman (left tackle), Clark J. Sutherland (left guard), Thomas L. Chadbourne (center), David Trainer Jr. (right guard), William C. Malley (right tackle), Thomas L. McKean (right end), George S. Holden (quarterback), George Jewett (left halfback), Lawrence C. Grosh (right halfback), and George Dygert (fullback). William Pearson appeared after Trainer was ejected from the game.

=== Albion ===
Game 3: Michigan at Albion

Team	1	2	Total
• Michigan	10	6	16
Albion	0	0	0

- Date: October 25
- Location: Albion, MI

On October 25, 1890, Michigan defeated Albion, 16–0, at Albion, Michigan. On Michigan's opening possession, George Jewett led a drive with gains of 10, 5, and 20 yards. Lawrence Grosh carried the ball for a touchdown, and Michigan led, 4–0. A short time later, Grosh scored again with Michigan playing in a "V" formation. Jewett kicked a goal, and Michigan led, 10–0 at halftime. Shortly before the end of the first half, Albion scored on a long touchdown run by its halfback Anderson, but the referee ruled that the ball was not properly passed in. In the second half, Jewett scored a touchdown on the longest run of the game and kicked the goal to extend the lead to 16–0.

After Jewett's long touchdown run, Albion had the ball. At the end of a scrimmage, the umpire (Albion's manager) blew his whistle to disqualify Michigan's center Thomas L. Chadbourne for slugging. At that time, Albion's quarterback Burnham emerged from the crowd and ran the distance of the field with the ball. The referee (Van Nortwick, '93, of Michigan) ruled that time had been called before Burnham's run and ordered the ball brought back. Albion refused and claimed that Burnham had scored a touchdown. Having had two touchdowns disallowed, Albion refused to play further, though 25 minutes remained in the game. The game was then declared a forfeit with the score 16–0 in Michigan's favor.

Michigan's starting lineup against Albion was Roger Sherman (left end), William W. Pearson (left tackle), David Trainer Jr. (left guard), Chadbourne (center), Clark J. Sutherland (right guard), William C. Malley (right tackle), Thomas L. McKean (right end), George S. Holden (quarterback), Jewett (halfback), Grosh (halfback), and George Dygert (fullback). Roger Sherman was disqualified in the second half and replaced by Sam Sherman; Sutherland was also disqualified and replaced by McMorran. Bert Carr who later played for Michigan was the starting left guard for Albion.

=== Purdue ===
Game 4: Purdue at Michigan

Team	1	2	Total
Purdue	6	0	6
• Michigan	14	20	34

- Date: November 1
- Location: Fair Grounds, Ann Arbor, MI

On November 1, 1890, Michigan defeated Purdue by a 34–6 score at the Fair Grounds in Ann Arbor. The game began at 3:10 p.m. Lawrence Grosh scored Michigan's first two touchdowns, but the kicks for goal from touchdown were unsuccessful. Michigan led, 8–0. George Jewett scored Michigan's third touchdown, and the goal was kicked to extend the lead to 14–0. Near the end of the half, Purdue scored a touchdown and kicked goal to narrow Michigan's halftime lead to 14–6. In the second half, Grosh scored two touchdowns, and James E. Duffy and William C. Malley each scored one. Duffy also kicked a goal.

The game was the first between two football programs that would later become members of the Big Ten Conference. It received a total of six lines of coverage in the Detroit Free Press. The newspaper noted: "The game was hotly contested. James E. Duffy, the famous halfback of the team of '88 and '89, played in the game, relieving Jewett, who was injured."

Michigan's lineup against Purdue was Roger Sherman (left end), Pearson (left tackle), Trainer (left guard), Chadbourne (center), S. Sherman (right guard), Malley (right tackle), McKeon (right end), Holden (quarterback), Jewett, Grosh, and Duffy (halfbacks), and George Dygert (fullback).

=== Cornell ===
Game 5: Cornell vs. Michigan

Team	1	2	Total
• Cornell	10	10	20
Detroit Athletic Club	0	5	5

- Date: November 15
- Location: Recreation Park, Detroit
- Game attendance: 2,000

On November 15, 1890, Michigan lost to Cornell by a 20–5 score before a crowd of at least 2,000 persons at Recreation Park in Detroit. A special train carried 850 Michigan students, including 50 female students, from Ann Arbor to Detroit. The U. of M. Daily called it the largest delegation ever to travel from Ann Arbor in support of a Michigan sporting team.

The game began at approximately 3:00 p.m. Early in the game, George Jewett returned a punt through the whole Cornell team for a touchdown, but the touchdown was disallowed on the ground that a Michigan player (William C. Malley) was offside when the ball was snapped. Halfback Ray of Cornell then scored a touchdown, but Cornell missed the kick for goal and took a 4–0 lead. Osgood, another Cornell halfback, scored a second touchdown, fullback Bacon kicked goal, and Cornell led, 10–0, at halftime. In the second half, Cornell scored two more touchdowns, including one score on a blocked Michigan punt.

Late in the game, Michigan scored five points on a drop-kicked field goal by James E. Duffy "from the sixty-yard mark." The Cornell Sun expressed amazement at Duffy's kick: "Osgood and Bacon exchange kicks with Duffy, who makes a fair catch at the 50-yard line. From this catch Duffy made the most brilliant play of the afternoon and probably the most difficult of its kind ever made on a foot-ball field. Cornell did not expect a drop-kick for goal and everybody was surprised to see the attempt and more surprised at its result."

Cornell was aware of Michigan's strategy of focusing its attack through the center, Thomas L. Chadbourne, and stopped Michigan's attack by massing its players at the center. The U. of M. Daily was critical of Michigan for not varying the attack with end runs and quick punts. The Daily also accused the umpire of prejudice against Michigan for (i) fabricating an off-side penalty to disallow Jewett's long run for touchdown, and (ii) then unfairly disqualifying Jewett, the one Michigan player who was having success in breaking through Cornell's line, even though Jewett was "the very last man on the team to be suspected of intentional rough play."

Michigan's lineup against Cornell was Roger Sherman (left end), Horace Greely Prettyman (left tackle), David Trainer Jr. (left guard), Chadbourne (center), Clark J. Sutherland (right guard), Malley, William W. Harless, and William W. Pearson (right tackle), Thomas L. McKean (right end), George S. Holden (quarterback), Duffy and Malley (halfback), Lawrence C. Grosh (halfback), and Jewett and Duffy (fullback).

=== Post-season ===
After losing to Cornell, Michigan cancelled a game that had been scheduled with DePauw for November 22. The team's management that the benefit of a game with "a somewhat weak team" was outweighed by the expense to be incurred in bringing the DePauw team to Ann Arbor.

The U. of M. Daily noted improvement in the performance of the 1890 team over the 1889 team. Whereas the 1889 team had lost to Cornell by more than 50 points, the 1890 team lost by only 15 points. Stung by criticism in The Cornell Sun of Michigan's performance, the Daily vowed that the team would play Cornell even better in 1891, "for we propose to start the season early, employ a coach, take an eastern practice trip, and learn the game of which we 'do not know the first principles' in the opinion of the Cornell Sun."

== Personnel ==
=== Varsity letter winners ===
The following 13 players received varsity letters for their participation on the 1890 Michigan football team.

- Thomas L. Chadbourne, Vinton, Iowa – started 5 games at center
- James E. Duffy, Ann Arbor, Michigan – started 2 games at halfback
- Lawrence C. Grosh, Toledo, Ohio – started 5 games at halfback
- William W. Harless, Chicago, Illinois – guard
- George S. Holden, Palmer, Massachusetts – started 4 games at quarterback
- George Jewett, Ann Arbor, Michigan – started 4 games at halfback, 1 game at fullback
- William C. Malley, Chicago, Illinois – started 5 games at right tackle
- Thomas L. McKean, Edgerton, Ohio – started 4 games at right end
- Thomas J. McKeon, end, Howard, North Dakota (Howard, South Dakota?)
- Horace Prettyman, Bryan, Ohio – started 1 game at tackle
- Roger Sherman, Chicago, Illinois – started 5 games at left end
- Clark J. Sutherland, Oxford, Michigan – started 3 games at right guard, 1 game at left guard
- David Trainer Jr., Thurlow, Pennsylvania – started 4 games at left guard, 1 game at right guard

=== Others ===
Additional players included on Michigan's 1890 roster include the following:

- Howard Abbott, Minneapolis, MN – started 1 game at quarterback
- Edward Paul DePont, Ann Arbor, MI
- George Dygert, Ann Arbor, MI – started 4 games at fullback
- Steven L. Glidden, Glanville, IL
- Metcalfe Bradley Hatch
- John Raymond, McGurren, Chicago, IL
- David William McMorran, Port Huron, Michigan
- William W. Pearson, left tackle, Springfield, IL
- Alfred Day Rathbone, Grand Rapids, MI
- Sam Sherman, Chicago, Illinois – started 2 games at left tackle, 1 game at right guard
- James Van Inwagen, end, Chicago, IL – started 1 game at right end
- George Monroe Wisner, Detroit, MI

=== Scoring leaders ===
Player	Touchdowns	Goals from TD	Field goals	Safeties	Total
George Jewett	11	3	0	0	50
Lawrence Grosh	7	0	0	0	28
William C. Malley	3	0	0	0	12
James Van Inwagen	3	0	0	0	12
James E. Duffy	1	1	1	0	11
Thomas L. Chadbourne	1	0	0	0	4
Horace Greely Prettyman	1	0	0	0	4
Clark J. Sutherland	1	0	0	0	4
na	0	2	0	0	4
Total	28	6	1	0	129

=== Coaching staff ===
- Coach: no coach
- Captain: William C. Malley
- Manager: George P. Codd
