= 1890 Western Reserve football team =

American college football season

1890 Western Reserve football
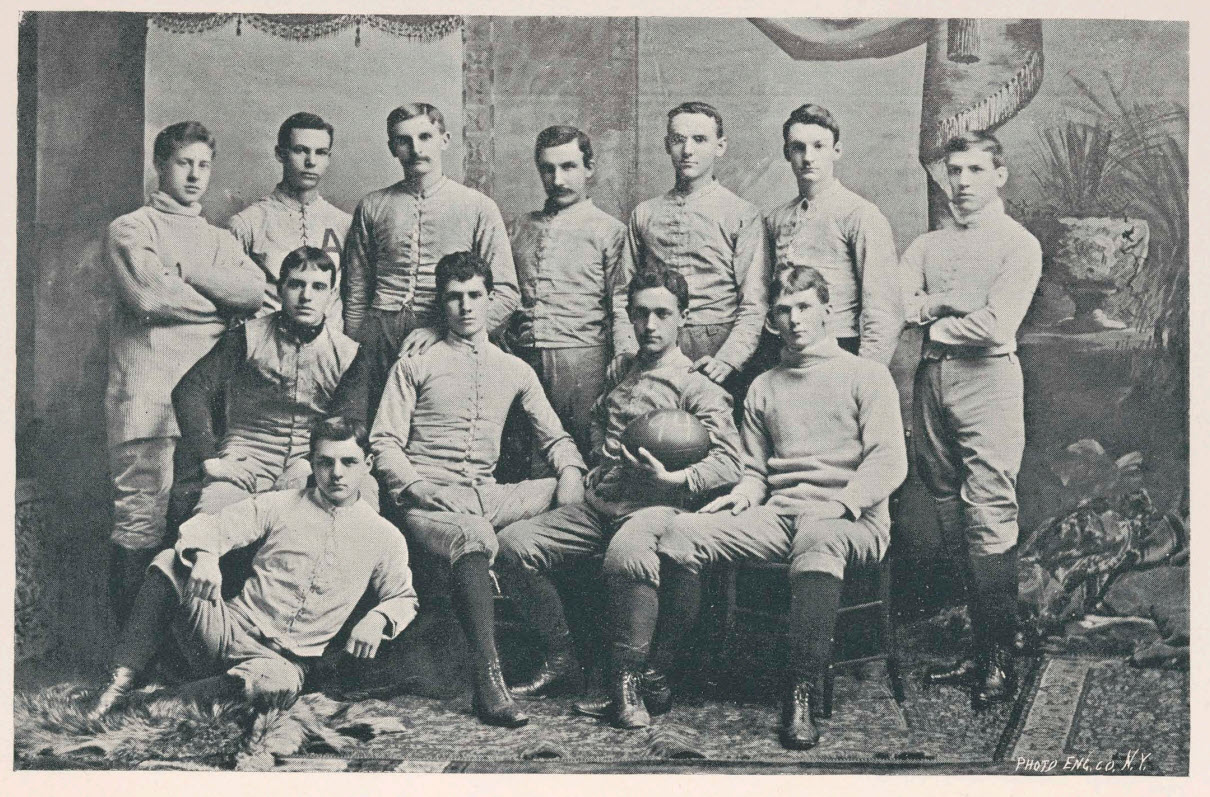
- Conference: Independent
- Record: 0–3
- Head coach: None
- Captain: Charles W. Stage

1890 Midwestern college football independents records
	Conf.			Overall
Team	W	L	T	W		L		T
Nebraska		–		2	–	0	–	0
Washington University		–		2	–	0	–	0
Minnesota		–		5	–	1	–	1
Michigan		–		4	–	1	–	0
Northwestern		–		4	–	1	–	1
Missouri		–		2	–	1	–	0
Cincinnati		–		2	–	1	–	1
Lake Forest		–		5	–	3	–	0
Baker		–		1	–	1	–	0
Iowa		–		1	–	1	–	0
Illinois		–		1	–	2	–	0
Kansas		–		1	–	2	–	0
Ohio Wesleyan		–		1	–	3	–	0
Wisconsin		–		1	–	3	–	0
Ohio State		–		1	–	4	–	0
Doane		–		0	–	1	–	0
Washburn		–		0	–	1	–	0
Western Reserve		–		0	–	3	–	0

The 1890 Western Reserve football team was the first football team fielded by Western Reserve University—now known as Case Western Reserve University—in the American city of Cleveland, Ohio, during the 1890 college football season. The team was also known by the name Adelbert. In its inaugural season, the team was completely shut out by opponents and outscored by a combined 0–82. Some notable players on the team included Billy Stage and Tug Wilson.

== Schedule ==
Date	Opponent	Site	Result
November 4	Clevelands		L 0–6
November 11	Clevelands		L 0–26
November 26	Wooster	Wooster, OH	L 0–50
