= 1890 Ohio State Buckeyes football team =

American college football season

1890 Ohio State Buckeyes football
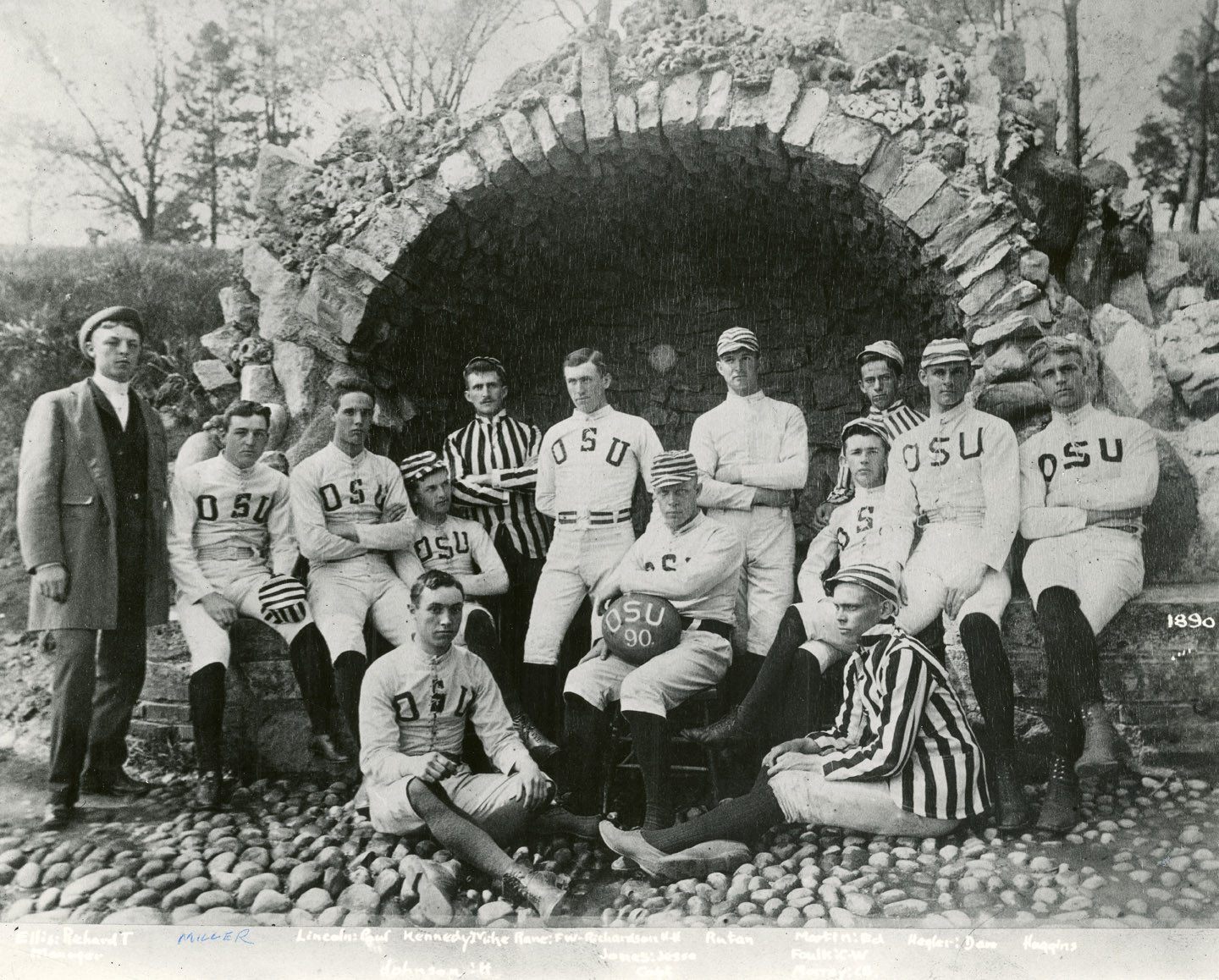
- Conference: Independent
- Record: 1–4
- Head coach: none (spring); Alexander S. Lilley (fall, 1st season)
- Captains: Jesse Lee Jones (spring); Paul Lincoln (fall)
- Home stadium: Recreation Park

1890 Midwestern college football independents records
	Conf.			Overall
Team	W	L	T	W		L		T
Nebraska		–		2	–	0	–	0
Washington University		–		2	–	0	–	0
Minnesota		–		5	–	1	–	1
Michigan		–		4	–	1	–	0
Northwestern		–		4	–	1	–	1
Missouri		–		2	–	1	–	0
Cincinnati		–		2	–	1	–	1
Lake Forest		–		5	–	3	–	0
Baker		–		1	–	1	–	0
Iowa		–		1	–	1	–	0
Illinois		–		1	–	2	–	0
Kansas		–		1	–	2	–	0
Ohio Wesleyan		–		1	–	3	–	0
Wisconsin		–		1	–	3	–	0
Ohio State		–		1	–	4	–	0
Doane		–		0	–	1	–	0
Washburn		–		0	–	1	–	0
Western Reserve		–		0	–	3	–	0

The 1890 Ohio State Buckeyes football team was the first football team fielded by the Ohio State University. It was two distinct teams: one that played a game that spring, and another that played that fall, with a new coach, a new captain, and a significant turnover of team members.

== Schedule ==
Date	Opponent	Site	Result
May 3	at Ohio Wesleyan	Delaware, OH	W 20–14
October 25 (exhibition game)	at Dayton Athletic Club	Dayton Fairgrounds; Dayton, OH	L 0–50
November 1	Wooster	Recreation Park; Columbus, OH	L 0–64
November 15	at Denison	Granville, OH	L 0–14
November 27	Kenyon	Recreation Park; Columbus, OH	L 10–18

== Spring team ==
The organizer and captain of the Ohio State was senior Jesse Lee Jones. Through schoolmate George Cole, Jones ordered a rule book and new ball from the Spalding company in Chicago. Jones played on the team at center. The team did not yet have a coach.

The spring team played their first and only game on May 3, against Ohio Wesleyan. The game had to be played on the campus of Ohio Wesleyan because, at that time, the OWU faculty did not permit their students to play any intercollegiate games off-campus. Ohio State won that game 20–14. In 2008, the Delaware County Historical Society set an historical marker on the site of the game.

The right tackle on the spring team was Herbert Johnston, later the inventor of the electric mixer.

== Fall team ==
After the graduation of Jesse Lee Jones, right guard Paul Lincoln took over as captain and as center. That fall George Cole invited Alexander S. Lilley to serve as coach of the team. Some sources claim that Lilley had also been coach during the spring game, but on May 3, 1890, Lilley had still been 500 miles away at Princeton.

The fall team lost the three intercollegiate games on their schedule, including a 64–0 home defeat to Wooster, as well as an exhibition game against the Dayton Athletic Club. They played their home games at Recreation Park, the site of which now contains an historical marker.

Frederick Douglas Patterson (1871-1932), the first African American player in history of the Ohio State football program, was a member of the fall team. He scored a touchdown in that year's Kenyon game.

Other players on the team were co captains Jesse L Jones and Paul Martyn Lincoln (1870-1944), Hamilton Hutchinson Richardson (1869-1960), Herbert Lincoln Johnston (1869-1938), David Silson Hegler (1869-1959), Hiram Edgar Rutan (1869-1940), W.S. Scott, C.C. Schaeffer, Walter A Landacre (1869-1956), Joseph H Large, Frank W. Rane, Richard T.B. Ellis, Charles Bradfield Morrey (1869-1954), A.P. Bronson, H Beatty, H. J. Whitacre, Romeo Orpheus Keiser (1870-1916), John Buchanan (Jack) Huggins (1871-1901), Charles William Foulk (1869-1958), Walter H. Miller, Arthur H. Kennedy and Edward D. Martin.
