= Alexander S. Lilley =

American football player and coach (1867–1925)

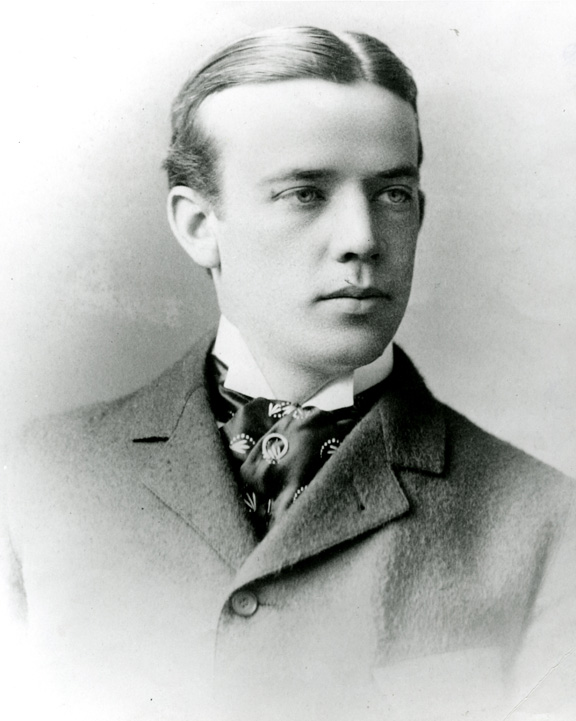
- Lilley pictured in 1890

Biographical details
- Born: December 7, 1867; Columbus, Ohio, U.S.
- Died: December 8, 1925 (aged 58); San Francisco, California, U.S.

Playing career
- c. 1890?: Princeton

Coaching career (HC unless noted)
- 1890–1891: Ohio State
- 1892: Ohio Wesleyan

Head coaching record
- Overall: 4–8

Alexander Spinning Lilley (December 7, 1867 – December 8, 1925) was an American college football coach. He served as the first head football coach at Ohio State University. Lilley was an unpaid volunteer coach during his time coaching at Ohio State. He was also known to ride an Indian pony to practices during his tenure. A plaque at the Ohio State football stadium memorializes him as "A Lone and Ardent Volunteer".

Official records state that Lilley coached the Ohio State team from 1890 to 1891, purportedly compiling a record of 3–5. More recent research establishes that Lilley began coaching in the fall of 1890 and did not coach the first Ohio State game (vs. Ohio Wesleyan) in May 1890.

Lilley died after a five-month illness in 1925. At the time of his death he was a manager for a shipbuilding company in New York.

== Head coaching record ==
Year	Team	Overall	Conference	Standing	Bowl/playoffs
Ohio State Buckeyes (Independent) (1890–1891)
1890	Ohio State	1–3			
1891	Ohio State	2–2			
Ohio State:		3–5			
Ohio Wesleyan (Independent) (1892)
1892	Ohio Wesleyan	1–3			
Ohio Wesleyan:		1–3			
Total:		4–8			
