= 1890–91 Doane Tigers football team =

American college football season

1890 Doane Tigers football
- Conference: Independent
- Record: 0–1
- Head coach: None

1890 Midwestern college football independents records
	Conf.			Overall
Team	W	L	T	W		L		T
Nebraska		–		2	–	0	–	0
Washington University		–		2	–	0	–	0
Minnesota		–		5	–	1	–	1
Michigan		–		4	–	1	–	0
Northwestern		–		4	–	1	–	1
Missouri		–		2	–	1	–	0
Cincinnati		–		2	–	1	–	1
Lake Forest		–		5	–	3	–	0
Baker		–		1	–	1	–	0
Iowa		–		1	–	1	–	0
Illinois		–		1	–	2	–	0
Kansas		–		1	–	2	–	0
Ohio Wesleyan		–		1	–	3	–	0
Wisconsin		–		1	–	3	–	0
Ohio State		–		1	–	4	–	0
Doane		–		0	–	1	–	0
Washburn		–		0	–	1	–	0
Western Reserve		–		0	–	3	–	0

The 1890–91 Doane Tigers football team represented Doane College in the 1890 college football season. Doane's game against Nebraska was the first intercollegiate game of football in the history of the state of Nebraska.

== Schedule ==
Date	Opponent	Site	Result	Source
February 14	Nebraska	Crete, NE	L 0–18	
