= 1951 Central Missouri State vs. Southwestern football game =

The Rejected Touchdown
Central Missouri State Mules	Southwestern Moundbuilders
(0–0)	(0–0)
6	6
Head coach: Tate C. Page	Head coach: Harold Hunt
	1	2	3	4	Total
Central Missouri State	0	0	0	6	6
Southwestern	0	0	0	6	6
- Date: September 14, 1951
- Season: 1951
- Stadium: Sonner Stadium
- Location: Winfield, Kansas
- Attendance: 2,000

The 1951 Central Missouri State vs. Southwestern football game was a college football game between the Central Missouri State Mules and the Southwestern Moundbuilders played on September 14, 1951. The game was played at Sonner Stadium in Winfield, Kansas. The game is known for a team rejecting a touchdown awarded by the game officials.

Central Missouri's head coach Tate C. Page called it "the finest act of sportsmanship" that he ever saw. In the third quarter, Southwestern halfback Arthur Johnson completed a long run down the sidelines nearest Southwestern's bench. The referee signalled a touchdown and the crowd of 2,000 went wild with enthusiasm.

Southwestern's head coach Harold Hunt ran out on the field to shout, "Southwestern rejects the touchdown!" He then informed the officials that Johnson had stepped out of bounds, nullifying the touchdown. Not a single one of the referees had been in a position to see him do so, but they agreed to nullify the touchdown and returned the ball to the point where Coach Hunt said Johnson had stepped out. A photo of the run later confirmed Coach Hunt's observation and it was published in the Winfield Daily Courier.

Referee W. P. Astle noted that there had been only three officials at the game instead of the regulation four. He later said, "If the fourth official had been present to cover what was impossible for me to cover ... I would never have discovered the ‘biggest’ man I ever met."

Southwestern's Hunt was nominated for "Football's Man of the Year" by This Week magazine because of this display of sportsmanship.

== See also ==
- Timeline of college football in Kansas
