= A. L. McRae =

American football player and coach

Biographical details
- Born: October 25, 1861; McRae, Georgia, U.S.
- Died: March 18, 1922 (aged 60); Rolla, Missouri, U.S.

Playing career
- 1893: Missouri Mines

Coaching career (HC unless noted)
- 1890: Missouri
- 1893–1899: Missouri Mines

Head coaching record
- Overall: 4–8

Austin Lee McRae (October 25, 1861 – March 18, 1922) was an American college football coach, physics professor, and university director. He served as the head football coach at the University of Missouri for their inaugural season in 1890 and at the Missouri School of Mines and Metallurgy—now Missouri University of Science and Technology— in Rolla, Missouri, from 1893 to 1899, compiling a career college football coaching record of 4–8. McRae taught physics at the Missouri School of Mines from 1891 to 1894, then at the University of Texas until 1896. After work as a consulting engineer in St. Louis, McRae returned to Missouri Mines in 1899 and was the director of the school from 1915 to 1920.

McRae was grand high priest of the Royal Arch Masons in Missouri. He died on March 18, 1922, at his home in Rolla.

== Head coaching record ==
Year	Team	Overall	Conference	Standing	Bowl/playoffs
Missouri Tigers (Independent) (1890)
1890	Missouri	2–1			
Missouri:		2–1			
Missouri Mines Miners (Independent) (1893–1899)
1893	Missouri Mines	0–1			
1894	Missouri Mines	1–0			
1895	Missouri Mines	0–2			
1896	Missouri Mines	0–1			
1897	No team				
1898	Missouri Mines	1–1			
1899	Missouri Mines	0–2			
Missouri Mines:		2–7			
Total:		4–8			
