= Roger Sherman (American football) =

American football player, coach and lawyer (1872–1957)

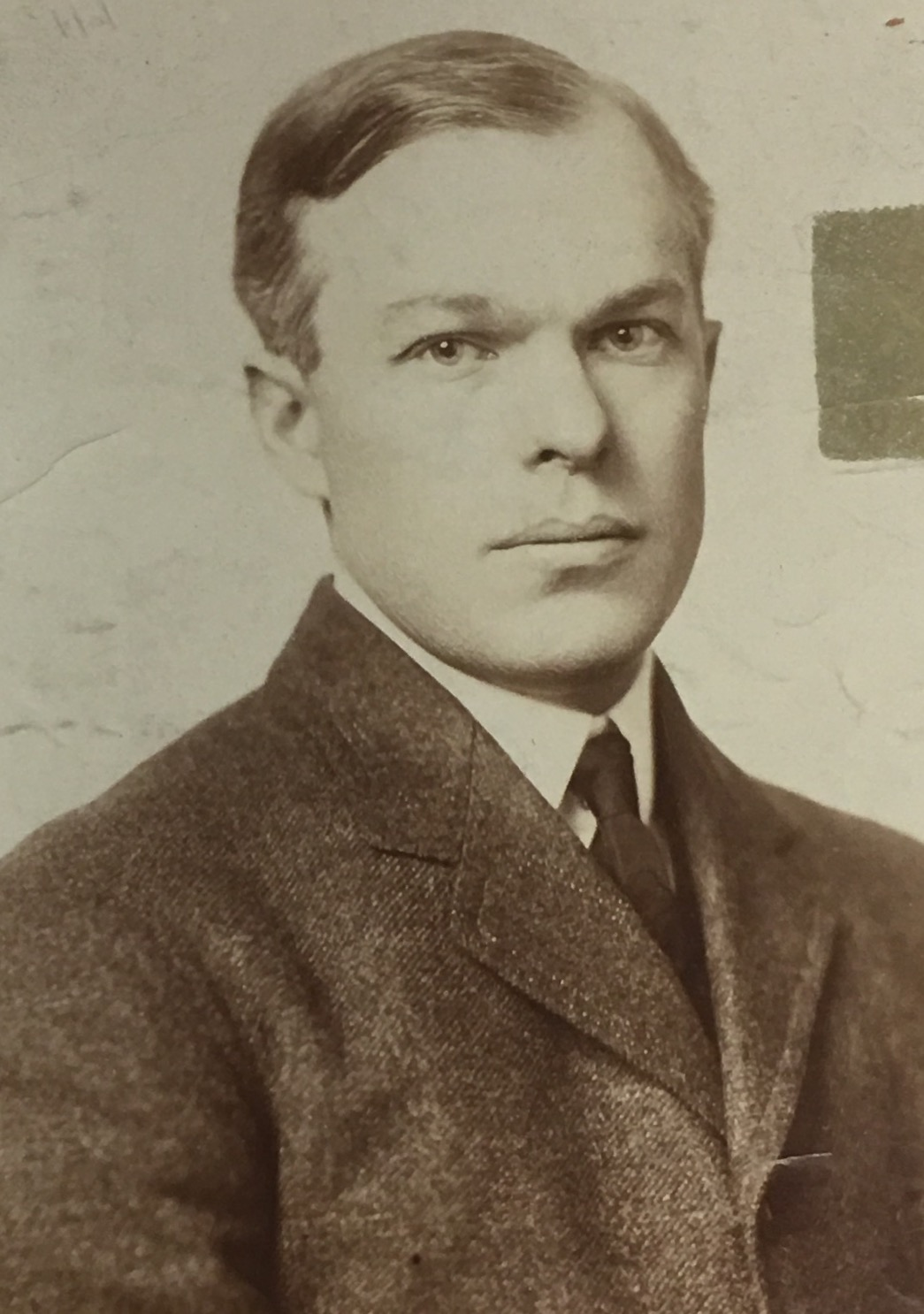

Biographical details
- Born: January 4, 1872; Chicago, Illinois, U.S.
- Died: January 20, 1957 (aged 85); Pompano Beach, Florida, U.S.

Playing career
- 1890–1893: Michigan
- Positions: Quarterback, end

Coaching career (HC unless noted)
- 1894: Iowa

Head coaching record
- Overall: 4–4–1

Roger Sherman (January 4, 1872 – January 20, 1957) was an American college football player, coach and lawyer. He played college football for the University of Michigan from 1890 to 1893 and coached the University of Iowa football team in 1894. In late 1895, he was implicated in a series of articles by Caspar Whitney alleging that the schools of the Western Conference had been corrupted by "professionalism" involving the payment of money to athletes for their services in playing football. Sherman practiced law in Chicago, Illinois, and served as a master of chancery of the Superior Court and president of the Chicago Bar Association and Illinois State Bar Association.

== Biography ==
=== Early years ===
Sherman was born in Chicago, Illinois, in 1872 and attended Chicago's Hyde Park High School. He played two years of football for Hyde Park in the Cook County High School League. He was captain of a Hyde Park team that "was never defeated and won the pennant."

=== Michigan ===
Sherman enrolled at the University of Michigan, where he played at the quarterback and end positions for the Michigan Wolverines football team in 1890, 1891 and 1893. At 5 feet, 7 inches, he was the shortest player on the Michigan team. In November 1891, the Chicago Daily Tribune wrote: "Sherman at quarter back, although not a swift passer, is cool-headed and is nearly always to be found near the ball."

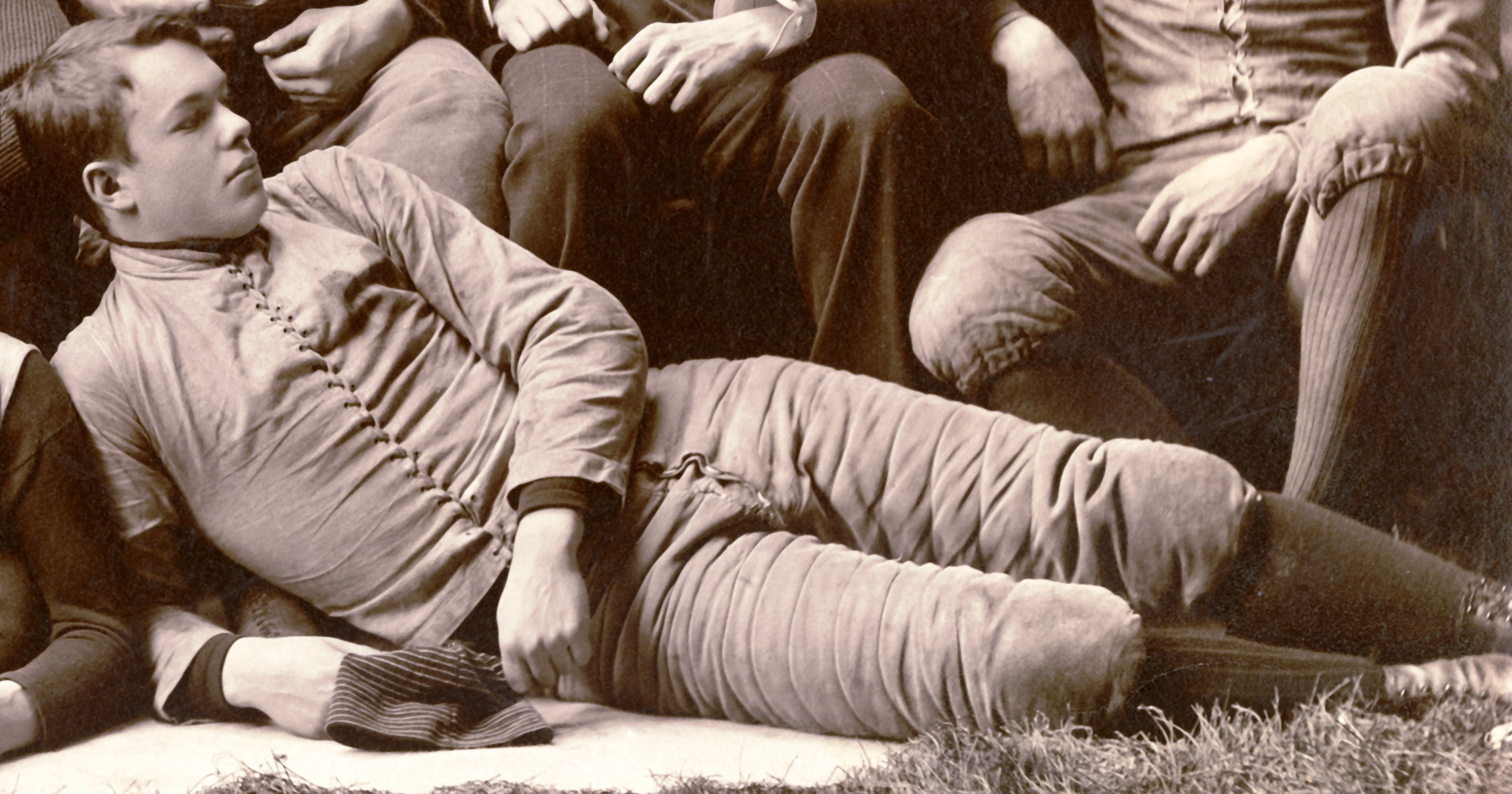
Sherman cropped from the 1890 Michigan team photograph

While attending the University of Michigan, Sherman was also a member of the school's banjo club. In April 1892, Sherman performed with Michigan's banjo and glee clubs at Chicago's Central Music Hall. At the time, the Chicago Daily Tribune reported: "Sherman is equally handy at football or at a banjo, but, as the former game is out of season, it is reasonable to suppose that his present efforts in Chicago will be confined to music."

Sherman completed five years' of study in four years, earning a bachelor's degree in 1894 while simultaneously completing the first year of law school.

=== Iowa ===
In 1894, Sherman was hired as the head football coach at the University of Iowa. One of Sherman's players, Michael L. McKinley, recalled: "In 1894 the athletic committee made arrangements with Roger Sherman, a famous Michigan end, to coach the team for the fall season." Sherman coached the entire team at Iowa—line, ends and backs. He led the Hawkeyes to a 4–4–1 record in his one year as head coach.

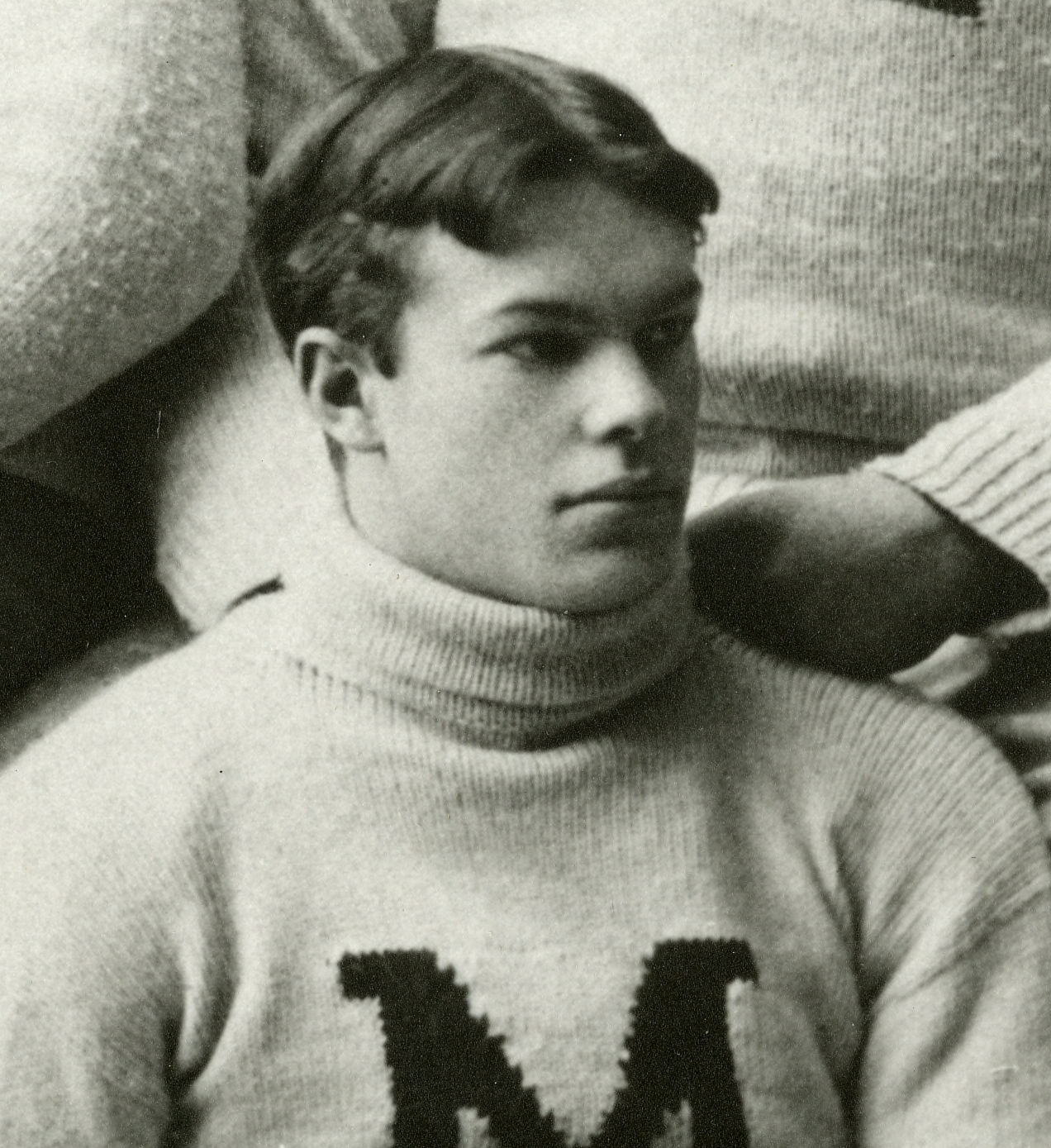
Sherman from the 1891 Michigan team photograph

=== 1895 recruiting scandal ===
In the fall of 1895, Caspar Whitney wrote a series of articles in Harper's Weekly contending that "professionalism" had corrupted collegiate athletics among the Western Conference schools, including Wisconsin, Northwestern, Minnesota and Michigan. One of Whitney's accusations was that Sherman, who he described as "Michigan's manager," had on October 6, 1895, while riding on a Chicago cable car, offered Chicago Athletic Association player Archibald Stevenson the sum of $600 to finish the season with the Michigan team. Sherman denied Whitney's charge in an interview with the Chicago Daily Tribune:

Stevenson had said he expected to go to Michigan to take a law course, and it was naturally expected he would join the team. When the Michigan team went into training at Omena early in the season, it was expected Stevenson would join the team, and when it was learned he would play for the athletic association Baird, the manager, wrote to me to see him and find out if he was coming to Michigan. I went to the Athletic club to see him and met him starting for a game at the Athletic Association field. I got on the car and rode with him and had a talk with him. I wanted to know if he was going to Michigan, as they had expected him. I made him no offer and held out no inducements to him, as I had no authority to do so, even had I wanted to, from Baird or any one else.

Michigan supporters denied Whitney's charges and, as proof that Whitney's account was wild and unreliable, noted that he had erroneously identified Sherman as Michigan's manager. Whitney stood his ground and explained:

As to Stevenson, I have charged he was offered $600 by Roger Sherman, as manager of the Michigan team, to play with that eleven. I erred in an immaterial detail, which Michigan men have seized upon in order to dodge the issue. They deny that he made such an offer, or that he was manager of the eleven. The facts are as follows: Sherman managed the summer trip and training of the team at Omena, a summer resort on Traverse Bay, Michigan. Charles Baird was the regular manager, and was the one who originally conducted the negotiations with Stevenson, which Sherman knew about and talked over with Stevenson in the Chicago cable car Oct. 5, 1895. Mr. Sherman admitted this to me before a witness in Chicago Dec. 17, 1895. Mr. Sherman is a young lawyer of excellent repute and will not deny this statement. Besides, Stevenson has admitted it.

Later, Sherman responded by challenging the assertion that matters were purer in the East and with a pragmatic defense of professionalism as "an evil, but not an unmixed evil," and "a bad means to a good end." In an essay published by The Inlander, Sherman wrote:

In order to get the support of the college body and the public in general a team must first win at almost any cost. Students will not support a losing team be it ever so pure, nor will the public pay to see such a team play ball. ... To declare for purity at the outset means a weak team and, as a consequence, defeat and lack of support, moral and financial, for years to come, maybe for ever. The power that a manager has to help men through college, if judiciously exercised, is productive of a great deal of good. Many of the best players are in the neediest of circumstances. It is only right that they should be helped through college in return for their sacrifices on the football field. ... The actual facts in this case are these: The most successful teams in the country today have built up their reputations and their successes by the judicious expenditure of money in securing the services of good players. That nearly all of them cling to this practice is well known to those who are in the possession of the true state of facts.

=== Legal career ===
Sherman enrolled at the Northwestern University School of Law and received a Bachelor of Laws degree in 1895. He began the practice of law in Chicago with his father, Penoyer L. Sherman, a master in the chancery court. In 1897, he practiced law with two other attorneys in the firm of Church, McMurdy & Sherman. Sherman was active in politics in Chicago's Sixth Ward and was appointed master in chancery of the Superior Court in 1906. He served as a chancery master from 1906 to 1907 and as the Assistant State's Attorney in Chicago from 1907 to 1908. As of 1918, he was in private practice as one of three partners in the firm of Tenney, Harding & Sherman.

He later served as the president of the Chicago Bar Association (1922–1923) and president of the Illinois State Bar Association (1923–1924). He continued in private practice for many years thereafter with the firm of Tenney, Sherman, Rogers & Guthrie.

=== Later years ===
In his later years, Sherman lived at 213 Linden Street in Winnetka, Illinois. He also had a winter home in Pompano Beach, Florida. In 1957, Sherman died at age 85 at his winter home in Pompano Beach. He was survived by his wife, the former Grace Buttolph, and two daughters, Mrs. Philip M. Watrous and Mrs. Robert K. Vincent.

== Head coaching record ==
Year	Team	Overall	Conference	Standing	Bowl/playoffs
Iowa Hawkeyes (Western Interstate University Football Association) (1894)
1894	Iowa	4–4–1	1–2	T–3rd	
Iowa:		4–4–1	1–2		
Total:		4–4–1			
