= 1890 Washburn Ichabods football team =

American college football season

1890 Washburn Ichabods football
- Conference: Independent
- Record: 0–1

1890 Midwestern college football independents records
	Conf.			Overall
Team	W	L	T	W		L		T
Nebraska		–		2	–	0	–	0
Washington University		–		2	–	0	–	0
Minnesota		–		5	–	1	–	1
Michigan		–		4	–	1	–	0
Northwestern		–		4	–	1	–	1
Missouri		–		2	–	1	–	0
Cincinnati		–		2	–	1	–	1
Lake Forest		–		5	–	3	–	0
Baker		–		1	–	1	–	0
Iowa		–		1	–	1	–	0
Illinois		–		1	–	2	–	0
Kansas		–		1	–	2	–	0
Ohio Wesleyan		–		1	–	3	–	0
Wisconsin		–		1	–	3	–	0
Ohio State		–		1	–	4	–	0
Doane		–		0	–	1	–	0
Washburn		–		0	–	1	–	0
Western Reserve		–		0	–	3	–	0

The 1890 Washburn Ichabods football team represented Washburn College—now known as Washburn University—as an independent during the 1890 college football season. In their first season of football, the Ichabods lost their only game.

== Schedule ==
Date	Time	Opponent	Site	Result	Attendance	Source
November 28	3:00 p.m.	Baker	Washburn grounds; Topeka, KS	L 0–32	200–300	
