= 1890 Iowa Hawkeyes football team =

American college football season

1890 Iowa Hawkeyes football
- Conference: Independent
- Record: 1–1
- Head coach: None
- Home stadium: Iowa Field

1890 Midwestern college football independents records
| | Conf. | | | Overall |
| Team | W | L | T | W | | L | | T |
|---|---|---|---|---|---|---|---|---|
| Nebraska | | – | | 2 | – | 0 | – | 0 |
| Washington University | | – | | 2 | – | 0 | – | 0 |
| Minnesota | | – | | 5 | – | 1 | – | 1 |
| Michigan | | – | | 4 | – | 1 | – | 0 |
| Northwestern | | – | | 4 | – | 1 | – | 1 |
| Missouri | | – | | 2 | – | 1 | – | 0 |
| Cincinnati | | – | | 2 | – | 1 | – | 1 |
| Lake Forest | | – | | 5 | – | 3 | – | 0 |
| Baker | | – | | 1 | – | 1 | – | 0 |
| Iowa | | – | | 1 | – | 1 | – | 0 |
| Illinois | | – | | 1 | – | 2 | – | 0 |
| Kansas | | – | | 1 | – | 2 | – | 0 |
| Ohio Wesleyan | | – | | 1 | – | 3 | – | 0 |
| Wisconsin | | – | | 1 | – | 3 | – | 0 |
| Ohio State | | – | | 1 | – | 4 | – | 0 |
| Doane | | – | | 0 | – | 1 | – | 0 |
| Washburn | | – | | 0 | – | 1 | – | 0 |
| Western Reserve | | – | | 0 | – | 3 | – | 0 |

The 1890 Iowa Hawkeyes football team represented the State University of Iowa ("S.U.I."), now commonly known as the University of Iowa, during the 1890 college football season. Following Iowa's inaugural season in 1889, two games were scheduled for the Hawkeyes to play in 1890. On October 18, the Hawkeyes played Iowa College in Iowa City, only to lose to the Pioneers for the second time in two games. It was this loss that triggered a dispute amongst people within the university. In an attempt to prove that the best football talent was not on the team, the S.U.I. Medics challenged the varsity squad to a game. Confident, the varsity squad accepted, and lost, 22–10. But the loss did not keep Iowa from challenging Iowa Wesleyan, who accepted, under the terms that the game be played in Mount Pleasant, Iowa.

Fifteen hundred fans, including John Marshall Harlan and Robert Todd Lincoln, were in attendance for the Thanksgiving Day game. Using rules that made touchdowns worth four points, the Hawkeyes easily won the game in a rout, 91–0. The Hawkeyes scored 19 touchdowns and five goals after touchdown while A.G. Smith kicked the first field goal in school history. Today, 19 touchdowns remains an Iowa single-game record, and the 91 points remains Iowa's third-largest margin of victory in school history.

== Schedule ==
| Date | Opponent | Site | Result |
|---|---|---|---|
| October 18 | Iowa College | Iowa Field; Iowa City, IA | L 6–11 |
| October 18 | Iowa Medical | Iowa Field; Iowa City, IA | L 10–22^{†} |
| November 27 | at Iowa Wesleyan | Fairgrounds Park; Mount Pleasant, IA | W 91–0 |

^{†} Did not count against Iowa's record.

== Players ==
- Michael Balliet
- William Bremner
- Arthur Cox
- James Crossley
- F.H. Cutler
- Lloyd Elliott
- Albert Heald
- David Knapp
- Matthew McEniry
- Fred Neal
- Frank Pierce
- Milton Powers
- Martin Sampson
- Allen Sanford
- Charles Smeltzer
- Arthur Smith, quarterback and captain
