= Tate C. Page =

American football player and coach (1908–1984)

Biographical details
- Born: January 6, 1908; Muskogee, Oklahoma, U.S.
- Died: May 19, 1984 (aged 76); Atkins, Arkansas, U.S.

Playing career
- 1927–1929: Arkansas Tech
- 1933: Tulane
- Positions: Guard, tackle

Coaching career (HC unless noted)
- 1936–1937: Transylvania (line)
- 1938–1941: Transylvania
- 1944: Tulane (line)
- 1947: Auburn (assistant)
- 1948–1951: Central Missouri State

Administrative career (AD unless noted)
- 1948–1953: Central Missouri State

Head coaching record
- Overall: 23–43–5
- Bowls: 1–0

Tate Cromwell "Piney" Page (January 6, 1908 – May 19, 1984) was an American college football player and coach. He served as the head football coach at Transylvania University in Lexington, Kentucky from 1938 to 1941 and at Central Missouri State College—now known as the University of Central Missouri—from 1948 to 1951, compiling a career college football coaching record of 23–43–5. Page was the head coach for Central Missouri State during the famous 1951 Central Missouri State vs. Southwestern football game in which a team rejected a touchdown awarded by the game officials. He was later dean of the College of Education at Western Kentucky University. Page graduated from Arkansas Tech University in 1930 and was a football letter-winner at Tulane University in 1933.

== Head coaching record ==
Year	Team	Overall	Conference	Standing	Bowl/playoffs
Transylvania Pioneers (Southern Intercollegiate Athletic Association) (1938–1941)
1938	Transylvania	3–5	2–4	T–20th	
1939	Transylvania	1–8	0–7	32nd	
1940	Transylvania	5–3–1	1–2–1	T–19th	
1941	Transylvania	3–5	1–3	T–23rd	
Transylvania:		12–21–1	4–16–1		
Central Missouri State Mules (Missouri Intercollegiate Athletic Association) (1948–1951)
1948	Central Missouri State	0–7–2	0–4–1	6th	
1949	Central Missouri State	3–5	2–3	4th	
1950	Central Missouri State	8–3	3–2	3rd	W Shrine Bowl
1951	Central Missouri State	0–7–2	0–4–1	T–5th	
Central Missouri State:		11–22–4	5–13–2		
Total:		23–43–5			
