= 1890 Northwestern Purple football team =

American college football season

1890 Northwestern Purple football
- Conference: Independent
- Record: 4–1–1
- Head coach: None
- Captain: Thomas Moulding

1890 Midwestern college football independents records
	Conf.			Overall
Team	W	L	T	W		L		T
Nebraska		–		2	–	0	–	0
Washington University		–		2	–	0	–	0
Minnesota		–		5	–	1	–	1
Michigan		–		4	–	1	–	0
Northwestern		–		4	–	1	–	1
Missouri		–		2	–	1	–	0
Cincinnati		–		2	–	1	–	1
Lake Forest		–		5	–	3	–	0
Baker		–		1	–	1	–	0
Iowa		–		1	–	1	–	0
Illinois		–		1	–	2	–	0
Kansas		–		1	–	2	–	0
Ohio Wesleyan		–		1	–	3	–	0
Wisconsin		–		1	–	3	–	0
Ohio State		–		1	–	4	–	0
Doane		–		0	–	1	–	0
Washburn		–		0	–	1	–	0
Western Reserve		–		0	–	3	–	0

The 1890 Northwestern Purple football team was an American football team that represented Northwestern University during the 1890 college football season. The team compiled a 4–1–1 record. Only two of the seven games were intercollegiate games, a 22–6 victory over Beloit College on November 22, 1890, in Evanston, and a 22–10 victory over Wisconsin on November 27, 1890, in Milwaukee. The game against Wisconsin was the first between Northwestern and another of the teams that would later organize the Big Ten Conference.

== Schedule ==
Date	Time	Opponent	Site	Result	Attendance	Source
October 10		Evanston High School	Evanston, IL	W 16–4		
October 22		Evanston High School	Evanston, IL	W 18–0		
October 30		South Division High School	Evanston, IL	T 0–0		
November 1	4:00 p.m.	at Chicago University Club	West Side Park; Chicago, IL	L 6–26		
November 22		Beloit	Northwestern campus; Evanston, IL	W 22–6	600	
November 26		vs. Wisconsin	Milwaukee, WI	W 22–10	800–1,000	
