= Ted Mestre =

American football coach

Coaching career (HC unless noted)
- 1890: Wisconsin

Head coaching record
- Overall: 1–3

Ted Mestre was an American college football coach who, in 1890, obtained the first win for the University of Wisconsin football team. He was their second head football coach, for a single season, compiling a record of 1–3. He was an alumnus of Yale University.

== Head coaching record ==
Year	Team	Overall	Conference	Standing	Bowl/playoffs
Wisconsin Badgers (Independent) (1890)
1890	Wisconsin	1–3			
Wisconsin:		1–3			
Total:		1–3			
