= 1890 Wisconsin Badgers football team =

American college football season

1890 Wisconsin Badgers football
- Conference: Independent
- Record: 1–3
- Head coach: Ted Mestre (1st season)
- Captain: James Kerr
- Home stadium: Randall Field

1890 Midwestern college football independents records
	Conf.			Overall
Team	W	L	T	W		L		T
Nebraska		–		2	–	0	–	0
Washington University		–		2	–	0	–	0
Minnesota		–		5	–	1	–	1
Michigan		–		4	–	1	–	0
Northwestern		–		4	–	1	–	1
Missouri		–		2	–	1	–	0
Cincinnati		–		2	–	1	–	1
Lake Forest		–		5	–	3	–	0
Baker		–		1	–	1	–	0
Iowa		–		1	–	1	–	0
Illinois		–		1	–	2	–	0
Kansas		–		1	–	2	–	0
Ohio Wesleyan		–		1	–	3	–	0
Wisconsin		–		1	–	3	–	0
Ohio State		–		1	–	4	–	0
Doane		–		0	–	1	–	0
Washburn		–		0	–	1	–	0
Western Reserve		–		0	–	3	–	0

The 1890 Wisconsin Badgers football team represented the University of Wisconsin as an independent during the 1890 college football season. Led by Ted Mestre in his first and only season as head coach, the Badgers compiled a record of 1–3. The team's captain was James Kerr.

This season marked the largest margin of victory in Wisconsin Badgers football history, a 106–0 win to open the season against Whitewater Normal. In the second game of the season, the Badgers lost 63–0 to Minnesota, a first game played in the Minnesota–Wisconsin football rivalry, one of the most played college football rivalries.

== Schedule ==
Date	Opponent	Site	Result	Attendance	Source
November 1	Whitewater Normal	Randall Field; Madison, WI	W 106–0		
November 15	at Minnesota	Minneapolis, MN (rivalry)	L 0–63	800	
November 22	Lake Forest	Randall Field; Madison, WI	L 6–16		
November 26	vs. Northwestern	Athletic Park; Milwaukee, WI	L 10–22	800–1,000	
