= George S. Holden =

American football player and manufacturer (1868–1935)

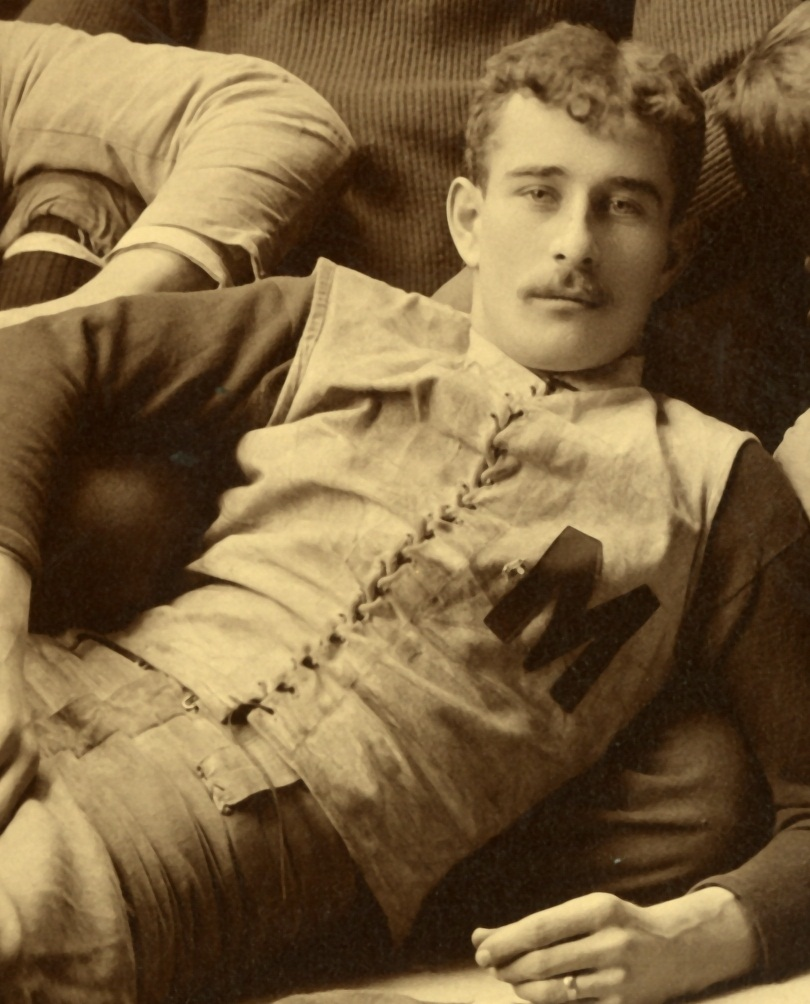
- Photograph of Holden cropped from 1890 Michigan team photograph
- Born: September 29, 1868; Middlefield, Massachusetts, United States
- Died: July 9, 1935 (aged 66); Palmer, Massachusetts, United States
- Education: Amherst College, University of Michigan
- Known for: Football player/Woolen manufacturer

George Steadman Holden (September 29, 1868 – July 9, 1935) was an American football player and manufacturer.

Holden was born in Middlefield, Massachusetts, in 1868. He was the son of Henry Parker and Mary A. (Holmes) Holden. He moved to Palmer, Massachusetts, in 1871 when his father purchased interests in several local businesses. Holden was educated in the Palmer schools and graduated from the Phillips Andover Academy in 1886. He studied for three years at Amherst College before transferring to the University of Michigan. He played college football and was the starting quarterback for the 1890 Michigan Wolverines football team. Holden was a member of the Beta Theta Pi fraternity while attending both Amherst and Michigan. He graduated from Michigan in 1891. In March 1896, he married Katherine Cramer of Ann Arbor, Michigan. They had three children, Roger Cramer Holden, Philip Holmes Holden, and Henry Parker Holden. He worked in the woolen business in Palmer, Massachusetts, and became the superintendent of the Palmer Woolen Mill in 1895 and the financial manager starting in 1900. In July 1935, Holden died at his home in Palmer.

== See also ==
- 1890 Michigan Wolverines football team
