= Will Coleman (American football) =

American college football player and coach

- Coleman in his 1893 KU football photograph

Biographical details
- Born: March 8, 1869; Kentucky, U.S.
- Died: September 2, 1934 (aged 65); Overland Park, Kansas, U.S.

Playing career
- 1890–1894: Kansas
- Position: Center

Coaching career (HC unless noted)
- 1890: Kansas

Head coaching record
- Overall: 1–2

William Julius Coleman (March 8, 1869 – September 2, 1934) was an American college football player and coach, as well as a collegiate rower and track and field athlete. He was the first coach for the Kansas football team, when he served as a player-coach in 1890. He also competed on the KU rowing team, winning the 1 mile 2 man rowing competition along with Charles Orton Lasley in 1892 with a time of 6:04. Coleman was a track and field athlete at Kansas as well. He ran both the 100-yard dash and the mile, coming in second in the 100-yard dash and first in the mile with a time of 5 minutes and 19.5 seconds at the 1892 official KU Field Day.

== Early life and playing career ==
Coleman was born in 1869 in Kentucky to Leonidas William Coleman (July 20, 1842 – 1929) and Fena Coleman. At the age of one his family moved from Kentucky to rural Chase County, Kansas just outside Strong City where he went on to become an athletic star at Chase County high school in Cottonwood Falls, Kansas. After graduating from Chase County high school he attended the University of Kansas in Lawrence, Kansas where he played football from 1890 through 1894. He was the starting center and lettered all five years he was at KU.

For several years during Coleman's time at Kansas, KU ran what was known as the Flying V formation on offense where the center, Will's position, is the point of the "V" leading the way for the ball carrier and other blockers and takes the brunt of the punishment from defensive players. This formation proved so dangerous and lead to so many severe injuries that it was later banned in both collegiate and pro football.

== Coaching career ==
Coleman coached the Jayhawks in what is widely considered the first college football game played in the state of Kansas. He served as the first head coach for the Kansas football team, coaching for a single season in 1890 and tallying a mark of 1–2. The team actually went 2–1 on the field, but their last game against Baker University, which was initially won by KU with a score of 14 to 12, was awarded to Baker on a technicality.

The 1890 Kansas Jayhawks football team was not officially associated with the University of Kansas. Coleman was not an employee or a faculty member of the University of Kansas, but instead a KU student who played center on the football team. The first Jayhawks football coach recognized by the University of Kansas was faculty member Edwin Mortimer Hopkins, who helmed the team the next season in 1891.

== Later life and death ==
Coleman met his wife while attending KU. They later married in 1895 upon his graduation from the University of Kansas. They had one child, a daughter.

Will's first job after college was as the superintendent of Haskell Indian Nations University, also located in Lawrence, Kansas. He held this job for more than 15 years before changing careers and becoming a traveling salesman in 1910. In 1918 he moved his family to Kansas City, Missouri until later moving to Mission, Kansas and then Overland Park, Kansas where he eventually died in 1934.

== Head coaching record ==
Year	Team	Overall	Conference	Standing	Bowl/playoffs
Kansas Jayhawks (Kansas Intercollegiate Athletic Association) (1890)
1890	Kansas	1–2			
Kansas:		1–2			
Total:		1–2			
