= 1890 Illinois Fighting Illini football team =

American college football season

1890 Illinois Fighting Illini football
- Conference: Independent
- Record: 1–2
- Head coach: Scott Williams (1st season)
- Captain: Scott Williams
- Home stadium: Illinois Field

1890 Midwestern college football independents records
	Conf.			Overall
Team	W	L	T	W		L		T
Nebraska		–		2	–	0	–	0
Washington University		–		2	–	0	–	0
Minnesota		–		5	–	1	–	1
Michigan		–		4	–	1	–	0
Northwestern		–		4	–	1	–	1
Missouri		–		2	–	1	–	0
Cincinnati		–		2	–	1	–	1
Lake Forest		–		5	–	3	–	0
Baker		–		1	–	1	–	0
Iowa		–		1	–	1	–	0
Illinois		–		1	–	2	–	0
Kansas		–		1	–	2	–	0
Ohio Wesleyan		–		1	–	3	–	0
Wisconsin		–		1	–	3	–	0
Ohio State		–		1	–	4	–	0
Doane		–		0	–	1	–	0
Washburn		–		0	–	1	–	0
Western Reserve		–		0	–	3	–	0

The 1890 Illinois Fighting Illini football team was an American football team that represented the University of Illinois during the 1890 college football season. The team was first fielded at the University of Illinois. Coached, captained and quarterbacked by Scott Williams, the team was not affiliated with a conference and compiled a 1–2 record.

== Schedule ==
Date	Opponent	Site	Result	Source
October 2	at Illinois Wesleyan	Bloomington, IL	L 0–16	
November 22	at Purdue	Stuart Field; West Lafayette, IN (rivalry)	L 0–62	
November 30	Illinois Wesleyan	Illinois Field; Champaign, IL	W 12–6	

== Roster ==
- Bowen, Herbert L. LE
- Butler, William T. RR
- Clarke, Edwin B. RE
- Clarke, Frederick W. RG
- Cook, James W. LE
- Daughmer, F.U. LG
- Furber, William A. LT
- Gates, Andrew W. RG
- Hart, Ralph W. LT
- Higgins, Albert G. FB
- Huff, George A. CR
- McCartney, W.P. LR
- Pillsbury, Arthur L. HB
- Shattuck, Walt SB
- Slater, William F. HB
- Steele, James RT
- Williams, Scott QB (capt)
- Wright, Royal RT
