= 1890 Minnesota Golden Gophers football team =

American college football season

1890 Minnesota Golden Gophers football
- Conference: Independent
- Record: 5–1–1
- Head coach: Tom Eck (1st season)
- Captain: Horace R. Robinson

1890 Midwestern college football independents records
	Conf.			Overall
Team	W	L	T	W		L		T
Nebraska		–		2	–	0	–	0
Washington University		–		2	–	0	–	0
Minnesota		–		5	–	1	–	1
Michigan		–		4	–	1	–	0
Northwestern		–		4	–	1	–	1
Missouri		–		2	–	1	–	0
Cincinnati		–		2	–	1	–	1
Lake Forest		–		5	–	3	–	0
Baker		–		1	–	1	–	0
Iowa		–		1	–	1	–	0
Illinois		–		1	–	2	–	0
Kansas		–		1	–	2	–	0
Ohio Wesleyan		–		1	–	3	–	0
Wisconsin		–		1	–	3	–	0
Ohio State		–		1	–	4	–	0
Doane		–		0	–	1	–	0
Washburn		–		0	–	1	–	0
Western Reserve		–		0	–	3	–	0

The 1890 Minnesota Golden Gophers football team represented the University of Minnesota as an independent in the 1890 college football season. It was the only season under head coach Tom Eck and featured the historic first meeting between Minnesota and Wisconsin, the most-played rivalry at the top level of NCAA college football. The two teams have played each other every year since then except for 1906. That game was canceled by President Theodore Roosevelt who had decided to "cool off heated college football rivalries because of injuries and deaths on the field." The game was a decisive 63–0 Minnesota win.

Coach Eck started holding signal drills before each game and established a training table. This is considered to be the start of "scientific football" at Minnesota. He also acted as the team's trainer.

The week before that game, Minnesota took on Grinnell in Minneapolis, the first out-of-state opponent in Minnesota football history. The game was a hard-fought 18–13 Minnesota victory.

The Ariel declared this team to be the "champions of the northwest".

== Schedule ==
Date	Time	Opponent	Site	Result	Attendance	Source
October 27		at Hamline	St. Paul, MN	W 44–0		
November 3		at Shattuck	Faribault, MN	W 58–0		
November 5		Minnesotas	Athletic Park; Minneapolis, MN	T 0–0		
November 8	3:00 p.m.	Grinnell	Minneapolis, MN	W 18–13	300	
November 15		Wisconsin	Minneapolis, MN (rivalry)	W 63–0	800	
November 19		Ex-Collegiates	Athletic Park; Minneapolis, MN	L 11–14	1,500	
November 29		Ex-Collegiates	Minneapolis, MN	W 14–6	1,200	
All times are in Central time

== Roster ==
Horace R. Robinson (captain), William C. Leary, George K. Belden, J.A. Harris, S.S. Start, Grant B. Rossman, Eugene L. Patterson, William C. Muir, George C. Sikes, Alf F. Pillsbury, Harry E. White, Charles E. Guthrie, James E. Madigan, David R. Burbank, Everhard P. Harding; Trainer Tom Eck.
