= 1890 Lake Forest Foresters football team =

American college football season

1890 Lake Forest Foresters football
- Conference: Independent
- Record: 5–3
- Head coach: None

1890 Midwestern college football independents records
	Conf.			Overall
Team	W	L	T	W		L		T
Nebraska		–		2	–	0	–	0
Washington University		–		2	–	0	–	0
Minnesota		–		5	–	1	–	1
Michigan		–		4	–	1	–	0
Northwestern		–		4	–	1	–	1
Missouri		–		2	–	1	–	0
Cincinnati		–		2	–	1	–	1
Lake Forest		–		5	–	3	–	0
Baker		–		1	–	1	–	0
Iowa		–		1	–	1	–	0
Illinois		–		1	–	2	–	0
Kansas		–		1	–	2	–	0
Ohio Wesleyan		–		1	–	3	–	0
Wisconsin		–		1	–	3	–	0
Ohio State		–		1	–	4	–	0
Doane		–		0	–	1	–	0
Washburn		–		0	–	1	–	0
Western Reserve		–		0	–	3	–	0

The 1890 Lake Forest Foresters football team represented the Lake Forest College as an independent during the 1890 college football season. The team compiled a 5–3 record, shut out two opponents, and outscored their opponents by a total of 176 to 95. After losing their first three games, the Foresters finished their season with a five-game win streak and an upset victory over Wisconsin.

== Schedule ==
Date	Opponent	Site	Result	Source
September 4	Chicago YMCA	Lake Forest, IL	L 0–51	
September 11	Manuel Training High School	Lake Forest, IL	L 0–20	
September 22	Hyde Park High School	Lake Forest, IL	L 6–8	
September 25	Highland Park High School	Lake Forest, IL	W 90–0	
November 8	South Division High School	Lake Forest, IL	W 22–6	
November 15	at Englewood High School	Englewood, IL	W 30–4	
November 22	at Wisconsin	Randall Field; Madison, WI	W 14–6	
December 1	McCormick Theological	Lake Forest, IL	W 14–0	
