= 1890 Nebraska football team =

American college football season

1890 Nebraska football
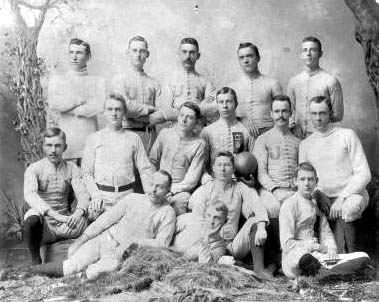

Nebraska state champion
- Conference: Independent
- Record: 2–0
- Head coach: Langdon Frothingham (1st season)

1890 Midwestern college football independents records
	Conf.			Overall
Team	W	L	T	W		L		T
Nebraska		–		2	–	0	–	0
Washington University		–		2	–	0	–	0
Minnesota		–		5	–	1	–	1
Michigan		–		4	–	1	–	0
Northwestern		–		4	–	1	–	1
Missouri		–		2	–	1	–	0
Cincinnati		–		2	–	1	–	1
Lake Forest		–		5	–	3	–	0
Baker		–		1	–	1	–	0
Iowa		–		1	–	1	–	0
Illinois		–		1	–	2	–	0
Kansas		–		1	–	2	–	0
Ohio Wesleyan		–		1	–	3	–	0
Wisconsin		–		1	–	3	–	0
Ohio State		–		1	–	4	–	0
Doane		–		0	–	1	–	0
Washburn		–		0	–	1	–	0
Western Reserve		–		0	–	3	–	0

The 1890 Nebraska football team represented the University of Nebraska in the 1890 college football season, the school's first season of competition. The team was coached by Langdon Frothingham, though his actual role is unclear. Nebraska won both of its games, one in Omaha against the Omaha YMCA and one in Crete against Doane, and claimed what amounted to a state championship.

Nebraska's football program was ostensibly founded under the direction of Dr. Langdon Frothingham, a veterinary pathologist and graduate of Harvard who was hired in 1889 to teach physiology, agriculture, and bacteriology. Frothingham was asked to oversee the new program primarily because he was familiar with the rules of the game and had brought a football with him from the East Coast. He broke his leg during a scrimmage prior to Nebraska's game against Doane. It is unclear if Frothingham traveled with the team to either game; he left the university to teach in Dresden in February 1891, around the same time Nebraska faced Doane.

== Schedule ==
Date	Time	Opponent	Site	Result	Source
November 27	3:30 p.m.	at Omaha YMCA	Ballpark on north 20th street; Omaha, NE	W 10–0	
February 14	3:00 p.m.	at Doane	Crete, NE	W 18–0	

== Coaching staff ==
Coach	Position	First year	Alma mater
Langdon Frothingham	Head coach (unofficial)	1890	Harvard
Jack Best	Trainer	1890	Nebraska
Albert Troyer	Manager	1890	Nebraska

== Roster ==
- Anderson, Arthur L
- Chandler, Charles T
- Gerrard, Ernest QB
- Hyde, Frederick G
- Johnston, James HB
- Johnston, W.M. player
- Lord, Harrison T
- Mockett, Ebenezer HB
- Morrow, Frank FB
- Mosher, Bradley FB
- Oliver HB
- Porterfield, James T
- Skiles, Charles E
- Stockton, William G
- Strohman, Charles player
- Troyer, Albert FB
- Troyer, L. E. E

== Game summaries ==
=== Omaha YMCA ===
Nebraska at Omaha YMCA

Team	1	2	Total
• Nebraska	4	6	10
Omaha YMCA	0	0	0

- Date: November 27
- Location: Omaha YMCA Ball Park, Omaha, NE

The University of Nebraska fielded their first football team, at the time without an official name, against the Omaha YMCA, on November 27, 1890. Approximately 500 students from the Lincoln campus were in attendance, a significant contingent given the transportation options available for a 55-mile journey. Early American football games were divided into two halves instead of four quarters, with four-point touchdowns and two-point "field kicks" after touchdowns.

Omaha started the game with possession and drove 40 yards before fumbling to Nebraska. Nebraska failed to capitalize, coming as close as one yard from the end zone before a penalty meant the drive resulted in no points. Omaha's subsequent possession ended early when an attempt to kick the ball out of the end zone failed and the kicker was tackled for a safety by Charles Chandler and James Porterfield, marking Nebraska's first-ever points scored and putting them ahead 2–0. After several possession changes, Nebraska came close enough to try for a field goal. However, the play was executed as a drop-kick, and although it went through the uprights it was ruled as a punt by officials, and no points were awarded.

Nebraska soon after forced an Omaha fumble in their end zone, but Omaha recovered it to prevent the touchdown, instead suffering another safety which brought the scoreboard to 4–0 Nebraska. After a third safety early in the second half, Nebraska led 6–0. The teams traded several more scoreless possession until Nebraska's Albert Troyer broke through the line and scored a touchdown to put Nebraska up 10–0, and time expired soon afterward.

The YMCA's team colors were white and red, a pairing that would eventually be adopted by Nebraska. A local newspaper mentioned a rematch game in Lincoln a few weeks later, but it was not played.

=== Doane ===
Nebraska at Doane

Team	1	2	Total
• Nebraska	14	4	18
Doane	0	0	0

- Date: February 14 (1891)
- Location: Crete, NE

The Nebraska football team, using black and gold as its colors, played the second and final game of the program's first season against Doane College in Crete, Nebraska.

Nebraska's started the game with a 50-yard pass to Ebenezer Mockett, and a subsequent 25-yard touchdown run by Oliver. The field kick was good and Nebraska was ahead 6–0. Later in the half, Oliver scored another touchdown, but the field kick failed and Nebraska led 10–0. Just before halftime, Ebenezer Mockett rushed for another touchdown to put Nebraska up 14–0.

Both teams struggled in the second half, resulting in numerous kicks and fumbles as the teams traded possession. Eventually, Doane's kicker dropped the ball in the endzone, and it was recovered by James Porterfield for another Nebraska touchdown. Again, the field kick failed, and the score remained 18–0 until time expired.
