= W. P. Astle =

American football player, coach, and official (1902–1983)

- Castle at a reception for Homer Woodson Hargiss

Biographical details
- Born: July 27, 1902; Newton, Kansas, U.S.
- Died: December 1983 (aged 81); Newton, Kansas, U.S.

Coaching career (HC unless noted)
- 1937–1939: McPherson

Head coaching record
- Overall: 9–15–3

William Pierce "Buck" Astle (July 27, 1902 – December 1983) was an American football player, coach and official.

== Playing career ==
Astle played multiple sports at Emporia State University in Emporia, Kansas. He has been inducted into the "Athletic Hall of Honor" at the school in three sports: football, basketball, and baseball. At Emporia, he played under coach Homer Woodson Hargiss.

== Coaching career ==
Astle was the head football coach at McPherson College in McPherson, Kansas, serving for three seasons, from 1937 to 1939, and compiling a record of 9–15–3.

== Officiating ==
After coaching, Astle continued to work as an official in multiple games, including the 1951 Central Missouri State vs. Southwestern football game and the 1961 Orange Bowl.

== Head coaching record ==
Year	Team	Overall	Conference	Standing	Bowl/playoffs
McPherson Bulldogs (Kansas Collegiate Athletic Conference) (1937–1939)
1937	McPherson	2–7	1–4	6th	
1938	McPherson	3–5–1	2–3	4th	
1939	McPherson	4–3–2	1–3–2	6th	
McPherson:		9–15–3	4–10–2		
Total:		9–15–3			
