= 1890 Kansas Jayhawks football team =

American college football season

1890 Kansas Jayhawks football
- The 1890 team. The photograph is mislabeled as the 1893 team.
- Conference: Independent
- Record: 1–2
- Head coach: Will Coleman (1st season)
- Captain: Howard Peairs

1890 Midwestern college football independents records
	Conf.			Overall
Team	W	L	T	W		L		T
Nebraska		–		2	–	0	–	0
Washington University		–		2	–	0	–	0
Minnesota		–		5	–	1	–	1
Michigan		–		4	–	1	–	0
Northwestern		–		4	–	1	–	1
Missouri		–		2	–	1	–	0
Cincinnati		–		2	–	1	–	1
Lake Forest		–		5	–	3	–	0
Baker		–		1	–	1	–	0
Iowa		–		1	–	1	–	0
Illinois		–		1	–	2	–	0
Kansas		–		1	–	2	–	0
Ohio Wesleyan		–		1	–	3	–	0
Wisconsin		–		1	–	3	–	0
Ohio State		–		1	–	4	–	0
Doane		–		0	–	1	–	0
Washburn		–		0	–	1	–	0
Western Reserve		–		0	–	3	–	0

The 1890 Kansas Jayhawks football team represented the University of Kansas as an independent during the 1890 college football season. In their first season of existence, the Jayhawks had no official coach. Starting center Will Coleman served as an unofficial coach for the team. In just three games of the season, the Jayhawks offense scored 33 points while the defense allowed 52 points and ended with a record of one win and two losses. This was the first season for Kansas Jayhawks football and the first game against Baker marked the first time college football was played in the state of Kansas. The Jayhawks' 14–12 victory over Baker on December 8, was the first victory in the program's history.

== Schedule ==
Date	Opponent	Site	Result	Source
November 22	at Baker	Baldwin City, KS (first college football game played in Kansas)	L 9–22	
November 27	at Kansas City YMCA	Kansas City, MO	L 10–18	
December 8	Baker	Lawrence, KS	W 14–12	
