= Washtenaw County Fairgrounds =

Football field in Ann Arbor, Michigan

Washtenaw County Fairgrounds is a former fairground and football field for the University of Michigan in Ann Arbor. The City of Ann Arbor purchased the 40-acre property in 1951 to become Veterans Park. The Fairgrounds then moved to Ann Arbor-Saline Road.

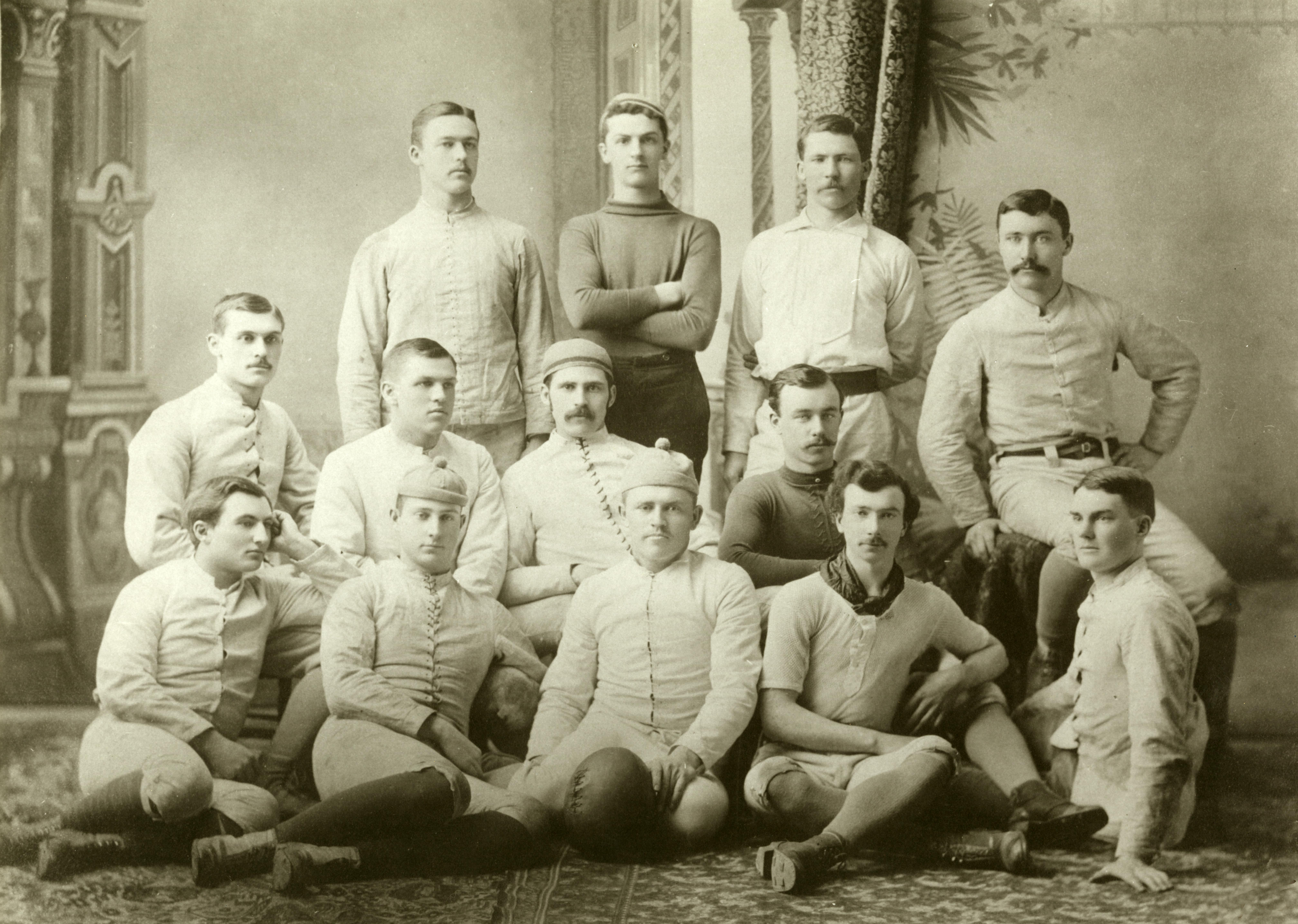
1883 Michigan Wolverines football team

The Washtenaw County Fairgrounds was the first home field for the University of Michigan men's Wolverines football team. The Wolverines played their home games at the Fairgrounds from 1883 to 1884 and again from 1886 to 1892.

The first intercollegiate football game played at the Fairgrounds was a May 12, 1883, game between Michigan and the Detroit Independents team. The game was part of a "Field Day" with events that included a ten-mile walk, wrestling and a "hop, skip, and jump" competition.
