= Harold Hunt (coach) =

American football and basketball coach

Biographical details
- Born: December 12, 1907; Milford, Kansas, U.S.
- Died: November 1, 1992 (aged 84); Oakland, California, U.S.

Coaching career (HC unless noted)

Football
- 1949–1951: Southwestern (KS)

Basketball
- 1940–1943: Quincy HS (IL)
- 1949–1952: Southwestern (KS)

Head coaching record
- Overall: 6–18–3 (college football); 31–37 (college basketball); 49–25 (high school basketball)

Harold Seymore Hunt (December 12, 1907 – November 1, 1992) was an American football and basketball coach. He stood out and gained nationwide exposure as an example of sportsmanship when he rejected a touchdown that would have won a game for his team.

== Football ==
Hunt was the 13th head football coach for the Southwestern College in Winfield, Kansas, serving for three seasons, from 1949 to 1951, and compiling a record of 6–18–3

=== The rejected touchdown ===
See 1951 Central Missouri State vs. Southwestern football game

The opening game of the 1951 season against Central Missouri State produced an event that opposing coach Tate Page called "the finest act of sportsmanship" that he ever saw. In the third quarter, Southwestern halfback Arthur Johnson completed a long run down the sidelines nearest Southwestern's bench. The referee signaled a touchdown and the crowd of 2,000 went wild with enthusiasm.

Coach Hunt ran out on the field and stated, "Southwestern rejects the touchdown!" and stated that Johnson had stepped out of bounds, nullifying the touchdown. Not a single one of the referees had been in a position to see him do so, but they agreed to nullify the touchdown, and returned the ball to the point where Coach Hunt said Johnson had stepped out. A photo of the run later confirmed Coach Hunt's observation.

== Basketball ==
From 1940 through 1943 Hunt coached basketball at Quincy Senior High School in Quincy, Illinois. His Quincy teams had 12–13 in the 1940–41 season, 23–4 in the 1941–42 season, and 14–8 in 1942–43. In 1942 and 1943, his teams won district and regional titles and qualified for the state finals. In 1943, he left Quincy to serve as a U.S. Navy officer in the V5 Pre-Flight Aviation Program.

Hunt also was the head basketball coach at Southwestern for three seasons, from 1949 to 1952, tallying a mark of 31–37.

== Head coaching record ==
=== College football ===
Year	Team	Overall	Conference	Standing	Bowl/playoffs
Southwestern Moundbuilders (Central Intercollegiate Conference) (1949–1951)
1949	Southwestern	2–7	1–5	6th	
1950	Southwestern	3–4–2	0–3–2	T–5th	
1951	Southwestern	1–7–1	0–5	6th	
Southwestern:		6–18–3	1–13–2		
Total:		6–18–3			
