= History of Nebraska Cornhuskers football =

- First season: 1890; 136 years ago
- Location: Lincoln, Nebraska
- Stadium: Lincoln Park; M Street Park; Antelope Field; Nebraska Field; Memorial Stadium
- Conference: WIUFA; MVIAA / Big Eight; Big 12; Big Ten
- All-time record: 924–430–40 (.677)
- Bowl record: 27–27 (.500)

National championships
- Claimed: 5 (1970, 1971, 1994, 1995, 1997)
- Unclaimed: 7 (1915, 1980, 1981, 1982, 1983, 1984, 1993)

Conference championships
- 46

Division championships
- 10
- Heisman winners: Johnny Rodgers – 1972; Mike Rozier – 1983; Eric Crouch – 2001
- Consensus All-Americans: 54

The history of Nebraska Cornhuskers football covers the University of Nebraska–Lincoln's football program from its inception in 1890 until the present day. Nebraska competes in the Big Ten Conference as part of the NCAA Division I Football Bowl Subdivision and plays its home games at Memorial Stadium, where it has sold out every game since 1962.

Nebraska is among the most storied programs in college football history and has the eighth-most all-time victories among FBS teams. NU has won forty-six conference championships and five national championships (1970, 1971, 1994, 1995, 1997), along with seven unclaimed national titles. Its 1971 and 1995 teams are considered among the best ever. Heisman Trophy winners Johnny Rodgers, Mike Rozier, and Eric Crouch join twenty-four other Cornhuskers in the College Football Hall of Fame.

The program's first extended period of success came early in the twentieth century. Between 1900 and 1916, Nebraska had five undefeated seasons and a stretch of thirty-four games without a loss. The Cornhuskers won twenty-four conference championships prior to World War II but struggled through the postwar years until Bob Devaney was hired in 1962. Devaney built Nebraska into a national power, winning two national championships and eight conference titles in eleven seasons as head coach. Offensive coordinator Tom Osborne was named Devaney's successor in 1973 and over the next twenty-five years established himself as one of the best coaches in college football history with his trademark I formation offense and revolutionary strength, conditioning, and nutrition programs. Following Osborne's retirement in 1997, Nebraska cycled through five head coaches before hiring Matt Rhule in 2023.

== The early years ==
=== Program origins (1890–1899) ===
Nebraska's football history unofficially began in 1889 when a group of civil engineering students chopped down enough trees to create a small field at the corner of 10th and R Streets in Lincoln. A team was formally organized in 1890 under the direction of Dr. Langdon Frothingham, a newly hired veterinary pathologist from Harvard University. Frothingham was asked to oversee the program because he was familiar with the rules of the game and had brought a football with him from the East Coast. Nebraska's first game was a 10–0 Thanksgiving Day victory over the Omaha YMCA on November 27, 1890 with several hundred fans in attendance. Frothingham broke his leg during a practice prior to the season's only other game, an 18–0 win over Doane in February 1891, and left the university shortly after.

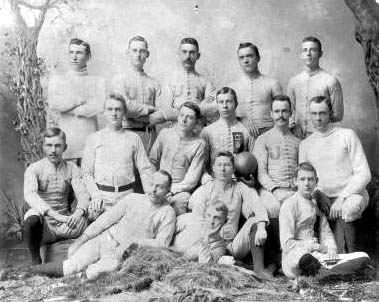
The University of Nebraska's first football team in 1890

Prior to their 1891 meeting in Omaha, Iowa sent assistant Theron Lyman to Lincoln to prepare Nebraska – which played without a coach in 1891 and 1892 – to face the more experienced Hawkeyes. Nebraska credits Lyman as its head coach for the game, though he likely did not attend Iowa's 22–0 win. In December 1891, Iowa, Kansas, Nebraska, and Missouri formed the Western Interstate University Football Association, one of college football's first conferences. Nebraska – by then playing under the colors scarlet and cream as the "Bugeaters," but also referred to as the "Rattlesnake Boys" and "Red Stockings" – appointed attorney J. S. Williams its temporary coach in the middle of 1892. His only game was a 1–0 forfeit victory over Missouri (Note: Nebraska lists the final score as 1–0, while Missouri lists it as 6–0. The schools agree the result was a victory for Nebraska via Missouri forfeit.) after the Tigers refused to play against African-American George Flippin. Flippin, NU's first black athlete and the fifth at a predominantly white university, later joked "I was so good I beat the University of Missouri all by myself."

University supporters became upset by the "cheap-John plan of amateur coaches" and the school hired Frank Crawford as its first official head coach in 1893. Crawford became a vocal critic of Flippin and vetoed the election of his star player as team captain, stating "it takes a man with brains to be a captain; all there is to Flippin is brute force." During Crawford's second season, the first documented use of "Cornhuskers" as a football term appeared in school newspaper The Hesperian Student ("We have met the corn huskers and they are ours!"), though it was used as a derisive reference to Iowa and not as an athletic nickname. Nebraska won its first conference championship in 1894, after which Crawford departed for Texas. Assistant Charles Thomas was promoted and led the Bugeaters to a second WIUFA title the following season, which included a long-distance road trip to Butte, Montana.

Nebraska was coached by a pair of future College Football Hall of Famers to close the nineteenth century – though both are better known for their tenures elsewhere, Edward N. Robinson and Fielding Yost led NU from 1896 to 1898. The Nebraska Legislature moved to ban the sport of football after the 1897 death of a Doane player, but the idea was dismissed after significant debate between fans and politicians. Later that year, Nebraska defeated Kansas 10–5 to clinch the WIUFA title in a game that ended due to darkness after a lengthy argument over an NU touchdown. Nebraska was on the losing end of the same situation in 1898 – a title-deciding game against Iowa was called early with the Hawkeyes leading 6–5 despite the team arriving to Lincoln hours late.

Alonzo Edwin Branch took over in 1899, the program's only losing season prior to World War I.

=== Emergence as a Midwest power (1900–1905) ===
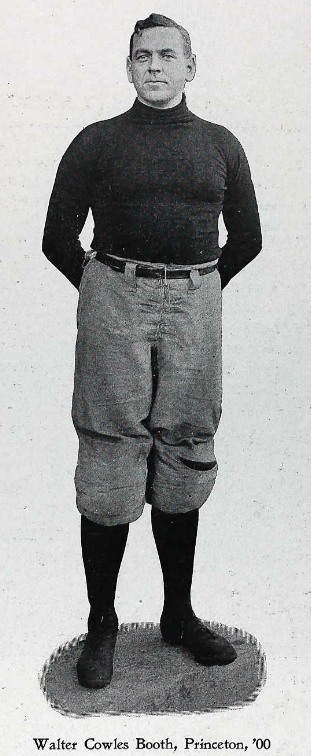
Walter C. Booth led Nebraska to twenty-four consecutive wins from 1901 to 1904

The University of Nebraska's football program did not have a nickname during its first decade, though many were used unofficially. The most popular was Bugeaters, a reference to Nebraska's meager food supply during an 1870s drought; many Nebraskans appreciated the rugged characterization despite its negative connotations. Sportswriter and state native Cy Sherman hated the Bugeaters moniker and began using "Cornhuskers," which had appeared previously but wasn't applied to Nebraska until Sherman did so in 1899. It caught on quickly and was officially adopted in 1900. Nebraska hired former Princeton star Walter C. Booth the same year and he soon raised a Midwest football power. In Booth's debut season, the Cornhuskers held their first seven opponents scoreless before falling to Minnesota in the first-ever meeting between the teams.

Booth's 1902 team, the best in Nebraska's young football history, finished 9–0 while outscoring opponents 164–0. The Cornhuskers' title hopes were dashed when Fielding Yost's 11–0 Michigan team was voted national champion following a season-ending 23–6 win over Minnesota (Nebraska defeated the Gophers 6–0). Nebraska applied to join the Big Nine Conference (now the Big Ten) after the season, believing Michigan's membership elevated its title chances, but the application was denied on account of Lincoln's distance from other schools in the conference. Booth's teams were led by halfback John Bender, who starred for five seasons and retired as college football's all-time scoring leader. Bender captained NU to another undefeated season in 1903. Having won twenty-two consecutive games, most in dominant fashion, it was written that Booth could "weep with Alexander the Great because there are no more teams to conquer," given Nebraska's difficulty finding competitive and willing opposition in the Midwest.

Colorado defeated Nebraska 6–0 in October 1904, ending a twenty-four-game win streak that was a program record until 1995. (Note: Nebraska won several exhibition games against Lincoln High School during its twenty-four-game winning streak, which are not included.) Booth left Nebraska following the 1905 season over a contract dispute (his $2,000 salary was higher than any other university faculty member) and returned with a newly earned law degree to the East Coast, where he lived the rest of his life away from football.

=== A new landscape (1906–1910) ===
Months after Booth's departure and still without a head coach, Nebraska faced Doane in an exhibition to familiarize its team with college football's significant offseason rule changes. These safety-based updates were mandated by President Theodore Roosevelt and included the legalization of the forward pass, the banning of the flying wedge, the creation of a neutral zone, and an increase in yards to gain a first down from five to ten. NU professor and chairman of the athletic board James T. Lees was a member of the committee that drafted the new rules, which were initially unpopular but proved instrumental in improving player safety.

Nebraska hired former Michigan tackle and assistant coach William C. Cole in 1907, the same year it formed the Missouri Valley Intercollegiate Athletic Association (later the Big Eight) along with seven other Midwest universities. NU's 16–6 win over Kansas in its lone conference game was enough to claim the first MVIAA championship. Cole resigned after a second title in 1910 when the MVIAA passed legislation requiring coaches to be full-time faculty members, feeling he could not manage his farm in Missoula, Montana while living year-round in Lincoln. NU beat Haskell 119–0 in his final game, the largest margin of victory in program history.

During the third year of Cole's four-year tenure, the university opened Nebraska Field, its first venue designed to host football. The driving force behind the new stadium was Earl Eager, one of Nebraska's first graduate managers of athletics (a part-time precursor to the modern athletic director). Eager was a former halfback who played his entire collegiate career at Antelope Field, which had little permanent seating and was described as "either as hard as pavement or a sea of mud." Eager's cause was assisted by the university's expansion, which necessitated the construction of academic buildings on Antelope Field. Eager himself prepared much of the land for the stadium at the northeast corner of North 10th and T Streets. Nebraska and Iowa tied 6–6 on October 23, 1909 in the first game at Nebraska Field.

=== The Stiehm Rollers (1911–1915) ===
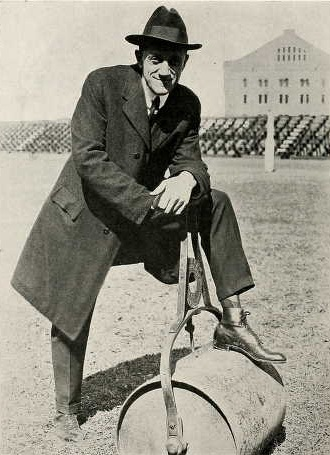
Ewald O. Stiehm with the "Stiehm Roller" in 1920

Following Cole's departure, Nebraska hired Ewald O. Stiehm from Ripon College as the first full-time coach in school history. The twenty-four-year-old Stiehm – nicknamed "Jumbo" because of his large feet, a term he despised – was given an annual salary of $2,000 to serve as head football coach and director of athletics, the same as Booth's salary five years earlier but less than the $3,000 his predecessor earned for a less-demanding role. Stiehm's tenure began with a 117–0 victory over Kearney–Normal, the only game ever played between Nebraska and what is now Nebraska–Kearney. The fiery Stiehm was subject to such frequent outbursts that the school established a women and children's sitting section at Nebraska Field far from the home sideline.

Nebraska's 1911 season included high-profile meetings with Minnesota (a 21–3 Golden Gophers win) and Michigan (a 6–6 draw). Stiehm was particularly enamored with the Minnesota shift, a precursor to modern pre-snap motion, and had an assistant document the technique during the teams' 1912 meeting. Stiehm implemented the shift the following week, the first game of a school-record thirty-four-game unbeaten stretch. This included a 7–0 victory over Minnesota in 1913 which prompted Golden Gophers coach Henry L. Williams to discontinue the annual series between the schools. Stiehm assembled smaller-than-usual rosters with players that relied on quickness and misdirection, a departure from Nebraska's reputation as an "unusually rough" program (it's unclear if this reputation was deserved). His "Stiehm Rollers" lost just twice during his five-year tenure.

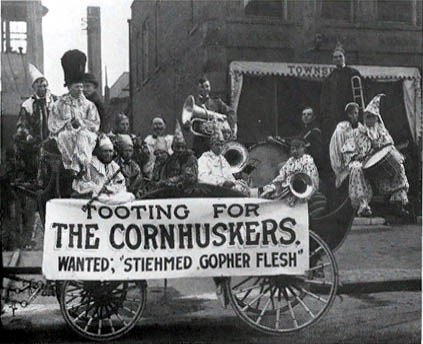
Supporters before Nebraska's game against Minnesota on Oct. 18, 1913

Prior to a 1913 trip to Lincoln, Kansas State head coach Guy Lowman threatened a boycott due to the presence of lineman Clinton Ross, a black player, on Nebraska's roster. Though KSU faced NU and Ross each of the previous two seasons without complaint, it joined the MVIAA in 1913 and Lowman claimed a gentlemen's agreement throughout the conference disallowed black athletes. Nebraska denied such an agreement existed and the game was played as scheduled. Ross was NU's last black player until 1952 despite Stiehm and university chancellor Samuel Avery outwardly favoring integration in collegiate athletics.

In 1914, Vic Halligan was named the first All-American in Nebraska history; (Note: Halligan was also named a third-team All-American in 1913 and unofficially in 1915. Walter Camp, an influential voice in the formation of early football, named Halligan to his 1915 All-America team, despite Halligan having graduated the season before. Critics used this as evidence Camp made his selections with limited knowledge of Western players and teams.) Guy Chamberlin became NU's first consensus All-American a year later. (Note: A consensus All-American is named a first-team selection by more than half of selector organizations.) Chamberlin served in the United States Army during World War I and later joined the Canton Bulldogs of the young American Professional Football Association (now the National Football League). He won two NFL championships as a player and four more as a player/coach and was elected to the Pro Football Hall of Fame in 1965. Led by Chamberlin, Nebraska finished 1915 undefeated and won its sixth consecutive MVIAA title. NU gave Notre Dame its only loss in the first meeting of what became an annual rivalry. The Cornhuskers were invited to face Northwest Conference champion Washington State in the second Rose Bowl, but university officials balked at the cost of sending the team to Pasadena and declined. Nebraska was retroactively awarded the 1915 national championship by multiple iterations of the Billingsley Report, an NCAA-designated selector developed in the 1960s, but does not claim the championship.

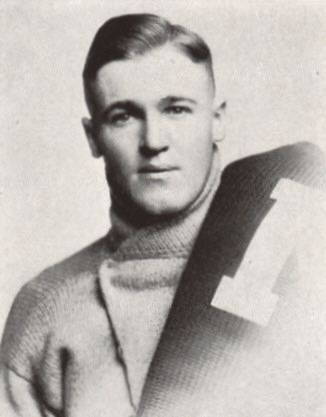
End Guy Chamberlin was named Nebraska's first consensus All-American in 1915

Stiehm had verbally agreed to remain at Nebraska until at least 1917, but given the successes of the entire athletic department (he also coached Nebraska's basketball team to three conference championships), asked the Athletic Board for a raise in 1916. The board refused and declined an offer from local businesses to help pay the additional salary, and Stiehm agreed to take over Indiana's athletic department at an annual salary of $4,500. He later stated that even after receiving Indiana's lucrative offer, he would've stayed at Nebraska if it met his initial request of $4,250 (approximately a twenty-percent raise). Stiehm's career record at NU was 35–2–3 and his .913 winning percentage is the highest in school history. He arrived in Bloomington to significant fanfare but his teams never reached the heights they did at Nebraska. After seven years at Indiana, Stiehm died of stomach cancer at age thirty-seven.

=== Post-Stiehm years (1916–1922) ===
Nebraska hired E. J. Stewart from Oregon Agricultural (now Oregon State) to replace Stiehm as head football and basketball coach. NU traveled to Portland, Oregon to face Stewart's former team in 1916, the furthest west the Cornhuskers had ever traveled. This was partly a result of Stewart's desire to schedule more difficult opposition across all sports, which he viewed as the best way to "add to Nebraska prestige around the United States." He addressed this in the 1917 Cornhusker student yearbook: "playing only the big institutions in football in the future is probably the most important step undertaken by the new athletic administration."

Three games after defeating Oregon Agricultural, Nebraska's lengthy unbeaten streak was ended in a 7–3 defeat to Kansas in Lincoln. Two weeks later, NU faced new rival Notre Dame – assistant Knute Rockne served as head coach for the game, the first of ten he would lead the Irish against the Cornhuskers. Stewart's vision was realized in 1917 when Nebraska faced powerhouses Michigan and Syracuse in addition to Notre Dame. As the season progressed the college football landscape was disrupted by American entry into World War I – Nebraska lost several players to the war throughout 1917 and Stewart himself departed to assist the YMCA, which helped promote morale and provided services to prisoners of war. With its roster and staff depleted by the war and the Spanish flu pandemic, the university mandated football participation for members of the Student Army Training Corps and asked professor William G. Kline to lead the makeshift team. Near the end of a shortened season, the team received word that star end Roscoe Rhodes, set to be a team captain before he was drafted, was killed in action in France on October 28, 1918.

Stewart briefly returned to Lincoln after the war in an administrative capacity; though no longer head coach, he ordered heather green jerseys for the team to wear in 1919. The university attempted to order its traditional scarlet and cream jerseys after Stewart departed permanently, but the green uniforms had already been manufactured. The changes were reverted the following year.

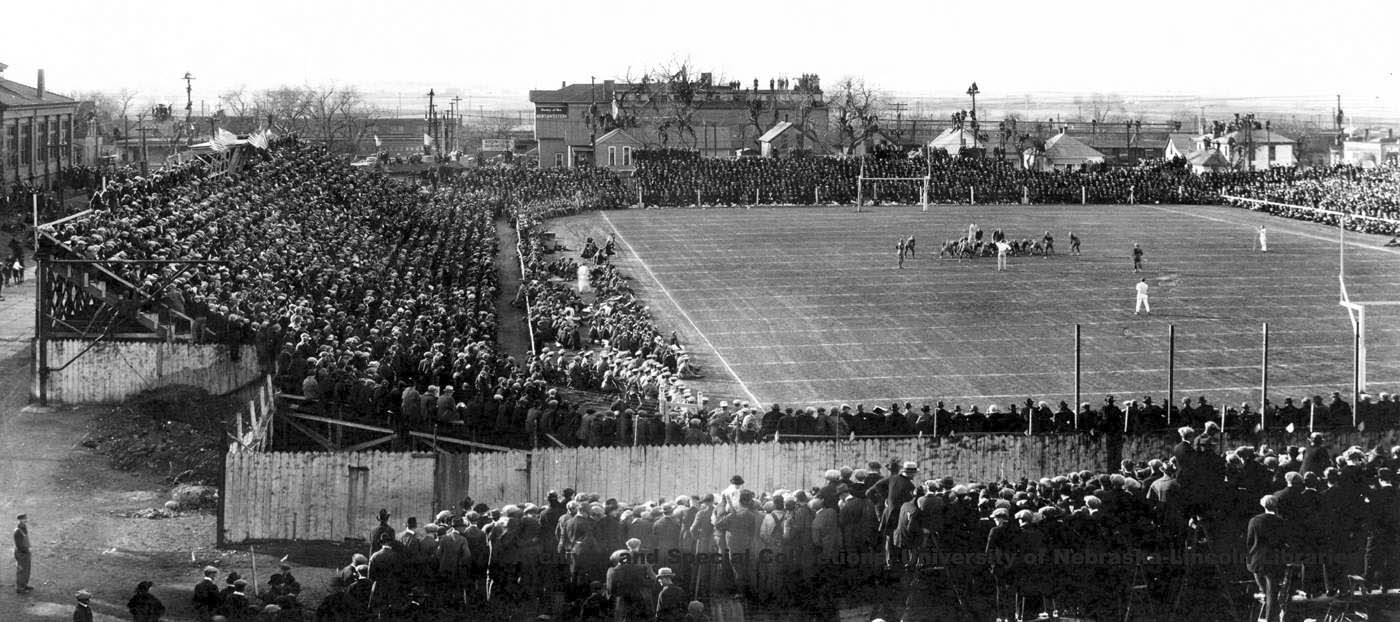
Nebraska vs. Notre Dame at Nebraska Field on Nov. 30, 1922, the final game at the stadium

Nebraska played 1919 and 1920 independent of the MVIAA after being banned for hosting Oklahoma in Omaha (MVIAA rules dictated schools must play home games on their campus). Henry Schulte, described by Rockne as "the greatest line coach in the game," was head coach for only two seasons but remained on staff as an assistant until 1927. Nebraska named the Schulte Field House in his honor, which served as the program's primary practice and locker room facility from 1949 until 2004.

Nebraska rejoined the MVIAA in 1921, the same year it hired Fred Dawson from Columbia as head coach. Dawson's first season featured a November trip to face Pop Warner and Pitt – Nebraska's 10–0 victory was among the first football games broadcast live on radio, though Lincoln was out of signal range of Pittsburgh radio station KDKA. The Cornhuskers finished 7–1, falling only to Notre Dame in South Bend. Dawson and NU beat the Irish the following two seasons, the only losses across four years for Notre Dame's offensive backfield nicknamed the "Four Horsemen." Nebraska's 14–6 victory in 1922 was the final game at Nebraska Field. The series continued until 1925 when Notre Dame administrators canceled it, citing "antagonistic, anti-Catholic behavior" during their visits to Lincoln.

== Post-World War I years ==
=== First seasons at Memorial Stadium (1923–1929) ===
The University of Nebraska began exploring the construction of a larger steel-and-concrete stadium less than a decade after Nebraska Field was completed. The wooden bleachers of Nebraska Field were often filled beyond capacity and the condition of the venue became "as inadequate as the old one was in 1907." The departure of Jumbo Stiehm and American entry into World War I delayed the project but fundraising was restarted in earnest when college football exploded in popularity after the war. The Nebraska Memorial Association initially planned a stadium, museum, and gymnasium complex to be dedicated in honor of Roscoe Rhodes, but the project was scaled back due to fundraising difficulties and local pushback (a gymnasium, the Nebraska Coliseum, was constructed three years later). A groundbreaking ceremony was held on April 23, 1923 when the fundraising target of $430,000 had been met.

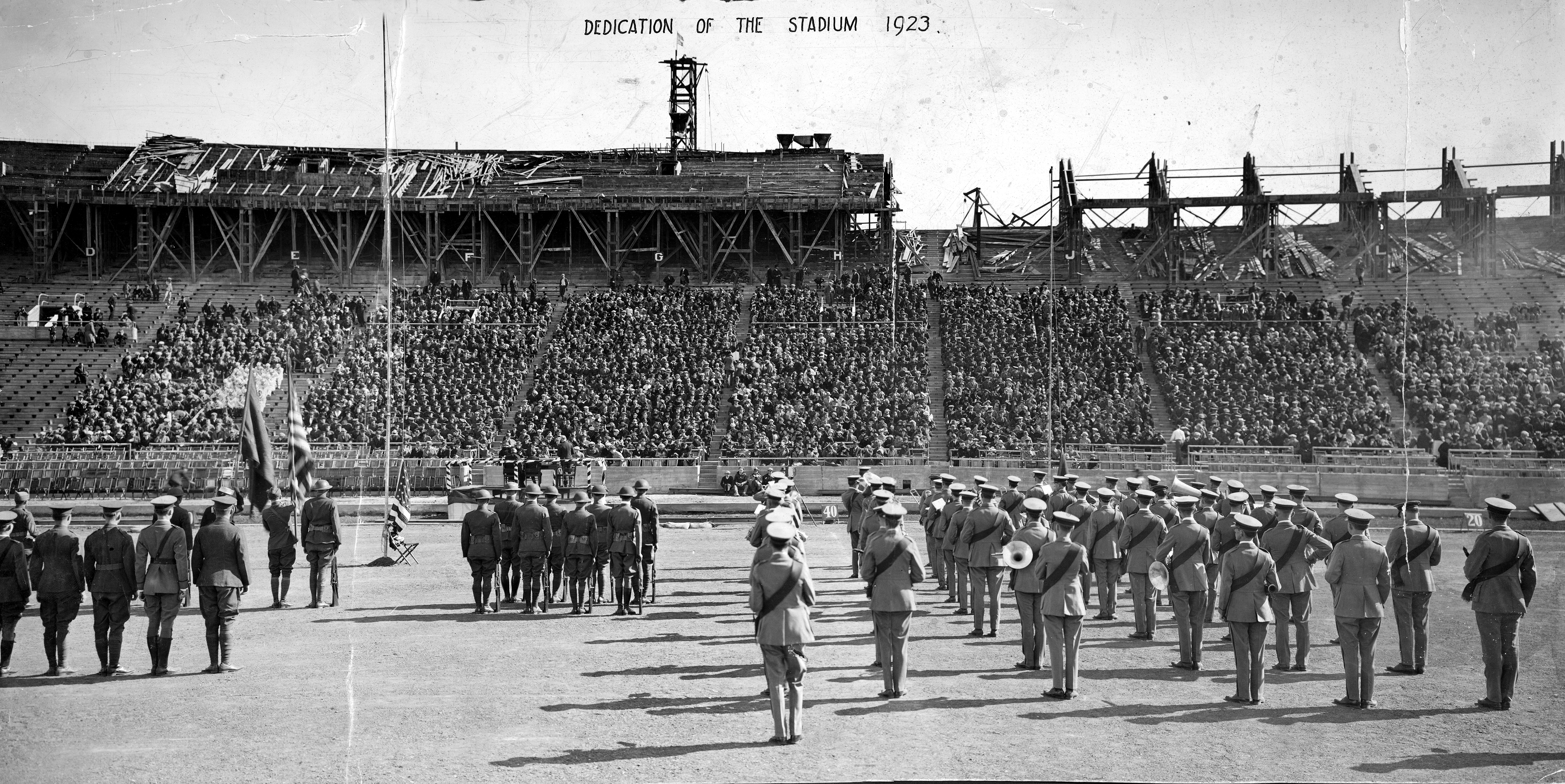
The dedication of Memorial Stadium on Oct. 20, 1923

The 31,080-seat venue, designed pro bono by local architects John Latenser and Ellery Davis, was ready for the start of the 1923 season, though its upper sections were unfinished and the grass playing surface had yet to be installed. Nebraska defeated Oklahoma 24–0 in the first game at Memorial Stadium on October 13, 1923. (Note: Nebraska was forced into blue practice jerseys when Oklahoma mistakenly brought its home reds to Lincoln. NU wore blue-trimmed uniforms to honor Memorial Stadium's hundredth anniversary in 2023.) Instead of naming the stadium for Rhodes, the dedication was expanded to include all Nebraskans who served in the American Civil War, the Spanish–American War, and World War I.

Nebraska hosted Illinois and star Red Grange at Memorial Stadium to open 1924 – the Cornhuskers contained Grange but the favored Illini won 9–6. Dawson had taken a leave of absence for health reasons the previous winter and retired following the season. Ernest Bearg, the top assistant to Illinois head coach Robert Zuppke, was named Dawson's successor – NU's athletic board believed Bearg's experience as a backfield coach with Grange would complement Henry Schulte, who was still on staff as a highly regarded line coach. Nebraska defeated Illinois and Zuppke 14–0 in Champaign in Bearg's debut, the first home game of Grange's career in which he did not score. Tackle Ed Weir was the star of this defensive display and after the season he became the first Cornhusker to twice be named a first-team All-American. Weir, who Knute Rockne called "the greatest tackle I ever saw," was a charter member of the College Football Hall of Fame in 1951.

Representatives from the ten MVIAA universities met in Lincoln in 1928 and agreed to a splintering of the conference – Iowa State, Kansas, Kansas State, Missouri, Nebraska, and Oklahoma retained the MVIAA name (though it became more commonly referred to as the Big Six) and Drake, Grinnell, Oklahoma A&M (now Oklahoma State), and Washington University formed the Missouri Valley Conference. Nebraska won the inaugural Big Six title in dominating fashion, defeating its five conference opponents by a combined score of 108–6. However, Bearg was criticized for "not using deception and strategy" after disappointing late-season results against Pittsburgh (a 0–0 draw) and Army (a 13–3 loss), and tendered his resignation.

=== Dana Bible and Biff Jones (1929–1941) ===
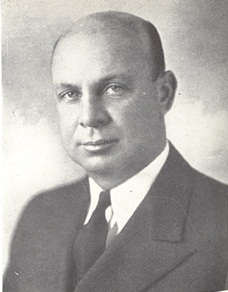
Dana X. Bible in 1935

Nebraska tried to hire Knute Rockne away from Notre Dame but instead settled on Texas A&M head coach Dana X. Bible at Rockne's suggestion. Bible served at A&M for eleven highly successful years, winning five Southwest Conference titles and producing two teams that would retroactively be named national champion. Bible was a staunch believer in "fundamental football" and emphasized the importance of scouting and meticulous planning prior to each game. Shortly after being hired, he embarked on a statewide tour explaining his methodology and asking for support.

Bible's early teams were led by state native George Sauer, a two-way star whose big-game performances drew national recognition. Sauer and NU finished 8–1 in 1933 and were ranked second nationally by the Dickinson System, an NCAA-designated selector. Nebraska graduated all but one starter and in its 1934 spring game a team of freshman defeated a team of upperclassmen. Among these freshmen was halfback Sam Francis, a future Olympian who finished runner-up for the Heisman Trophy in 1936 and became Nebraska's first number-one selection in the NFL draft.

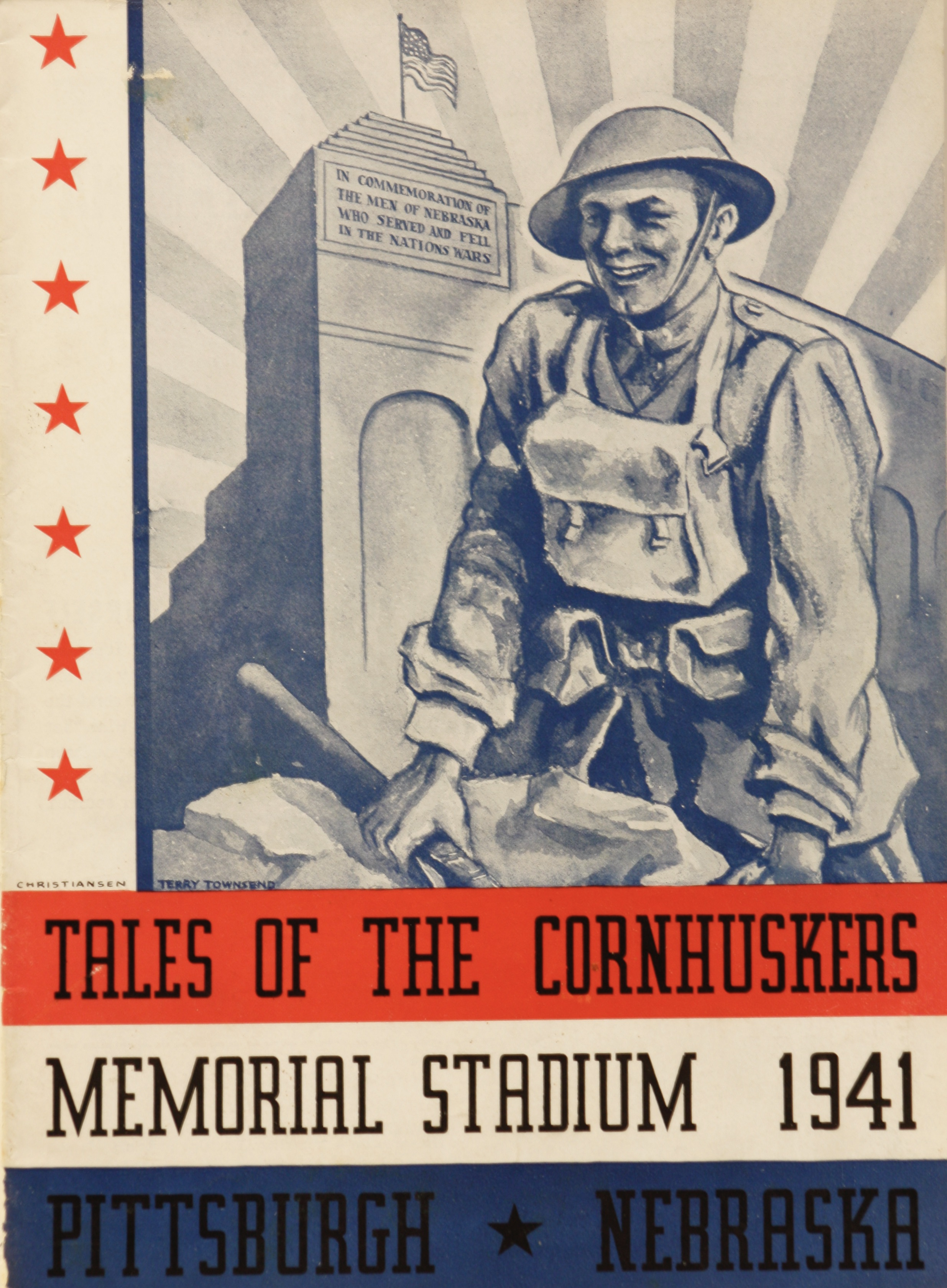
Official program for Nebraska's game against Pittsburgh on Nov. 15, 1941, three weeks before the United States entered World War II

Led by Francis and backfield mate Lloyd Cardwell, Nebraska debuted at No. 15 in the inaugural AP poll in October 1936 and finished the season ranked ninth. In January 1937, Bible accepted a twenty-year contract worth $15,000 annually to become head coach at Texas, departing Nebraska after eight seasons as its longest-tenured head coach. He assisted in the search for his replacement, Biff Jones, and was a charter member of the College Football Hall of Fame in 1951.

Jones was a veteran head coach when he arrived at Nebraska – he coached Army for four years, LSU for three, and Oklahoma for two. He was also a reserve officer in the United States Army and was forced to resign from OU when he was transferred to Fort Leavenworth in November 1936. Months later, he retired from the armed forces with the rank of major to accept the job at NU.

Nebraska lost just once in Jones's first season, a 13–7 defeat to eventual AP champion Pittsburgh. NU was held to negative net yardage but maintained a narrow advantage until a late fumble in its own territory allowed the Panthers to take their first lead, which they did not relinquish. Nebraska's 25–9 victory over Kansas State in 1939 was broadcast locally in Manhattan, making it the second televised college football game. NU finished 7–1–1 but failed to win the Big Six for a second consecutive year.

Nebraska reclaimed the conference title in 1940 and finally played in its first bowl game after declining a Rose Bowl invitation in 1916 – No. 7 Nebraska fell 21–13 to No. 2 Stanford in the 1941 Rose Bowl. Stanford coach Clark Shaughnessy is considered the "father of the T formation" and along with Bible (then at Texas) helped popularize the offense throughout the 1940s. Nebraska adopted the T formation in 1941 with limited success; the Cornhuskers were shut out twice and limped to a 4–5 finish, which included the first five-game losing streak in school history. Jones signed a long-term contract extension following the season but was recalled soon after to teach at the United States Military Academy during World War II. Though Nebraska maintained the position would still be available to him after the war, Jones remained at West Point and never coached football again.

=== War years (1942–1949) ===
The landscape of college football changed drastically during World War II as most able-bodied men were drawn into the war effort. The most successful football universities of the era were those which offered military programs, especially service academies – Army claims a national title in each of the 1944, 1945, and 1946 seasons. Nebraska did not provide military courses of any kind, and while the university was still able to field a team (mostly made up of seventeen-year-olds not eligible to be drafted) when many major programs could not, the Cornhuskers suffered four consecutive losing seasons after only three in the program's first fifty-one years. Jones's assistant Glenn Presnell led a makeshift team in 1942 until he was drafted into the Navy and replaced by athletic director Adolph J. Lewandowski. Lewandowski released the entire coaching staff, including himself, after back-to-back 2–6 seasons and hired NFL veteran George Clark.

Clark resigned from his coaching duties after a single season but remained in an administrative role and assisted in the hire of Bernie Masterson, a former Shaughnessy assistant. Masterson rededicated the program to the T-form and implemented aspects of the Chicago Bears playbook from his time as a quarterback under George Halas. This complex scheme, which required the memorization of hundreds of plays and alignments, did not translate into results – Nebraska struggled mightily on offense under Masterson and he was fired two seasons into a five-year contract. His final Big Six game was a 14–13 defeat against Oklahoma and first-year coach Bud Wilkinson. In the week prior to the game NU's student council protested a longstanding agreement among Big Six universities prohibiting black athletes and accused OU's athletic board of perpetuating this agreement.

Clark reappointed himself following Masterson's firing and again led the team for a single year, Nebraska's eighth consecutive season with fewer wins than losses and the same year future rival Colorado joined the MVIAA (unofficially renamed the Big Seven). Among the few bright spots of this era was fullback, center, and linebacker "Train Wreck" Tom Novak, whose "fearless, relentless passion" endeared him to fans. The Omaha native received a marching band tribute during halftime of his final home game and remains the only four-time all-conference selection in program history. After he was paralyzed in a fall later in life, the university created the Tom Novak Award to be given annually to the senior who "best exemplifies courage and determination despite all odds." Novak's no. 60 has not been worn since and is one of two numbers the school has permanently retired.

=== Continued struggles (1950–1961) ===
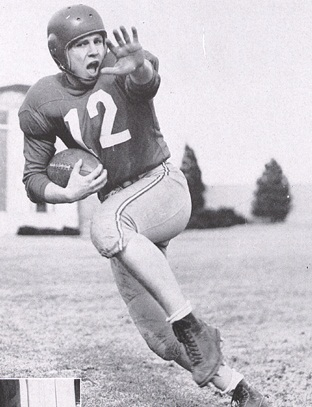
Bobby Reynolds in 1951, a year after being named "Mr. Touchdown, U.S.A."

Nebraska hired New Hampshire head coach Bill Glassford in 1949, signing him to an "ironclad" contract worth $12,500 annually. Glassford was a disciplinarian who led rigorous and lengthy practice sessions year-round. His hard-nosed methods were initially successful – Nebraska finished 6–2–1 in 1950, its first winning season since 1941, and was ranked seventeenth nationally. Halfback Bobby Reynolds rushed for 1,342 yards and was named "Mr. Touchdown, U.S.A.," a promotional award given by RCA to the player who scored the most touchdowns in 1950. His 157 points were the fourth-most in major college football history.

Glassford's demanding regiment began to take a toll the following season – during a preseason "boot camp" in Curtis, Nebraska (over 200 miles from Lincoln), Reynolds suffered a shoulder injury from which he never fully recovered. Among the backfield replacements for Reynolds was Tom Carodine, Nebraska's first black player since 1913. NU went just 2–8 in 1951 (Note: One of Nebraska's two wins in 1951 was a 6–6 tie against Kansas State in Manhattan later credited as a forfeit victory for NU when it was discovered two Wildcats were ineligible.) and was similarly mediocre the following seasons. The situation became so dire – in terms of both on-field results and off-field treatment – that a group of thirty-five players (over half the team) petitioned the university to remove Glassford in January 1954, but his airtight contract made it "nearly impossible" to terminate him. In response, Glassford discontinued his remote preseason camp and attempted to improve his relationships with players.

Nebraska was invited to play in the 1955 Orange Bowl despite going just 6–4, as Big Seven rules prevented champion Oklahoma from appearing in consecutive seasons. Nebraska fell to Duke 34–7 at Burdine Stadium (later the Miami Orange Bowl) in its first of seventeen Orange Bowl appearances. Instead of exercising a five-year contract option that would have tied him to NU until 1960, Glassford resigned after a 5–5 1955 season and never returned to coaching. Despite the icy relationships he developed during his tenure, Glassford was a Nebraska supporter and booster for the rest of his life and maintained relationships with some of his former players. In 2016, he died at 102 as the oldest-living NFL player.

Nebraska hired twenty-nine-year-old Bud Wilkinson assistant Pete Elliott to replace Glassford, but he left for California after a single season. Backfield coach Bill Jennings, who had followed Elliott from Norman, was promoted to head coach. Elliott and Jennings brought Wilkinson's split-T formation to Lincoln with minimal success – Nebraska was shutout thirteen times in fifty games under Jennings.

The highlight of Jennings's tenure was an upset victory over Oklahoma in 1959 that ended OU's NCAA-record seventy-four-game conference winning streak. NU opened the following season with a win in Austin over No. 4 Texas; Nebraska entered the AP poll for the first time since 1954 but lost six of its remaining nine games to finish 4–6. Jennings frequently found himself at odds with program supporters, at one point stating "there is an intense desire to do something good in this state, like elect a president or gain prominence in politics. But we can't feed the ego of the state of Nebraska with the football team." Jennings coached Nebraska to five consecutive losing seasons; after his removal the program did not have another for nearly four decades.

== Bob Devaney era ==
=== A quick turnaround (1962–1966) ===
New athletic director Tippy Dye did not renew Jennings's contract and attempted to bring Hank Foldberg to Lincoln, the same coach he hired at Wichita (now Wichita State). Foldberg declined so he could return to his alma mater Texas A&M, and Dye turned to Michigan State's Duffy Daugherty, a friend of NU chancellor Clifford M. Hardin from his own time at MSU. Daugherty suggested Dye and Hardin instead interview Bob Devaney, his former assistant who had been at Wyoming since 1957. Devaney's teams won or shared the Skyline Conference championship four of his five years in Laramie and twice finished in the national top twenty-five, which Nebraska had not done since 1950. Dye offered the job to Devaney, but there was skepticism Wyoming would release Devaney from his recently extended contract. Devaney unofficially began his coaching duties at Nebraska in January 1962, touring the state and meeting with players a full month before Wyoming's board of trustees voted 8–4 to grant his release.

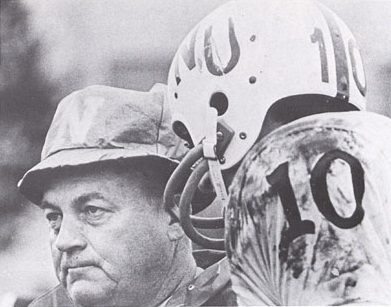
Bob Devaney and quarterback Frank Patrick in 1967

Nebraska won Devaney's first six games before falling to Missouri – the first game of Memorial Stadium's sellout streak that would become an NCAA record. NU was invited to the Gotham Bowl, defeating Miami (FL) 36–34 on a frigid day in New York City to earn the program's first bowl win. The star of Devaney's early teams was offensive lineman "Boomer" Bob Brown, who ran a 4.4-second forty-yard dash despite being the largest player on Nebraska's roster. Brown, the second selection in the 1964 NFL draft, became a five-time All-Pro and joins Guy Chamberlin and Will Shields as the only Cornhuskers in the College Football and Pro Football Hall of Fame.

Nebraska's thirty-two-year conference title drought ended in 1963 when the Cornhuskers beat Oklahoma to claim the Big Eight (Note: The MVIAA was unofficially renamed to the Big Eight when Oklahoma State rejoined the conference in 1960. In 1964, the conference officially became the Big Eight.) championship in the last week of the regular season. The game, a 29–20 Nebraska win, was nearly canceled due to the assassination of John F. Kennedy the day prior. Despite OU head coach Bud Wilkinson, a personal friend of Kennedy's, receiving permission from his brother Robert to play the game, both schools were criticized in the aftermath. NU defeated Auburn in the Orange Bowl to finish 10–1 and ended the season ranked sixth, the highest final rank in school history. (Note: The AP poll typically released its final rankings prior to bowl season until 1968. The Coaches Poll did the same until 1974.) The 1963 season was the final college football season to require a one-platoon system; beginning in 1964, teams were allowed unlimited substitutions to create dedicated offensive, defensive, and special teams units.

Nebraska's surge into the upper echelon of college football continued through the mid-1960s. The Cornhuskers began 1964 9–0 before being upset by Oklahoma and falling to Arkansas in the Cotton Bowl. NU opened 1965 as the top-ranked team in the country for the first time and started 10–0, defending its Big Eight title for a second consecutive season. Though NU fell to No. 3 by bowl season, losses by top-ranked Michigan State and No. 2 Arkansas meant Nebraska's Orange Bowl matchup with No. 4 Alabama was a de facto national championship game (in 1965, the Associated Press broke from tradition and released its final poll after bowl season). Bear Bryant's Crimson Tide gained 518 yards and beat Devaney's Cornhuskers 39–28 in the first of three bowl meetings between the coaches. In 1966 Nebraska won the Big Eight and started 9–0 for a third consecutive season, but was again upset by Oklahoma and fell out of national championship contention. After the season, Tippy Dye resigned and Devaney became athletic director.

=== Staff changes and Devaney's first title (1967–1970) ===
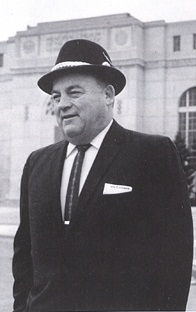
Bob Devaney in 1965

Despite unprecedented national success during Devaney's tenure, another loss to Oklahoma and a second bowl loss to SEC power Alabama raised concerns his teams didn't have the caliber of athletes to regularly compete at the highest level. This was exacerbated by a 1967 season in which Devaney's "full house" T-form offense averaged less than thirteen points per game and Nebraska finished 6–4 despite leading the country in total defense. Devaney began to place greater emphasis on fast, athletic players – his talented 1968 recruiting class included Jerry Tagge, Jeff Kinney, Rich Glover, and Larry Jacobson. After another 6–4 season, Devaney gave control of the offense to thirty-one-year-old I formation disciple Tom Osborne, a move Devaney said "saved his career."

Osborne's later teams were famous for their prolific use of the run-heavy I-form option, but his first offenses relied on a more balanced attack with similarities to modern spread formations. Osborne's I-form design included a wingback, a position made famous at Nebraska by versatile offensive and special teams weapon Johnny Rodgers. Devaney also promoted defensive assistant Monte Kiffin prior to 1969, though he was not officially named defensive coordinator until Osborne became head coach (Osborne is the only assistant Devaney ever gave the title of "coordinator"). Kiffin's preferred one-gap technique required quick, responsible defensive line play and he encouraged players to take up racquetball to maintain agility and mental sharpness. Osborne and Kiffin were assisted by Boyd Epley, who founded one of the country's first football-focused weightlifting programs. At the time he was approached by Epley, Devaney was unaware of any programs using what Epley referred to as "strength training." Epley remained at Nebraska for thirty-five years and is sometimes considered the "father of modern strength and conditioning."

Nebraska started 2–2 in Osborne's first year leading the offense but won its final seven games, with dominant season-ending victories over Oklahoma and Georgia led by quarterback Van Brownson. NU began 1970 in the national top ten with Brownson as the presumptive starter, but he injured his elbow in preseason camp. Jerry Tagge started the season's first two games, including a 21–21 tie against No. 3 USC in Los Angeles, and Devaney opted for an unusual rotation between the two quarterbacks when Brownson returned. Brownson and Tagge split time the rest of the season and led Nebraska to a 10–0–1 finish.

NU exited its regular-season finale ranked third nationally but likely needing losses by three other unbeaten teams (Texas, Ohio State, and Notre Dame) to have a national title shot. Notre Dame lost to USC in its own regular-season finale before defeating Texas in the Cotton Bowl and Ohio State was upset by Stanford in the Rose Bowl, opening the door for Nebraska to claim the national title with an Orange Bowl win over LSU. Trailing 12–10 in the fourth quarter, Tagge led a sixty-seven-yard drive and scored on a quarterback sneak to give NU a lead it would not relinquish. As the only unbeaten power-conference team, Nebraska was the presumptive title favorite over one-loss Notre Dame, but Devaney still campaigned after the game: "even the Pope would have to vote us number one." The next day Nebraska was elected national champion, its first from a major selector. President Richard Nixon visited the university on January 14 to present the team with a plaque honoring it as "undisputed champions."

=== The Game of the Century and a title repeat (1971–1972) ===
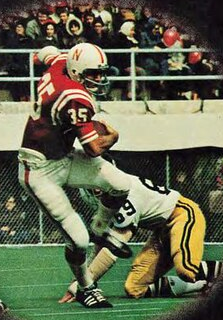
I-back Jeff Kinney scored four touchdowns in Nebraska's 1971 "Game of the Century" win over Oklahoma

With Tagge as the unquestioned starter, Nebraska began 1971 as the country's second-ranked team and quickly moved up to number one. The Cornhuskers won each of their first eleven games by at least twenty-four points to set up a Thanksgiving Day meeting with No. 2 Oklahoma. NU and OU were each among the best teams of the era, combining for seventeen of twenty-two all-Big Eight selections and twelve staff members who became FBS or NFL head coaches. The headline matchup of "The Game of the Century" was Nebraska's defense (allowing 6.4 points per game) against Oklahoma's new wishbone offense (scoring 44.6 points per game). The buildup was unprecedented – Oklahoma expanded the press box at Owen Field to accommodate credential requests from more than twenty states. OU coach Chuck Fairbanks shut off phones in the football dormitory while Nebraska brought its own provisions to Norman to avoid the risk of food poisoning.

Nebraska, unbeaten for twenty-nine games, took a 7–0 lead after a seventy-two-yard punt return by Johnny Rodgers. The return became the game's signature moment due to play-by-play announcer Lyell Bremser's radio call: "holy moly! Man, woman, and child did that put 'em in the aisles! Johnny "The Jet" Rodgers just tore 'em loose from their shoes!" Oklahoma's wishbone attack was initially stymied by All-American nose guard Rich Glover, who finished with twenty-two tackles, but scored twice late in the second quarter to take a 17–14 halftime lead; two short Jeff Kinney touchdowns put NU back in front in the third. Kiffin succeeded in limiting star Sooner running back Greg Pruitt throughout the afternoon, but quarterback Jack Mildren totaled 267 yards of offense and four touchdowns, the last of which gave Oklahoma a fourth-quarter lead. Tagge led Nebraska on a twelve-play drive capped by Kinney's fourth touchdown with 1:38 remaining and Nebraska won 35–31. Sportswriter Dan Jenkins suggested postgame "it was the greatest collegiate football battle ever," a sentiment that has been maintained since. The game – which featured 829 offensive yards, four lead changes, and just two penalties – was viewed by fifty-five million people in the United States, the largest college football audience ever.

Nebraska beat Alabama 38–6 in the Orange Bowl to defend its national title, becoming the first champion to defeat the No. 2 (Oklahoma), No. 3 (Colorado), and No. 4 (Alabama) finishers in the AP poll. NU's 1971 team is considered among the best in college football history. Devaney planned to retire but was convinced to return in 1972 to try for an unprecedented third straight title. He named Osborne his successor prior to the season and players later suggested the "murky" chain of command may have hindered the team, which saw its thirty-two-game unbeaten streak end in a week-one upset at UCLA. Persistent turnover issues – eight in a tie against Iowa State and six in a three-point loss to Oklahoma (Note: In early 1973, Oklahoma forfeited eight wins from the previous season when it was discovered the Sooners had used players ineligible under NCAA rules, which gave second-place Nebraska the 1972 Big Eight title. Decades later, Oklahoma reversed course and recognized these wins. Both schools claim the championship.) – cost Nebraska any shot at another championship. After the regular season, Rodgers was named the first Heisman Trophy winner in school history and NU beat Notre Dame 40–6 in the Orange Bowl in Devaney's final game as head coach.

Devaney ended his career with eight Big Eight championships and a 136–30–7 record, the 11th-highest winning percentage in major college football history. His program produced eighteen All-Americans in his eleven years including Rodgers, 1971 Outland Trophy winner Larry Jacobson, and 1972 Outland and Lombardi Award winner Rich Glover. He was inducted into the College Football Hall of Fame in 1982. Devaney remained at the school as athletic director until 1993 and died in 1997 at age eighty-two.

== Post-Osborne years ==
=== Solich takes over (1998–2003) ===
Frank Solich played fullback on Bob Devaney's early Nebraska teams and was an assistant under Osborne from 1979 until being named his successor. Nebraska won Solich's first five games, including a 56–27 victory over Louisiana Tech in which Bulldogs wide receiver Troy Edwards set an NCAA record with 405 receiving yards. Three late-season losses meant Nebraska failed to win the Big 12 North for the first time, and a Holiday Bowl defeat to Arizona gave NU its most losses since 1968. Sophomore quarterback Eric Crouch won the starting job early in 1999 and became one of the sport's most electrifying players, but NU relied on its defense to aid an inconsistent and turnover-prone offense. Nebraska survived several close games – seven-point victories over Southern Miss and 3–5 Kansas, and an overtime win at Colorado – to finish 12–1, avenging its only loss in the Big 12 championship game. McBride retired after the season and linebackers coach Craig Bohl was named his replacement.

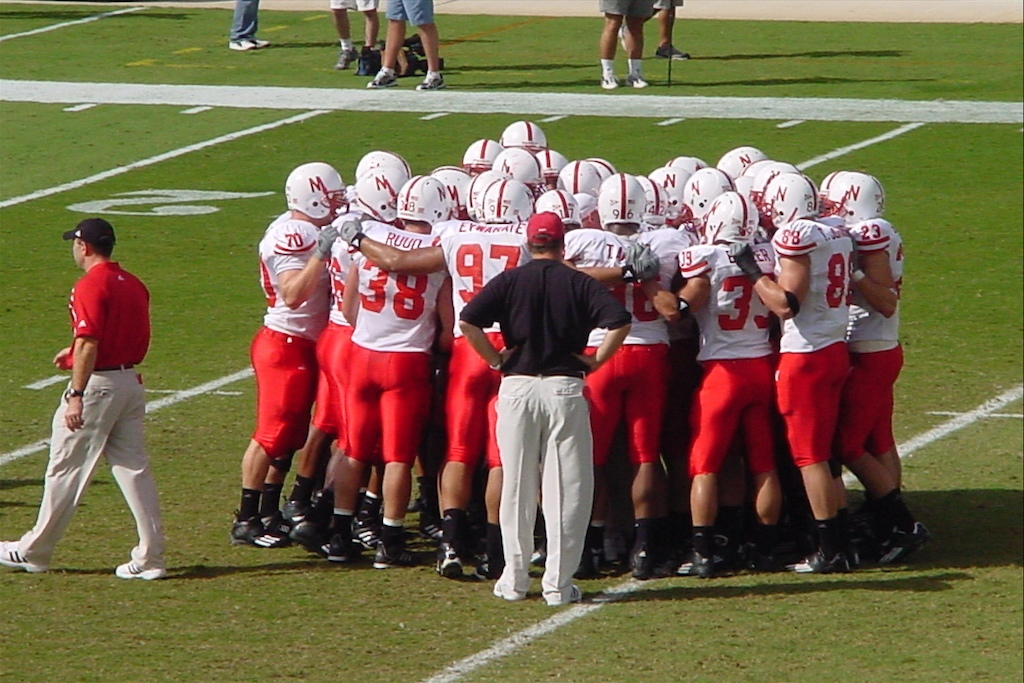
Nebraska players huddle before a game against Texas at Darrell K Royal–Texas Memorial Stadium on Nov. 1, 2003

Nebraska opened 2000 ranked first nationally and stayed there for most of the season, but a late October loss to eventual national champion Oklahoma knocked NU out of title contention. NU and OU met again in 2001 in the first regular season No. 1 versus No. 2 game in BCS history. (Note: Oklahoma was ranked first and Nebraska second by the BCS, but both were ranked behind eventual national champion Miami in the AP and Coaches polls.) NU won 20–10 and a long touchdown pass to Crouch ("Black 41 Flash Reverse") became the iconic moment of his Heisman Trophy-winning season. Colorado beat Nebraska 62–36 in the season's final week to earn a Big 12 championship game appearance, where the Buffaloes defeated Texas. Two weeks later Nebraska was selected to face Miami in the BCS championship game despite trailing Colorado and Oregon in the AP and Coaches polls; the Hurricanes dominated and won 37–14.

Crouch graduated and Nebraska went 7–7 in 2002, falling out of the AP poll for the first time since October 11, 1981 after a loss at Iowa State that ended an NCAA-record streak of 348 weeks in the national top twenty-five. Solich made aggressive staff changes after the season, firing Bohl and two other defensive assistants. He also named Barney Cotton offensive coordinator, the program's first since 1978 (Osborne and Solich served as their own offensive coordinator for most of their tenures). Nebraska improved in 9–3 in 2003 but lost 31–7 to Texas and 38–9 to Kansas State. New athletic director Steve Pederson fired Solich, infamously stating he would not "let Nebraska gravitate into mediocrity" or "surrender the Big 12 to Oklahoma and Texas." First-year defensive coordinator Bo Pelini served as interim head coach in a 17–3 win in the 2003 Alamo Bowl. Solich was so upset with his alma mater and longtime employer that he did not return to Lincoln for sixteen years.

=== Program upheaval (2004–2007) ===
Pederson conducted a sweeping coaching search that lasted forty-one days and included interviews with Pelini, Green Bay Packers head coach Mike Sherman, and Kansas City Chiefs offensive coordinator Al Saunders. More than a month into the search, he sent a university jet to Fayetteville with the expectation Arkansas head coach Houston Nutt would travel back to Lincoln to negotiate a contract to make him college football's highest-paid coach; Nutt declined to board the flight and Pederson was forced to start over. After Dallas Cowboys defensive coordinator Mike Zimmer removed his name from consideration, the search ended with the hiring of Bill Callahan, who had recently been fired as head coach of the Oakland Raiders.

Pederson's search focused primarily on NFL coaches because of his desire to "modernize" the program, especially on offense. The hiring of Callahan represented an abrupt departure from many traditions – within months, he trimmed over sixty players from NU's roster, mostly walk-ons, and his pass-heavy West Coast offense meant abandoning the I formation used for decades under Devaney, Osborne, and Solich. Quarterback Joe Dailey set nearly every school passing record in Callahan's debut season, which was otherwise disastrous – Nebraska lost at home to Southern Miss and allowed seventy points to Texas Tech, finishing 5–6 to end an NCAA-record thirty-five-year bowl streak. Callahan was considered an elite recruiter (Pederson, a former recruiting director, made this a priority), and despite underwhelming results early in his tenure, his first class was ranked in the national top five.

Callahan's offense improved over the following years under the guidance of Wake Forest transfer Zac Taylor. Nebraska returned to postseason play in 2005, winning a controversial Alamo Bowl in which Nebraska players and staff celebrated on the field while Michigan's final play was still ongoing. Taylor was named Big 12 Offensive Player of the Year in 2006 as NU won the Big 12 North for the first time since 2001; the Cornhuskers lost both of their postseason games to finish 9–5.

By 2007 the relationship between Callahan and Nebraska fans was deteriorating. A series of well-publicized gaffes – he referred to Oklahoma fans as "fucking hillbillies," made a throat-slashing gesture at an official, and declined to answer a reporter's question because it was "too technical for you" – led Callahan to isolate himself from the public spotlight. Nebraska was ranked as high as fourteenth early in 2007 but a five-game losing streak sealed Callahan's fate. Pederson was fired in October and Osborne, who had retired from Congress to make an unsuccessful bid for governor, became athletic director. Coordinator Kevin Cosgrove's defense allowed more than forty points six times, including a 76–39 loss to Kansas, and Osborne fired Callahan after a season-ending 65–51 loss to Colorado.

=== Bo Pelini (2008–2014) ===
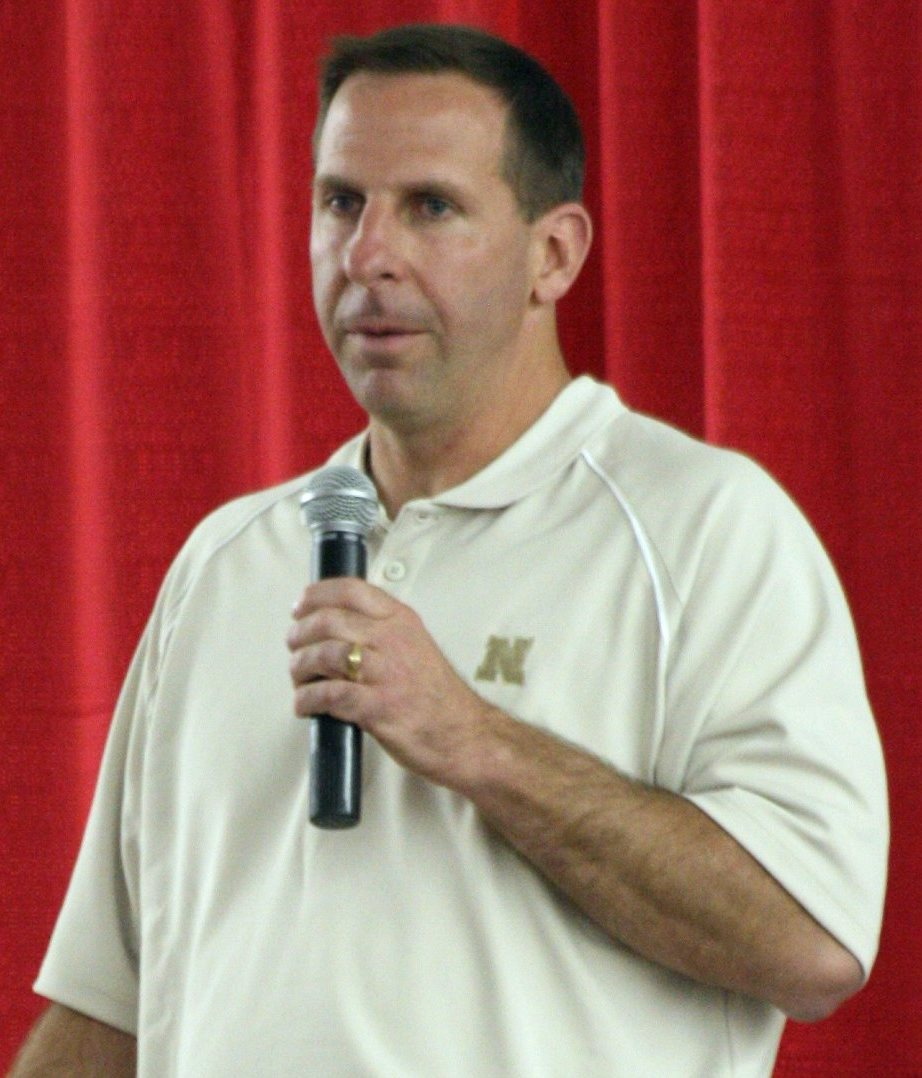
Bo Pelini in 2008

Osborne's coaching search quickly turned to LSU defensive coordinator Bo Pelini, who was popular with Nebraska fans as an assistant. Pelini was officially hired in early December but was allowed to stay in Baton Rouge and coach the 2008 BCS National Championship Game. Pelini hired his brother Carl from Frank Solich's Ohio staff to serve as defensive coordinator and retained offensive coordinator Shawn Watson. Watson used a simplified version of Callahan's complex West Coast scheme, an offense that carried NU to nine wins in Pelini's first season.

Pelini dramatically improved Nebraska's defense in just two seasons, allowing an NCAA-best 10.4 points per game in 2009. The unit was led by interior lineman Ndamukong Suh, who won several major postseason awards and finished fourth in Heisman Trophy voting. Nebraska won the Big 12 North and met No. 2 Texas in the Big 12 championship game, with the Longhorns needing a win to remain in national title contention. Suh sacked Colt McCoy 4.5 times and Nebraska led 12–10 when the clock expired on a McCoy incomplete pass. Officials added one second to the clock, allowing Texas to kick a game-winning field goal. As Pelini departed the field he accused the Big 12 officiating crew of ruling in Texas's favor to ensure conference representation in the BCS championship game, a sentiment he maintained years later. Nebraska beat Arizona 33–0 in the 2009 Holiday Bowl, after which Pelini declared "Nebraska's back and we're here to stay."

In July 2010 Nebraska announced it would join the Big Ten in 2011, beginning a wave of conference realignment that also saw longtime rivals Colorado and Missouri depart the Big 12. Nebraska began its final Big 12 season 5–0 and ranked as high as fifth nationally behind freshman dual-threat quarterback Taylor Martinez, a dynamic but inconsistent athlete who was benched in an upset loss to Texas in October. NU finished the regular season 10–2 despite ranking last in the country in turnover margin and being called for nearly twice as many penalties as its opponents. Oklahoma defeated Nebraska 23–20 in the Big 12 title game, the final meeting between NU and OU as conference opponents.

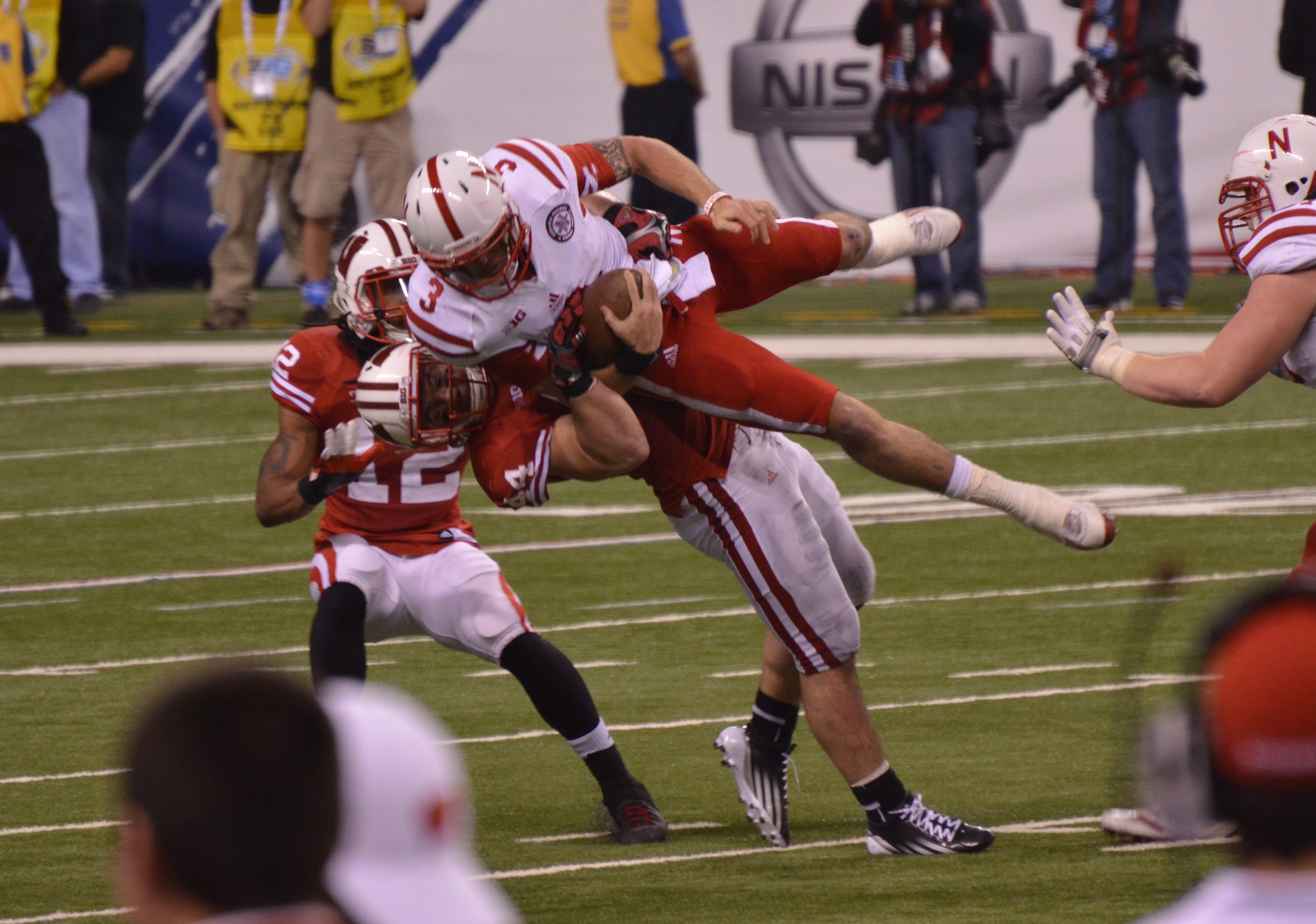
Wisconsin linebacker Chris Borland tackles Nebraska quarterback Taylor Martinez during the Big Ten championship game at Lucas Oil Stadium on Dec. 1, 2012

In 2011 Nebraska traveled to Madison for its Big Ten debut; Wisconsin dominated the top-ten matchup and won 48–17. NU hosted Ohio State the following week and the Memorial Stadium crowd became restless when NU fell behind 27–6 in the third quarter – though his team came from behind to win, Pelini attacked players, students, and fans in a profanity-laced postgame tirade that was secretly recorded. The audio was not leaked until September 2013; Pelini apologized but chancellor Harvey Perlman and new athletic director Shawn Eichorst, hired when Osborne retired earlier in the year, publicly reprimanded him. It came days after Nebraska blew an eighteen-point lead and lost 41–21 to UCLA, the type of loss that had become customary under Pelini. Over his last four seasons NU was 4–10 against ranked opponents with eight double-digit losses, in addition to a 70–31 loss to unranked Wisconsin in the 2012 Big Ten championship game.

Nebraska replaced four-year starter Martinez in 2014, starting 8–1 behind running back Ameer Abdullah's 1,611 rushing yards and twenty-two touchdowns. Pelini's team again struggled late, losing by five touchdowns to Wisconsin and falling at home to Minnesota. Eichorst fired Pelini the day after an overtime win over Iowa, which replaced Colorado (and earlier Oklahoma) as Nebraska's traditional Black Friday opponent. Pelini won nine or ten games in each of his seven seasons in Lincoln and departed with a 67–27 record, the third-most wins in school history. Eichorst cited Pelini's poor record in important games and a pattern of unprofessional behavior as contributing factors to his dismissal. Two days after his firing, Pelini met with the team at Lincoln North Star High School and slammed Eichorst: "a guy like him who has no integrity, he doesn't even understand what a core value is. That's all he's done since he's been here: hire people and make policies to cover his own ass." Pelini returned to his home state of Ohio to coach at Youngstown State.

=== Big Ten struggles and bowl drought (2015–present) ===
Eichorst conducted a brief and secretive coaching search, hiring Oregon State's Mike Riley four days after firing Pelini. The surprise selection of Riley was generally considered underwhelming but Eichorst valued Riley's friendly, level-headed reputation, a stark contrast to Pelini's sharp and fiery demeanor.

Nebraska lost to BYU in Riley's debut on a forty-two-yard Hail Mary as time expired, the program's first season-opening defeat since 1985, and finished 5–7 despite giving College Football Playoff participant Michigan State its only regular season loss. Because not all eighty bowl spots were filled, the Cornhuskers were considered bowl-eligible and defeated UCLA in the Foster Farms Bowl. In July 2016, Nebraska punter Sam Foltz was killed in a single-car crash while returning from a specialists clinic in Wisconsin. The team memorialized Foltz during its first punt of the season, lining up in a ten-player formation with no punter to receive the snap; many of Nebraska's opponents offered tributes as well. Nebraska entered the national top ten partway through 2016 but lost four of its final six games to finish 9–4; NU's Music City Bowl loss to Tennessee was the program's last bowl game appearance until 2024.

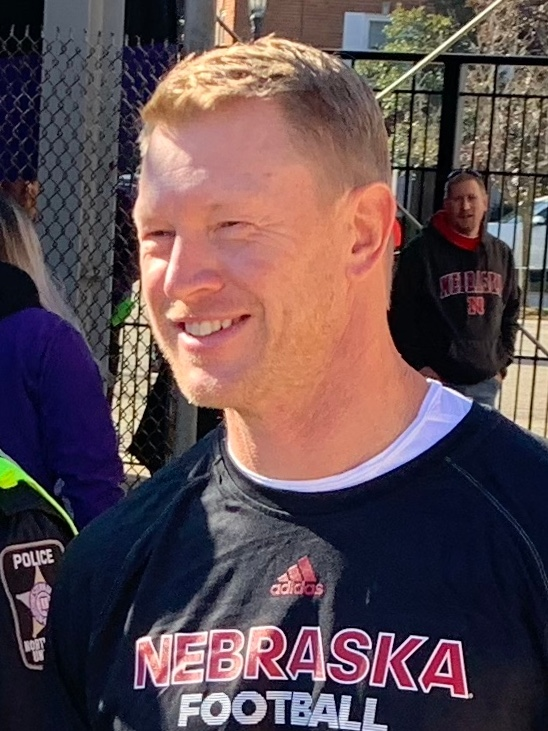
Scott Frost in 2018

Perlman, who had served as university chancellor since 2000 and was often blamed for the downturn of the school's football program, retired in July 2016. He acknowledged shortcomings during his sixteen-year tenure, but defended his selections of Pederson and Eichorst as athletic directors as well as his controversial handling of head coaches Solich and Pelini. New chancellor Ronnie D. Green fired Eichorst early in 2017 following a home loss to Northern Illinois, and Riley was fired the day after finishing a 4–8 season that was NU's worst since 1961. Nebraska moved quickly to hire alumnus Scott Frost, who had just led UCF to an undefeated season.

Despite his experience as an I-formation quarterback, Frost coached an up-tempo spread offense he took from his time as a Chip Kelly assistant at Oregon. Frost named true freshman Adrian Martinez his starting quarterback days prior to Nebraska's scheduled season opener against Akron, which was canceled due to weather. Colorado upset Nebraska the following week, the first of six consecutive losses to begin Frost's highly anticipated tenure. NU won four of its last six games and Stanley Morgan Jr., who broke Johnny Rodgers's longstanding receiving record in 2017, became the first Nebraska receiver to reach 1,000 yards in a season.

Nebraska opened 2019 ranked in both the AP and Coaches polls with the expectation the team would improve significantly in Frost's second year, as his UCF program had done, but the Cornhuskers finished 5–7 and missed a bowl game for the third consecutive season. NU struggled through a 2020 season abridged due to the COVID-19 pandemic and a 2021 season in which it lost an NCAA-record nine games by ten points or fewer. Martinez transferred to Kansas State instead of returning for his fifth season as a starter and Frost was fired three games into 2022, ending his tenure with the second-lowest win percentage among coaches to lead NU for three years or more.

Nebraska hired former Temple and Baylor coach Matt Rhule to replace Frost, signing him to a contract among the most lucrative in college football. (Note: Rhule filed an arbitration claim in February 2023 against the Carolina Panthers, his former employer, when the team withheld payments from his approximately $40-million buyout. The Panthers claimed his backloaded Nebraska contract was structured to maximize buyout potential and violated NFL anti-tampering rules, in which case Rhule would be owed nothing.) NU ended its eight-year bowl drought in 2024, defeating Boston College in the Pinstripe Bowl.
