= List of Iowa Hawkeyes football seasons =

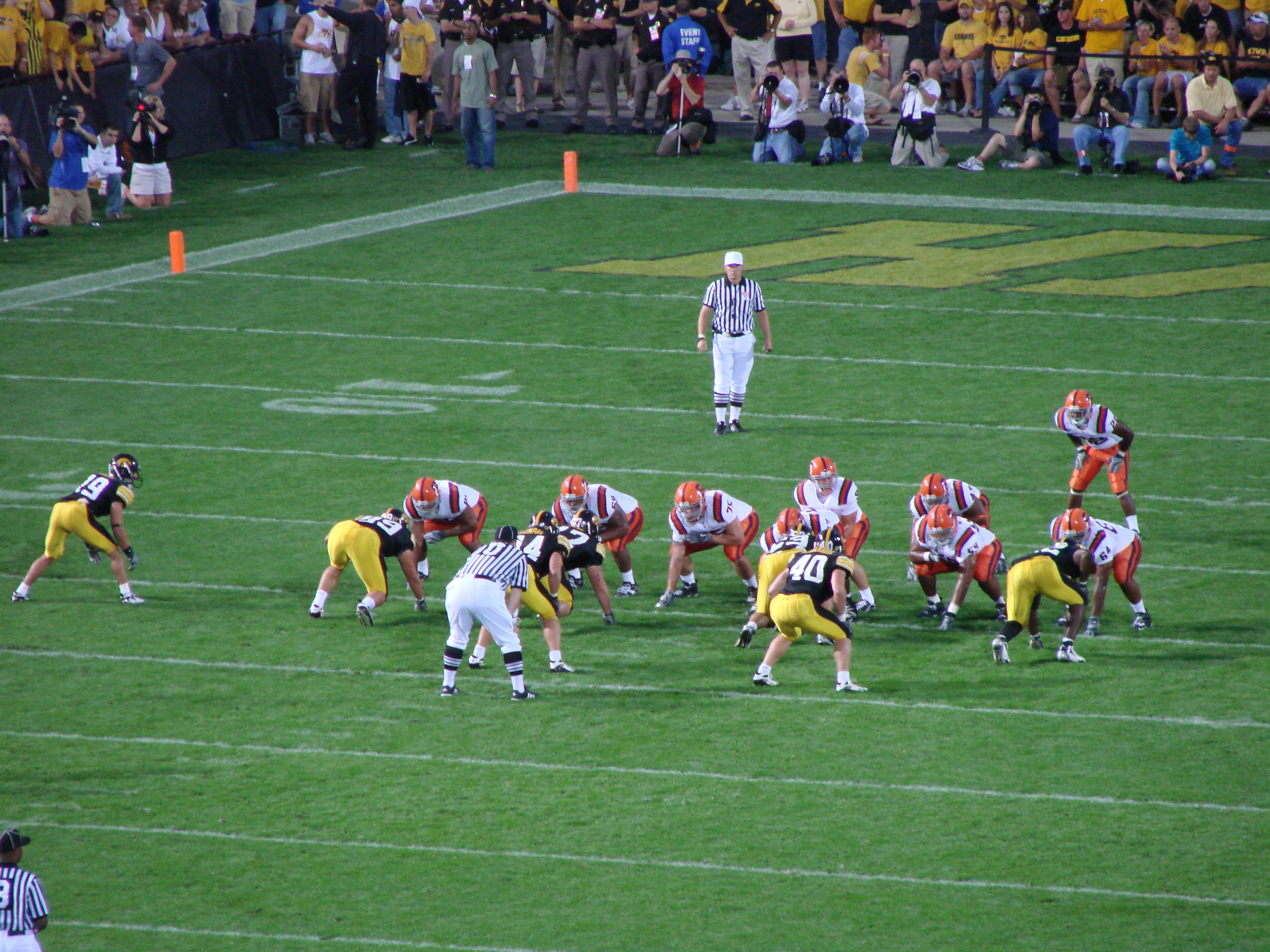
Iowa's defense lines up against Syracuse on September 8, 2007.

This is a list of seasons completed by the Iowa Hawkeyes football program since the team's inception in 1889. The list documents season-by-season records, and conference records from 1892 to 1896 and 1900 to the present. The Hawkeyes began playing football as a club sport in 1872, and began playing intramural games against other colleges in 1882, but it was not until 1889 when Iowa challenged Iowa College to an interscholastic varsity football game. Since then, the Hawkeyes have played over 1,200 games, including 30 bowl games.

Historically, Iowa has seen moderate success. The Hawkeyes won the Western Interstate University Football Association championship in 1896 and the Big Ten Conference football championship in 1900 – the school's first year as a member of the Big Ten Conference – but did not win another in the Big Ten until 1921. Iowa's coach at that time was Howard Jones. Under his direction, the Hawkeyes won conference championships in 1921 and 1922, and recorded a school-record 20-game winning streak from 1920 to 1923. However, the Hawkeyes' success on the field dipped once again. Debt on Iowa's new football stadium – Iowa Stadium – grew yearly, and the Hawkeyes finished in the bottom three of the Big Ten every year except 1933 from 1930 to 1938. Then, in 1939, Iowa surprisingly finished the season 6–1–1, tripling the win total from the last two seasons combined. The team was nicknamed the "Ironmen," and is generally thought to be one of the greatest teams in school history. They were led by Heisman winner Nile Kinnick, who died in 1943 during a World War II training flight. 29 years later, in 1972, Iowa Stadium was renamed as "Kinnick Stadium" in his honor.

Following the 1939 season, the Hawkeyes slipped into another "down period." From 1940 to 1955, Iowa recorded 11 losing seasons, and their best finish in the Big Ten was fourth. But in 1952, the Hawkeyes upset Ohio State in Forest Evashevski's first season as coach. Three years later, in 1956, the Hawkeyes won the Big Ten championship with a 9–1 record. Under Evashevski, Iowa won two more conference championships in 1958 and 1960, posting 8–1–1 and 8–1 records respectively. In 1958, the Hawkeyes were awarded the Grantland Rice Trophy as national champions of the Football Writers Association of America. Soon thereafter, however, Evashevski became athletic director, and the football program suffered. The team posted a winning record in 1961 under new head coach Jerry Burns, but it was Iowa's last winning season until 1981. From 1961 to 1978, the Hawkeyes had four head coaches. Not one of them had a team that finished better than fourth in the Big Ten.

In 1979, Hayden Fry was hired as Iowa's 24th head coach. In 1981, he took the Hawkeyes to their first Rose Bowl since 1958. Iowa won the Big Ten championship three times under Fry, and played in the Rose Bowl in each of those seasons. Following his tenure at Iowa, which ended after the 1998 season, Kirk Ferentz was hired as his successor. Ferentz has won Big Ten championships twice at Iowa, in 2002 and 2004.

== Seasons ==
Year	Coach	Overall	Conference	Standing	Bowl/playoffs	Coaches^{#}	AP^{°}
Independent (1889–1891)
1889	No coach	0–1					
1890	No coach	1–1					
1891	No coach	3–2 (Note: The outcome of Iowa's game vs. Kansas in 1891 was disputed. Iowa lists the game as an 18–14 Hawkeye victory, because Kansas left the field before the final play of the game. Iowa scored a touchdown and then the game was over. Kansas lists the game as a 14–12 victory.)					
Edwin A. Dalton (Western Interstate University Football Association) (1892)
1892	Edwin A. Dalton	3–2–1	0–2–1	4th			
Ben Donnelly (Western Interstate University Football Association) (1893)
1893	Ben Donnelly	3–4	1–2	T–3rd			
Roger Sherman (Western Interstate University Football Association) (1894)
1894	Roger Sherman	4–4–1	1–2	T–3rd			
1895	No coach	4–4–1	1–2	T–3rd			
Alfred E. Bull (Western Interstate University Football Association) (1896)
1896	Alfred E. Bull	7–1–1	2–0–1	1st			
Otto Wagonhurst (Western Interstate University Football Association) (1897)
1897	Otto Wagonhurst	4–4	0–2	T–3rd			
Alden Knipe (Independent) (1898–1899)
1898	Alden Knipe	3–4–2					
1899	Alden Knipe	8–0–1					
Alden Knipe (Western Conference) (1900–1902)
1900	Alden Knipe	7–0–1	2–0–1	T–1st			
1901	Alden Knipe	6–3	0–3	9th			
1902	Alden Knipe	5–4	0–3	7th			
John Chalmers (Western Conference) (1903–1905)
1903	John Chalmers	9–2	1–1	5th			
1904	John Chalmers	7–4	0–3	T–7th			
1905	John Chalmers	8–2	0–2	T–7th			
Mark Catlin Sr. (Western Conference) (1906–1908)
1906	Mark Catlin Sr.	2–3	0–1	6th			
Mark Catlin Sr. (Western Conference / MVIAA) (1907–1908)
1907	Mark Catlin Sr.	3–2	1–1 / 1–0	4th / T–1st			
1908	Mark Catlin Sr.	2–5	0–1 / 0–4–0	6th / 7th			
John G. Griffith (Western Conference / MVIAA) (1909)
1909	John G. Griffith	2–4–1	0–1 / 1–3–1	7th / 4th			
Jesse Hawley (Western Conference / MVIAA) (1910)
1910	Jesse Hawley	5–2	1–1 / 3–1	4th / 2nd			
Jesse Hawley (Western Conference) (1911–1915)
1911	Jesse Hawley	3–4	2–2	5th			
1912	Jesse Hawley	4–3	1–3	7th			
1913	Jesse Hawley	5–2	2–1	T–2nd			
1914	Jesse Hawley	4–3	1–2	7th			
1915	Jesse Hawley	3–4	1–2	7th			
Howard Jones (Western Conference) (1916–1923)
1916	Howard Jones	4–3	1–2	6th			
1917	Howard Jones	3–5	0–2	T–9th			
1918	Howard Jones	6–2–1	2–1	T–4th			
1919	Howard Jones	5–2	2–2	6th			
1920	Howard Jones	5–2	3–2	5th			
1921	Howard Jones	7–0	5–0	1st			
1922	Howard Jones	7–0	5–0	T–1st			
1923	Howard Jones	5–3	3–3	T–5th			
Burt Ingwersen (Big Ten Conference) (1924–1931)
1924	Burt Ingwersen	6–1–1	3–1–1	T–2nd			
1925	Burt Ingwersen	5–3	2–2	T–4th			
1926	Burt Ingwersen	3–5	0–5	T–9th			
1927	Burt Ingwersen	4–4	1–4	T–9th			
1928	Burt Ingwersen	6–2	3–2	T–4th			
1929	Burt Ingwersen	4–2–2	2–2–2	5th			
1930	Burt Ingwersen	4–4	0–1	T–9th			
1931	Burt Ingwersen	1–6–1	0–3–1	9th			
Ossie Solem (Big Ten Conference) (1932–1936)
1932	Ossie Solem	1–7	0–5	10th			
1933	Ossie Solem	5–3	3–2	T–5th			
1934	Ossie Solem	2–5–1	1–3–1	T–8th			
1935	Ossie Solem	4–2–2	1–2–2	8th			
1936	Ossie Solem	3–4–1	0–4–1	8th			
Irl Tubbs (Big Ten Conference) (1937–1938)
1937	Irl Tubbs	1–7	0–5	10th			
1938	Irl Tubbs	1–6–1	1–3–1	8th			
Eddie Anderson (Big Ten Conference) (1939–1942)
1939	Eddie Anderson	6–1–1	4–1–1	2nd			9
1940	Eddie Anderson	4–4	2–3	T–6th			
1941	Eddie Anderson	3–5	2–4	6th			
1942	Eddie Anderson	6–4	3–3	T–5th			
Slip Madigan (Big Ten Conference) (1943–1944)
1943	Slip Madigan	1–6–1	0–4–1	9th			
1944	Slip Madigan	1–7	0–6	9th			
Clem Crowe (Big Ten Conference) (1945)
1945	Clem Crowe	2–7	1–5	T–8th			
Eddie Anderson (Big Ten Conference) (1946–1949)
1946	Eddie Anderson	5–4	3–3	4th			
1947	Eddie Anderson	3–5–1	2–3–1	T–6th			
1948	Eddie Anderson	4–5	2–4	T–5th			
1949	Eddie Anderson	4–5	3–3	T–5th			
Leonard Raffensperger (Big Ten Conference) (1950–1951)
1950	Leonard Raffensperger	3–5–1	2–4	6th			
1951	Leonard Raffensperger	2–5–2	0–5–1	9th			
Forest Evashevski (Big Ten Conference) (1952–1960)
1952	Forest Evashevski	2–7	2–5	T–6th			
1953	Forest Evashevski	5–3–1	3–3	T–5th		10	9
1954	Forest Evashevski	5–4	4–3	5th			
1955	Forest Evashevski	3–5–1	2–3–1	7th		19	
1956	Forest Evashevski	9–1	5–1	1st	W Rose	3	3
1957	Forest Evashevski	7–1–1	4–1–1	3rd		5	6
1958	Forest Evashevski	8–1–1	5–1	1st	W Rose	2	2
1959	Forest Evashevski	5–4	3–3	6th			
1960	Forest Evashevski	8–1	5–1	T–1st		2	3
Jerry Burns (Big Ten Conference) (1961–1965)
1961	Jerry Burns	5–4	2–4	T–7th			
1962	Jerry Burns	4–5	3–3	T–5th			
1963	Jerry Burns	3–3–2	2–3–1	8th			
1964	Jerry Burns	3–6	1–5	T–9th			
1965	Jerry Burns	1–9	0–7	10th			
Ray Nagel (Big Ten Conference) (1966–1970)
1966	Ray Nagel	2–8	1–6	10th			
1967	Ray Nagel	1–8–1	0–6–1	T–9th			
1968	Ray Nagel	5–5	4–3	T–5th			
1969	Ray Nagel	5–5	3–4	T–5th			
1970	Ray Nagel	3–6–1	3–3–1	4th			
Frank Lauterbur (Big Ten Conference) (1971–1973)
1971	Frank Lauterbur	1–10	1–8	10th			
1972	Frank Lauterbur	3–7–1	2–6–1	8th			
1973	Frank Lauterbur	0–11	0–8	T–9th			
Bob Commings (Big Ten Conference) (1974–1978)
1974	Bob Commings	3–8	2–6	T–7th			
1975	Bob Commings	3–8	3–5	T–7th			
1976	Bob Commings	5–6	3–5	T–7th			
1977	Bob Commings	5–6 (Note: In 1977, Iowa lost to UCLA 34–16. However, UCLA later forfeited the game, giving Iowa a 5–6 final record.)	3–5	T–6th			
1978	Bob Commings	2–9	2–6	8th			
Hayden Fry (Big Ten Conference) (1979–1998)
1979	Hayden Fry	5–6	4–4	5th			
1980	Hayden Fry	4–7	4–4	4th			
1981	Hayden Fry	8–4	6–2	T–1st	L Rose	15	18
1982	Hayden Fry	8–4	6–2	3rd	W Peach		
1983	Hayden Fry	9–3	7–2	3rd	L Gator	14	14
1984	Hayden Fry	8–4–1	5–3–1	T–4th	W Freedom	15	16
1985	Hayden Fry	10–2	7–1	1st	L Rose	9	10
1986	Hayden Fry	9–3	5–3	T–3rd	W Holiday	15	16
1987	Hayden Fry	10–3	6–2	T–2nd	W Holiday	16	16
1988	Hayden Fry	6–4–3	4–1–3	4th	L Peach		
1989	Hayden Fry	5–6	3–5	T–6th			
1990	Hayden Fry	8–4	6–2	T–1st	L Rose	16	18
1991	Hayden Fry	10–1–1	7–1	2nd	T Holiday	10	10
1992	Hayden Fry	5–7	4–4	5th			
1993	Hayden Fry	6–6	3–5	8th	L Alamo		
1994	Hayden Fry	5–5–1	3–4–1	7th			
1995	Hayden Fry	8–4	4–4	6th	W Sun	22	25
1996	Hayden Fry	9–3	6–2	T–3rd	W Alamo	18	18
1997	Hayden Fry	7–5	4–4	T–6th	L Sun		
1998	Hayden Fry	3–8	2–6	T–7th			
Kirk Ferentz (Big Ten Conference) (1999–present)
1999	Kirk Ferentz	1–10	0–8	11th			
2000	Kirk Ferentz	3–9	3–5	8th			
2001	Kirk Ferentz	7–5	4–4	T–4th	W Alamo		
2002	Kirk Ferentz	11–2	8–0	T–1st	L Orange^{†}	8	8
2003	Kirk Ferentz	10–3	5–3	T–4th	W Outback	8	8
2004	Kirk Ferentz	10–2	7–1	T–1st	W Capital One	8	8
2005	Kirk Ferentz	7–5	5–3	T–3rd	L Outback		
2006	Kirk Ferentz	6–7	2–6	T–8th	L Alamo		
2007	Kirk Ferentz	6–6	4–4	T–5th			
2008	Kirk Ferentz	9–4	5–3	T–4th	W Outback	20	20
2009	Kirk Ferentz	11–2	6–2	T–2nd	W Orange^{†}	7	7
2010	Kirk Ferentz	8–5	4–4	T–4th	W Insight		
2011	Kirk Ferentz	7–6	4–4	4th (Legends)	L Insight		
2012	Kirk Ferentz	4–8	2–6	T–5th (Legends)			
2013	Kirk Ferentz	8–5	5–3	T–2nd (Legends)	L Outback		
2014	Kirk Ferentz	7–6	4–4	4th (West)	L TaxSlayer		
2015	Kirk Ferentz	12–2	8–0	1st (West)	L Rose^{†}	10	9
2016	Kirk Ferentz	8–5	6–3	T–2nd (West)	L Outback		
2017	Kirk Ferentz	8–5	4–5	T–3rd (West)	W Pinstripe		
2018	Kirk Ferentz	9–4	5–4	T–2nd (West)	W Outback		25
2019	Kirk Ferentz	10–3	6–3	3rd (West)	W Holiday	15	15
2020	Kirk Ferentz	6–2	6–2	2nd (West)	CX Music City (Note: The 2020 Music City Bowl was canceled due to COVID-19 issues.)	15	16
2021	Kirk Ferentz	10–4	7–2	1st (West)	L Citrus	23	23
2022	Kirk Ferentz	8–5	5–4	T–2nd (West)	W Music City		
2023	Kirk Ferentz	6–4	6–2	1st (West)	L Citrus	22	24
2024	Kirk Ferentz	8–5	6–3	T–5th	L Music City		
2025	Kirk Ferentz	9–4	6–3	6th	W ReliaQuest	17	17
2026	Kirk Ferentz	9–2	6–2				
Total:		718–587–39					
National championship Conference title Conference division title or championship game berth
^{†}Indicates Bowl Coalition, Bowl Alliance, BCS, or CFP / New Years' Six bowl.; ^{#}Rankings from final Coaches Poll.
