= List of Missouri Tigers football seasons =

List of Missouri Tigers football annual records since inception in 1890.

== Year-by-year record ==
Year	Coach	Overall	Conference	Standing	Bowl/playoffs	Coaches^{#}	AP^{°}
A. L. McRae (Independent) (1890)
1890	A. L. McRae	2–1					
Hal Reed (Independent) (1891)
1891	Hal Reid	3–1					
E.H. Jones (WIUFA) (1892)
1892	E.H. Jones	1–2	1–2	3rd			
Harry O. Robinson (WIUFA) (1893–1894)
1893	Harry Robinson	4–3	2–1	T–1st			
1894	Harry Robinson	4–3	2–1	T–1st			
Pop Bliss (WIUFA) (1895)
1895	Pop Bliss	7–1	2–1	T–1st			
Frank Patterson (WIUFA) (1896)
1896	Frank Patterson	7–5	0–3	4th			
Charles Young (WIUFA) (1897)
1897	Charles Young	5–6	0–2	4th			
Dave Fultz (Independent) (1898–1899)
1898	Dave Fultz	1–4–1					
1899	Dave Fultz	9–2					
Fred Murphy (Independent) (1900–1901)
1900	Fred Murphy	4–4–1					
1901	Fred Murphy	2–6–1					
Pat O'Dea (Independent) (1902)
1902	Pat O'Dea	5–3					
John McLean (Independent) (1903–1905)
1903	John McLean	1–7–1					
1904	John McLean	3–6					
1905	John McLean	5–4					
W.J. Monilaw (Independent) (1906)
1906	W.J. Monilaw	5–2–1					
W.J. Monilaw (Missouri Valley) (1907–1908)
1907	W.J. Monilaw	7–2	1–2	4th			
1908	W.J. Monilaw	6–2	3–2	4th			
Bill Roper (Missouri Valley) (1909)
1909	Bill Roper	7–0–1	4–0–1	1st			
Bill Hollenback (Missouri Valley) (1910)
1910	Bill Hollenback	4–2–2	2–1–1	3rd			
Chester Brewer (Missouri Valley) (1911–1913)
1911	Chester Brewer	2–4–2	0–2–2	5th			
1912	Chester Brewer	5–3	2–3	4th			
1913	Chester Brewer	7–1	4–0	T–1st			
Henry Schulte (Missouri Valley) (1914–1917)
1914	Henry Schulte	5–3	4–1	2nd			
1915	Henry Schulte	2–5–1	1–3–1	5th			
1916	Henry Schulte	6–1–1	3–1–1	2nd			
1917	Henry Schulte	3–5	2–4	5th			
1918	No team						
John F. Miller (Missouri Valley) (1919)
1919	John F. Miller	5–1–2	4–0–1	1st			
James Phelan (Missouri Valley) (1920)
1920	James Phelan	7–1	5–1	2nd			
1921	James Phelan	6–2	4–2	T-2nd			
Thomas Kelly (Missouri Valley) (1922)
1922	Thomas Kelly	5–3	4–3	4th			
Gwinn Henry (Missouri Valley / Big Six) (1923–1931)
1923	Gwinn Henry	2–3–3	1–3–2	7th			
1924	Gwinn Henry	7–2	5–1	1st	L Christmas Festival		
1925	Gwinn Henry	6–1–1	5–1	1st			
1926	Gwinn Henry	5–1–2	4–1	3rd			
1927	Gwinn Henry	7–2	5–1	1st			
1928	Gwinn Henry	4–4	3–2	T–2nd			
1929	Gwinn Henry	5–2–1	3–1–1	2nd			
1930	Gwinn Henry	2–5–2	1–2–2	5th			
1931	Gwinn Henry	2–8	1–4	T–5th			
Frank Carideo (Big Six) (1932–1934)
1932	Frank Carideo	1–7–1	1–3–1	5th			
1933	Frank Carideo	1–8	0–5	6th			
1934	Frank Carideo	0–8–1	0–5	6th			
Don Faurot (Big Six) (1935–1942)
1935	Don Faurot	3–3–3	0–2–3	6th			
1936	Don Faurot	6–2–1	3–1–1	2nd			
1937	Don Faurot	3–6–1	2–2–1	4th			
1938	Don Faurot	6–3	2–3	T–3rd			
1939	Don Faurot	8–2	5–0	1st	L Orange		6
1940	Don Faurot	6–3	3–2	3rd			
1941	Don Faurot	8–2	5–0	1st	L Sugar		7
1942	Don Faurot	8–3–1	4–0–1	1st			
Chauncey Simpson (Big Six) (1943–1945)
1943	Chauncey Simpson	3–5	3–2	T–2nd			
1944	Chauncey Simpson	3–5–2	2–1–2	3rd			
1945	Chauncey Simpson	6–4	5–0	1st	L Cotton		
Don Faurot (Big Six / Big Seven) (1946–1956)
1946	Don Faurot	5–4–1	3–2	T–3rd			
1947	Don Faurot	6–4	3–2	3rd			
1948	Don Faurot	8–3	5–1	2nd	L Gator		
1949	Don Faurot	7–4	5–1	2nd	L Gator		20
1950	Don Faurot	4–5–1	3–2–1	3rd			
1951	Don Faurot	3–7	2–4	T-4th			
1952	Don Faurot	5–5	5–1	2nd			
1953	Don Faurot	6–4	4–2	T–2nd			
1954	Don Faurot	4–5–1	3–2–1	T–3rd			
1955	Don Faurot	1–9	1–5	7th			
1956	Don Faurot	4–5–1	3–2–1	3rd			
Frank Broyles (Big Seven) (1957)
1957	Frank Broyles	5–4–1	3–3	T–3rd			
Dan Devine (Big Eight) (1958–1970)
1958	Dan Devine	5–4–1	4–1–1	2nd			
1959	Dan Devine	6–5	4–2	2nd	L Orange	19	18
1960	Dan Devine	11–0 (Note: Missouri lost to Kansas but was later awarded win by default due to an ineligible Kansas player, (Bert Coan). The 1960 Big Eight title was retroactively awarded to Missouri.)	6–0	1st	W Orange	4	5
1961	Dan Devine	7–2–1	5–2	T–2nd		11	
1962	Dan Devine	8–1–2	5–1–1	2nd	W Bluebonnet	12	
1963	Dan Devine	7–3	5–2	3rd		16	
1964	Dan Devine	6–3–1	4–2–1	4th		18	
1965	Dan Devine	8–2–1	6–1	2nd	W Sugar	6	6
1966	Dan Devine	6–3–1	4–2–1	3rd			
1967	Dan Devine	7–3	4–3	4th			
1968	Dan Devine	8–3	5–2	3rd	W Gator	17	9
1969	Dan Devine	9–2	6–1	T–1st	L Orange	6	6
1970	Dan Devine	5–6	3–4	T–4th			
Al Onofrio (Big Eight) (1971–1977)
1971	Al Onofrio	1–10	0–7	8th			
1972	Al Onofrio	6–6	3–4	5th	L Fiesta		
1973	Al Onofrio	8–4	3–4	4th	W Sun		17
1974	Al Onofrio	7–4	5–2	T–2nd			
1975	Al Onofrio	6–5	3–4	T–5th			
1976	Al Onofrio	6–5	3–4	6th			
1977	Al Onofrio	4–7	3–4	5th			
Warren Powers (Big Eight) (1978–1984)
1978	Warren Powers	8–4	4–3	T–3rd	W Liberty	14	15
1979	Warren Powers	7–5	3–4	4th	W Hall of Fame Classic	20	
1980	Warren Powers	8–4	5–2	3rd	L Liberty		
1981	Warren Powers	8–4	3–4	5th	W Tangerine	20	19
1982	Warren Powers	5–4–2	2–3–2	5th			
1983	Warren Powers	7–5	5–2	T–2nd	L Holiday		
1984	Warren Powers	3–7–1	2–4–1	T–5th			
Woody Widenhofer (Big Eight) (1985–1988)
1985	Woody Widenhofer	1–10	1–6	T–7th			
1986	Woody Widenhofer	3–8	2–5	6th			
1987	Woody Widenhofer	5–6	3–4	5th			
1988	Woody Widenhofer	3–7–1	2–5	6th			
Bob Stull (Big Eight) (1989–1993)
1989	Bob Stull	2–9	1–6	7th			
1990	Bob Stull	4–7	2–5	T–6th			
1991	Bob Stull	3–7–1	1–6	7th			
1992	Bob Stull	3–8	2–5	T–6th			
1993	Bob Stull	3–7–1	2–5	T–6th			
Larry Smith (Big Eight) (1994–1995)
1994	Larry Smith	3–8–1	2–5	6th			
1995	Larry Smith	3–8	1–6	T–7th			
Larry Smith (Big 12) (1996–2000)
1996	Larry Smith	5–6	3–5	4th (North)			
1997	Larry Smith	7–5	5–3	3rd (North)	L Holiday	23	23
1998	Larry Smith	8–4	5–3	T–2nd (North)	W Insight.com	25	21
1999	Larry Smith	4–7	1–7	T–5th (North)			
2000	Larry Smith	3–8	2–6	T–5th (North)			
Gary Pinkel (Big 12) (2001–2011)
2001	Gary Pinkel	4–7	3–5	T–4th (North)			
2002	Gary Pinkel	5–7	2–6	5th (North)			
2003	Gary Pinkel	8–5	4–4	3rd (North)	L Independence		
2004	Gary Pinkel	5–6	3–5	T–3rd (North)			
2005	Gary Pinkel	7–5	4–4	T–2nd (North)	W Independence		
2006	Gary Pinkel	8–5	4–4	T–2nd (North)	L Sun		
2007	Gary Pinkel	12–2	7–1	T–1st (North)	W Cotton	5	4
2008	Gary Pinkel	10–4	5–3	T–1st (North)	W Alamo	16	19
2009	Gary Pinkel	8–5	4–4	T–2nd (North)	L Texas		
2010	Gary Pinkel	10–3	6–2	T–1st (North)	L Insight	18	18
2011	Gary Pinkel (Note: Pinkel was suspended for the November 19, 2011 game versus Texas Tech.)	8–5	5–4	5th	W Independence		
Gary Pinkel (SEC) (2012–2015)
2012	Gary Pinkel	5–7	2–6	5th (Eastern)			
2013	Gary Pinkel	12–2	7–1	1st (Eastern)	W Cotton	5	5
2014	Gary Pinkel	11–3	7–1	1st (Eastern)	W Citrus	11	14
2015	Gary Pinkel	0–7 (Note: Due to NCAA sanctions, Missouri vacated wins in 2015 and 2016.)	0–7	6th (Eastern)			
Barry Odom (SEC) (2016–2019)
2016	Barry Odom	0–8	0–6	7th (Eastern)			
2017	Barry Odom	7–6	4–4	T–3rd (Eastern)	L Texas		
2018	Barry Odom	8–5	4–4	T–4th (Eastern)	L Liberty		
2019	Barry Odom	6–6	3–5	T–4th (Eastern)	Ineligible (Note: On January 31, 2019, the Tigers received a postseason ban from the NCAA for the 2019 season due to academic misconduct and providing extra benefits. The school also was placed on three years' probation and had scholarships reduced. Missouri immediately appealed the decision, but the appeal was denied.)		
Eli Drinkwitz (SEC) (2020–present)
2020	Eli Drinkwitz	5–5	5–5	3rd (Eastern)	CX Music City		
2021	Eli Drinkwitz	6–7	3–5	T–4th (Eastern)	L Armed Forces		
2022	Eli Drinkwitz	6–7	3–5	T–4th (Eastern)	L Gasparilla		
2023	Eli Drinkwitz	11–2	6–2	2nd (Eastern)	W Cotton^{†}	8	8
2024	Eli Drinkwitz	10–3	5–3	T–4th	W Music City	20	22
2025	Eli Drinkwitz	8–5	4–4	T–8th	L Gator Bowl		
2026	Eli Drinkwitz	7–4	4–4				
Total:		721–593–52					
National championship Conference title Conference division title or championship game berth
^{†}Indicates Bowl Coalition, Bowl Alliance, BCS, or CFP / New Years' Six bowl.; ^{#}Rankings from final Coaches Poll.
