= List of Iowa Hawkeyes head football coaches =

The Iowa Hawkeyes football program is a college football team that represents the University of Iowa in the Big Ten Conference in the National Collegiate Athletic Association. The program has had 25 head coaches since organized football began in 1889. Iowa has played in over 1,200 games during its 127 seasons.

== Key ==
Key to symbols in coaches list
General		Overall		Conference		Postseason (Note: Although the first Rose Bowl Game was played in 1902, it has been continuously played since the 1916 game, and is recognized as the oldest bowl game by the NCAA. "—" indicates any season prior to 1916 when postseason games were not played.)	
No.	Order of coaches (Note: A running total of the number of head coaches, with coaches who served separate tenures being counted only once. Interim head coaches are represented with "Int" and are not counted in the running total. "—" indicates the team played but either without a coach or no coach is on record. "X" indicates an interim year without play.)	GC	Games coached	CW	Conference wins	PW	Postseason wins
DC	Division championships	OW	Overall wins	CL	Conference losses	PL	Postseason losses
CC	Conference championships	OL	Overall losses	CT	Conference ties	PT	Postseason ties
NC	National championships	OT	Overall ties (Note: Overtime rules in college football were introduced in 1996, making ties impossible in the period since.)	C%	Conference winning percentage		
†	Elected to the College Football Hall of Fame	O%	Overall winning percentage (Note: When computing the win–loss percentage, a tie counts as half a win and half a loss.)				

== Coaches ==
Statistics correct as of the end of the 2025 NCAA Division I FBS football season.

No.	Name	Term	GC	OW	OL	OT	O%	CW	CL	CT	C%	PW	PL	PT	DCs	CCs	NCs	Awards
1	E. A. Dalton	1892	6	3	2	1	.583	0	2	1	.167	—	—	—	—	0	0	—
2	Ben "Sport" Donnelly	1893	7	3	4	0	.429	1	2	0	.333	—	—	—	—	0	0	—
3	Roger Sherman	1894	9	4	4	1	.500	1	2	0	.333	—	—	—	—	0	0	—
4	Alfred E. Bull	1896	9	7	1	1	.833	2	0	1	.833	—	—	—	—	1 – 1896^{1}	0	—
5	Otto Wagonhurst	1897	8	4	4	0	.500	0	2	0	.000	—	—	—	—	—	0	—
6	Alden Knipe	1899–1902	44	29	11	4	.705	2	6	1	.278	0	0	0	—	1 – 1900	0	—
7	John Chalmers	1903–1905	32	24	8	0	.750	1	6	0	.143	0	0	0	—	0	0	—
8	Mark Catlin	1906–1908	17	7	10	0	.412	1	3	0	.250	0	0	0	—	1 – 1907^{2}	0	—
9	John Griffith	1909	7	2	4	1	.357	0	1	0	.000	0	0	0	—	0	0	—
10	Jesse Hawley	1910–1915	42	24	18	0	.571	8	11	0	.421	0	0	0	—	0	0	—
11	Howard Jones^{†}	1916–1923	60	42	17	1	.708	21	12	0	.636	0	0	0	—	2 – 1921; 1922	0	—
12	Burt Ingwersen	1924–1931	64	33	27	4	.547	11	20	4	.371	0	0	0	—	0	0	—
13	Oscar "Ossie" Solem	1932–1936	40	15	21	4	.425	5	16	4	.280	0	0	0	—	0	0	—
14	Irl Tubbs	1937–1938	16	2	13	1	.156	1	8	1	.150	0	0	0	—	0	0	—
15	Eddie Anderson^{†}	1939–1942, 1946–1949	70	35	33	2	.514	21	24	2	.468	0	0	0	—	0	0	AFCA Coach of the Year (1939)
16	Edward "Slip" Madigan^{†}	1943–1944	16	2	13	1	.156	0	10	1	.045	0	0	0	—	0	0	—
17	Clem Crowe	1945	9	2	7	0	.222	1	5	0	.167	0	0	0	—	0	0	—
18	Leonard Raffensperger	1950–1951	18	5	10	3	.361	2	9	1	.208	0	0	0	—	0	0	—
19	Forest Evashevski^{†}	1952–1960	83	52	27	4	.651	33	21	2	.607	2	0	0	—	3 – 1956; 1958; 1960	1 – 1958	—
20	Jerry Burns	1961–1965	45	16	27	2	.378	8	15	1	.354	0	0	0	—	0	0	—
21	Ray Nagel	1966–1970	49	16	32	1	.337	11	22	2	.343	0	0	0	—	0	0	—
22	Frank Lauterbur	1971–1973	33	4	28	1	.136	3	22	1	.135	0	0	0	—	0	0	—
23	Bob Commings	1974–1978	55	18	37	0	.327	13	27	0	.325	0	0	0	—	0	0	—
24	Hayden Fry^{†}	1979–1998	238	143	89	6	.613	96	61	5	.608	6	7	1	—	3 – 1981; 1985; 1990	0	Sporting News Coach of the Year (1981); Big Ten Coach of the Year (1981); Big Ten Coach of the Year (1990); Big Ten Coach of the Year (1991)
25	Kirk Ferentz	1999–present	341	213	128	—	.625	134	91	—	.596	11	11	—	3 – 2015; 2021; 2023	2 – 2002; 2004	0	AP Coach of the Year (2002); Walter Camp Coach of the Year (2002); Big Ten Coach of the Year (2002); Big Ten Coach of the Year (2004); Big Ten Coach of the Year (2009); Big Ten Coach of the Year (2015)

1. Iowa won the Western Interstate University Football Association (WIUFA) conference championship in 1896.
2. Iowa won the Missouri Valley Intercollegiate Athletic Association (MVIAA) conference championship in 1907.
