= 1892 Nebraska Bugeaters football team =

American college football season

1892 Nebraska Bugeaters football
- Conference: Western Interstate University Football Association
- Record: 2–2–1 (1–1–1 WIUFA)
- Head coach: J. S. Williams (1st season)
- Home stadium: M Street Park; Lincoln Park

1892 Western Interstate University Football Association standings
	Conf.					Overall
Team	W		L		T	W		L		T
Kansas $	3	–	0	–	0	7	–	1	–	0
Nebraska	1	–	1	–	1	2	–	2	–	1
Missouri	1	–	2	–	0	1	–	2	–	0
Iowa	0	–	2	–	1	3	–	2	–	1
$ – Conference champion

The 1892 Nebraska Bugeaters football team represented the University of Nebraska in the 1892 college football season. The team had no head coach, though Omaha lawyer J. S. Williams led the team for one game, and played one home game each at M Street Park and Lincoln Park. They competed as members of the Western Interstate University Football Association.

This was Nebraska's first season as a member of an athletic conference, joining Iowa, Kansas, and Missouri in the newly formed WIUFA.

Nebraska played without a permanent head coach for the third straight season, upsetting many program supporters. The university's newspaper opined "We are thoroughly disgusted with the cheap-John plan of amateur coaches". By the beginning of the 1893 season, Nebraska hired its first paid football coach.

== Schedule ==
Date	Time	Opponent	Site	Result	Attendance	Source
October 24	2:30 p.m.	Illinois*	M Street Park; Lincoln, NE	W 6–0	800	
October 28		at Denver Athletic Club*	Denver, CO	L 4–18		
November 5		vs. Missouri	Omaha, NE (rivalry)	W 1–0 (forfeit)		
November 12	3:00 p.m.	Kansas	Lincoln Park; Lincoln, NE (rivalry)	L 0–12	600	
November 24	3:00 p.m.	vs. Iowa	Omaha, NE (rivalry)	T 10–10	1,000+	
*Non-conference game

== Coaching staff ==
Coach	Position	First year	Alma mater
J. S. Williams	Head coach (unofficial)	1892	
Jack Best	Trainer	1890	Nebraska
Charles Thomas	Assistant coach	1892	Michigan
C. D. Chandler	Manager	1892	

== Roster ==
- Anderson, Arthur C
- Barkley, James QB
- Barnes PLAYER
- Chandler, Charles T
- Church, R.D. E
- Flippin, George HB
- Hopewell, Isaac C
- Howe T
- Hyde, Frederick G
- Johnston, James HB
- Jones, Albin G
- Lord, Harrison T
- Mosher, Bradley FB
- Nusz, Chauncy FB
- Oliver FB
- Pace, Eugene QB
- Porterfield, James T
- Raymond PLAYER
- Sinclair T
- Skiles, Charles E
- Stockton, William T
- White, Jacob FB
- Yont, Alonzo FB
- Yont, Jesse E

== Offensive Starters ==
Offensive starters

LE Alonzo Yont	LT / LG / C / RG / RT; Howe / Jesse Yont / Isaac Hopewell / Albin Jones / Sinclair	RE R.D. Church; Oliver

QB
Eugene Pace

HB	FB	HB
James Johnston	Ebenezer Mockett	George Flippin

== Game summaries ==
=== Illinois ===
Illinois at Nebraska

Team	1	2	Total
Illinois	0	0	0
• Nebraska	6	0	6

- Date: October 24
- Location: M Street Park, Lincoln, NE
- Game attendance: 800

George Flippin, Nebraska's first black player and only the fifth black athlete at a predominantly white college, recovered a late fumble and later scored the game's only points to give the Bugeaters a 6–0 win.

Historical sources disagree on who coached Nebraska in this game. Some suggest J. S. Williams coached this game and quit after, while others show a different coach recorded only as "Mr. Baldwin" was expected to coach against Illinois but ultimately did not, and therefore Williams arrived sometime after this game.

This was the first game in which Nebraska appeared in scarlet and cream, which would later become the university's official colors.

=== At Denver Athletic Club ===
Nebraska at Denver AC

Team	1	2	Total
Nebraska			4
• Denver AC			18

- Date: October 29
- Location: Denver, CO

Although Nebraska faced an out-of-state team for the first time in 1891, this was NU's first game played outside the state of Nebraska. The Bugeaters were badly outmatched by the professional-grade Denver Athletic Club, managing only a late touchdown to avoid a shutout loss.

=== Missouri ===
Missouri vs. Nebraska

Team	1	2	Total
Missouri			0
• Nebraska			1

- Date: November 5
- Location: Omaha, NE

This was set to be Nebraska's first-ever conference game, but the University of Missouri squad refused to play due to the presence of African American George Flippin on NU's roster. The game was ruled a forfeit and the score officially recorded as 1–0. Afterward, the WIUFA established a rule preventing member teams from refusing to play scheduled matches.

Official University of Missouri records list the score of this game as a 6–0 forfeit Nebraska victory.

=== Kansas ===
Kansas at Nebraska

Team	1	2	Total
• Kansas			12
Nebraska			0

- Date: November 12
- Location: Lincoln Park, Lincoln, NE
- Game attendance: 600

Despite being only the second conference game for both teams, the WIUFA's brief conference slate made this the de facto conference championship game. The Bugeaters escaped early Jayhawks scoring opportunities, but were unable to do anything on offense as Kansas eventually wore Nebraska down to claim the first WIUFA football title.

This was the first of what would become the longest continuous annual series between any two college football teams, as Kansas and Nebraska would meet every year from 1891 through 2010. The annual series ended in 2011 when Nebraska joined the Big Ten Conference.

=== Iowa ===
Iowa vs. Nebraska

Team	1	2	Total
Iowa	10	0	10
Nebraska	4	6	10

- Date: November 24
- Location: Omaha, NE
- Game attendance: 1,000+
- Game weather: Cold sleet

Halfback George Flippin opened the game with a 40-yard run around the right end, which was followed by a Bugeater touchdown. Iowa responded with two touchdowns before halftime to pull ahead 10–4. Flippin scored to open the second half, and a successful extra kick tied the game at 10, when it was called on account of darkness, becoming the first tie in Nebraska history.
