= A. W. Shepard =

American football player and coach (1865–1951)

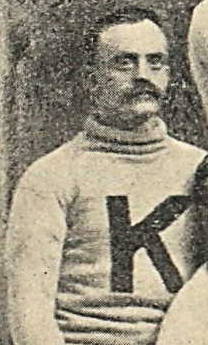
- Shepard in 1892 as head football coach at the University of Kansas

Biographical details
- Born: August 21, 1865; North Evans, New York, U.S.
- Died: January 13, 1951 (aged 85); St. Petersburg, Florida, U.S.

Playing career
- 1889–1891: Cornell
- 1892–1893: Kansas
- Position: Right end

Coaching career (HC unless noted)
- 1892–1893: Kansas

Head coaching record
- Overall: 9–6

Accomplishments and honors

Championships
- 2 WIUFA (1892–1893)

Alvin Wayland Shepard (August 21, 1865 – January 13, 1951) was an American football coach and player, and later a school principal. He served as the head coach at the University of Kansas from 1892 to 1893, compiling a record of 9–6. Shepard played college football at Cornell University from 1889 through 1891. He graduated from Cornell in 1891 with a Bachelor of Science degree and left for the University of Kansas the following year to do postgraduate work. While at Kansas he was a player-coach in that he not only coached the team for two years, but he also played on the team as a right end. After his two-year stint as the head coach and a player at Kansas, Shepard received his M.S. in physics from the University of Kansas in 1893, and he returned to his native New York, where he married his wife, Josephine Rebecca Frost, on August 3, 1896. He was a school principal for many years in Buffalo, New York. Shepard died on January 13, 1951, at a hospital in St. Petersburg, Florida. He was survived by a son, Alvin Frost Shepard (February 3, 1904 – October, 1978), and two daughters, Rebecca Shepard (September 1, 1906 – May 2, 1989) and Margaret Shepard (September 18, 1910 – January 13, 2006).

== Head coaching record ==
Shepard in his 1889 Cornell football team photo

Year	Team	Overall	Conference	Standing	Bowl/playoffs
Kansas Jayhawks (Western Interstate University Football Association) (1892–1893)
1892	Kansas	7–1	3–0	1st	
1893	Kansas	2–5	2–1	T–1st	
Kansas:		9–6	5–1		
Total:		9–6			
