= Frank Crawford =

American football player and lawyer (1870–1963)

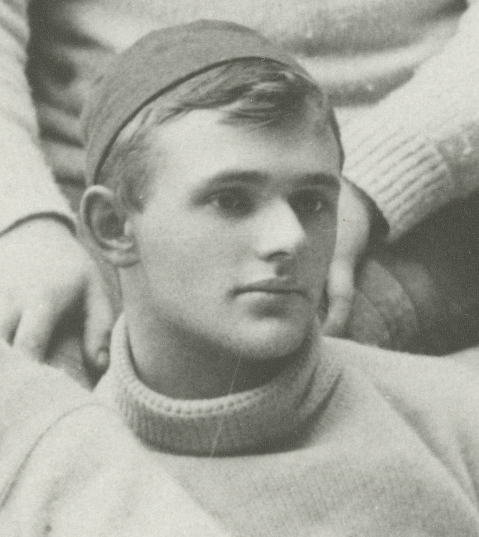
- Crawford on the 1891 Michigan Wolverines football team

Biographical details
- Born: March 12, 1870; Colebrook, New Hampshire, U.S.
- Died: November 25, 1963 (aged 93); Portland, Maine, U.S.
- Education: Yale University (1891)

Playing career

Football
- 1891: Michigan
- 1892: Baker
- 1893: Nebraska

Baseball
- 1892–1893: Michigan
- Positions: End, halfback, quarterback (football); Catcher, left fielder (baseball)

Coaching career (HC unless noted)

Football
- 1891: Michigan
- 1892: Baker
- 1893–1894: Nebraska
- 1895: Texas
- 1896: Nebraska Wesleyan

Head coaching record
- Overall: 23–14–1

Accomplishments and honors

Championships
- 1 WIUFA (1894)

Francis Bemis Crawford Jr. (March 12, 1870 – November 25, 1963) was an American college football player and coach, lawyer, and law professor. He served as the first full-time head football coach at both Michigan and Nebraska, and also coached at Baker and Texas for single seasons. Crawford attended Yale University and served as a lawyer in Nebraska and France following his retirement from football. He was a law professor at Creighton College of Law from 1906 to 1913.

== Early years ==
Crawford was born in 1870 at Colebrook, New Hampshire. He was the son of Francis B. Crawford, a starch manufacturer and state legislator, and Susan J. (Randall) Crawford. He attended preparatory school at St. Johnsbury Academy in St. Johnsbury, Vermont. He enrolled at Yale University, receiving his Bachelor of Arts degree in 1891. Sources are at odds over whether or not Crawford played football for the Yale Bulldogs football team. According to the University of Nebraska web site, Crawford was "a member of the dominant Yale teams of the mid-1880s." The Michigan Daily also reported that Crawford played football at Yale "for several years." However, the University of Michigan web site notes that "Yale archivists found no evidence that he played varsity football" and concludes that Crawford "may have played some football while a Bulldog, but definitely did not win a varsity letter."

== Coaching career ==
=== Michigan ===
After graduating from Yale, Crawford enrolled at the University of Michigan School of Law, receiving his law degree in 1893. As a first-year law student, Crawford was both the unpaid coach and a substitute player for the 1891 Michigan Wolverines football team. He helped lead the team to a 4–5 record. He has been identified by several sources as the first football coach in program history. Other sources indicate that Crawford and Mike Murphy were the joint head coaches of the 1891 Michigan football team. Others state that Murphy relinquished the coaching duties to Crawford midway through the season to allow him to focus on his duties as trainer. The Chicago Daily Tribune reported in November 1891 that the Michigan team was "coached systematically" by Murphy, Crawford, Horace Greely Prettyman and James Duffy.

While attending Michigan, Crawford also played for the Michigan Wolverines baseball team in 1892 and 1893. He led the team with a .976 fielding average in 1892. Crawford appeared in 17 games at catcher and left fielder for the Wolverines in 1892 and was among the team's leaders in runs (tied for second with 20), stolen bases (tied for second with 13) and putouts (second with 115). He was also selected as the captain of the 1893 baseball team.

In his history of the University of Michigan, Wilfred Byron Shaw cites Crawford's hiring as a watershed moment in the history of the school's football program: "A new era in the history of football at Michigan began in 1891, when with a fair schedule and an experienced coach, [Crawford], the systematic development of a team began". Although football had been played at Michigan without a coaching staff since 1879, the Associated Press noted at the time of Crawford's death that he "is credited with introducing football at the University of Michigan in 1891."

=== Baker ===
In November 1892, Crawford served as "a paid coach-captain player" for the football team at Baker University at Baldwin, Kansas. He reportedly "brought many innovations," including the training table, to Baker's football program. He played at right halfback and quarterback, leading Baker to the Kansas state championship and a 2–1 record in "the triangular league," including victories over Washburn (44–0) and Kansas (18–0). Baker had an overall record of 2–3 on the season. In December 1892, the Leavenworth Times reported that Crawford had "succeeded in instilling sufficient foot ball lore into the western farmers to accomplish the defeat of the University of Kansas team by the Baker eleven last week." In May 1893, The Baker Beacon reported: "The Baker team was ably coached and captained by Frank Crawford who had learned the game at Yale and by the close of the season the team ... was in excellent condition."

=== Nebraska ===
In 1893, Crawford was hired as the head football coach at the University of Nebraska. He was the school's first paid head football coach with a salary of approximately $500. He was Nebraska's head football coach during the 1893 and 1894 seasons and compiled a 9–4–1 record. After starting the 1893 season with a 2–2–1 record, Crawford's team defeated Iowa, 20–18, in a match played in near-blizzard conditions and considered the "first major victory" in Nebraska history. Crawford reportedly also played right halfback and kicked the field goals for Nebraska during the 1893 Iowa game; he was identified in the record book as "Frank." In 1894, Crawford's team defeated Iowa, 36–0. The 1895 team finished the season with five consecutive victories for a 7–2 record and the school's first ever conference championship. During Crawford's tenure at Nebraska, George Flippin played for Crawford and became the first African-American athlete in Nebraska history. However, in 1893, Flippin was voted team captain by the team, but this decision was vetoed by Crawford, stating: "It takes a man with brains to be a captain; all there is to Flippin is brute force." Flippin went on to be a well-respected physician in Polk County, Nebraska and the first African-American inducted into the Nebraska Football Hall of Fame.

=== Texas ===
In 1894, the University of Texas football team suffered its first loss in school history, a 28–0 home loss to Missouri. The previous head coach was fired, and a lengthy search was conducted for a replacement. In October 1895, Texas hired Crawford. At Texas, he was known as "Little" Crawford and reportedly "taught the Yale system of play and stressed conditioning." Crawford led the 1895 Longhorns to a perfect 5–0 record, as the team outscored its opponents by a combined 96–0 margin After a Thanksgiving Day victory over San Antonio by a score of 38–0, Crawford reportedly left for Mexico to watch bullfights and then returned to his home in Nebraska.

=== Nebraska Wesleyan ===
Crawford coached the football team at Nebraska Wesleyan University in 1896. The team compiled a record of 3–2.

== Legal and teaching career ==
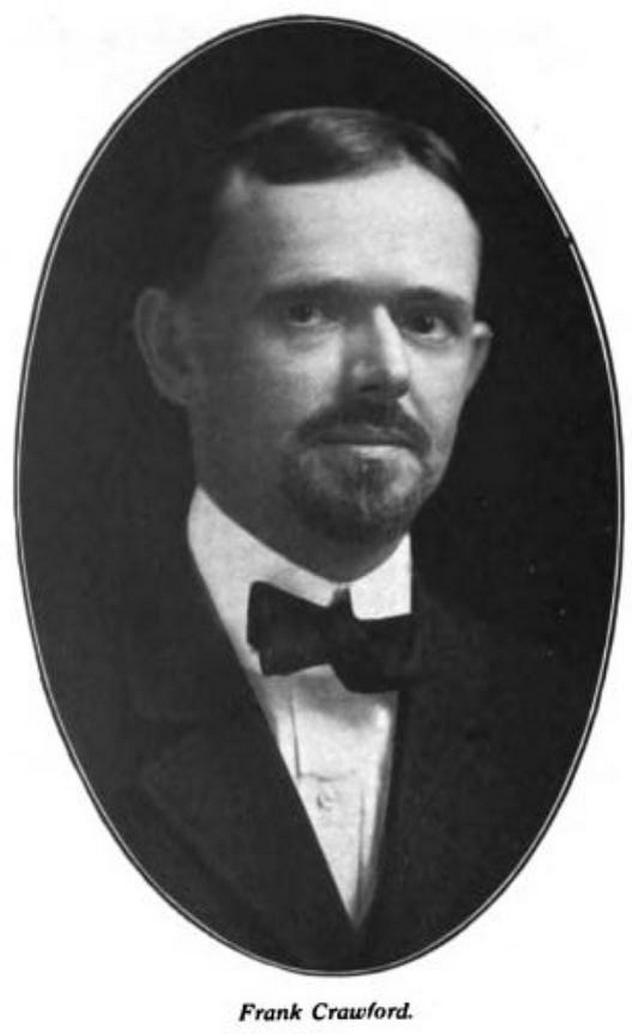
Crawford as law professor at Creighton, 1909.

In 1893, Crawford opened a law practice with Albert Jefferis in Omaha, Nebraska. Jefferis was a classmate and teammate with Crawford on the baseball and football teams at the University of Michigan and later served in the United States House of Representatives. In 1901, Crawford formed a law partnership in Omaha under the name Crawford & Clarke with Henry Teft Clarke Jr., a former Major League Baseball pitcher.

Crawford joined the faculty of Creighton University School of Law in 1906 where he remained until 1913. He taught classes in evidence and public service companies.

From the end of World War I until the outbreak of World War II, Crawford practiced law in France, first in Paris and later in Nice.

== Family and death ==
Crawford was married to Hannah Louise McNair, a descendant of four colonial governors. Crawford and his wife moved to France in the mid-1920s and to New York City in the early 1940s. His wife died in September 1943 at the French Hospital in New York City. Crawford later lived in Winchester, Massachusetts, and in the 1950s moved to Freeport, Maine to reside in the home of his cousin, Helen Randall. He died at age 93, on November 25, 1963, at a hospital in Portland, Maine.

== Head coaching record ==
Year	Team	Overall	Conference	Standing	Bowl/playoffs
Michigan Wolverines (Independent) (1891)
1891	Michigan	4–5			
Michigan:		4–5			
Baker Methodists (Independent) (1892)
1892	Baker	2–3			
Baker:		2–3			
Nebraska Bugeaters (Western Interstate University Football Association) (1893–1894)
1893	Nebraska	3–2–1	1–2	3rd	
1894	Nebraska	6–2	2–1	1st	
Nebraska:		9–4–1	3–3		
Texas Longhorns (Independent) (1895)
1895	Texas	5–0			
Texas:		5–0			
Nebraska Wesleyan (Independent) (1896)
1896	Nebraska Wesleyan	3–2			
Nebraska Wesleyan:		3–2			
Total:		23–14–1			
National championship Conference title Conference division title or championship game berth

(Note: National Collegiate Athletic Association (NCAA) and Wisconsin Badgers football records indicate that Crawford was Wisconsin's coach in 1892, but contemporary coverage shows that Billy Crawford coached Wisconsin in 1892, while Frank coached at Baker University.)
