= George Flippin =

American football player and doctor (1868–1929)

Profile
- Position: Halfback

Personal information
- Born: February 8, 1868; Port Isabelle or Point Isabel, Ohio
- Died: May 15, 1929 (aged 61); Stromsburg, Nebraska
- Listed height: 5 ft 11 in (1.80 m)

Career information
- College: Nebraska

George Albert Flippin (February 8, 1868 – May 15, 1929) was an American football left halfback and a medical doctor in Nebraska. He was the first star player of the Nebraska Cornhuskers football team, the first Black player on the team, and among the first Black college football players nationwide. He was inducted into the Nebraska Football Hall of Fame in 1974.

== Young life ==
Flippin's father, Charles, was a freed slave who fought in the Civil War on the Union side in the 14th United States Colored Infantry Regiment, then became a doctor. Charles and Mahala Flippin had their son George in Ohio in 1868, three years after the end of the Civil War. When George's mother Mahala died in 1871, his father and brother moved away, first to Kansas, then to Henderson, Nebraska in 1888.

== Football career ==
George Flippin attended the University of Nebraska in Lincoln from 1891 to 1894.

Football was a young sport, and a University of Nebraska football team had only existed for a few months when Flippin arrived on campus. Flippin's first game, against the Iowa Hawkeyes inn 1891, was the fifth game in the university's history. He proved talented, and quickly become the star of the new team.

Because of Flippin's presence on the Nebraska team, the Missouri team refused to play a scheduled football game on November 5, 1892, forfeiting what would have been the first meeting between the two teams. Nebraska's student newspaper mocked the segregated Missouri team, saying that Missouri's anti-black bigotry would cause them to lose the football game just as they lost the American Civil War. The paper claimed racial inclusion as a part of Nebraska's identity.

Flippin experienced racism. He was denied entrance to an opera house after a game in Denver, and he sued a bathhouse in Lincoln for refusing to admit him because of his race. A restaurant in Omaha relegated the football team to a private dining room rather than allow Flippin to be seen in the public area.

His teammates elected him team captain after the 1894 season. Nebraska's football coach, Frank Crawford, would not allow a Black man to be team captain.

Flippin left Nebraska to study medicine at the College of Physicians and Surgeons in Chicago from 1898, graduating in 1900. He paid for his education by playing football for the school at $75 per season. This makes him among the earliest people to be paid to play football.

Flippin was inducted into the Nebraska Football Hall of Fame in 1974.

== Later life ==
After earning a medical degree in Chicago, he served as a doctor in Stromsburg, Nebraska until his death in 1929. He established the community's first hospital. In 1910 he married Stromsburg schoolteacher Mertina Larson; because interracial marriage was unlawful in Nebraska, Flippin and the white Larson were married in Iowa. He is the only Black person buried in the Stromsburg cemetery.
