= Cooper Park (Lincoln, Nebraska) =

Urban park in Lincoln, Nebraska

- Interactive map of Cooper Park
- Type: Urban park
- Location: 6th and D Streets; Lincoln, Nebraska, U. S.
- Coordinates: 40.8035°N 96.7115°W
- Area: 11.52 acres (4.66 ha)
- Created: 1900
- Owner: City of Lincoln
- Operator: Lincoln Parks and Recreation

Cooper Park (formerly Lincoln Park, City Park, and F Street Park) is an urban park and former American football field on 6th and D Streets in Lincoln, Nebraska. It is the oldest park in Lincoln and served as the first home venue of the Nebraska Cornhuskers football team in 1891 and 1892.

== History ==
As early as 1865, efforts were made to establish a park on an 11.52-acre (4.66 ha) field between D and F Streets in Lincoln. During early work preparing the land, several shallow graves of pioneers were unearthed by construction workers and relocated to nearby cemeteries. An inability to grow trees on the land and a lack of water delayed the project for decades; the site was frequently used by grazing cattle. Eventually, green spaces and buildings were created, and a park was officially established in 1900 under the direction of famed landscape architect Jens Jensen. Presidential candidate William Jennings Bryan attended Lincoln Park's grand opening on July 12, 1900.

The park was redeveloped throughout the 1950s using a $32,000 donation from The Cooper Foundation, and dedicated in founder Joseph Cooper's honor in 1954. The project eliminated some of Jensen's original design, but added a picnic shelter, ice skating rink, and other amenities.

By the 2000s, Cooper Park was outdated and rundown, and frequently the site of petty crime. The City of Lincoln developed a master plan to revitalize the park in conjunction with the 150th anniversary of the first construction on the site.

=== Football ===
The University of Nebraska's football history unofficially began in 1889 with the creation of an on-campus field. The field had no permanent seating, forcing the university to use local parks to host games throughout the 1890s. Nebraska played its first home game on October 31, 1891, defeating Doane 28–4 at Lincoln Park (though it had not yet been officially established). The park was two miles south of the team's on-campus practice field and hosted another game in 1892, a 12–0 loss to Kansas. Nebraska primarily hosted games at M Street Park, located closer to campus, from 1893 until constructing its first stadium in 1897.

== Modern layout ==
The park includes a ballfield, basketball court, playground, pond, tennis court, and two pickleball courts. It is bordered on the north by Park Middle School, on the south by D Street, and on the east and west by 6th and 8th Streets. In 2021, a portion of the park was eliminated to make room for a driveway leading to the school.
