= E. H. Jones (coach) =

American football coach

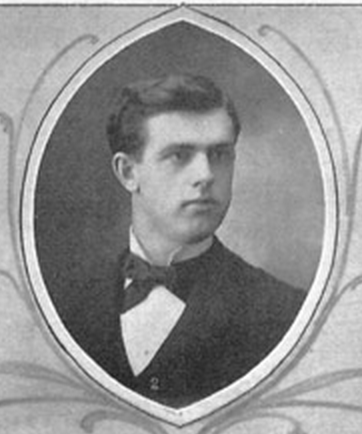
- Jones pictured in The Savitar 1898, Missouri yearbook

Coaching career (HC unless noted)
- 1892: Missouri

Head coaching record
- Overall: 1–2

E. H. "Sallie" Jones was an American college football coach. He was the third head football coach at the University of Missouri in Columbia, Missouri, serving for one season, in 1892, and compiling a record of 1–2.

== Head coaching record ==
Year	Team	Overall	Conference	Standing	Bowl/playoffs
Missouri Tigers (Western Interstate University Football Association) (1892)
1892	Missouri	1–2	1–2	3rd	
Missouri:		1–2	1–2		
Total:		1–2			
