= 1892 Iowa Hawkeyes football team =

American college football season

1892 Iowa Hawkeyes football
- Conference: Western Interstate University Football Association
- Record: 3–2–1 (0–2–1 WIUFA)
- Head coach: Edwin A. Dalton (1st season)
- Home stadium: Iowa Field

1892 Western Interstate University Football Association standings
	Conf.					Overall
Team	W		L		T	W		L		T
Kansas $	3	–	0	–	0	7	–	1	–	0
Nebraska	1	–	1	–	1	2	–	2	–	1
Missouri	1	–	2	–	0	1	–	2	–	0
Iowa	0	–	2	–	1	3	–	2	–	1
$ – Conference champion

The 1892 Iowa Hawkeyes football team represented the State University of Iowa ("S.U.I."), now commonly known as the University of Iowa, during the 1892 college football season. The season involved many 'firsts' for the Hawkeyes. After going three years without a conference, Iowa joined the Western Interstate University Football Association, along with Nebraska, Missouri, and Kansas. But in another first, Edwin A. Dalton, formerly of Princeton University, was hired as Iowa's head coach. Although he was only hired for 10 days prior to the season, he is recognized as Iowa's first head coach.

On the field, the results were relatively modest. After opening the season with two victories, the Hawkeyes found themselves no match for Kansas and Missouri. Criticism was voiced, with the Iowa City Citizen claiming that Iowa lost the Missouri game because of favoritism. Despite this, Iowa ended Iowa College's three-year span of dominance over the Hawkeyes by defeating the Pioneers 18–12 just four days after the loss at Missouri. Soon thereafter, the Hawkeyes ended the season with a 10–10 tie against Nebraska.

== Schedule ==
Date	Time	Opponent	Site	Result	Attendance	Source
October 21		at Coe*	Cedar Rapids, IA	W 48–0		
October 29		Knox (IL)*	Iowa Field; Iowa City, IA	W 44–0		
November 5	3:00 p.m.	vs. Kansas	Exposition Park; Kansas City, MO	L 4–26	2,500	
November 12		at Missouri	Rollins Field; Columbia, MO	L 0–22		
November 16		Iowa College*	Iowa Field; Iowa City, IA	W 18–12		
November 24		vs. Nebraska	Omaha, NE (rivalry)	T 10–10		
*Non-conference game
