= Antelope Field =

Former American football stadium in Lincoln, Nebraska

Coordinates: 40.8183°N 96.7062°W

- Interactive map of Antelope Field
- Location: N. 10th Street and R Street; Lincoln, Nebraska
- Owner: University of Nebraska
- Operator: University of Nebraska
- Capacity: Approx. 6,000
- Surface: Natural grass

Construction
- Opened: 1897; 129 years ago
- Demolished: 1907

Tenants
- Nebraska Cornhuskers (NCAA); Baseball (1897–1907); Football (1897–1907); Track and field (1897–1907)

Antelope Field was a multi-sport stadium on the campus of the University of Nebraska in Lincoln, Nebraska. It was the home venue for the Nebraska Cornhuskers football, baseball, and track and field teams from 1897 until it was demolished to make room for academic facilities in 1907. Following its closure, Nebraska played the 1908 football season at M Street Park before moving to Nebraska Field in 1909.

The contemporary name of the venue is unclear. It is now typically called Antelope Field but while in use it was most often referred to as simply the "athletic field," "campus field," or "Nebraska Field" (the name that would be officially applied to its successor).

== History ==
Nebraska's football history unofficially began in 1889 when a group of civil engineering students chopped down enough trees to create a small field at the corner of 10th and R Streets in Lincoln on the western edge of campus, several hundred yards south of where Memorial Stadium sits today. Though adequate for practice, the field had no permanent seating and was not used as a home venue until wooden grandstands were erected in 1897. It was the first permanent athletic venue at the university, which previously used nearby parks or traveled to Omaha to host football games. Over the following decade, the bleachers were expanded until capacity reached "several thousand" spectators, with some reported attendances around 6,000 (though many would have been standing). To prevent brawling, the university added a barbed wire enclosure around the playing surface, and eventually constructed a wooden fence to keep non-paying spectators from seeing the field.

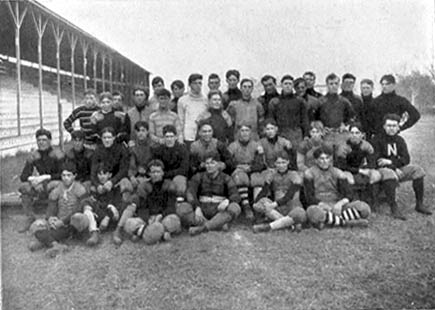
The 1903 Nebraska Cornhuskers football team at Antelope Field

Nebraska hosted Minnesota at Antelope Field in 1900, the first meeting between the schools. The heavily favored Gophers won 20–12, but Nebraska and new head coach Walter C. Booth gained national respect for their effort. NU fell to Minnesota again the following year, but soon began a twenty-four game win streak that included sixteen victories at Antelope Field.

In 1904, the university began planning a physics laboratory on the site of Antelope Field, bringing the future of the venue and entire football program into question. Strong resistance from the Athletic Board and student body were successful in creating a compromise – Brace Laboratory was constructed on the southern portion of the athletic field while the venue was shifted north, with the south grandstands removed and reconstructed on the opposite sideline. However, space limitations meant the field had to be shortened from its then-standard 110 yards and allowed just a few feet of clearance beyond the goal line on either end (early college football fields did not have end zones). Just before construction began, the laboratory was moved five feet further from the goal line so defenders could not brace themselves against the wall to stop an offensive effort.

Though the football team did not lose at Antelope Field for three seasons after its reconfiguration, injuries and "ill luck" were attributed to the field's poor conditions. Players complained the playing surface was "either as hard as pavement or a sea of mud."

The university struggled with academic and athletic overcrowding throughout the late nineteenth and early twentieth century, and in 1908 the Board of Regents approved the construction of a mechanical engineering laboratory (what is now Richards Hall) on the remainder of Antelope Field. This time regents were unreceptive to public pushback, leaving the football program without a facility of any kind – head coach William C. Cole lamented that his team had to practice in cow pastures. Nebraska departed Antelope Field with an 85–0 victory over Doane, and an all-time record of 56–5–1 at the venue.

Nebraska considered playing its entire 1908 season away from Lincoln, but eventually settled on hosting games at M Street Park, the same venue it used before Antelope Field. The following year, a tract of land north of Antelope Field was purchased and the program moved to Nebraska Field on the corner of North 10th and T Streets.
