= 1892 Kansas Jayhawks football team =

American college football season

1892 Kansas Jayhawks football

WIUFA champion
- Conference: Western Interstate University Football Association
- Record: 7–1 (3–0 WIUFA)
- Head coach: A. W. Shepard (1st season)
- Captain: John Kenzie
- Home stadium: McCook Field

1892 Western Interstate University Football Association standings
| | Conf. | | | | | Overall |
| Team | W | | L | | T | W | | L | | T |
|---|---|---|---|---|---|---|---|---|---|---|
| Kansas $ | 3 | – | 0 | – | 0 | 7 | – | 1 | – | 0 |
| Nebraska | 1 | – | 1 | – | 1 | 2 | – | 2 | – | 1 |
| Missouri | 1 | – | 2 | – | 0 | 1 | – | 2 | – | 0 |
| Iowa | 0 | – | 2 | – | 1 | 3 | – | 2 | – | 1 |
$ – Conference champion

The 1892 Kansas Jayhawks football team represented the University of Kansas in the Western Interstate University Football Association (WIUFA) during the 1892 college football season. In their first season under head coach A. W. Shepard, the Jayhawks compiled a 7–1 record (3–0 against conference opponents), won the conference championship, and outscored opponents by a combined total of 144 to 36. The Jayhawks played home games at McCook Field in Lawrence, Kansas. John Kenzie was the team captain.

== Schedule ==
| Date | Time | Opponent | Site | Result | Attendance | Source |
|---|---|---|---|---|---|---|
| October 15 | 4:15 p.m. | at Denver Athletic Club* | Denver, CO | W 20–6 | 3,000 | |
| October 21 | 2:15 p.m. | Baker* | Lawrence, KS | W 14–0 | 600 | |
| October 27 | 2:50 p.m. | Illinois* | McCook Field; Lawrence, KS | W 26–4 | 1,000 | |
| October 29 | 3:50 p.m. | Washburn* | McCook Field; Lawrence, KS | W 36–0 | 200 | |
| November 5 | 3:00 p.m. | vs. Iowa | Exposition Park; Kansas City, MO | W 26–4 | 2,500 | |
| November 12 | 3:00 p.m. | at Nebraska | Lincoln Park; Lincoln, NE (rivalry) | W 12–0 | 600 | |
| November 19 | | at Baker* | Baldwin City, KS | L 0–18 | | |
| November 24 | 3:00 p.m. | vs. Missouri | Exposition Park; Kansas City, MO (rivalry) | W 12–4 | 3,500 | |
*Non-conference game
