= Edwin A. Dalton =

American football player, coach, and banker (1869–1947)

Biographical details
- Born: October 3, 1869; Jesup, Iowa, U.S.
- Died: November 30, 1947 (aged 78); Le Mars, Iowa, U.S.

Playing career
- 1890: Princeton
- Positions: Halfback, end

Coaching career (HC unless noted)
- 1892: Iowa

Head coaching record
- Overall: 3–2–1

Edwin A. Dalton (October 3, 1869 – November 30, 1947) was an American college football player, coach, and banker. He was the first paid football coach for the Iowa Hawkeyes football team, holding the post for ten days in October 1892. He served as the president of the First National Bank in Le Mars, Iowa for many years until his retirement in 1932.

== Early years ==
Dalton was born at Jesup, Iowa in 1869 and moved with his family to Le Mars, Iowa in 1873. After graduating from Le Mars High School, Dalton enrolled at Princeton University. He played college football at the end and halfback positions on the Princeton Tigers football team in 1890.

== Banking career ==
After graduating from Princeton, Dalton returned to Iowa and became employed by the First National Bank in LeMars that had been founded by his father, Patrick F. Dalton (1838-1922), in 1882. He served for many years as the bank's president before retiring in 1932.

== Football coach ==
In October 1892, he served briefly as the head football coach at the University of Iowa. He was the first paid football coach for the Iowa Hawkeyes football team. He coached the team in 1892, a year in which the team compiled a record of 3–2–1. According to the Iowa Alumnus magazine, Dalton's tenure as Iowa's head football coach lasted for ten days during October 1892.

== Personal life ==
Dalton was married in 1898 to Julia McLean. They had a son, Donald Dalton, who was a captain in the United States Navy. At the time of the 1900 and 1920 United States Census, as well as the 1925 Iowa State Census, Dalton was living in Le Mars with his wife, Julia. Dalton was a member of the Prairie Club and a charter member of the Le Mars Chamber of Commerce.

The house built in 1900 by Edwin and Julia Dalton at 25 Sixth Street N.E. is considered one of Le Mars' historic properties and has been included in historic house tours sponsored by the Le Mars Historic Preservation Commission and the Plymouth County Historical Museum.

== Head coaching record ==
Year	Team	Overall	Conference	Standing	Bowl/playoffs
Iowa Hawkeyes (Western Interstate University Football Association) (1892)
1892	Iowa	3–2–1	0–2–1	4th	
Iowa:		3–2–1	0–2–1		
Total:		3–2–1			
