= 1892 Missouri Tigers football team =

American college football season

1892 Missouri Tigers football
- Conference: Western Interstate University Football Association
- Record: 1–2 (1–2 WIUFA)
- Head coach: E. H. Jones (1st season)
- Captain: D. Lee Shawhan

1892 Western Interstate University Football Association standings
	Conf.					Overall
Team	W		L		T	W		L		T
Kansas $	3	–	0	–	0	7	–	1	–	0
Nebraska	1	–	1	–	1	2	–	2	–	1
Missouri	1	–	2	–	0	1	–	2	–	0
Iowa	0	–	2	–	1	3	–	2	–	1
$ – Conference champion

The 1892 Missouri Tigers football team was an American football team that represented the University of Missouri as a member of the Western Interstate University Football Association (WIUFA) during the 1891 college football season. In its first season under head coach E. H. Jones, the team compiled a 1–2 record.

== Schedule ==
Date	Time	Opponent	Site	Result	Attendance	Source
November 5		vs. Nebraska	Omaha, NE (rivalry)	L 0–6 (forfeit)		
November 12		at Iowa	Columbia, MO	W 24–4		
November 24	3:00 p.m.	vs. Kansas	Exposition Park; Kansas City, MO (rivalry)	L 4–12	3,500	
