= M Street Park =

Former American football stadium in Lincoln, Nebraska

Coordinates: 40.8104°N 96.6882°W

- Interactive map of M Street Park
- Former names: M Street Park (1892–1896); Antelope Park (1908–1909)
- Location: N. 23rd Street and M Street; Lincoln, Nebraska
- Operator: City of Lincoln
- Capacity: Approx. 4,000
- Surface: Natural grass
- Record attendance: Est. 4,000–5,000

Construction
- Opened: October 24, 1892; 134 years ago

Tenants
- Nebraska Cornhuskers football (1892–1896, 1908–1909)

M Street Park (later Antelope Park) was an American football field in Lincoln, Nebraska on 23rd and M Streets, just southeast of the University of Nebraska's main campus. It served as the primary home venue of the Nebraska Cornhuskers football team from 1892 through 1896, and again from 1908 until partway through the 1909 season.

== History ==
Nebraska's football history unofficially began in 1889 when a group of students chopped down enough trees to create a small field on the western edge of campus. Though adequate for practice, the field had no permanent seating, forcing the university to use Lincoln Park to host its first home game in 1891; Nebraska also played several "home" games in Omaha throughout the 1890s.

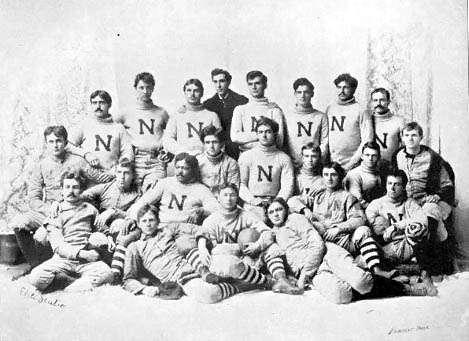
The 1894 Nebraska football team played both of its home games at M Street Park

Nebraska hosted its first game at M Street Park on October 24, 1892, a 6–0 victory over Illinois attended by approximately 800 people in bleachers on the field's north and south ends (Lincoln Park was used to host the only other 1892 game in Lincoln). During a game the following year, a 10–10 tie against Baker ended with police intervening to prevent students from rushing the field and assaulting a Baker player who served as the game's umpire.

In 1897, wooden grandstands were erected at the original campus field, which became known as Antelope Field. It was demolished to make room for academic facilities in 1907, and Nebraska considered playing its entire 1908 season away from Lincoln before settling on a return to M Street Park (by then known as Antelope Park). Antelope Park was ill-prepared to host football in 1908, with bleachers that had to be enlarged and moved partway through the season to ensure fans could see the field. On multiple occasions games were played with standing water across the playing surface. Head coach William C. Cole lamented that his team had to practice in cow pastures due to the lack of a suitable venue.

Despite the conditions at Antelope Park, Cole and the Cornhuskers were in position to defend their MVIAA title when they hosted Kansas in November. Hundreds of Jayhawks supporters were part of a crowd of 4,000 that saw KU upset Nebraska. Three weeks later, Nebraska added a postseason game against Carlisle and star Jim Thorpe at Antelope Park; the Indians dominated the second half after a slow start on a frigid December day.

Nebraska played its first two home games of 1909 at Antelope Park before opening Nebraska Field on the corner of North 10th and T Streets. The program departed M Street Park with an all-time record of 9–5–2, but continued to use the field for practice until at least 1918. The site is now home to the Lewis Ballfield Complex, a youth baseball and softball facility (approximately one mile northwest of Lincoln's present-day Antelope Park, which is unrelated to the former football venue).
