= 1891 Stanford football team =

American college football season

1891 Stanford football
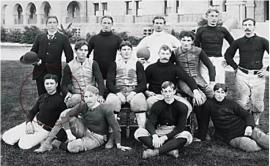
- Conference: Independent
- Record: 3–1
- Head coach: None
- Captain: John Whittemore

1891 Midwestern college football independents records
	Conf.			Overall
Team	W	L	T	W		L		T
Ohio Wesleyan		–		4	–	0	–	0
Kansas		–		7	–	0	–	1
Illinois		–		5	–	1	–	0
Missouri		–		3	–	1	–	0
Lake Forest		–		6	–	2	–	0
Washington University		–		4	–	1	–	1
Minnesota		–		3	–	1	–	1
Wisconsin		–		3	–	1	–	1
Cincinnati		–		4	–	2	–	1
Iowa		–		3	–	2	–	0
Doane		–		2	–	2	–	0
Iowa College		–		1	–	1	–	1
Miami (OH)		–		1	–	1	–	0
Nebraska		–		2	–	2	–	0
Northwestern		–		2	–	2	–	3
Michigan		–		4	–	5	–	0
Ohio State		–		2	–	3	–	0
Case		–		1	–	2	–	0
Buchtel		–		1	–	3	–	0
Washburn		–		1	–	5	–	0
Michigan State Normal		–		0	–	2	–	0

The 1891 Stanford football team represented Stanford University in the 1891 college football season. This was the inaugural year of both the University and the football team: the University opened in October 1891 and the four-game season was played in early 1892.

== Origins ==
Soon after Stanford opened on October 1, 1891, students set out to form a football team. One transfer student, John Whittemore, had played football at Washington University. He was chosen as captain and began to organize the team.

Whittemore acted as de facto coach, drawing up plays and organizing practices. The team won its first two games against Hopkins Academy and Berkeley Gym before losing to a team from San Francisco's Olympic Club. In its final game of the first season, Stanford upset a more experienced team from the University of California, Berkeley, setting the stage for what would become the longstanding Big Game rivalry.

== Schedule ==
Date	Opponent	Site	Result
January 30, 1892	vs. Hopkins Academy	Redwood City, CA	W 10–6
February 6, 1892	vs. Berkeley Gym	Berkeley, CA	W 22–0
February 13, 1892	Olympic Club	Stanford, CA	L 6–10
March 19, 1892	California	Haight Street Grounds; San Francisco, CA (rivalry)	W 14–10

== Game summaries ==
=== California ===
1st Big Game

Team	1	2	Total
California	0	10	10
• Stanford	14	0	14

- Date: March 19
- Location: Haight Street Grounds, San Francisco, CA
- Game attendance: 15,000

Soon after formation of Stanford's team, players at the University of California, Berkeley, which had been playing football for 10 years, contacted the team to set up a Thanksgiving Day game; as the Stanford team was still organizing, a spring game was eventually agreed to.

On March 19, 1892, the Stanford and California teams met to play at Haight Street Grounds in San Francisco. Stanford's team manager was future U.S. President Herbert Hoover; Hoover had printed 10,000 tickets for the game, but soon an overflow crowd forced Hoover to collect cash payment for admission. As the game was about to begin, both teams realized that no one had brought a ball. An owner of a sporting goods store who was in attendance was dispatched on horseback to retrieve a ball and the game eventually started an hour late.

Stanford employed some trick plays and scored the first three touchdowns of the game (touchdowns were worth 4 points at that time), making only one of their goal kicks (then worth 2 points). Having scored all their points in the first half, Stanford held on to upset the more experienced California team 14–10, who scored their points by two touchdowns and one safety (worth 2 points), missing both of their goal kicks.

== Legacy ==
The next season, Whittemore wrote to legendary Yale coach Walter Camp asking him to recommend a coach for Stanford; to Whittemore's surprise, Camp agreed to coach the team himself, on the condition that he coach the season at Yale first.

Whittemore's son, also named John Whittemore and also a Stanford student, lived to the age of 104 and was renowned as a masters track and field athlete.
