= 1892 (spring) California Golden Bears football team =

American college football season

1892 (spring) California Golden Bears football
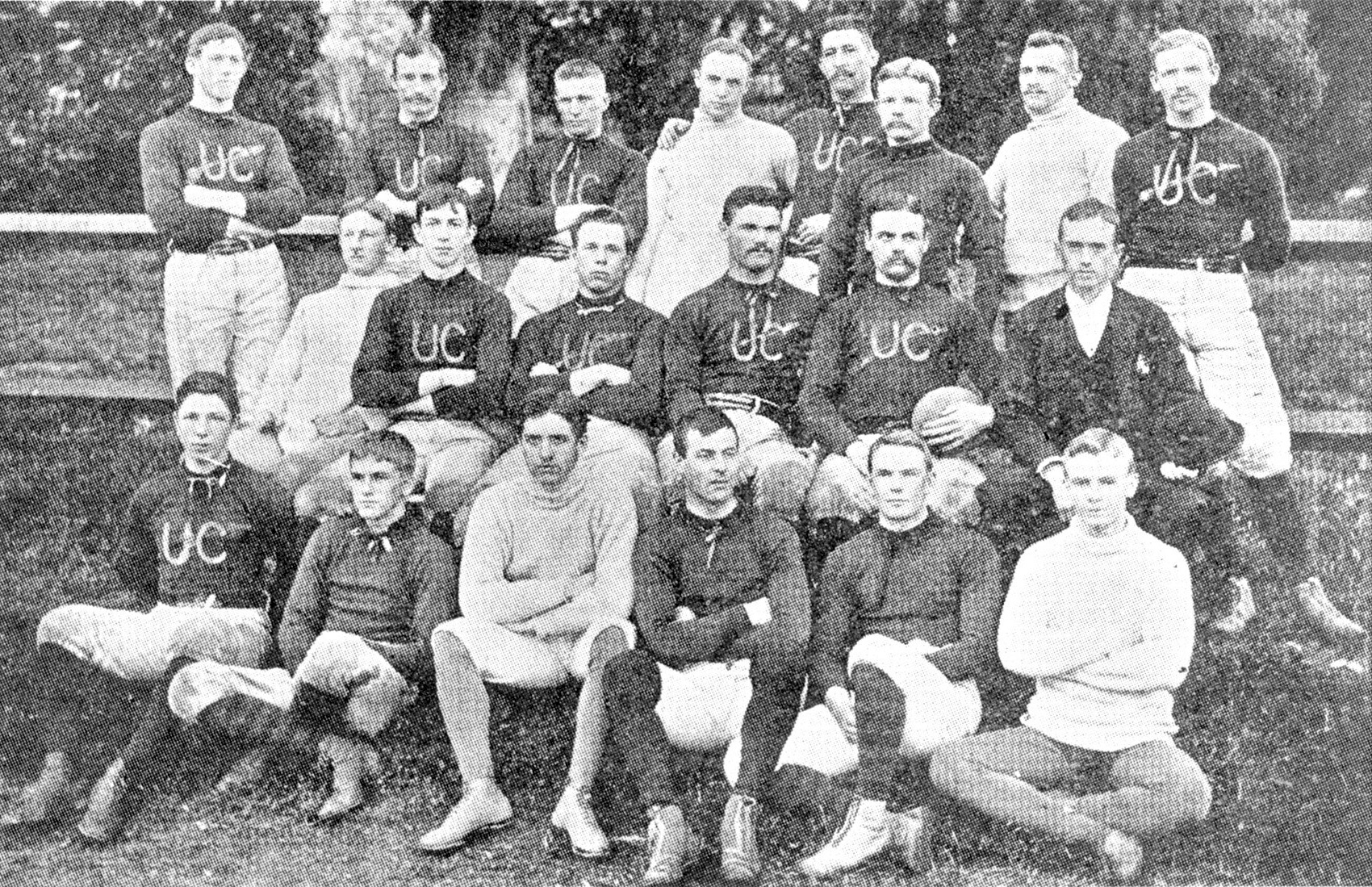
- Conference: Independent
- Record: 4–2
- Head coach: None
- Captain: George H. Foulks

1891 Midwestern college football independents records
	Conf.			Overall
Team	W	L	T	W		L		T
Ohio Wesleyan		–		4	–	0	–	0
Kansas		–		7	–	0	–	1
Illinois		–		5	–	1	–	0
Missouri		–		3	–	1	–	0
Lake Forest		–		6	–	2	–	0
Washington University		–		4	–	1	–	1
Minnesota		–		3	–	1	–	1
Wisconsin		–		3	–	1	–	1
Cincinnati		–		4	–	2	–	1
Iowa		–		3	–	2	–	0
Doane		–		2	–	2	–	0
Iowa College		–		1	–	1	–	1
Miami (OH)		–		1	–	1	–	0
Nebraska		–		2	–	2	–	0
Northwestern		–		2	–	2	–	3
Michigan		–		4	–	5	–	0
Ohio State		–		2	–	3	–	0
Case		–		1	–	2	–	0
Buchtel		–		1	–	3	–	0
Washburn		–		1	–	5	–	0
Michigan State Normal		–		0	–	2	–	0

The 1892 (spring) California Golden Bears football team was an American football team that represented the University of California, Berkeley. The team competed as an independent during the spring of 1892 against teams from the Bay Area. It was Cal's final team without a head coach and compiled a record of 4–2. This season was the first time Cal played against Stanford, establishing that match as the first instance of the Big Game.

== Schedule ==
Date	Time	Opponent	Site	Result	Attendance
December 12		San Francisco Boys High School	Berkeley, CA	W 12–0	
January 5		San Francisco Boys High School	Berkeley, CA	W 14–0	
January 12		Hopkins Academy	Berkeley, CA	W 16–4	
February 3		Berkeley Gymnasium	Berkeley, CA	W 30–0	
February 20		Olympic Club	Berkeley, CA	L 0–6	
March 19	4:00 p.m.	Stanford	Haight Street Grounds; San Francisco, CA (rivalry)	L 10–14	8,000
All times are in Pacific time
