= 1891 USC Methodists football team =

American college football season

1891 USC Methodists football
- Conference: Independent
- Record: 1–2
- Head coach: None
- Captain: Frank Lapham

1891 Midwestern college football independents records
| | Conf. | | | Overall |
| Team | W | L | T | W | | L | | T |
|---|---|---|---|---|---|---|---|---|
| Ohio Wesleyan | | – | | 4 | – | 0 | – | 0 |
| Kansas | | – | | 7 | – | 0 | – | 1 |
| Illinois | | – | | 5 | – | 1 | – | 0 |
| Missouri | | – | | 3 | – | 1 | – | 0 |
| Lake Forest | | – | | 6 | – | 2 | – | 0 |
| Washington University | | – | | 4 | – | 1 | – | 1 |
| Minnesota | | – | | 3 | – | 1 | – | 1 |
| Wisconsin | | – | | 3 | – | 1 | – | 1 |
| Cincinnati | | – | | 4 | – | 2 | – | 1 |
| Iowa | | – | | 3 | – | 2 | – | 0 |
| Doane | | – | | 2 | – | 2 | – | 0 |
| Iowa College | | – | | 1 | – | 1 | – | 1 |
| Miami (OH) | | – | | 1 | – | 1 | – | 0 |
| Nebraska | | – | | 2 | – | 2 | – | 0 |
| Northwestern | | – | | 2 | – | 2 | – | 3 |
| Michigan | | – | | 4 | – | 5 | – | 0 |
| Ohio State | | – | | 2 | – | 3 | – | 0 |
| Case | | – | | 1 | – | 2 | – | 0 |
| Buchtel | | – | | 1 | – | 3 | – | 0 |
| Washburn | | – | | 1 | – | 5 | – | 0 |
| Michigan State Normal | | – | | 0 | – | 2 | – | 0 |

The 1891 USC Methodists football team was an American football team that represented the University of Southern California during the 1891 college football season. The team competed as an independent without a head coach, compiling a 1–2 record.

== Schedule ==
| Date | Opponent | Site | Result |
|---|---|---|---|
| November 26 | Olive Club | Los Angeles, CA | L 12–16 |
| January 23 | SC Academy | Los Angeles, CA | W 34–0 |
| February 22 | St. Vincent's (CA) | Los Angeles, CA | L 2–10 |
