= List of Nebraska Cornhuskers football seasons =

This is a list of Nebraska Cornhuskers football seasons. Nebraska competes as part of the NCAA Division I Football Bowl Subdivision, representing the University of Nebraska–Lincoln in the Big Ten. The team has played 1,394 games across 135 seasons.

Nebraska is among the most storied programs in college football history and has the eighth-most all-time victories among FBS teams. NU has won forty-six conference championships and five national championships (1970, 1971, 1994, 1995, and 1997), along with seven other national titles the school does not claim.

== Seasons ==
Year	Coach	Overall	Conference	Standing	Bowl/playoffs	Coaches^{#}	AP^{°}
Langdon Frothingham (Independent) (1890)
1890	Langdon Frothingham (Note: Nebraska's earliest coaching history is unclear. Many were nominal in their roles and likely only coached single games, if any. Frank Crawford was hired in 1893 as Nebraska's first official head coach.)	2–0					
Theron Lyman (Independent) (1891)
1891	Theron Lyman (Note: Prior to their 1891 meeting in Omaha, Iowa sent assistant Theron Lyman to Lincoln to prepare Nebraska to face the more experienced Hawkeyes. Nebraska credits Lyman as its head coach for the game.)	2–2					
J. S. Williams (WIUFA) (1892)
1892	J. S. Williams (Note: Attorney J. S. Williams was appointed "temporary head coach" in October 1892. His only game was a 1–0 forfeit victory over Missouri.)	2–2–1	1–1–1	2nd			
Frank Crawford (WIUFA) (1893–1894)
1893	Frank Crawford	3–2–1	1–2	3rd			
1894	Frank Crawford	6–2	2–1	1st			
Charles Thomas (WIUFA) (1895)
1895	Charles Thomas	6–3	2–1	T–1st			
Edward N. Robinson (WIUFA) (1896–1897)
1896	Edward N. Robinson	6–3–1	1–1–1	3rd			
1897	Edward N. Robinson	5–1	3–0	1st			
Fielding H. Yost (Independent) (1898)
1898	Fielding H. Yost	8–3					
Alonzo Edwin Branch (Independent) (1899)
1899	Alonzo Edwin Branch	1–7–1					
Walter C. Booth (Independent) (1900–1905)
1900	Walter C. Booth	6–1–1					
1901	Walter C. Booth	6–2					
1902	Walter C. Booth	9–0					
1903	Walter C. Booth	10–0					
1904	Walter C. Booth	7–3					
1905	Walter C. Booth	8–2					
Amos Foster (Independent) (1906)
1906	Amos Foster	6–4					
William C. Cole (MVIAA) (1907–1910)
1907	William C. Cole	8–2	1–0	T–1st			
1908	William C. Cole	7–2–1	2–1	T–2nd			
1909	William C. Cole	3–3–2	0–2–1	T–5th			
1910	William C. Cole	7–1	2–0	1st			
Ewald O. Stiehm (MVIAA) (1911–1915)
1911	Ewald O. Stiehm	5–1–2	2–0–1	T–1st			
1912	Ewald O. Stiehm	7–1	2–0	T–1st			
1913	Ewald O. Stiehm	8–0	3–0	T–1st			
1914	Ewald O. Stiehm	7–0–1	3–0	1st			
1915	Ewald O. Stiehm	8–0	4–0	1st			
E. J. Stewart (MVIAA) (1916–1917)
1916	E. J. Stewart	6–2	3–1	1st			
1917	E. J. Stewart	5–2	2–0	1st			
William G. Kline (MVIAA) (1918)
1918	William G. Kline	2–3–1	0–0	(Note: The MVIAA did not award a champion in 1918 due to World War I and the outbreak of the Spanish flu pandemic.)			
Henry Schulte (Independent) (1919–1920)
1919	Henry Schulte	3–3–2					
1920	Henry Schulte	5–3–1					
Fred Dawson (MVIAA) (1921–1924)
1921	Fred Dawson	7–1	3–0	1st			
1922	Fred Dawson	7–1	5–0	1st			
1923	Fred Dawson	4–2–2	3–0–2	1st			
1924	Fred Dawson	5–3	3–1	2nd			
Ernest Bearg (MVIAA) (1925–1928)
1925	Ernest Bearg	4–2–2	2–2–1	5th			
1926	Ernest Bearg	6–2	5–1	2nd			
1927	Ernest Bearg	6–2	4–1	2nd			
1928	Ernest Bearg	7–1–1	5–0	1st			
Dana X. Bible (MVIAA) (1929–1936)
1929	Dana X. Bible	4–1–3	3–0–2	1st			
1930	Dana X. Bible	4–3–2	2–2–1	4th			
1931	Dana X. Bible	8–2	5–0	1st			
1932	Dana X. Bible	7–1–1	5–0	1st			
1933	Dana X. Bible	8–1	5–0	1st			
1934	Dana X. Bible	6–3	4–1	2nd			
1935	Dana X. Bible	6–2–1	4–0–1	1st			
1936	Dana X. Bible	7–2	5–0	1st			9
Biff Jones (MVIAA) (1937–1941)
1937	Biff Jones	6–1–2	3–0–2	1st			11
1938	Biff Jones	3–5–1	2–3	T–3rd			
1939	Biff Jones	7–1–1	4–1	2nd			18
1940	Biff Jones	8–2	5–0	1st	L Rose		7
1941	Biff Jones	4–5	3–2	T–2nd			
Glenn Presnell (MVIAA) (1942)
1942	Glenn Presnell	3–7	3–2	3rd			
Adolph J. Lewandowski (MVIAA) (1943–1944)
1943	Adolph J. Lewandowski	2–6	2–3	T–4th			
1944	Adolph J. Lewandowski	2–6	2–3	4th			
George Clark (MVIAA) (1945)
1945	George Clark	4–5	2–3	4th			
Bernie Masterson (MVIAA) (1946–1947)
1946	Bernie Masterson	3–6	3–2	T–3rd			
1947	Bernie Masterson	2–7	2–3	4th			
George Clark (MVIAA) (1948)
1948	George Clark	2–8	2–4	T–5th			
Bill Glassford (MVIAA) (1949–1955)
1949	Bill Glassford	4–5	3–3	T–3rd			
1950	Bill Glassford	6–2–1	4–2	2nd		T–20	17
1951	Bill Glassford	2–8	2–4	T–4th			
1952	Bill Glassford	5–4–1	3–2–1	3rd			
1953	Bill Glassford	3–6–1	2–4	T–4th			
1954	Bill Glassford	6–5	4–2	2nd	L Orange		
1955	Bill Glassford	5–5	5–1	2nd			
Pete Elliott (MVIAA) (1956)
1956	Pete Elliott	4–6	3–3	4th			
Bill Jennings (MVIAA) (1957–1961)
1957	Bill Jennings	1–9	1–5	7th			
1958	Bill Jennings	3–7	1–5	6th			
1959	Bill Jennings	4–6	2–4	6th			
1960	Bill Jennings	4–6	2–5	T–6th			
1961	Bill Jennings	3–6–1	2–5	T–6th			
Bob Devaney (MVIAA / Big Eight Conference (Note: In 1928, the ten member schools of the Missouri Valley Intercollegiate Athletic Association agreed to a splintering of the conference – Iowa State, Kansas, Kansas State, Missouri, Nebraska, and Oklahoma retained the MVIAA name and Drake, Grinnell, Oklahoma A&M (now Oklahoma State), and Washington University formed the Missouri Valley Conference. The MVIAA became commonly known as the Big Six, and later the Big Seven and Big Eight. Its name was officially changed to the Big Eight in 1964.)) (1962–1972)
1962	Bob Devaney	9–2	5–2	3rd	W Gotham		
1963	Bob Devaney	10–1	7–0	1st	W Orange	5	6
1964	Bob Devaney	9–2	6–1	1st	L Cotton	6	6
1965	Bob Devaney	10–1	7–0	1st	L Orange	3	5
1966	Bob Devaney	9–2	6–1	1st	L Sugar	7	6
1967	Bob Devaney	6–4	3–4	5th			
1968	Bob Devaney	6–4	3–4	T–4th			
1969	Bob Devaney	9–2	6–1	T–1st	W Sun	12	11
1970	Bob Devaney	11–0–1	7–0	1st	W Orange	3	1
1971	Bob Devaney	13–0	7–0	1st	W Orange	1	1
1972	Bob Devaney	9–2–1	5–1–1	1st	W Orange	9	4
Tom Osborne (Big Eight Conference) (1973–1995)
1973	Tom Osborne	9–2–1	4–2–1	T–2nd	W Cotton	T–11	7
1974	Tom Osborne	9–3	5–2	T–2nd	W Sugar	9	8
1975	Tom Osborne	10–2	6–1	T–1st	L Fiesta	9	9
1976	Tom Osborne	9–3–1	4–3	T–4th	W Astro-Bluebonnet	7	9
1977	Tom Osborne	9–3	5–2	T–2nd	W Liberty	10	12
1978	Tom Osborne	9–3	6–1	T–1st	L Orange	8	8
1979	Tom Osborne	10–2	6–1	2nd	L Cotton	7	9
1980	Tom Osborne	10–2	6–1	2nd	W Sun	7	7
1981	Tom Osborne	9–3	7–0	1st	L Orange	9	11
1982	Tom Osborne	12–1	7–0	1st	W Orange	3	3
1983	Tom Osborne	12–1	7–0	1st	L Orange	2	2
1984	Tom Osborne	10–2	6–1	T–1st	W Sugar	3	4
1985	Tom Osborne	9–3	6–1	2nd	L Fiesta	10	11
1986	Tom Osborne	10–2	5–2	3rd	W Sugar	4	5
1987	Tom Osborne	10–2	6–1	2nd	L Fiesta	6	6
1988	Tom Osborne	11–2	7–0	1st	L Orange	10	10
1989	Tom Osborne	10–2	6–1	2nd	L Fiesta	12	11
1990	Tom Osborne	9–3	5–2	3rd	L Florida Citrus	T–17	24
1991	Tom Osborne	9–2–1	6–0–1	T–1st	L Orange	16	15
1992	Tom Osborne	9–3	6–1	1st	L Orange^{†}	14	14
1993	Tom Osborne	11–1	7–0	1st	L Orange^{†}	3	3
1994	Tom Osborne	13–0	7–0	1st	W Orange^{†}	1	1
1995	Tom Osborne	12–0	7–0	1st	W Fiesta^{†}	1	1
Tom Osborne (Big 12 Conference) (1996–1997)
1996	Tom Osborne	11–2	8–0	1st (North)	W Orange^{†}	6	6
1997	Tom Osborne	13–0	8–0	1st (North)	W Orange^{†}	1	2
Frank Solich (Big 12 Conference) (1998–2003)
1998	Frank Solich	9–4	5–3	T–2nd (North)	L Holiday	20	19
1999	Frank Solich	12–1	7–1	1st (North)	W Fiesta^{†}	2	3
2000	Frank Solich	10–2	6–2	T–1st (North)	W Alamo	7	8
2001	Frank Solich	11–2	7–1	T–1st (North)	L Rose^{†}	7	8
2002	Frank Solich	7–7	3–5	4th (North)	L Independence		
2003	Frank Solich (Note: Frank Solich was fired following the 2003 regular season. Assistant Bo Pelini served as interim head coach in the 2003 Alamo Bowl.)	10–3	5–3	2nd (North)	W Alamo	18	19
Bill Callahan (Big 12 Conference) (2004–2007)
2004	Bill Callahan	5–6	3–5	3rd (North)			
2005	Bill Callahan	8–4	4–4	T–2nd (North)	W Alamo	24	24
2006	Bill Callahan	9–5	6–2	1st (North)	L Cotton		
2007	Bill Callahan	5–7	2–6	T–5th (North)			
Bo Pelini (Big 12 Conference) (2008–2010)
2008	Bo Pelini	9–4	5–3	T–1st (North)	W Gator		
2009	Bo Pelini	10–4	6–2	1st (North)	W Holiday	14	14
2010	Bo Pelini	10–4	6–2	T–1st (North)	L Holiday	19	20
Bo Pelini (Big Ten Conference) (2011–2014)
2011	Bo Pelini	9–4	5–3	3rd (Legends)	L Capital One	24	24
2012	Bo Pelini	10–4	7–1	1st (Legends)	L Capital One	23	25
2013	Bo Pelini	9–4	5–3	T–2nd (Legends)	W Gator	25	
2014	Bo Pelini (Note: Bo Pelini was fired following the 2014 regular season. Assistant Barney Cotton served as interim head coach in the 2014 Holiday Bowl.)	9–4	5–3	T–2nd (West)	L Holiday		
Mike Riley (Big Ten Conference) (2015–2017)
2015	Mike Riley	6–7	3–5	4th (West)	W Foster Farms		
2016	Mike Riley	9–4	6–3	T–2nd (West)	L Music City		
2017	Mike Riley	4–8	3–6	5th (West)			
Scott Frost (Big Ten Conference) (2018–2022)
2018	Scott Frost	4–8	3–6	T–5th (West)			
2019	Scott Frost	5–7	3–6	T–5th (West)			
2020	Scott Frost	3–5	3–5	5th (West)			
2021	Scott Frost	3–9	1–8	T–6th (West)			
2022	Scott Frost (Note: Scott Frost was fired three games into the 2022 season. Assistant Mickey Joseph served as interim head coach for the remainder of the season.)	4–8	3–6	6th (West)			
Matt Rhule (Big Ten Conference) (2023–present)
2023	Matt Rhule	5–7	3–6	T–4th (West)			
2024	Matt Rhule	7–6	3–6	T–12th	W Pinstripe		
2025	Matt Rhule	7–6	4–5	T–10th	L Las Vegas		
2026	Matt Rhule	7-4	4-4				
Total:		938–440–40					
National championship Conference title Conference division title or championship game berth
^{†}Indicates Bowl Coalition, Bowl Alliance, BCS, or CFP / New Years' Six bowl.; ^{#}Rankings from final Coaches Poll.
