= Hal Reid =

Hal Reid may refer to:

- Hal Reid (American football), American football coach.
- Hal Reid (actor) (1863–1920), playwright and actor
