= Herb Alward =

American football player and coach (1865–1897)

Biographical details
- Born: November 1, 1865; Negaunee, Michigan or Oconto, Wisconsin, U.S.
- Died: December 21, 1897 (aged 32); Chicago, Illinois, U.S.

Playing career
- 1890: Harvard
- 1891: University Club of Chicago
- 1892–1893: Chicago Athletic Association
- Positions: Tackle, halfback

Coaching career (HC unless noted)
- 1891: Wisconsin
- 1893: Beloit
- 1895: Armour Institute
- 1895: Rush Medical

James Herbert Alward (November 1, 1865 – December 21, 1897) was an American football player and coach. He served as the third head football coach at the University of Wisconsin–Madison for a single season in 1891, compiling a record of 3–1–1. Alward coached for the Armour Institute (later merged into Illinois Institute of Technology) and Rush Medical College.

Alward attended Harvard University and was a member of the 1890 Harvard Crimson football team, which was later recognized as a national champion. He played amateur club football with Chicago's University Club in 1891 and the Chicago Athletic Association in 1892 and 1893, serving as team captain in 1893.

Alward died of typhoid fever, on December 21, 1897, at his home in Chicago.

== Head coaching record ==
Year	Team	Overall	Conference	Standing	Bowl/playoffs
Wisconsin Badgers (Independent) (1891)
1891	Wisconsin	3–1–1			
Wisconsin:		3–1–1			
Beloit (Independent) (1893)
1893	Beloit	4–3			
Beloit:		4–3			
Rush-Lake Forest (Independent) (1895)
1895	Rush-Lake Forest				
Rush-Lake Forest:					
Total:		3–1–1			
