= 1891 Minnesota Golden Gophers football team =

American college football season

1891 Minnesota Golden Gophers football
- Conference: Independent
- Record: 3–1–1
- Head coach: Edward Moulton (1st season)
- Captain: William C. Leary

1891 Midwestern college football independents records
	Conf.			Overall
Team	W	L	T	W		L		T
Ohio Wesleyan		–		4	–	0	–	0
Kansas		–		7	–	0	–	1
Illinois		–		5	–	1	–	0
Missouri		–		3	–	1	–	0
Lake Forest		–		6	–	2	–	0
Washington University		–		4	–	1	–	1
Minnesota		–		3	–	1	–	1
Wisconsin		–		3	–	1	–	1
Cincinnati		–		4	–	2	–	1
Iowa		–		3	–	2	–	0
Doane		–		2	–	2	–	0
Iowa College		–		1	–	1	–	1
Miami (OH)		–		1	–	1	–	0
Nebraska		–		2	–	2	–	0
Northwestern		–		2	–	2	–	3
Michigan		–		4	–	5	–	0
Ohio State		–		2	–	3	–	0
Case		–		1	–	2	–	0
Buchtel		–		1	–	3	–	0
Washburn		–		1	–	5	–	0
Michigan State Normal		–		0	–	2	–	0

The 1891 Minnesota Golden Gophers football team represented the University of Minnesota as an independent in the 1891 college football season. It was the only season under head coach Edward Moulton and it saw Minnesota's first out-of-state trip with a pair of games in Iowa. The first of these games was against Iowa College and ended in a 12–12 tie. The second game was Minnesota's first meeting with long-time rival Iowa and resulted in an 42–4 Minnesota victory.

== Schedule ==
Date	Opponent	Site	Result	Source
October 17	Ex-Collegiates	Minneapolis, MN	L 0–4	
October 24	Wisconsin	Athletic Park; Minneapolis, MN (rivalry)	W 26–12	
October 31	at Iowa College	Grinnell, IA	T 12–12	
November 2	at Iowa	Iowa City, IA (rivalry)	W 42–4	
November 14	Iowa College	Minneapolis, MN	W 22–14	

== Roster ==
- Center, James Madigan
- Tackles, George Sikes, R. C. Dewey
- Guards, Charles G. Flanagan, Everhard P. Harding
- Ends, L. C. Edson, E.C. Bisbee, David R. Burbank
- Halfbacks, Eugene L. Patterson, William C. Leary (captain)
- Quarterback, Alfred F. Pillsbury
- Fullback, Charles S. Hale
- Substitutes, George Hawley, Russell H. Folwell, John C. Ohnstad, Grant B. Rossman, A. T. Larson, A. J. Harris, R. L. Cramb
- Coach/trainer Edward Moulton.
