= James Van Inwagen =

American businessman

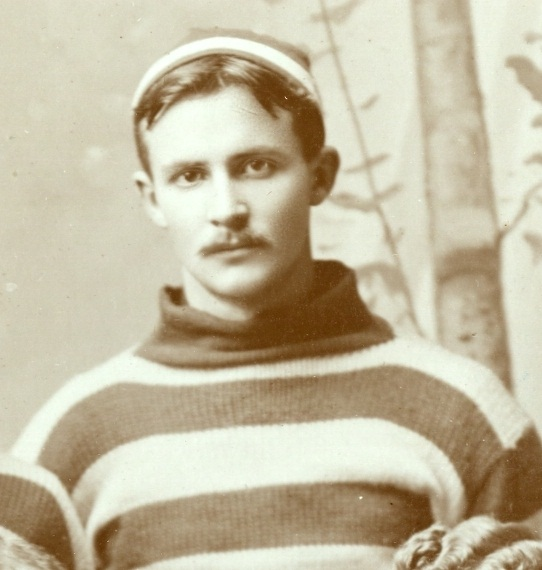
- Born: May 16, 1869
- Died: September 1, 1928 (aged 59); Buffalo, New York
- Citizenship: United States
- Education: University of Michigan
- Known for: Businessman, athlete

James W. Van Inwagen Jr. (May 16, 1869 – September 1, 1928) was an American businessman and a member of the Tiffany family. He played college football for the University of Michigan from 1888 to 1891 and was captain of the 1891 Michigan Wolverines football team. After graduating from Michigan, he operated the Tiffany Enameled Brick Company in Illinois with his father, James Van Inwagen Sr. He later moved to New York where he served as the president of the Tiffany Electric Manufacturing Company, the maker of Tiffany Never-Wind Clocks.

== Early years ==
Born in 1869, Van Inwagen's mother was Mary Louise Tiffany and his father was James Van Inwagen Sr. He received his preparatory education at Phillips Exeter from which he graduated in 1888.

== University of Michigan ==
After graduating from Phillips Exeter, Van Inwagen attended the University of Michigan. He played college football for the Michigan Wolverines football team from 1888 to 1891 as a fullback, end and halfback. He was the captain of the 1891 Michigan Wolverines football team. Van Inwagen was also competitor in track and field. In 1888, he won the running high jump event at the University of Michigan Field Day with a jump of 5 feet, 6 inches. He also placed second in the 120 yard hurdles after falling over one of the hurdles.

== Family and personal life ==
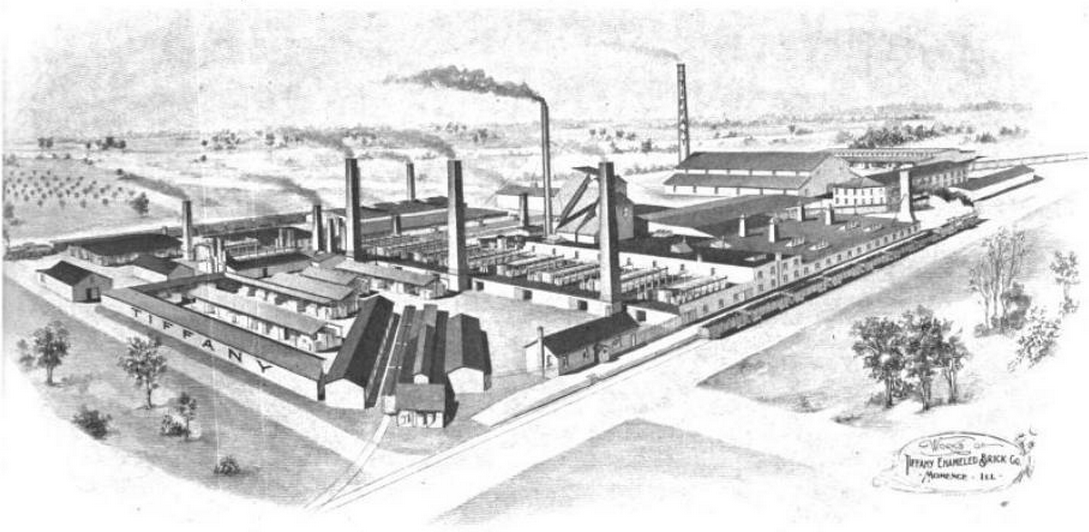
Tiffany Enameled Brick Works, 1904

In April 1901, Van Inwagen married Mildred Mabel Congdon. They had one child, Jean, born in 1901.

Van Inwagen's younger brother, Arthur Van Inwagen, committed suicide in 1898; he shot himself at the Denver Athletic Club. His father died of malarial fever in November 1904 at Van Inwagen's home. His oldest brother, Fred Van Inwagen, committed suicide in 1905 at age 45.

On New Year's Eve 1902, Van Inwagen was arrested and charged with assault, disorderly conduct and using abusive language. According to the arresting officers, he entered the Polk Street Depot in downtown Chicago and asked a train dispatcher for a special train to take him to Momence. When he was refused, he allegedly attacked the dispatcher. He was locked up at the Harrison Street station but later released on bond.

== Business career ==
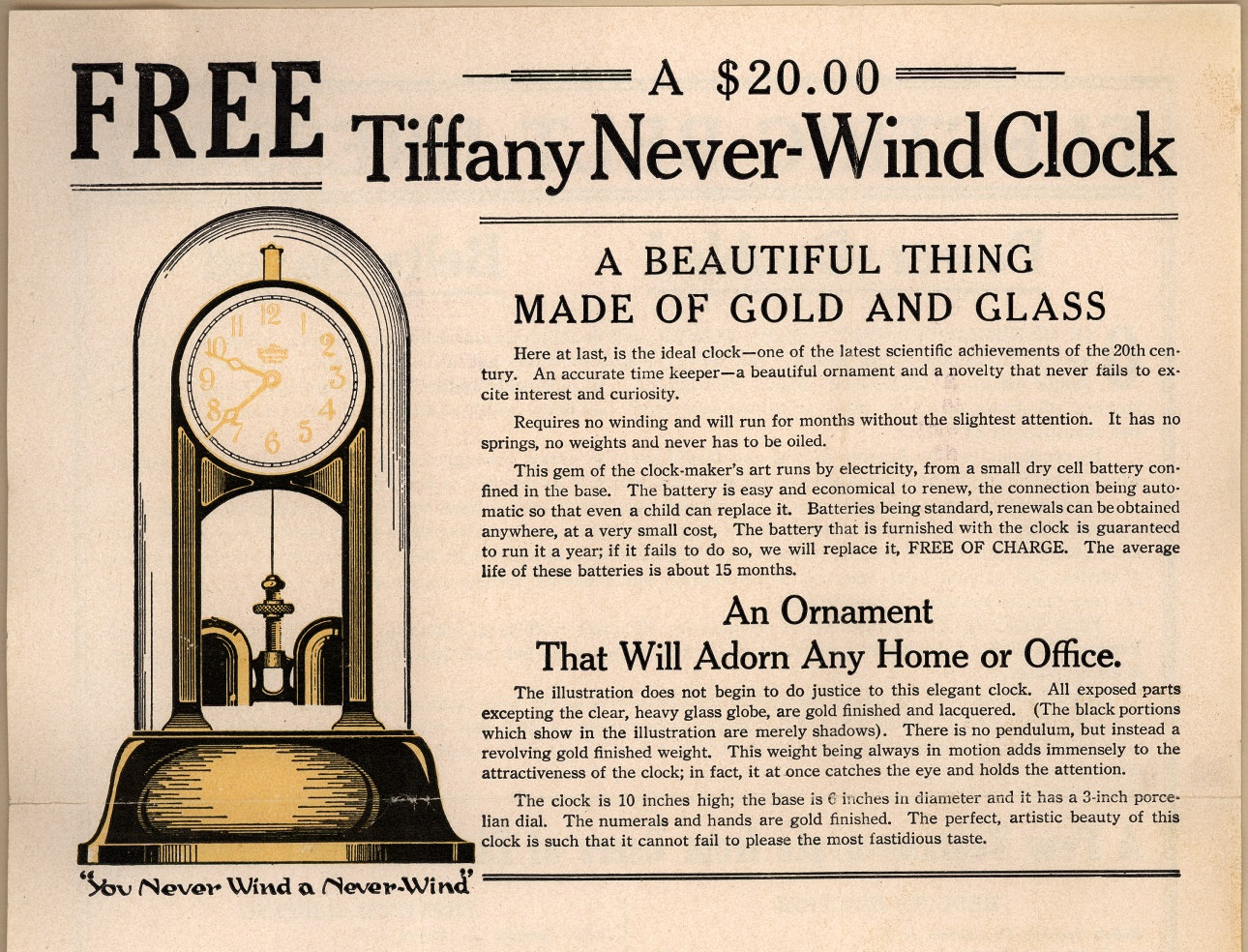
Ad for "Tiffany Never-Wind Clock", 1919

After graduating from Michigan, Van Inwagen joined his father at the Tiffany Enameled Brick Co. in Momence, Illinois. Van Inwagen served as the vice president and manager, while his father was president and treasurer. An article on the company in the early 1900s noted that Van Inwagen "bears on his shoulders with ease the many burdens resultant from his position. Mr. Van Inwagen is a young man, not bound in any way by traditional practice, eager to embrace all devices calculated to improve the product of the plant and lessen the cost of production." Van Inwagen published articles about the company's enameled brick products in building industry publications.

By January 1907, Van Inwagen had moved to New York City, where he was the president of the Tiffany Electric Manufacturing Company Among the products manufactured by the company were never-wind electric clocks. By 1912, Van Inwagen had moved the company to Buffalo, New York. By 1918, some seven models were offered. Though fairly expensive, the "Tiffany Never-Winds" enjoyed success. Van Inwagen was still with the Tiffany Electric Manufacturing Company in 1919.

== Later years ==
At the time of the 1920 United States Census, Van Inwagen was married to Mildred Van Inwagen and residing in Buffalo with their daughter Jean Van Inwagen.
