= Edwin Mortimer Hopkins =

American university professor & college football coach (1862-1946)

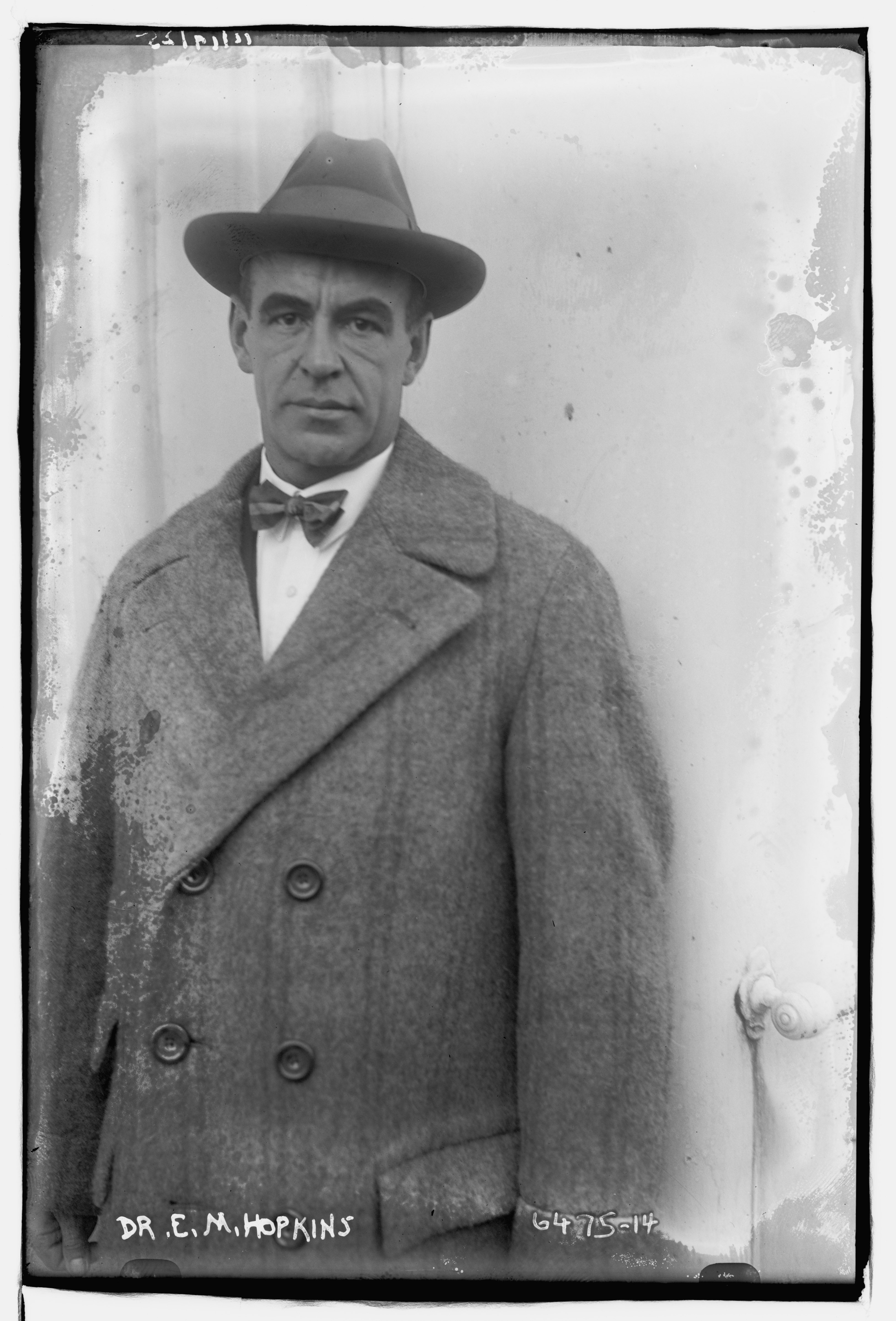

Biographical details
- Born: September 16, 1862; Kent, New York, U.S.
- Died: June 13, 1946 (aged 83); Lawrence, Kansas, U.S.
- Education: Princeton

Coaching career (HC unless noted)
- 1891: Kansas

Head coaching record
- Overall: 7–0–1

Edwin Mortimer Hopkins (September 16, 1862 – June 13, 1946) was an American university professor and college football coach. He served on the faculty at the University of Kansas from 1891 to 1937, where he was the head of the English department for many years. He was also the head coach for the school's football team for their 1891 season, their first official head coach. Hopkins graduated from Princeton University in 1888 with a bachelor's degree in English and earned a master's degree the following year. While at Princeton he was elected to the "Lit" board in 1888. That same year he won "The Lippincott prize" of $50 for writing the best article on "Social Life at Princeton". He returned to Princeton to complete his PhD in 1894, and upon his return to KU he became a full professor in English.

== Coaching career ==
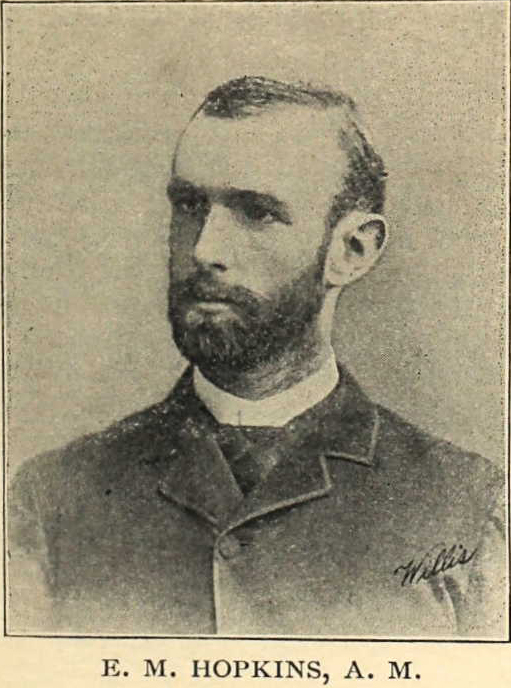
Hopkins in 1893 as an associate professor in English at the University of Kansas

While Hopkins never played football, he was hired to be the first head football coach of the Kansas Jayhawks for the second season of the program's history. For the most part, he was hired because he had recently arrived at the university from back east, where the sport had already been established for several decades and was quickly gaining in popularity, which gave him a fresh thorough understanding of the game. He led the team to an undefeated season with a mark of 7–0–1.

At the University of Kansas, Hopkins was instrumental in founding several regional and national organizations. He was a founder of the Quill Club, the English Journal, and the Kansas Association of Teachers of English. As he was a direct descendant of Stephen Hopkins, one of the passengers of the Mayflower, he founded the Kansas Society of Mayflower Descendants. He was a charter member of the American Association of University Professors, and played an important role in the formation of the National Council of Teachers of English, where he served as director for several years and president in 1915. He was also the director of a large national survey on the cost and labor of English in the United States from 1913 to 1931 backed by the United States Bureau of Education, the National Education Association, the Modern Language Association, and the National Council. In 1905, he reorganized the University Daily Kansan as part of his work reorganizing the school of Journalism at the university, which he had begun in 1903.

== Later life and death ==
Hopkins had a lifelong love of music. As an officer of the Philadelphian Society at Yale in 1888, he served as their official organist. Later, while living in Lawrence, Kansas, he served as an organist and choir director at three different churches, spending his last 25 years as the organist of the Lawrence Baptist Church.

Hopkins died on June 13, 1946, in Lawrence, Kansas at the age of 83. He was married until his wife's death in 1944. He and his wife had no children. He and his wife were buried in the First Presbyterian Church Cemetery in Metuchen, New Jersey.

== Head coaching record ==
Year	Team	Overall	Conference	Standing	Bowl/playoffs
Kansas Jayhawks (Kansas Intercollegiate Athletic Association) (1891)
1891	Kansas	7–0–1			
Kansas:		7–0–1			
Total:		7–0–1			
