= Charles G. Flanagan =

American football player and coach (1872–1937)

Biographical details
- Born: July 4, 1872; Yankton, Dakota Territory, U.S.
- Died: September 24, 1937 (aged 65); Seattle, Washington, U.S.

Playing career
- 1891: Minnesota
- 1899–1901: Chicago
- Positions: Guard, tackle

Coaching career (HC unless noted)
- 1902: Morningside

Head coaching record
- Overall: 1–2

Charles Gibbons Flanagan (July 4, 1872 – September 24, 1937) was an American college football player and coach. Flanagan served as the head football coach at Morningside College in Sioux City, Iowa in 1902. He was later a missionary and known as "bishop of the Olympics".

== Head coaching record ==
Year	Team	Overall	Conference	Standing	Bowl/playoffs
Morningside (Independent) (1902)
1902	Morningside	1–2			
Morningside:		1–2			
Total:		1–2			
