= Theron Lyman =

American football player and coach (1869–1939)

Biographical details
- Born: September 7, 1869; Alden, Iowa, U.S.
- Died: September 21, 1939 (aged 70); Bridgeport, Connecticut, U.S.

Playing career
- 1888–1891: Iowa College
- 1892–1894: Wisconsin
- Position: Quarterback

Coaching career (HC unless noted)
- 1891: Iowa College
- 1891: Nebraska

Head coaching record
- Overall: 3-3

Theron Upson Lyman (September 7, 1869 – September 21, 1939) was an American college football player and coach. He was also the chief examiners of claims of the Travelers Life Insurance Company of Hartford, Connecticut.

== Early years ==
Theron Upson Lyman was born September 7, 1869, in Alden, Iowa. His father C. N. Lyman was a long-time reverend of Onawa. It is said Theron spent time at Yale University.

== Playing career ==
=== Grinnell ===
Lyman played for Iowa College (later named Grinnell College), in Grinnell, Iowa from 1888 to 1891.

==== 1891 ====
He was the coach of the team as well in 1891, in addition to coaching Nebraska for a single game. One account reads "Iowa had an eleven and had a coach, and wanted to play the upstarts from across the Missouri River...So, with a magnanimity seldom equaled in the game's history, Iowa lent its coach, T. U. Lyman, to tutor the Nebraskans."

=== Wisconsin ===
Lyman was a prominent quarterback for the Wisconsin Badgers football team. He was captain every year he played.

==== 1893 ====
Parke H. Davis was coach in 1893.

==== 1894 ====
Lyman transferred to Wisconsin in order to defeat Minnesota, which he finally did in 1894.

== Head coaching record ==
Year	Team	Overall	Conference	Standing	Bowl/playoffs
Iowa College Pioneers (Independent) (1891)
1891	Iowa College	3–2–1			
Iowa College:		3–2–1			
Nebraska (Independent) (1891)
1891	Nebraska	0–1*			
Nebraska:		0–1			
Total:		3–3–1			

*Lyman was coach for preparing Nebraska for the game against Iowa only.

== See also ==
- Minnesota–Wisconsin football rivalry
