= 1891 Wisconsin Badgers football team =

American college football season

1891 Wisconsin Badgers football
- Conference: Independent
- Record: 3–1–1
- Head coach: Herb Alward (1st season)
- Captain: Edwin H. Ahara
- Home stadium: Randall Field

1891 Midwestern college football independents records
	Conf.			Overall
Team	W	L	T	W		L		T
Ohio Wesleyan		–		4	–	0	–	0
Kansas		–		7	–	0	–	1
Illinois		–		5	–	1	–	0
Missouri		–		3	–	1	–	0
Lake Forest		–		6	–	2	–	0
Washington University		–		4	–	1	–	1
Minnesota		–		3	–	1	–	1
Wisconsin		–		3	–	1	–	1
Cincinnati		–		4	–	2	–	1
Iowa		–		3	–	2	–	0
Doane		–		2	–	2	–	0
Iowa College		–		1	–	1	–	1
Miami (OH)		–		1	–	1	–	0
Nebraska		–		2	–	2	–	0
Northwestern		–		2	–	2	–	3
Michigan		–		4	–	5	–	0
Ohio State		–		2	–	3	–	0
Case		–		1	–	2	–	0
Buchtel		–		1	–	3	–	0
Washburn		–		1	–	5	–	0
Michigan State Normal		–		0	–	2	–	0

The 1891 Wisconsin Badgers football team represented the University of Wisconsin as an independent during the 1891 college football season. Led by Herb Alward in his first and only season as head coach, the Badgers compiled a record of 3–1–1. The team's captain was Edwin H. Ahara.

== Schedule ==
Date	Opponent	Site	Result	Source
October 17	at Beloit	Beloit, WI	W 40–4	
October 24	at Minnesota	Athletic Park; Minneapolis, MN (rivalry)	L 12–26	
October 31	vs. Northwestern	Athletic Park; Milwaukee, WI	T 0–0	
November 14	Lake Forest	Randall Field; Madison, WI	W 6–4	
November 29	vs. Northwestern	Athletic Park; Milwaukee, WI	W 40–0	
