= Hal Reid (American football) =

American football coach

Hal Reed
Coaching career (HC unless noted)
- 1891: Missouri

Head coaching record
- Overall: 3–1

Hal Reed was an American college football coach. He was the second head football coach at the University of Missouri in Columbia, Missouri, serving for one season, in 1891, and compiling a record of 3–1.

== Head coaching record ==
Year	Team	Overall	Conference	Standing
Missouri Tigers (Independent) (1891)
1891	Missouri	2–1		
Missouri:		3–1		
Total:		3–1		
