= Iowa–Nebraska football rivalry =

American college football rivalry

- Iowa Hawkeyes Nebraska Cornhuskers
- Sport: Football
- First meeting: November 26, 1891; Iowa, 20–0
- Latest meeting: November 28, 2025; Iowa, 40–16
- Next meeting: November 27, 2026, Iowa City
- Trophy: Heroes Trophy

Statistics
- Total meetings: 56
- All-time series: Nebraska leads, 30–23–3 (.563)
- Trophy series: Iowa leads, 11–4
- Largest victory: Nebraska, 57–0 (1980)
- Longest win streak: Nebraska, 8 (1931–1941)
- Current win streak: Iowa, 3 (2023–present)

Locations of Iowa and Nebraska

The Iowa–Nebraska football rivalry, also known as the Heroes Game, is an American college football rivalry between the Iowa Hawkeyes and Nebraska Cornhuskers. The game is held annually on Black Friday.

== History ==
=== Non-conference series ===
Iowa and Nebraska first met on November 26, 1891, in Omaha, Iowa's first-ever game outside its home state. Nebraska credits Iowa assistant Theron Lyman, who was sent to Lincoln days early to prepare an inexperienced NU team to face the more experienced Hawkeyes, as its head coach for the game, though he likely did not attend Iowa's 22–0 win. The following year, the schools became founding members of the short-lived Western Interstate University Football Association, one of college football's first conferences.

The proximity of the two teams played an important role in the early days of the game, with exclusive trains running between Iowa City and Lincoln to allow fans to travel. The series was paused for decades until being renewed from 1979 to 1982. In 1979, No. 7 Nebraska overcame a two-touchdown second-half deficit to beat unranked Iowa, resulting in a standing ovation from fans of both teams. Two years later, Iowa upset No. 7 Nebraska at Kinnick Stadium in what head coach Hayden Fry called "the biggest win since I've been here."

=== Conference series ===
Nebraska has played a rivalry game on the day after Thanksgiving since 1990, first against Oklahoma and later against Colorado. Iowa became NU's traditional Black Friday opponent when the Cornhuskers joined the Big Ten Conference in 2011. Established as the "Heroes Game," it is used to recognize individuals from both states for acts of heroism in their communities.

In 2017, the Big Ten announced that the Iowa–Nebraska game would not take place on Black Friday in 2020 or 2021. After significant pushback from fans and public opposition from NU athletic director Bill Moos, the change was reverted.

Iowa has won ten of the eleven meetings since 2014, the year Nebraska fired Bo Pelini one day after a regular season-finale win over the Hawkeyes. The series is played annually as one of twelve Big Ten protected rivalries; even-year games are played in Iowa City and odd-year games in Lincoln.

== Game results ==
Iowa victories	Nebraska victories

No.	Date	Location	Winning team		Losing team	
1	November 26, 1891	Omaha	Iowa	22	Nebraska	0
2	November 24, 1892	Omaha	Tie	10	Tie	10
3	November 30, 1893	Omaha	Nebraska	20	Iowa	18
4	November 29, 1894	Omaha	Nebraska	36	Iowa	0
5	November 28, 1895	Omaha	Nebraska	6	Iowa	0
6	November 26, 1896	Omaha	Tie	0	Tie	0
7	November 28, 1896	Omaha	Iowa	6	Nebraska	0
8	November 25, 1897	Council Bluffs	Nebraska	6	Iowa	0
9	November 24, 1898	Council Bluffs	Iowa	6	Nebraska	5
10	November 4, 1899	Omaha	Iowa	30	Nebraska	0
11	October 31, 1903	Iowa City	Nebraska	17	Iowa	6
12	November 5, 1904	Lincoln	Nebraska	17	Iowa	12
13	October 31, 1908	Iowa City	Nebraska	11	Iowa	8
14	October 23, 1909	Lincoln	Tie	6	Tie	6
15	November 22, 1913	Lincoln	Nebraska	12	Iowa	0
16	November 21, 1914	Iowa City	Nebraska	16	Iowa	7
17	November 20, 1915	Lincoln	Nebraska	52	Iowa	7
18	November 25, 1916	Iowa City	Nebraska	34	Iowa	17
19	October 13, 1917	Lincoln	Nebraska	47	Iowa	0
20	October 5, 1918	Lincoln	Iowa	12	Nebraska	0
21	October 4, 1919	Iowa City	Iowa	18	Nebraska	0
22	November 22, 1930	Iowa City	Iowa	12	Nebraska	7
23	November 7, 1931	Lincoln	Nebraska	7	Iowa	0
24	November 5, 1932	Iowa City	Nebraska	14	Iowa	13
25	November 25, 1933	Lincoln	Nebraska	7	Iowa	6
26	October 13, 1934	Lincoln	Nebraska	14	Iowa	13
27	November 20, 1937	Lincoln	Nebraska	28	Iowa	0
28	November 19, 1938	Iowa City	Nebraska	14	Iowa	0
29	November 9, 1940	Lincoln	Nebraska	14	Iowa	6
30	November 22, 1941	Lincoln	Nebraska	14	Iowa	13
31	September 26, 1942	Iowa City	Iowa	27	Nebraska	0
32	November 20, 1943	Lincoln	Iowa	33	Nebraska	13
33	November 4, 1944	Iowa City	Iowa	27	Nebraska	6
34	November 24, 1945	Lincoln	Nebraska	13	Iowa	6
35	October 12, 1946	Iowa City	Iowa	21	Nebraska	7
36	September 22, 1979	Iowa City	#7 Nebraska	24	Iowa	21
37	September 20, 1980	Lincoln	#6 Nebraska	57	Iowa	0
38	September 12, 1981	Iowa City	Iowa	10	#7 Nebraska	7
39	September 11, 1982	Lincoln	#3 Nebraska	42	Iowa	7
40	September 4, 1999	Iowa City	#5 Nebraska	42	Iowa	7
41	September 23, 2000	Lincoln	#1 Nebraska	42	Iowa	13
42	November 25, 2011	Lincoln	#22 Nebraska	20	Iowa	7
43	November 23, 2012	Iowa City	#17 Nebraska	13	Iowa	7
44	November 29, 2013	Lincoln	Iowa	38	Nebraska	17
45	November 28, 2014	Iowa City	Nebraska	37	Iowa	34^{OT}
46	November 27, 2015	Lincoln	#3 Iowa	28	Nebraska	20
47	November 25, 2016	Iowa City	Iowa	40	#16 Nebraska	10
48	November 24, 2017	Lincoln	Iowa	56	Nebraska	14
49	November 23, 2018	Iowa City	Iowa	31	Nebraska	28
50	November 29, 2019	Lincoln	#17 Iowa	27	Nebraska	24
51	November 27, 2020	Iowa City	#24 Iowa	26	Nebraska	20
52	November 26, 2021	Lincoln	#16 Iowa	28	Nebraska	21
53	November 25, 2022	Iowa City	Nebraska	24	Iowa	17
54	November 24, 2023	Lincoln	#17 Iowa	13	Nebraska	10
55	November 29, 2024	Iowa City	Iowa	13	Nebraska	10
56	November 28, 2025	Lincoln	Iowa	40	Nebraska	16
57	November 27, 2026	Iowa City				
Series: Nebraska leads 30–23–3

== See also ==
- List of NCAA college football rivalry games
- Iowa–Nebraska men's basketball rivalry
