= 1891 Illinois Fighting Illini football team =

American college football season

1891 Illinois Fighting Illini football
- Conference: Independent
- Record: 5–1
- Head coach: Robert Lackey (1st season)
- Captain: Ralph W. Hart
- Home stadium: Illinois Field

1891 Midwestern college football independents records
	Conf.			Overall
Team	W	L	T	W		L		T
Ohio Wesleyan		–		4	–	0	–	0
Kansas		–		7	–	0	–	1
Illinois		–		5	–	1	–	0
Missouri		–		3	–	1	–	0
Lake Forest		–		6	–	2	–	0
Washington University		–		4	–	1	–	1
Minnesota		–		3	–	1	–	1
Wisconsin		–		3	–	1	–	1
Cincinnati		–		4	–	2	–	1
Iowa		–		3	–	2	–	0
Doane		–		2	–	2	–	0
Iowa College		–		1	–	1	–	1
Miami (OH)		–		1	–	1	–	0
Nebraska		–		2	–	2	–	0
Northwestern		–		2	–	2	–	3
Michigan		–		4	–	5	–	0
Ohio State		–		2	–	3	–	0
Case		–		1	–	2	–	0
Buchtel		–		1	–	3	–	0
Washburn		–		1	–	5	–	0
Michigan State Normal		–		0	–	2	–	0

The 1891 Illinois Fighting Illini football team was an American football team that represented the University of Illinois during the 1891 college football season. It was the second football team in the program's history. Coached by Robert Lackey, the team compiled a 5–1 record. Fullback Ralph W. Hart was the team captain.

== Schedule ==
Date	Opponent	Site	Result
October 1	at Lake Forest	Lake Forest, IL	L 0–8
October 17	Indiana	Illinois Field; Champaign, IL	W 26–0
November 7	Eureka	Illinois Field; Champaign, IL	W 40–0
November 13	Illinois Wesleyan	Illinois Field; Champaign, IL	W 44–4
November 21	Knox (IL)	Illinois Field; Champaign, IL	W 12–0
November 26	Indiana	Illinois Field; Champaign, IL	W 20–12

== Roster ==
- Arms, Frank D. HB
- Armstrong, James W. LT
- Atherton, Geo H. LE
- Barker, John K. RG
- Bush, Arthur W. QB
- Cook, James W. QB
- Doxey, Samuel C
- Gates, Andrew W. LG
- Hart, Ralph W. FB (capt)
- King, Harless W. RE
- Needham, James LT
- Parker, Walter A. RT
- Slater, William F. LHB
- Steele, James LG
- Williams, Scott FB/E
- Wright, Royal RHB
