= 1891 Doane Tigers football team =

American college football season

1891 Doane Tigers football
- Conference: Independent
- Record: 2–2
- Head coach: None

1891 Midwestern college football independents records
	Conf.			Overall
Team	W	L	T	W		L		T
Ohio Wesleyan		–		4	–	0	–	0
Kansas		–		7	–	0	–	1
Illinois		–		5	–	1	–	0
Missouri		–		3	–	1	–	0
Lake Forest		–		6	–	2	–	0
Washington University		–		4	–	1	–	1
Minnesota		–		3	–	1	–	1
Wisconsin		–		3	–	1	–	1
Cincinnati		–		4	–	2	–	1
Iowa		–		3	–	2	–	0
Doane		–		2	–	2	–	0
Iowa College		–		1	–	1	–	1
Miami (OH)		–		1	–	1	–	0
Nebraska		–		2	–	2	–	0
Northwestern		–		2	–	2	–	3
Michigan		–		4	–	5	–	0
Ohio State		–		2	–	3	–	0
Case		–		1	–	2	–	0
Buchtel		–		1	–	3	–	0
Washburn		–		1	–	5	–	0
Michigan State Normal		–		0	–	2	–	0

The 1891 Doane Tigers football team represented Doane College in the 1891 college football season.

== Schedule ==
Date	Time	Opponent	Site	Result	Attendance	Source
		Hastings		W 36–0		
October 31	3:30 p.m.	at Nebraska	Lincoln Park; Lincoln, NE	L 4–28	>800	
November 14		Nebraska	Crete, NE	W 14–12		
December 5		Nebraska	Crete, NE	L 0–32		
All times are in Central time
