= 1891 Michigan Wolverines football team =

American college football season

1891 Michigan Wolverines football
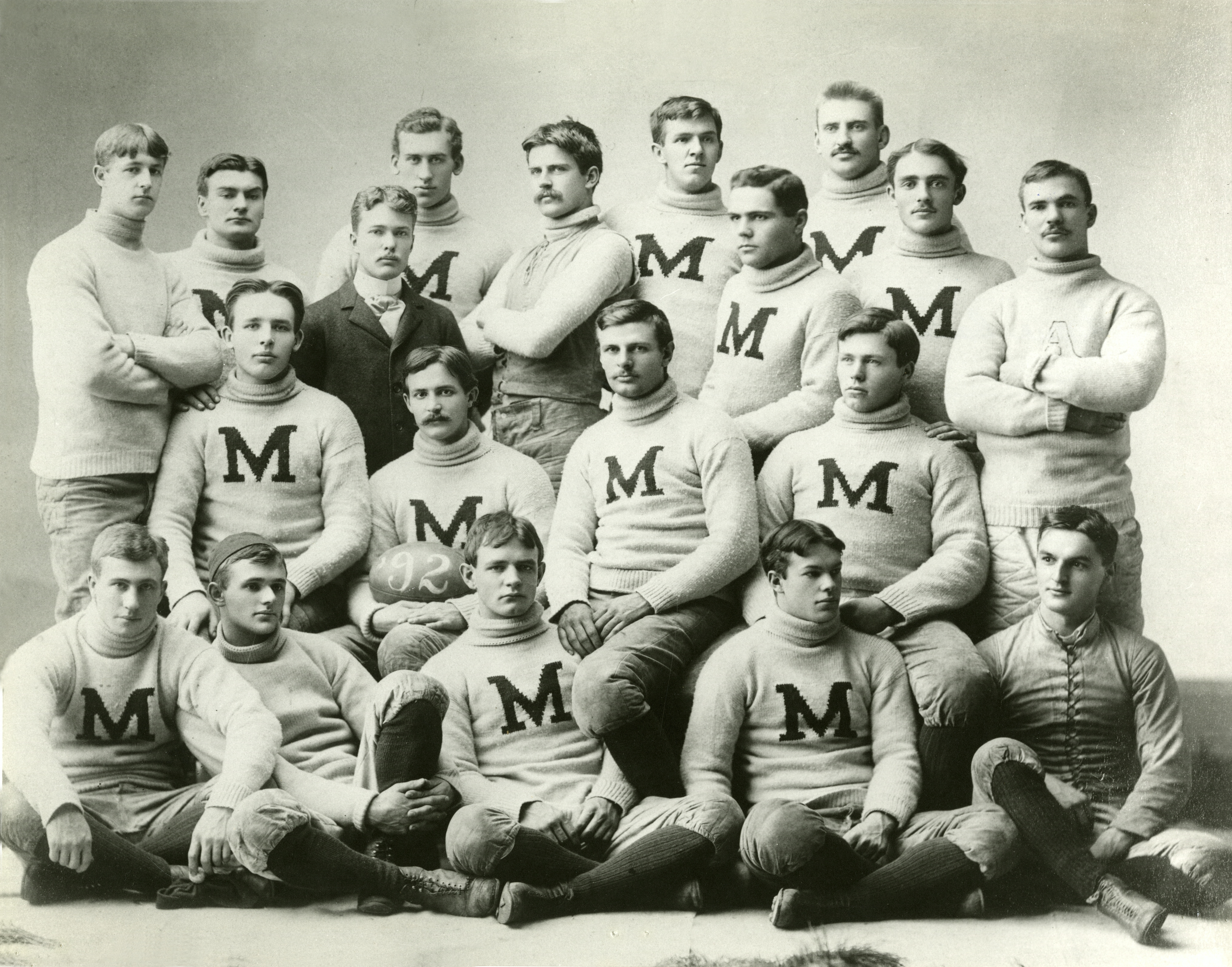
- Conference: Independent
- Record: 4–5
- Head coach: Frank Crawford & Mike Murphy (1st season)
- Captain: James Van Inwagen
- Home stadium: Ann Arbor Fairgrounds

1891 Midwestern college football independents records
	Conf.			Overall
Team	W	L	T	W		L		T
Ohio Wesleyan		–		4	–	0	–	0
Kansas		–		7	–	0	–	1
Illinois		–		5	–	1	–	0
Missouri		–		3	–	1	–	0
Lake Forest		–		6	–	2	–	0
Washington University		–		4	–	1	–	1
Minnesota		–		3	–	1	–	1
Wisconsin		–		3	–	1	–	1
Cincinnati		–		4	–	2	–	1
Iowa		–		3	–	2	–	0
Doane		–		2	–	2	–	0
Iowa College		–		1	–	1	–	1
Miami (OH)		–		1	–	1	–	0
Nebraska		–		2	–	2	–	0
Northwestern		–		2	–	2	–	3
Michigan		–		4	–	5	–	0
Ohio State		–		2	–	3	–	0
Case		–		1	–	2	–	0
Buchtel		–		1	–	3	–	0
Washburn		–		1	–	5	–	0
Michigan State Normal		–		0	–	2	–	0

The 1891 Michigan Wolverines football team was an American football team that represented the University of Michigan in the 1891 college football season. The team compiled a 4–5 record and outscored opponents by a total of 168 to 124.

James Van Inwagen was the team captain. Frank Crawford was the team's coach, assisted by Mike Murphy.

== Schedule ==
Date	Opponent	Site	Result	Attendance
October 10	Ann Arbor High School	Ann Arbor Fairgrounds; Ann Arbor, MI	W 62–0	
October 17	Albion	Ann Arbor Fairgrounds; Ann Arbor, MI	L 4–10	
October 19	at Olivet	Olivet, MI	W 18–6	
October 24	Oberlin	Ann Arbor Fairgrounds; Ann Arbor, MI	W 26–6	
October 31	Butler	Ann Arbor Fairgrounds; Ann Arbor, MI	W 42–6	
November 14	at Chicago University Club	Chicago, IL	L 0–20	
November 21	vs. Cornell	D.A.C. Park; Detroit, MI	L 12–58	2,300
November 26	at Cleveland Athletic Club	Cleveland Athletic Club; Cleveland, OH	L 4–8	5,000
November 28	vs. Cornell	South Side Park; Chicago, IL	L 0–10	300

== Season summary ==
=== Michigan's first football coach ===
The 1891 season was the first in which the Michigan football team had a coach. In his history of the University of Michigan, Wilfred Byron Shaw cites the hiring of Frank Crawford as a watershed moment in the history of the school's football program: "A new era in the history of football at Michigan began in 1891, when with a fair schedule and an experienced coach, Frank Crawford . . ., the systematic development of a team began ..." Crawford was an 1891 graduate of Yale University who was enrolled at the University of Michigan School of Law. As a first-year law student, Crawford was both the unpaid coach and a substitute player for the 1891 team.

Crawford was already enrolled at the law school and a member of the football team when he was selected as Michigan's first head coach. The appointment was made at a meeting of the university's athletic directors on October 16, 1891. The directors also confirmed the appointment of Mike Murphy, the trainer at the Detroit Athletic Club, to assist Crawford.

There is some inconsistency in how coaching responsibilities for the 1891 team have been recorded. While Crawford has been identified by several sources as Michigan's first football coach, others indicate that Crawford and Murphy were the joint head coaches in 1891. Still others indicate that Murphy was the one directing the team, or that Murphy relinquished the coaching duties to Crawford midway through the season to focus on his duties as trainer. Murphy was the leading athletic trainer in the United States. He gained his reputation as a trainer at Yale and was hired in 1889 by the Detroit Athletic Club where he trained John Owen and Harry M. Jewett, who became the fastest sprinters in the country.

The Chicago Daily Tribune reported in November 1891 that the Michigan team was "coached systematically" by Murphy, Crawford, Horace Greely Prettyman and James Duffy.

=== Pre-season expectations ===
The 1891 season began with complaints that the student body had become apathetic toward football. On October 3, 1891, The Chronicle-Argonaut reported that the university's Athletic Association was having difficulty securing memberships. Students asked to subscribe had responded, "I guess I'll wait till I see what the foot-ball prospects are." The newspaper urged, "No policy is more fatal to athletic interest than this. ... You must subscribe now and encourage the management if you desire to see good games and see our Eleven go to the front. How can our manager arrange for games if there are no funds backing him? How can he hire a trainer?" Elsewhere in the same issue, interested students were encouraged to submit their names to the team's captain, James Van Inwagen, to fill open place on the line.

On October 24, 1891, The Yellow and Blue, a weekly publication of the university's fraternities, wrote:

"Although it is not our desire to find fault with the football management, we would like to ask one or two pertinent questions in regard to the present situation. Why has no training table been provided? Is an earnest effort being made to secure a coach who is thoroughly acquainted with eastern tactics? No eastern captain would consider his team in condition without several weeks of physical training, including the training table. We have never taken the trouble here to give the system of physical training a fair trial, neither have we won a great game of football. ... The expense of a training table would not be very great, and money could not e expended to better advantage."

The article noted that, with 2,600 students, there should be an ability to raise funds for football, but that there "seems to be a general apathy in regard to foot ball."

=== Ann Arbor High School ===
Game 1: Ann Arbor High School at Michigan

Team	1	2	Total
Ann Arbor High School	0	0	0
• Michigan	38	24	62

- Date: October 10
- Location: Ann Arbor Fairgrounds

On October 10, 1891, Michigan opened its season with a 62–0 victory over Ann Arbor High School at the Ann Arbor Fairgrounds. Michigan scored 12 touchdowns: six by Edward De Pont, four by James Van Inwagen, and one each by William Pearson and Roger Sherman. Van Inwagen kicked seven goals from touchdown. Despite the score, The U. of M. Daily wrote: "The work of the University team was very poor. There was absolutely no team work, as was to be expected since the men had never lined up together before."

Michigan's starting lineup in the game was George Dygert (left end), William Pearson (left tackle), Virgil Tupper (left guard), Berry (center), Charles Thomas (right guard), Wright (right tackle), Roger Sherman (right end), George S. Holden (quarterback), James Van Inwagen (halfback), Frank Loomis (halfback), Edward P. De Pont (fullback).

=== Albion ===
Game 2: Albion at Michigan

Team	1	2	Total
• Albion	10	0	10
Michigan	0	4	4

- Date: October 17
- Location: Ann Arbor Fairgrounds

On October 17, 1891, Michigan lost for the first time to Albion by a 10–4 score. The game was played at the Ann Arbor Fairgrounds in 30-minute halves. Michigan had played Albion seven times from 1886 to 1890 and had won all seven of the previous matches by a combined score of 287-22.

Albion scored first, using a formation that Michigan argued was illegal. The Albion linemen, excepting the ends, locked arms and formed a wedge of protection for the quarterback who ran behind the wedge. The ends, halfbacks, and fullback locked in behind the quarterback, protecting the ball carrier from all sides. Because Albion's line was heavier, Michigan's line had difficulty in stopping Albion's advance. Michigan argued that the use of interlocking of arms violated new rules prohibiting the use of arms to interfere with or obstruct an opponent who was not carrying the ball. Michigan also argued that the quarterback run was illegal as a violation of a rule prohibiting the first man to receive the ball when snapped from advancing the ball. Burnham (quarterback and captain) and Anderson (left halfback) scored touchdowns for Albion in the first half, and Burnham kicked a goal from touchdown. Hayes scored a touchdown for Michigan in the second half.

The Albion team arrived at its local train station at midnight following the game. They were met at the depot by a large crowd, including almost every male student at the college, armed with kazoos, razoos, bells, drums, and fish-horns. The team was taken by carriage to a bonfire on College Hill, where Burnham provided a first-hand account of the game.

Michigan's starting lineup against Albion was Ralph Hayes (right end), George Dygert (right tackle), Charles Thomas (right guard), Berry (center), Virgil Tupper (left guard), William Pearson (left tackle), Williams (left end), Roger Sherman (quarterback), James Van Inwagen (right halfback and captain), Lawrence Grosh (left halfback), and Edward P. De Pont (fullback).

=== Olivet ===
Game 3: Michigan at Olivet

Team	1	2	Total
• Michigan	6	12	18
Olivet	6	0	6

- Date: October 19
- Location: Olivet, MI

On Monday, October 19, 1891, Michigan defeated Olivet by an 18–6 score at Olivet, Michigan. The train carrying the Michigan team left Ann Arbor at 7:40 a.m. and arrived in Olivet at 1:00 p.m. The game began at 2:30 p.m. and was played in 30-minute halves. In the first half, Olivet scored a touchdown, but Powers blocked the kick for goal. Olivet also scored on a safety that resulted from a blocked punt after which the punter, James Duffy, fell on the ball. The score was tied at 6-6 at halftime. Michigan scored three touchdowns against Olivet, two by Lawrence Grosh and one by James Van Inwagen. Duffy kicked all three goals from touchdown. The U. of M. Daily complained that Olivet played "a very unprofessional game" with "considerable slugging" and "dirty work" by Gilbert who was finally disqualified from the game.

Michigan's starting lineup against Olivet was Frank Crawford (right end), Ralph Hayes (right tackle), Charles Thomas (right guard), Edward Wickes (center), Virgil Tupper (left guard), Hiram Powers (left tackle), George Dygert (left end), Roger Sherman (quarterback), James Van Inwagen (right halfback), Lawrence Grosh (left halfback), and James Duffy (fullback).

=== Oberlin ===
Game 4: Oberlin at Michigan

Team	1	2	Total
Oberlin	6	0	6
• Michigan	8	18	26

- Date: October 24
- Location: Ann Arbor Fairgrounds

On October 24, 1891, Michigan defeated Oberlin, 26–6, at the Ann Arbor Fairgrounds. The game began at 3:32 p.m. and was played in 30-minute halves. Oberlin scored first and kicked goal for a 6-0 lead. James Van Inwagen scored around end, but the goal was missed, and Michigan trailed, 6-4. Michigan's second touchdown was scored by quarterback Roger Sherman. After another Michigan back fumbled, an Oberlin player "stooped to pick it up, when Sherman darted beneath him, secured the ball and pushed it over the line." Michigan again missed the kick for goal, but took an 8-6 lead into halftime.

In the second half, Michigan scored 18 points on three touchdowns by left tackle William Pearson and three kicks for goal by George Dygert. The U. of M. Daily praised Oberlin for a clean and gentlemanly game, but criticized two Michigan players (Hiram Powers and Ralph Hayes) for "unnecessary talking in the rush line," opining that such "incessant 'jawing'" was a fault that lessened their effectiveness as players.

Michigan's starting lineup against Oberlin was Hiram Powers (right end), Ralph Hayes (right tackle), Charles Thomas (right guard), Edward Wickes (center), Virgil Tupper (left guard), William Pearson (left tackle), Ralph Stewart McPherran (left end), Roger Sherman (quarterback), George Dygert (right halfback), Williams (left halfback), and James Van Inwagen (fullback and captain).

=== Butler ===
Game 5: Butler at Michigan

Team	1	2	Total
Butler	0	6	6
• Michigan	20	22	42

- Date: October 31
- Location: Ann Arbor Fairgrounds

On October 31, 1891, Michigan defeated Butler, 42–6, at the Ann Arbor Fairgrounds. The game began at 3:22 p.m. and was played in 45-minute halves. Michigan's head coach and left halfback Frank Crawford scored the first touchdown on a 25-yard run around the right end, dodging several Butler players. George Dygert kicked the goal, and Michigan led, 6-0. Left tackle William Pearson scored Michigan's second touchdown, carrying "several Butler men over the line on his shoulders." Dygert missed the goal, and Michigan led, 10-0. Pearson scored the third touchdown, and Dygert again missed the goal. James Van Inwagen scored the fourth touchdown on a left end run with blocking from Crawford. Dygert kicked the goal, and Michigan led, 20-0, at halftime.

In the second half, Pearson and Van Inwagen each scored two more touchdowns. Dygert kicked three goals. One of Butler's players was disqualified for slugging Michigan's quarterback, Roger Sherman. The disqualified player later came onto the field and interfered with Van Inwagen and refused to leave when directed to step back by one of the officials.

Michigan's starting lineup was Ralph Hayes (right end), Harry Mowrey (right tackle), Charles Thomas (right guard), Edward Dana Wickes (center), Berry (left guard), William Pearson (left tackle), Hiram Powers (left end), Roger Sherman (quarterback), James Van Inwagen (right halfback and captain), Frank Crawford (left halfback), and George Dygert (fullback).

One hour prior to the game, Michigan's trainer and assistant football coach, Mike Murphy, oversaw a series of foot races, including contests at 100 yards, 220 yards, and 440 yards.

=== Chicago University Club ===
Game 6: Michigan at Chicago University Club

Team	1	2	Total
Michigan	0	0	0
• Chicago University Club	0	20	20

- Date: November 14
- Location: Chicago

On November 14, 1891, Michigan lost to the Chicago University Club. Although University of Michigan records reflect the score as 10-0, contemporaneous press accounts report the score as 20-0 with the Chicago club scoring four touchdowns and kicking two goals from touchdown. The Detroit Free Press reported: "After a hard fight, during which neither side scored until the second innings, the Chicago University team won the great foot ball match against the University of Michigan by 20 points to nothing. It was a gallant battle, the Michigan men contesting every inch gained by their opponents."

Michigan's lineup against the Chicago University Club was as follows: Hayes and Griffin (right end), Tupper (right tackle), Mowrey (right guard), Jefferis (center), Wickes (left guard), Pearson and Thomas (left tackle), Powers (left end), Roger Sherman (captain and quarterback), James Van Inwagen (right halfback), Rittenger (left halfback), George Dygert (fullback).

=== Cornell (Detroit) ===
The 1891 season included two games against Cornell, played in Detroit on November 21, 1891, and in Chicago on November 28, 1891. In the first game, played at D.A.C. Park, Cornell won by a lopsided score of 58-12. The Detroit Free Press reported that the game was played in the rain and, while the crowd of 2,300 persons was "made up of the best class of people including many ladies, the rain doubtless kept fully as many away who would have been on hand but for the thought that the game would be played in the mist and mud." Michigan's scoring came on touchdowns by Van Inwagen and Rittinger, and two successful goal kicks by Dygert.

Despite the lopsided score of the first Cornell game, the Chicago Daily Tribune reported: "The Cornell-University of Michigan football at D.A.C. Park this afternoon was undoubtedly the finest exhibition of sport ever seen in Detroit. The game was one-sided, but was by no means a walkaway for the victors." Michigan coach, Mike Murphy, also saw some positive signs in Michigan's performance, as the Free Press reported: "Michigan has the greater weight on the rush line and with practice will be far stronger than at present. In fact Murphy is jubilant and thinks that next year he can hustle them all."

Michigan's lineup in the first Cornell game was as follows: Southworth (left end), Pearson and Griffin (left tackle), Tupper (left guard), Jefferis (center), Wickes (right guard), Mowrey (right tackle), Hayes (right end), Sherman (quarterback), Rittinger (left halfback), Van Inwagen (right halfback), and Dygert (fullback).

=== Cleveland Athletic Club ===
On November 26, 1891, Michigan lost a mid-week road game against the Cleveland Athletic Club. The game was played at the Cleveland Athletic Club grounds in Cleveland. The Michigan team arrived in Cleveland at 8:30 a.m., and the game was played at 11:00 a.m. in front of a crowd estimated at 3,000 persons. The game was played on a slippery field described by the Detroit Free Press as follows: "A part of the field was covered by turf, but the greater part had been recently broken and rolled, and was in miserable condition. Besides, there was about an inch or two of soft mud on top of frozen ground, making it very slippery." Cleveland took an 8-0 lead before Michigan's fullback, George Dygert, broke through for a touchdown in the second half. Cleveland won by a final score of 8-4. The Detroit Free Press attributed the loss to a strategic mistake by Michigan's captain: "A fatal mistake was made when Capt. Van Inwagen consented to play thirty-minute halves, instead of forty-five, for the Cleveland team was 'beefy' and did not have good wind. One of the Buckeye players, in particular, was stretched out on the ground nearly half of the time, merely to give his men time to recover their wind."

Michigan's starting lineup against Cleveland was as follows: Edward P. De Pont (left end), Harry Mowrey (left tackle) Virgil Tupper (left guard), Albert W. Jefferis (center), Charles Thomas (right guard), Willard W. Griffin (right tackle), Ralph Hayes (right end), Roger Sherman (quarterback), Charles F. Rittinger (right halfback), James Van Inwagen (captain and left halfback), and George Dygert (fullback).

=== Cornell (Chicago) ===
The final game was played on November 28, 1891, at the South Side Baseball Grounds in Chicago, with Cornell winning 10-0. The New York Times called it "one of the prettiest foot-ball games ever played in the West" and described the wintry conditions of the game: "The field was covered with a six-inch blanket of snow, the air was icy, and frosted feet and hands were among the thousands of spectators ... Three minutes after the game began the ball was covered with ice, but the dazzling white ground soon began to look as though a herd of elephants had been tramping on it."

The Detroit Free Press reported that Michigan gave Cornell "a sharp tussle" and that six of Cornell's points "were scored on a fluke, the ball being fumbled on a pass back." Powers, left end; Mowrey, left tackle; Thomas, left guard; Jeffries, center; Tupper, right guard; Griffin, right tackle;Hayes, right end, Sherman, quarterback; Van Inwagen, left half; Riitenger, right half; Dygert, fullback.

=== Formation of the Western Intercollegiate Athletic Association ===
In April 1892, an athletic league, to include football, baseball, and track, was formed at Chicago between Michigan, the University of Wisconsin, the University of Minnesota, and Northwestern University. "The plans of the league are to have a series of base ball games in the spring, an inter-collegiate field day to be held in Chicago in June and a series of foot-ball games in the fall." The new athletic league, named the Western Intercollegiate Athletic Association, was later renamed the Big Ten Conference.

== Personnel ==
=== Varsity letter winners ===
The following 13 players were awarded varsity letters in football for the 1891 season, according to University of Michigan records.

- George Dygert, Ann Arbor, Michigan - started 5 games at fullback, 2 games at left end, 1 game at right tackle, and 1 game at right halfback. The Detroit Free Press wrote, "George Dygert, the full back, plays the game well from start to finish. He kicks and dodges to perfection and is a reliable man all the way through. Dygert is not a fast runner, but uses his head and invariably makes god gains with the ball."
- Lawrence C. Grosh, Toledo, Ohio - started two games at left halfback. The Detroit Free Press wrote, "Grosh, half-back, is regarded as the best man to send against the line. He runs well with the ball and is a hard man to stop. He has trained faithfully all the season and shows the result of his work in his steady playing in the practice games on the field. His weight is 162 pounds."
- Ralph W. Hayes, Galva, Illinois - started 6 games at right end, 2 games at right tackle
- Albert W. Jefferis, Omaha, Nebraska - started 4 games at center. The Detroit Free Press wrote, "Jeffries [sic] will doubtless play center and will make a good man for the position. He weighs 201 and is strong and very active. He snaps the ball well and will bother his opponents on the line."
- Harry J. Mowrey, Lake Minnetonka, Minnesota - started 2 games at right tackle, 2 games at left tackle, 1 game at right guard. The Detroit Free Press wrote, "Mowery [sic], the other candidate for tackle, weighs 187 pounds and is a strong active player. He tackles well and follows the ball with as much speed as the backs. Murphy is particularly well pleased with this player and considers him a gret find."
- William W. Pearson, Springfield, Illinois - started 6 games at left tackle. The Detroit Free Press wrote, "Pearson, left tackle, is the best rusher the college has seen for many years. He weighs 192 pounds and is very powerful, often carrying two or three men on his back in some of his rushes. When given the ball Pearson usually makes a gain. He plays third base on the nine and is a good example of an all-around athlete. He is quick on his feet and a hard man to stop."
- Hiram Powers, Buffalo, New York - started 4 games at left end, 1 game at right end, 1 game at left tackle. The Detroit Free Press wrote, "Powers has played a good game at right end thus far and seems sure of his position. He follows the ball closely, tackles well and plays a hard game for his weight, which is 145 pounds."
- Charles Frederick Rittinger - started 3 games at left halfback, 1 game at right halfback. The Detroit Free Press wrote, "Possibly the greatest find of the season is Rittenger [sic], another of Murphy's discoveries. He is trying for half back, and seems sure of the place on the eleven. He weighs 173 pounds and excels in running the ball and bucking the rush line." Rittinger was a school principal in Okemos, Michigan, before enrolling at Michigan's Law Department in 1881. He was injured during an 1891 game against Cornell. Several months later, "hemorrhages set in, and the injury proved to be a vital one." He died August 21, 1893, at Cass City, Michigan, at age 24. The Speculum wrote: "In many respects Mr. Rittinger was a superior character, and gave promise of becoming a star among men. In intellectual vigor he ranked high. His generosity was unbounded. The qualities with this impetuosity and fiery zeal enabled him to subdue difficulties and laugh at all possibilities."
- Roger Sherman, Chicago, Illinois - started 8 games at quarterback, 1 game at right end. The Detroit Free Press wrote, "Roger Sherman, at quarter, is as good a man for the position as the university has seen for many years. Although the lightest man on the eleven he plays a strong game and finishes well. He tackles cleverly and is usually sure of his man. His passing is accurate and he falls on the ball better than any man on the team."
- Charles L. Thomas, Omaha, Nebraska - started 6 games at right guard, 1 game at left guard, and 1 game at left tackle. The Detroit Free Press wrote, "Thomas has also been playing tackle and has played his position well, although not up to his standard, as he is well built, weighs 183, and is a good man for the line."
- Virgil Tupper, Bay City, Michigan - started 6 games at left guard, 1 game at right guard, 1 game at right tackle. The Detroit Free Press wrote, "Tupper will play right guard ... Tupper weighs 194 pounds and is very owerful. He runs well and follows the ball closely."
- James Van Inwagen - started 8 games at halfback, 1 game at fullback. The Detroit Free Press wrote, "Van Inwagen, the captain, received his foot ball education at Exeter, N.H., ... He weighs 160 pounds, is a speedy runner (the fastest man on the eleven) and plays a brilliant, showy game. His opponents give him credit for being the hardest man to tackle on the team."
- Edward Dana Wickes, Helena, Montana - started 3 games at center, 1 game at left guard, 1 game at right guard. The Detroit Free Press wrote, "Wickes, left guard, weighs 186 pounds and is playing a good game. He is very aggressive and keeps his man moving most of the time."

=== Substitutes ===
The following players are recorded as substitutes for the 1891 football team, according to University of Michigan records.

- Berry - substitute, Howard, Ohio
- Frank Crawford, Colebrook, New Hampshire - started 1 game at right end, 1 game at left halfback. The Detroit Free Press wrote, "Crawford, left end, weighs 146 pounds, but plays a hard game from the start. He is a good runner and tackler, and is very slippery. He is quick to take advantage of an opening and makes some very good runs."
- Edward Paul De Pont, Ann Arbor, Michigan - started 2 games at fullback.
- James Duffy, Bay City, Michigan - started 1 game at fullback. The Detroit Free Press wrote, "Duffy is too well known to need further introduction to the average reader who follows athletics on the field or track. He is a brilliant runner, a sure tackler and altogether a very desirable half-back. His kicking is his specialty, however, and in this line he has never been excelled."
- Willard Wilmer Griffin, Wenona, Illinois - substitute guard.
- Charles Wilson Southworth, Forestville, New York - substitute end.

=== Coaching staff ===
- Head coach: Frank Crawford
- Trainer: Mike Murphy
- Manager: Royal T. Farrand
