= 1891 Iowa College Pioneers football team =

American college football season

1891 Iowa College Pioneers football
- Conference: Independent
- Record: 1–1–1
- Head coach: Theron Lyman (1st season)

1891 Midwestern college football independents records
	Conf.			Overall
Team	W	L	T	W		L		T
Ohio Wesleyan		–		4	–	0	–	0
Kansas		–		7	–	0	–	1
Illinois		–		5	–	1	–	0
Missouri		–		3	–	1	–	0
Lake Forest		–		6	–	2	–	0
Washington University		–		4	–	1	–	1
Minnesota		–		3	–	1	–	1
Wisconsin		–		3	–	1	–	1
Cincinnati		–		4	–	2	–	1
Iowa		–		3	–	2	–	0
Doane		–		2	–	2	–	0
Iowa College		–		1	–	1	–	1
Miami (OH)		–		1	–	1	–	0
Nebraska		–		2	–	2	–	0
Northwestern		–		2	–	2	–	3
Michigan		–		4	–	5	–	0
Ohio State		–		2	–	3	–	0
Case		–		1	–	2	–	0
Buchtel		–		1	–	3	–	0
Washburn		–		1	–	5	–	0
Michigan State Normal		–		0	–	2	–	0

The 1891 Iowa College Pioneers football team was an American football team that represented Iowa College (later renamed Grinnell College) during the 1891 college football season. In its first season under head coach Theron Lyman, the team compiled a 1–1–1 record.

== Schedule ==
Date	Opponent	Site	Result	Source
October 31	Minnesota	Grinnell, IA	T 12–12	
November 9	Iowa	Grinnell, IA	W 6–4	
November 14	Minnesota	Minneapolis, MN	L 22–14	
