= Haight Street Grounds =

American sports stadium

- Interactive map of Haight Street Grounds
- Location: near Golden Gate Park; San Francisco, California
- Coordinates: 37°46′3.17″N 122°27′5.46″W
- Surface: Natural grass
- Record attendance: 22,000 (Nov. 25, 1889)

Construction
- Opened: March/April 1887
- Closed: March 1895
- Demolished: 1895 (131 years ago)

Tenants
- California League (professional baseball); Big Game (college football)

Haight Street Grounds was one of San Francisco's earliest baseball parks; it was also used for college football. It opened in 1887 and was demolished in 1895.

== History ==
Haight Street Grounds was built for use by the California League and was located on the east side of Golden Gate Park, bounded by Stanyan, Waller, Shrader, and Frederick streets, across Stanyan from the eventual Kezar Stadium complex. The opening game on April 3, 1887, (Note: A newspaper article in 1895 stated an opening date of March 24, 1887.) between the Haverlys and the Pioneers, was attended by 10,000 fans. In 1893, the California League folded, and, in March 1895, plans were announced to use the ballpark land for residential development. The final baseball game at the grounds was played on March 10, 1895.

While built for baseball, Haight Street Grounds is noteworthy for being the birthplace of the Big Game, a now annual college football game between Stanford and California. It was the site of the first four Big Games, which were played on March 19, 1892; December 17, 1892; November 28, 1893; and November 29, 1894.
