= 1891 Case football team =

American college football season

1891 Case football
- Conference: Independent
- Record: 1–2
- Head coach: Al Newell (1st season)

1891 Midwestern college football independents records
	Conf.			Overall
Team	W	L	T	W		L		T
Ohio Wesleyan		–		4	–	0	–	0
Kansas		–		7	–	0	–	1
Illinois		–		5	–	1	–	0
Missouri		–		3	–	1	–	0
Lake Forest		–		6	–	2	–	0
Washington University		–		4	–	1	–	1
Minnesota		–		3	–	1	–	1
Wisconsin		–		3	–	1	–	1
Cincinnati		–		4	–	2	–	1
Iowa		–		3	–	2	–	0
Doane		–		2	–	2	–	0
Iowa College		–		1	–	1	–	1
Miami (OH)		–		1	–	1	–	0
Nebraska		–		2	–	2	–	0
Northwestern		–		2	–	2	–	3
Michigan		–		4	–	5	–	0
Ohio State		–		2	–	3	–	0
Case		–		1	–	2	–	0
Buchtel		–		1	–	3	–	0
Washburn		–		1	–	5	–	0
Michigan State Normal		–		0	–	2	–	0

The 1891 Case football team was an American football team that represented the Case School of Applied Science in Cleveland, Ohio, now a part of Case Western Reserve University. The season was the team's first. Playing as an independent during the 1891 college football season, the team compiled a 1–2 record.

== Schedule ==
Date	Opponent	Site	Result	Attendance
November 7	Buchtel	Akron, OH	W 42–0	
November 14	at Oberlin	Oberlin, OH	L 0–10	
December 20	Western Reserve	YMCA Park; Cleveland, OH	L 0–22	1,000
