= 1891 Ohio State Buckeyes football team =

American college football season

1891 Ohio State Buckeyes football
- Conference: Independent
- Record: 2–3
- Head coach: Alexander S. Lilley (2nd season)
- Captains: Richard T. Ellis; Frank Haas; George Pearce
- Home stadium: Recreation Park

1891 Midwestern college football independents records
	Conf.			Overall
Team	W	L	T	W		L		T
Ohio Wesleyan		–		4	–	0	–	0
Kansas		–		7	–	0	–	1
Illinois		–		5	–	1	–	0
Missouri		–		3	–	1	–	0
Lake Forest		–		6	–	2	–	0
Washington University		–		4	–	1	–	1
Minnesota		–		3	–	1	–	1
Wisconsin		–		3	–	1	–	1
Cincinnati		–		4	–	2	–	1
Iowa		–		3	–	2	–	0
Doane		–		2	–	2	–	0
Iowa College		–		1	–	1	–	1
Miami (OH)		–		1	–	1	–	0
Nebraska		–		2	–	2	–	0
Northwestern		–		2	–	2	–	3
Michigan		–		4	–	5	–	0
Ohio State		–		2	–	3	–	0
Case		–		1	–	2	–	0
Buchtel		–		1	–	3	–	0
Washburn		–		1	–	5	–	0
Michigan State Normal		–		0	–	2	–	0

The 1891 Ohio State Buckeyes football team represented Ohio State University in the 1891 college football season. They played all their home games at Recreation Park and were coached by Alexander S. Lilley. The Buckeyes finished the season with a 2–3 record.

This season was very uneven for Ohio State. Richard T. Ellis was elected captain at the beginning of the season, but he broke his leg during the game against Adelbert College (the undergraduate college of Western Reserve University). Frank Haas served as captain during the Kenyon game. Baseball captain George Pearce took over the football team for the Denison game on Thanksgiving. The Denison game gave Ohio State its first victory since their first-ever game on May 3, 1890.

Among the members of the Ohio State team in 1891 was future Spink Award-winning sportswriter Hugh Fullerton.

== Schedule ==
1891 Ohio Intercollegiate Athletic Association conference standings.

Date	Opponent	Site	Result
October 17	at Otterbein	Westerville, OH	L 6–42
November 11	Western Reserve	Recreation Park; Columbus, OH	L 6–50
November 14	at Kenyon	Gambier, OH	L 0–26
November 26	Denison	Recreation Park; Columbus, OH	W 8–4
December 5	at Buchtel	Akron, OH	W 4–0

== Players ==
Right end...Clarence W Withoft (1873-1933), Right tackle...Harrison Hutchinson Richardson (1869-1960), Right guard...Paul Martyn Lincoln (1870-1944), Center... Charles S Powell, Left guard...James Stewart Hine (1866-1930), Left tackle...Louis C Ernst (1871-1949), Left end...Raymond Edward Leo Krumm (1873-1948), Quarterback... George Domer Pearce (1871-1925), Right halfback...Arthur H Kennedy, Left halfback...Austin Peter Gillen (1871-1927), Fullback... G Smith.

Substitutes...William Nicholas Zurfluh (1870-1964), Mortimer William Lawrence (1873-1909), Renick W. Dunlap (1872-1945), Frederick Douglas Patterson (1871-1932), J.J. Walsh and Frank Haas.

References—1892 Makio (Ohio State yearbook).
