= 1891 Northwestern Purple football team =

American college football season

1891 Northwestern Purple football
- Conference: Independent
- Record: 2–2–3
- Head coach: Knowlton Ames (1st season)
- Captain: Ransom Kennicott

1891 Midwestern college football independents records
| | Conf. | | | Overall |
| Team | W | L | T | W | | L | | T |
|---|---|---|---|---|---|---|---|---|
| Ohio Wesleyan | | – | | 4 | – | 0 | – | 0 |
| Kansas | | – | | 7 | – | 0 | – | 1 |
| Illinois | | – | | 5 | – | 1 | – | 0 |
| Missouri | | – | | 3 | – | 1 | – | 0 |
| Lake Forest | | – | | 6 | – | 2 | – | 0 |
| Washington University | | – | | 4 | – | 1 | – | 1 |
| Minnesota | | – | | 3 | – | 1 | – | 1 |
| Wisconsin | | – | | 3 | – | 1 | – | 1 |
| Cincinnati | | – | | 4 | – | 2 | – | 1 |
| Iowa | | – | | 3 | – | 2 | – | 0 |
| Doane | | – | | 2 | – | 2 | – | 0 |
| Iowa College | | – | | 1 | – | 1 | – | 1 |
| Miami (OH) | | – | | 1 | – | 1 | – | 0 |
| Nebraska | | – | | 2 | – | 2 | – | 0 |
| Northwestern | | – | | 2 | – | 2 | – | 3 |
| Michigan | | – | | 4 | – | 5 | – | 0 |
| Ohio State | | – | | 2 | – | 3 | – | 0 |
| Case | | – | | 1 | – | 2 | – | 0 |
| Buchtel | | – | | 1 | – | 3 | – | 0 |
| Washburn | | – | | 1 | – | 5 | – | 0 |
| Michigan State Normal | | – | | 0 | – | 2 | – | 0 |

The 1891 Northwestern Purple football team was an American football team that represented Northwestern University during the 1891 college football season. The team compiled a 2–2–3 record and was outscored by its opponents by a combined total of 72 to 42.

== Schedule ==
| Date | Opponent | Site | Result | Attendance | Source |
|---|---|---|---|---|---|
| September 30 | Evanston High School | Evanston, IL | W 8–0 | | |
| October 17 | at Lake Forest | Chicago, IL | T 0–0 | | |
| October 31 | vs. Wisconsin | Athletic Park; Milwaukee, WI | T 0–0 | | |
| November 5 | Chicago YMCA | Evanston, IL | W 22–0 | | |
| November 14 | at Beloit | Beloit, WI | T 12–12 | | |
| November 21 | at Lake Forest | Lake Forest, IL | L 20–0 | | |
| November 26 | vs. Wisconsin | Athletic Park; Milwaukee, WI | L 0–40 | | |
