= 1891 Cincinnati football team =

American college football season

1891 Cincinnati football
- Conference: Independent
- Record: 4–2–1
- Head coach: None
- Captain: Clyde Johnson
- Home stadium: East End Athletic Grounds

1891 Midwestern college football independents records
	Conf.			Overall
Team	W	L	T	W		L		T
Ohio Wesleyan		–		4	–	0	–	0
Kansas		–		7	–	0	–	1
Illinois		–		5	–	1	–	0
Missouri		–		3	–	1	–	0
Lake Forest		–		6	–	2	–	0
Washington University		–		4	–	1	–	1
Minnesota		–		3	–	1	–	1
Wisconsin		–		3	–	1	–	1
Cincinnati		–		4	–	2	–	1
Iowa		–		3	–	2	–	0
Doane		–		2	–	2	–	0
Iowa College		–		1	–	1	–	1
Miami (OH)		–		1	–	1	–	0
Nebraska		–		2	–	2	–	0
Northwestern		–		2	–	2	–	3
Michigan		–		4	–	5	–	0
Ohio State		–		2	–	3	–	0
Case		–		1	–	2	–	0
Buchtel		–		1	–	3	–	0
Washburn		–		1	–	5	–	0
Michigan State Normal		–		0	–	2	–	0

The 1891 Cincinnati football team was an American football team that represented the University of Cincinnati as an independent during the 1891 college football season. The team compiled a 4–2–1 record. Clyde Johnson was the team captain. The team had no head coach.

== Schedule ==
Date	Time	Opponent	Site	Result	Source
		Woodward High School	Cincinnati, OH	W 22–0	
October 16		Hughes High School	Gymnasium Athletic Grounds; Cincinnati, OH	W 33–0	
October 23		Franklin (IN)	East End Athletic Grounds; Cincinnati, OH	W 38–0	
October 24	3:57 p.m.	at Cincinnati Gymnasium and Athletic Club	Gymnasium Athletic Grounds; Cincinnati, OH	T 0–0	
October 31	3:00 p.m.	at Dayton YMCA	Athletic park grounds; Dayton, OH	L 8–12	
November 21	2:30 p.m.	at Butler	Fair grounds; Indianapolis, IN	L 10–34	
November 26		Cincinnati Gymnasium and Athletic Club	East End Athletic Grounds; Cincinnati, OH	W 18–0	
