= 1891 Buchtel football team =

American college football season

1891 Buchtel football
- Conference: Independent
- Record: 1–3
- Head coach: None
- Captain: Charles Weeks

1891 Midwestern college football independents records
	Conf.			Overall
Team	W	L	T	W		L		T
Ohio Wesleyan		–		4	–	0	–	0
Kansas		–		7	–	0	–	1
Illinois		–		5	–	1	–	0
Missouri		–		3	–	1	–	0
Lake Forest		–		6	–	2	–	0
Washington University		–		4	–	1	–	1
Minnesota		–		3	–	1	–	1
Wisconsin		–		3	–	1	–	1
Cincinnati		–		4	–	2	–	1
Iowa		–		3	–	2	–	0
Doane		–		2	–	2	–	0
Iowa College		–		1	–	1	–	1
Miami (OH)		–		1	–	1	–	0
Nebraska		–		2	–	2	–	0
Northwestern		–		2	–	2	–	3
Michigan		–		4	–	5	–	0
Ohio State		–		2	–	3	–	0
Case		–		1	–	2	–	0
Buchtel		–		1	–	3	–	0
Washburn		–		1	–	5	–	0
Michigan State Normal		–		0	–	2	–	0

The 1891 Buchtel football team represented Buchtel College in the 1891 college football season. This season was the team's first. They did not have a coach and were led by captain Charles Weeks. They were outscored by their opponents 22–94 and finished with a record 1–3.

1891 Ohio Intercollegiate Athletic Association conference standings.

== Schedule ==
Date	Opponent	Site	Result
	at Western Reserve	Hudson, OH	W 22–6
	Kenyon	Akron, OH	L 0–42
	at Case	Cleveland, OH	L 0–42
December 5	Ohio State	Akron, OH	L 0–4
