= 1891 Nebraska football team =

American college football season

1891 Nebraska football
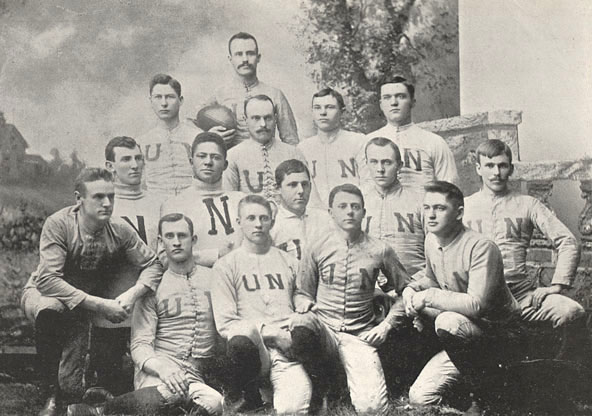

Nebraska state champion
- Conference: Independent
- Record: 2–2
- Head coach: Theron Lyman (1st season)
- Home stadium: Lincoln Park

1891 Midwestern college football independents records
	Conf.			Overall
Team	W	L	T	W		L		T
Ohio Wesleyan		–		4	–	0	–	0
Kansas		–		7	–	0	–	1
Illinois		–		5	–	1	–	0
Missouri		–		3	–	1	–	0
Lake Forest		–		6	–	2	–	0
Washington University		–		4	–	1	–	1
Minnesota		–		3	–	1	–	1
Wisconsin		–		3	–	1	–	1
Cincinnati		–		4	–	2	–	1
Iowa		–		3	–	2	–	0
Doane		–		2	–	2	–	0
Iowa College		–		1	–	1	–	1
Miami (OH)		–		1	–	1	–	0
Nebraska		–		2	–	2	–	0
Northwestern		–		2	–	2	–	3
Michigan		–		4	–	5	–	0
Ohio State		–		2	–	3	–	0
Case		–		1	–	2	–	0
Buchtel		–		1	–	3	–	0
Washburn		–		1	–	5	–	0
Michigan State Normal		–		0	–	2	–	0

The 1891 Nebraska football team represented the University of Nebraska in the 1891 college football season. The team had no head coach, but Theron Lyman led NU in preparation for its game against Iowa. The team played its single home game at Lincoln Park, in Lincoln, Nebraska.

Nebraska fielded its second football team in 1891. Although the university did not provide an official head coach, Iowa College coach Theron Lyman assisted Nebraska in preparation for its November 26 game against Iowa, in order to increase the competitiveness of NU's young program against the veteran Hawkeyes. However, Lyman likely did not even attend his single game as "head coach". Nebraska's second victory over Doane gave the program a second straight unofficial Nebraska state championship.

== Schedule ==
Date	Time	Opponent	Site	Result	Attendance	Source
October 31	3:30 p.m.	Doane	Lincoln Park; Lincoln, NE	W 28–4	>800	
November 14		at Doane	Crete, NE	L 12–14		
November 26	3:00 p.m.	vs. Iowa	baseball ballpark; Omaha, NE (rivalry)	L 0–22		
December 5		at Doane	Crete, NE	W 32–0		

== Coaching staff ==
Coach	Position	First year	Alma mater
Theron Lyman	Head coach (unofficial)	1891	Yale
Jack Best	Trainer	1890	Nebraska

== Roster ==
- Anderson, Arthur C
- Barkely, James QB
- Chandler, Charles T
- Church, R.D. HB
- Flippin, George HB
- Mockett, Ebenezer HB^{1}
- Hyde, Frederick G
- Johnston, James HB
- Jones, Albin T
- Mosher, Bradley FB
- Nusz, Chauncy FB
- Pace, Eugene QB
- Porterfield, James G
- Skiles, Charles E
- Stockton, William E
- White, Jacob E
- Wynegar T
- Yont, Jesse G

^{1} Withdrew from classes after first game

== Offensive Starters ==
Offensive starters

E Charles Skiles	G / T / C / T / G; Jesse Yont / Albin Jones / Arthur Anderson / Charles Chandler / James Porterfield	E Frederick Hyde

QB
Eugene Pace

HB	FB	HB
James Johnston	Jacob White	George Flippin

|}

== Game summaries ==
=== Doane (October) ===
Doane at Nebraska

Team	1	2	Total
Doane	4	0	4
• Nebraska	16	12	28

- Date: October 31
- Location: Lincoln Park, Lincoln, NE

Nebraska had planned a rematch with Doane during the 1890 season, which was never played, but led to the teams facing each other three times in 1891.

Although Doane scored the first points of the game (the first ever scored against Nebraska), Nebraska posted 16 unanswered points before halftime. The game was reportedly very physical, with several players suffering serious injuries, to the point that the Doane squad considered calling off the rest of the game, though they eventually agreed to a shortened 15-minute second half. Nebraska scored 12 more points to win 28–4.

=== At Doane (November) ===
Nebraska at Doane

Team	1	2	Total
Nebraska	6	6	12
• Doane	4	10	14

- Date: November 14
- Location: Crete, NE

Nebraska, hoping for more playing time before facing the established Iowa Hawkeyes, scheduled a rematch with Doane. Team captain Ebenezer Mockett withdrew from the university prior to the game, leaving the team without a head coach or captain. Doane reportedly prepared at length for the game, while several Nebraska players remained out with injuries.

Nebraska scored the first points off an early Doane fumble to go ahead 6–0. Doane pulled ahead 10–6 at the beginning of the second half, NU's first-ever deficit. Although the team answered with six points to regain the lead, Doane responded to hand Nebraska the first loss in program history.

=== Iowa ===
Iowa vs. Nebraska

Team	1	2	Total
• Iowa	14	8	22
Nebraska	0	0	0

- Date: November 26
- Location: Omaha, NE

Although Nebraska was supported by temporary head coach Theron Lyman, the team's lack of experience and substandard equipment made NU heavy underdogs against the Hawkeyes. Despite having played just one more season than NU, Iowa used playing styles and strategies Nebraska had never seen before, such as pre-play signal calling by the quarterback. Despite a strong defensive effort by Nebraska, Iowa pulled away in the second half to win 22–0, Nebraska's first shutout loss.

=== At Doane (December) ===
Nebraska at Doane

Team	1	2	Total
• Nebraska	22	10	32
Doane	0	0	0

- Date: December 5
- Location: Crete, NE

After splitting two games, Nebraska and Doane arranged a tie-breaking third game to serve as an unofficial state championship game.

Despite losing a physical game to Iowa just one week prior, visiting Nebraska opened the first half with 22 unanswered points. NU halfbacks George Flippin, the first African American to play football for Nebraska, and James Johnston each scored three touchdowns. NU added ten points in the second half en route to a 32–0 victory and the unofficial Nebraska state championship for the second consecutive year.
