= Minnesota–Wisconsin football rivalry =

American college football rivalry

- Minnesota Golden Gophers Wisconsin Badgers
- Sport: American football
- First meeting: November 15, 1890; Minnesota, 63–0
- Latest meeting: November 29, 2025; Minnesota, 17–7
- Next meeting: November 28, 2026
- Trophy: Paul Bunyan's Axe (current); Slab of Bacon (former)

Statistics
- Total meetings: 135
- All-time series: Minnesota leads, 64–63–8 (.504)
- Trophy series: Wisconsin leads, 46–29–3 (.609)
- Largest victory: Minnesota, 63–0 (1890)
- Longest win streak: Wisconsin, 14 (2004–2017)
- Current win streak: Minnesota, 2 (2024–present)

Locations of Minnesota and Wisconsin

The Minnesota–Wisconsin football rivalry is an American college football rivalry between the Minnesota Golden Gophers and Wisconsin Badgers. It is the most-played rivalry in the NCAA Division I Football Bowl Subdivision, with 135 meetings between the two teams. It is also the longest continuously played rivalry in Division I FBS, with an uninterrupted streak of 119 games through the 2025 season. The winner of the game receives Paul Bunyan's Axe, a tradition that started in 1948 after the first trophy, the Slab of Bacon, disappeared after the 1943 game when the Badgers were supposed to turn it over to the Golden Gophers. Minnesota and Wisconsin first played in 1890 and have met every year since, except for 1906. Minnesota leads the series 64–63–8 through 2025. Wisconsin took the series lead for the first time after defeating Minnesota 31–0 in the 2017 game; Minnesota had led the overall series since 1902, at times by as many as 20 games. Like many rivalry games, the game is played during the final week of the college football season.

The rivalry game is sometimes known as the Border Battle.

== History ==
The rivalry was first played in 1890 on Minnesota's campus, in Minneapolis, resulting in a 63–0 Minnesota victory. Theron Lyman led Wisconsin to its first win over Minnesota in 1894. The game became a conference rivalry with the creation of the Western Conference (later the Big Ten Conference) in 1896. In 1906, President Theodore Roosevelt suspended college football rivalry games for safety concerns, due to player injuries and fatalities on the field. It is the single year the two teams did not play each other. Subsequently, it is now the longest uninterrupted rivalry in FBS Division 1 college football. The game has never been played in any city besides Minneapolis, and Madison, Wisconsin.

From 1933 to 1982, it was traditionally the final game of the regular season for both schools. It has resumed being a season finale as of 2014, following the Big Ten's new divisional alignment and schedule for the final weekend of conference play.

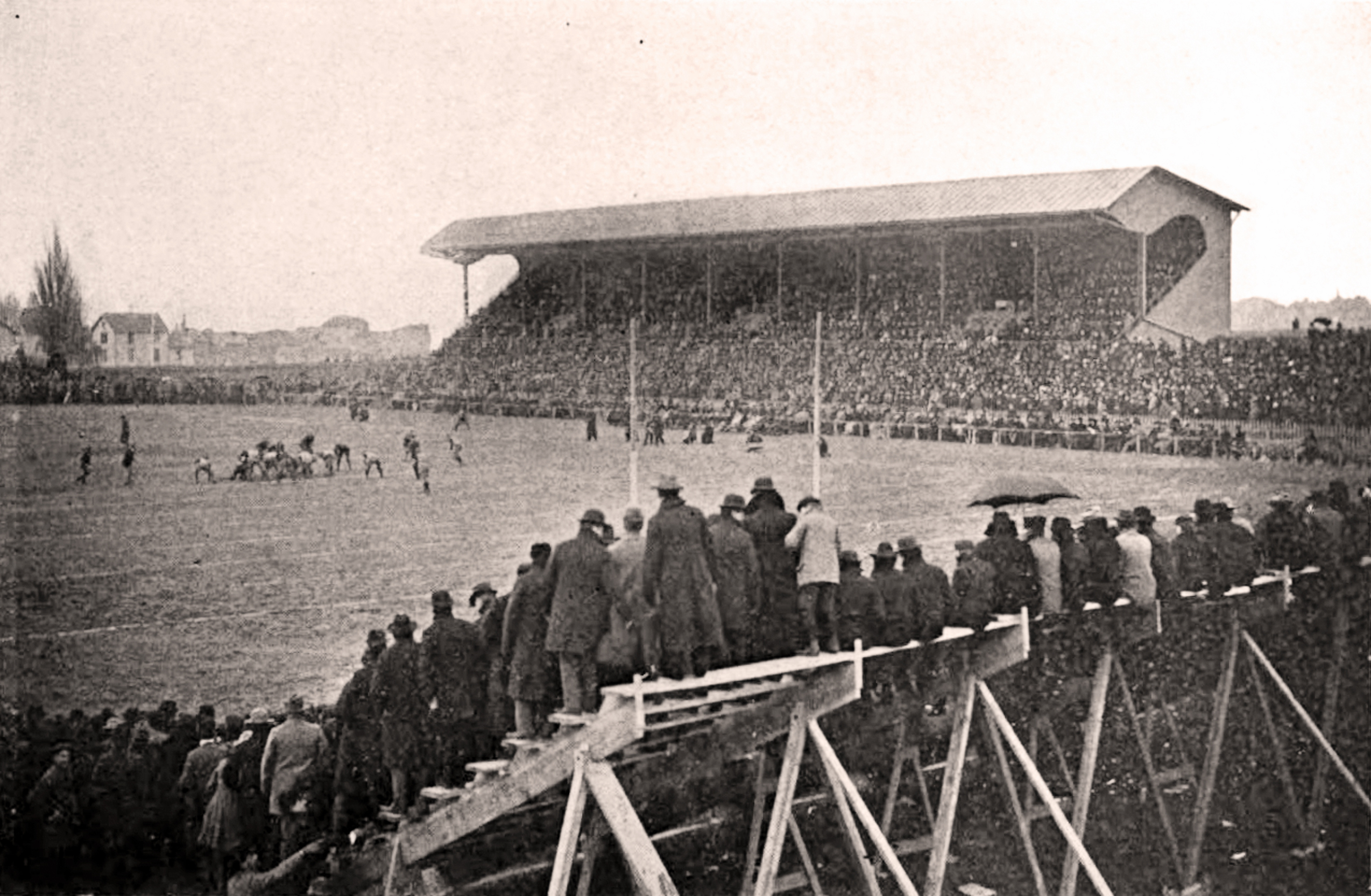
Minnesota vs. Wisconsin, Randall Field, 1903 or earlier

The 2014 and 2019 games decided the Big Ten West champion; Wisconsin defeated Minnesota 34–24 to go to the 2014 Big Ten Football Championship Game against Ohio State. In 2019, Wisconsin defeated Minnesota 38–17 to go to the 2019 Big Ten Football Championship Game against Ohio State. The last time the rivalry determined a Big Ten Conference champion was in 1962 when #3 Wisconsin defeated #5 Minnesota for a berth to the 1963 Rose Bowl.

Wisconsin won 14 straight meetings against Minnesota, from 2004 to 2017, before the Gophers beat the Badgers in their 2018 matchup. It ended the longest losing streak for either team in the history of the rivalry. The rivalry was declared 'protected' by the Big Ten in 2023, after the Big Ten West was disbanded as a result of the latest conference expansion. This ensures the Border Battle will continue to be played annually.

== Trophies ==
=== Slab of Bacon ===
The rivalry's first trophy was the "Slab of Bacon", in use from 1930 to 1943. Created by R. B. Fouch of Minneapolis, it is a piece of black walnut wood with a football at the center bearing a letter that becomes "M" or "W" depending on which way the trophy is hung. The word "BACON" is carved at both ends, implying that the winner has "brought home the bacon". The trophy's tenure ended when Minnesota's 1943 victory in Minnesota led to the fans rushing the field. Wisconsin student Peg Watrous was to bring the trophy to a Minnesota representative after the game, but the representative could not find her in the commotion, and subsequently lost track of the "bacon". Reportedly, the trophy was sent to Minnesota's locker room, but coach George Hauser refused it, suggesting such traditions be held off until after World War II. It was subsequently lost for many years, and so a new trophy, "Paul Bunyan's Axe", was introduced in 1948.

The "Slab of Bacon" trophy remained lost for over 50 years. In 1992, Wisconsin coach Barry Alvarez joked that "we took home the bacon, and kept it." In 1994, Wisconsin intern Will Roleson found it in a storage closet at Camp Randall Stadium. It had evidently been maintained for some time, as game scores through 1970 were painted on the back. It is now displayed at the Camp Randall Stadium football offices.

Trophy record (1930-1943): Minnesota, 11–3 (.786)

=== Paul Bunyan's Axe ===
Original 1948 Paul Bunyan's Axe

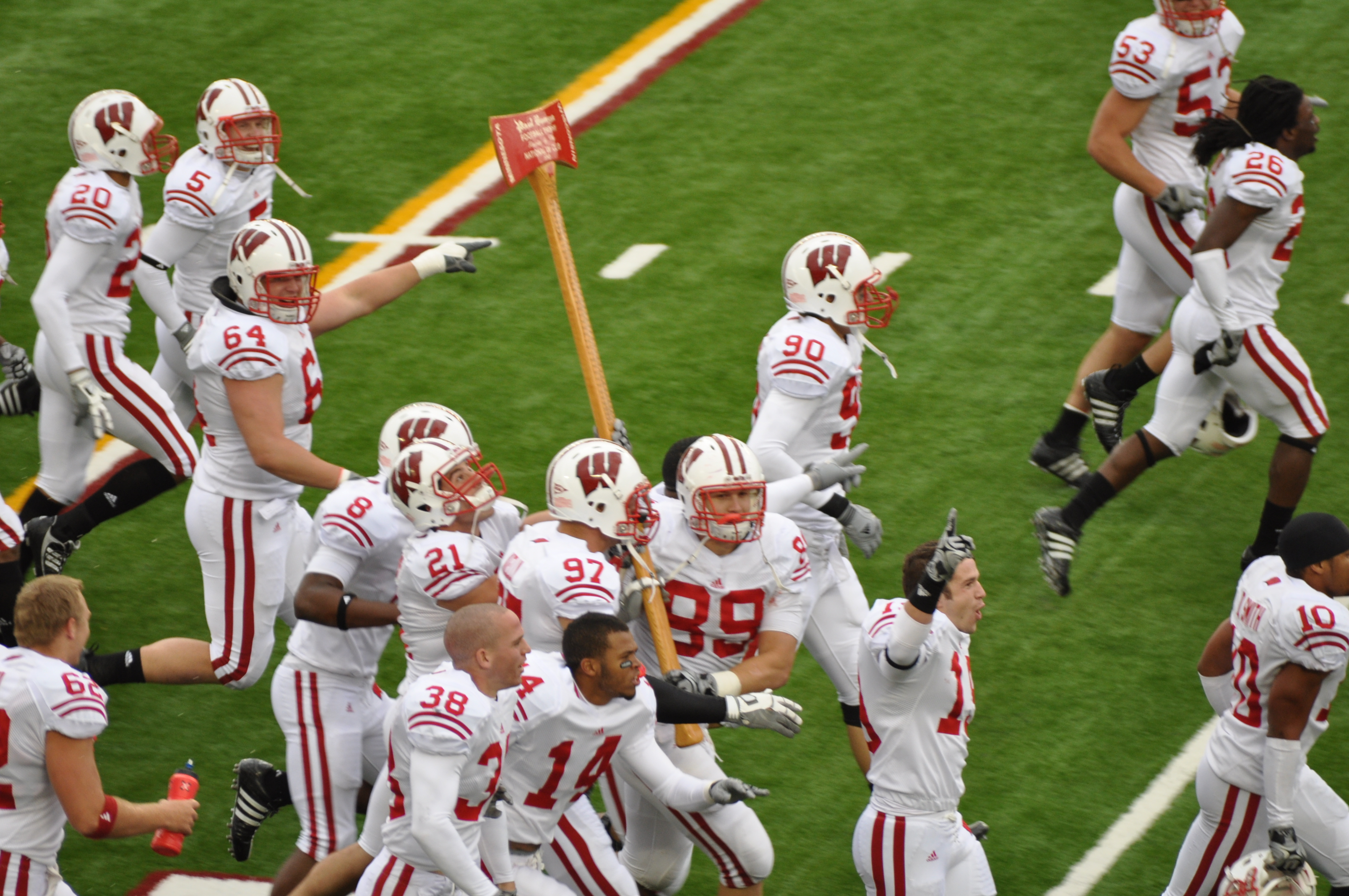
Badgers celebrating their win by carrying Paul Bunyan's Axe around Minnesota's TCF Bank Stadium after the 2009 game

The Paul Bunyan Axe was created by the Wisconsin letterwinners' organization (the National W Club) and was instituted as the trophy in the series in 1948. The scores of each game are recorded on the axe's handle, which is 6 feet long. A new axe was created in 2000. The original axe was donated to the College Football Hall of Fame in 2003.

Until 2014, when the game ended, if the team holding the trophy won, they would run to their own sideline, take the axe and carry it around the field and "chop down" one or both goal posts. If the team not holding the axe won, they were allowed to run to their opponents' sideline and "steal" the axe. The tradition was changed in 2014, with the Axe now kept off the field until the game is over. This change was in response to a near skirmish in 2013 in which the Wisconsin Badgers players interrupted the Minnesota players tradition of singing "Hail Minnesota" in front of the student section following the game while attempting to ceremonially chop down the goal post. The usual tradition was restored in 2015, with Wisconsin winning again 31–21.

Trophy record: Wisconsin, 46–29–3 (.609) through 2025

== Accomplishments by the two rivals ==
Team	Minnesota	Wisconsin
Claimed national titles	7	0
Bowl appearances	25	35
Postseason bowl record	13–12	19-16
BCS bowl appearances	0	5
CFP appearances	0	0
NY6 bowl appearances	0	3
Rose Bowl appearances	2	10
Rose Bowl wins	1	3
Division titles	0	5
Conference titles	20 (2 IAAN)	14
Consensus All-Americans	28	32
Heisman Trophies	1	2
All-time program record	733–543–44	743–518–53
All-time win percentage	.572	.584

== Game results ==
Minnesota victories	Wisconsin victories	Tie games

No.	Date	Location	Winner	Score
1	November 15, 1890	Minneapolis, MN	Minnesota	63–0
2	October 24, 1891	Minneapolis, MN	Minnesota	26–12
3	October 29, 1892	Madison, WI	Minnesota	32–4
4	November 16, 1893	Minneapolis, MN	Minnesota	40–0
5	November 17, 1894	Madison, WI	Wisconsin	6–0
6	November 16, 1895	Minneapolis, MN	Minnesota	14–10
7	November 21, 1896	Madison, WI	Wisconsin	6–0
8	October 30, 1897	Minneapolis, MN	Wisconsin	39–0
9	October 29, 1898	Madison, WI	Wisconsin	29–0
10	November 18, 1899	Minneapolis, MN	Wisconsin	19–0
11	November 3, 1900	Minneapolis, MN	Minnesota	6–5
12	November 16, 1901	Madison, WI	Wisconsin	18–0
13	November 15, 1902	Minneapolis, MN	Minnesota	11–0
14	November 26, 1903	Madison, WI	Minnesota	17–0
15	November 12, 1904	Minneapolis, MN	Minnesota	28–0
16	November 4, 1905	Minneapolis, MN	Wisconsin	16–12
17	November 23, 1907	Madison, WI	Tie	17–17
18	November 7, 1908	Minneapolis, MN	Wisconsin	5–0
19	November 13, 1909	Madison, WI	Minnesota	34–6
20	November 12, 1910	Minneapolis, MN	Minnesota	28–0
21	November 18, 1911	Madison, WI	Tie	6–6
22	November 16, 1912	Minneapolis, MN	Wisconsin	14–0
23	November 1, 1913	Madison, WI	Minnesota	21–3
24	November 14, 1914	Minneapolis, MN	Minnesota	14–3
25	November 20, 1915	Madison, WI	Minnesota	20–3
26	November 18, 1916	Minneapolis, MN	Minnesota	54–0
27	November 3, 1917	Madison, WI	Wisconsin	10–7
28	November 16, 1918	Minneapolis, MN	Minnesota	6–0
29	November 1, 1919	Madison, WI	Minnesota	19–7
30	November 6, 1920	Minneapolis, MN	Wisconsin	3–0
31	October 29, 1921	Madison, WI	Wisconsin	35–0
32	November 4, 1922	Minneapolis, MN	Wisconsin	14–0
33	October 27, 1923	Madison, WI	Tie	0–0
34	October 18, 1924	Madison, WI	Tie	7–7
35	October 31, 1925	Minneapolis, MN	Tie	12–12
36	October 30, 1926	Madison, WI	Minnesota	16–10
37	October 29, 1927	Minneapolis, MN	Minnesota	13–7
38	November 24, 1928	Madison, WI	Minnesota	6–0
39	November 23, 1929	Minneapolis, MN	Minnesota	13–12
40	November 22, 1930	Madison, WI	Wisconsin	14–0
41	October 31, 1931	Minneapolis, MN	Minnesota	14–0
42	November 12, 1932	Madison, WI	Wisconsin	20–13
43	November 25, 1933	Minneapolis, MN	Minnesota	6–3
44	November 24, 1934	Madison, WI	Minnesota	34–0
45	November 23, 1935	Minneapolis, MN	Minnesota	33–7
46	November 21, 1936	Madison, WI	#2 Minnesota	24–0
47	November 20, 1937	Minneapolis, MN	#7 Minnesota	13–6
48	November 19, 1938	Madison, WI	Minnesota	21–0
49	November 25, 1939	Minneapolis, MN	Minnesota	23–6
50	November 23, 1940	Madison, WI	#1 Minnesota	22–13
51	November 22, 1941	Minneapolis, MN	#1 Minnesota	41–6
52	November 21, 1942	Madison, WI	#7 Wisconsin	20–6
53	November 20, 1943	Minneapolis, MN	Minnesota	25–13
54	November 25, 1944	Madison, WI	Minnesota	28–26
55	November 24, 1945	Minneapolis, MN	Wisconsin	26–12
56	November 23, 1946	Madison, WI	Minnesota	6–0
57	November 22, 1947	Minneapolis, MN	Minnesota	21–0
58	November 20, 1948	Madison, WI	#15 Minnesota	16–0
59	November 19, 1949	Minneapolis, MN	#8 Minnesota	14–6
60	November 25, 1950	Madison, WI	Wisconsin	14–0
61	November 24, 1951	Minneapolis, MN	#8 Wisconsin	30–6
62	November 22, 1952	Madison, WI	Tie	21–21
63	November 21, 1953	Minneapolis, MN	Tie	21–21
64	November 20, 1954	Madison, WI	#17 Wisconsin	27–0
65	November 19, 1955	Minneapolis, MN	Minnesota	21–6
66	November 24, 1956	Madison, WI	Tie	13–13
67	November 23, 1957	Minneapolis, MN	#18 Wisconsin	14–6
68	November 22, 1958	Madison, WI	Wisconsin	27–12

No.	Date	Location	Winner	Score
69	November 21, 1959	Minneapolis, MN	#9 Wisconsin	11–7
70	November 19, 1960	Madison, WI	#4 Minnesota	26–7
71	November 25, 1961	Minneapolis, MN	Wisconsin	23–21
72	November 24, 1962	Madison, WI	#3 Wisconsin	14–9
73	November 28, 1963	Minneapolis, MN	Minnesota	14–0
74	November 21, 1964	Madison, WI	Wisconsin	14–7
75	November 20, 1965	Minneapolis, MN	Minnesota	42–7
76	November 19, 1966	Madison, WI	Wisconsin	7–6
77	November 25, 1967	Minneapolis, MN	Minnesota	21–14
78	November 23, 1968	Madison, WI	Minnesota	23–15
79	November 22, 1969	Minneapolis, MN	Minnesota	35–10
80	November 21, 1970	Madison, WI	Wisconsin	39–14
81	November 20, 1971	Minneapolis, MN	Minnesota	23–21
82	November 25, 1972	Madison, WI	Minnesota	14–6
83	November 24, 1973	Minneapolis, MN	Minnesota	19–17
84	November 23, 1974	Madison, WI	Wisconsin	49–14
85	November 22, 1975	Minneapolis, MN	Minnesota	24–3
86	November 20, 1976	Madison, WI	Wisconsin	26–17
87	November 19, 1977	Minneapolis, MN	Minnesota	13–7
88	November 25, 1978	Madison, WI	Wisconsin	48–10
89	November 17, 1979	Minneapolis, MN	Wisconsin	42–37
90	November 22, 1980	Madison, WI	Wisconsin	25–7
91	November 21, 1981	Minneapolis, MN	Wisconsin	26–21
92	November 20, 1982	Madison, WI	Wisconsin	24–0
93	October 15, 1983	Minneapolis, MN	Wisconsin	56–17
94	October 13, 1984	Madison, WI	Minnesota	17–14
95	November 9, 1985	Minneapolis, MN	Minnesota	27–18
96	November 8, 1986	Madison, WI	Minnesota	27–20
97	November 14, 1987	Minneapolis, MN	Minnesota	22–19
98	November 12, 1988	Madison, WI	Wisconsin	14–7
99	November 4, 1989	Minneapolis, MN	Minnesota	24–22
100	November 3, 1990	Madison, WI	Minnesota	21–3
101	November 16, 1991	Minneapolis, MN	Wisconsin	19–16
102	November 14, 1992	Madison, WI	Wisconsin	34–6
103	October 23, 1993	Minneapolis, MN	Minnesota	28–21
104	October 22, 1994	Madison, WI	Minnesota	17–14
105	November 11, 1995	Minneapolis, MN	Wisconsin	34–27
106	November 9, 1996	Madison, WI	Wisconsin	45–28
107	October 25, 1997	Minneapolis, MN	Wisconsin	22–21
108	November 7, 1998	Madison, WI	#8 Wisconsin	26–7
109	October 9, 1999	Minneapolis, MN	#20 Wisconsin	20–17
110	November 4, 2000	Madison, WI	Wisconsin	41–20
111	November 24, 2001	Minneapolis, MN	Minnesota	42–31
112	November 23, 2002	Madison, WI	Wisconsin	49–31
113	November 8, 2003	Minneapolis, MN	#24 Minnesota	37–34
114	November 6, 2004	Madison, WI	#5 Wisconsin	38–14
115	October 15, 2005	Minneapolis, MN	#23 Wisconsin	38–34
116	October 14, 2006	Madison, WI	#25 Wisconsin	48–12
117	November 17, 2007	Minneapolis, MN	Wisconsin	41–34
118	November 15, 2008	Madison, WI	Wisconsin	35–32
119	October 3, 2009	Minneapolis, MN	Wisconsin	31–28
120	October 9, 2010	Madison, WI	#19 Wisconsin	41–23
121	November 23, 2011	Minneapolis, MN	#16 Wisconsin	42–13
122	October 20, 2012	Madison, WI	Wisconsin	38–13
123	November 23, 2013	Minneapolis, MN	#17 Wisconsin	20–7
124	November 29, 2014	Madison, WI	#14 Wisconsin	34–24
125	November 28, 2015	Minneapolis, MN	Wisconsin	31–21
126	November 26, 2016	Madison, WI	#5 Wisconsin	31–17
127	November 25, 2017	Minneapolis, MN	#5 Wisconsin	31–0
128	November 24, 2018	Madison, WI	Minnesota	37–15
129	November 30, 2019	Minneapolis, MN	#12 Wisconsin	38–17
130	December 19, 2020	Madison, WI	Wisconsin	20–17^{OT}
131	November 27, 2021	Minneapolis, MN	Minnesota	23–13
132	November 26, 2022	Madison, WI	Minnesota	23–16
133	November 25, 2023	Minneapolis, MN	Wisconsin	28–14
134	November 29, 2024	Madison, WI	Minnesota	24–7
135	November 29, 2025	Minneapolis, MN	Minnesota	17–7
Series: Minnesota leads 64–63–8

== See also ==
- List of NCAA college football rivalry games
- List of most-played college football series in NCAA Division I
- Packers–Vikings rivalry
- Minnesota–Wisconsin ice hockey rivalry
