= 1891 Missouri Tigers football team =

American college football season

1891 Missouri Tigers football
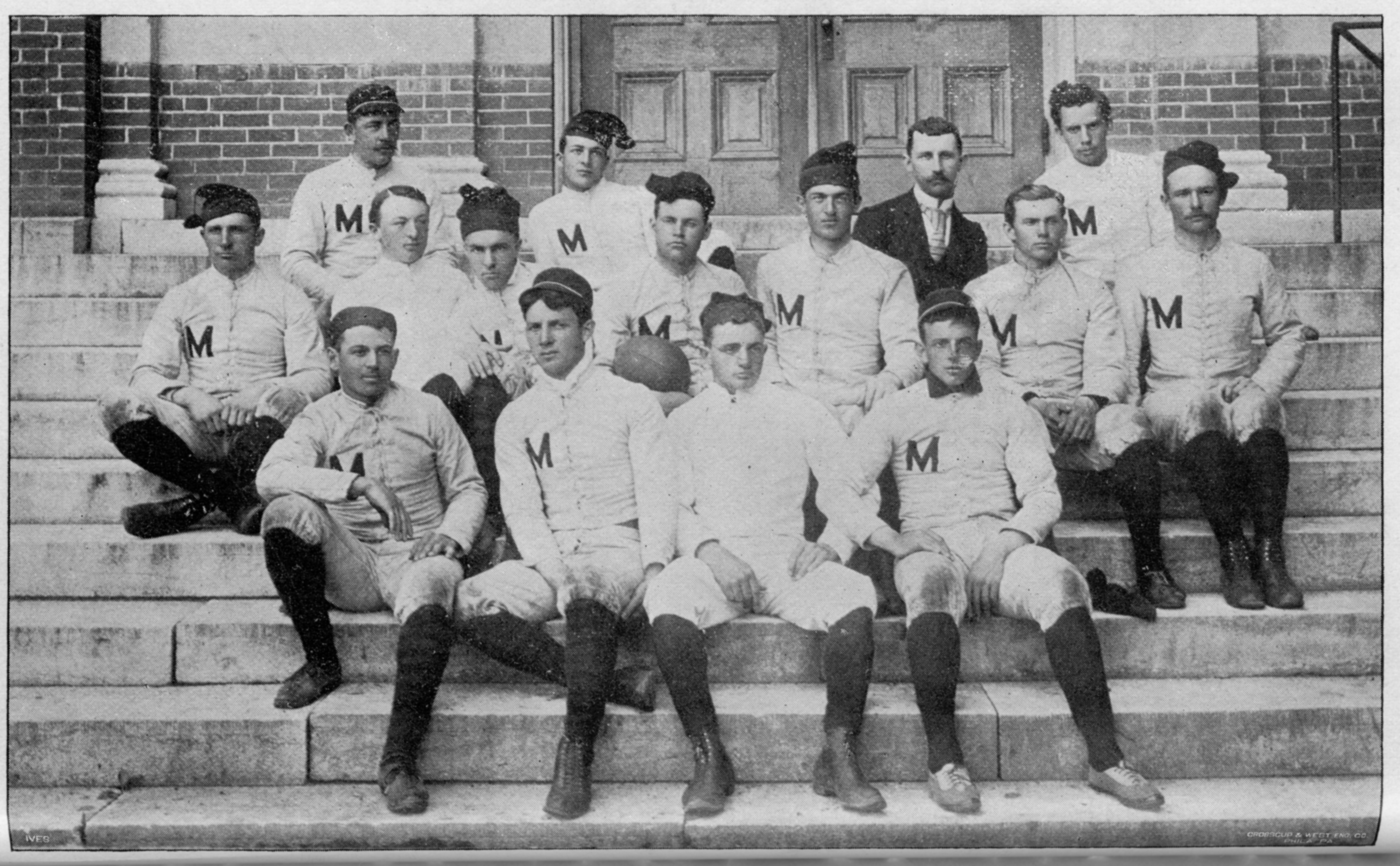
- Conference: Independent
- Record: 3–1
- Head coach: Hal Reid (1st season)
- Captain: Curtis Hill

1891 Midwestern college football independents records
	Conf.			Overall
Team	W	L	T	W		L		T
Ohio Wesleyan		–		4	–	0	–	0
Kansas		–		7	–	0	–	1
Illinois		–		5	–	1	–	0
Missouri		–		3	–	1	–	0
Lake Forest		–		6	–	2	–	0
Washington University		–		4	–	1	–	1
Minnesota		–		3	–	1	–	1
Wisconsin		–		3	–	1	–	1
Cincinnati		–		4	–	2	–	1
Iowa		–		3	–	2	–	0
Doane		–		2	–	2	–	0
Iowa College		–		1	–	1	–	1
Miami (OH)		–		1	–	1	–	0
Nebraska		–		2	–	2	–	0
Northwestern		–		2	–	2	–	3
Michigan		–		4	–	5	–	0
Ohio State		–		2	–	3	–	0
Case		–		1	–	2	–	0
Buchtel		–		1	–	3	–	0
Washburn		–		1	–	5	–	0
Michigan State Normal		–		0	–	2	–	0

The 1891 Missouri Tigers football team was an American football team that represented the University of Missouri as an independent during the 1891 college football season. In the school's second year of intercollegiate football, the team was led by head coach Hal Reid and compiled a 3–1 record.

== Schedule ==
Date	Time	Opponent	Site	Result	Attendance	Source
October 31	2:30 p.m.	vs. Kansas	Exposition Park; Kansas City, MO (rivalry)	L 8–22	3,000	
November 5		Kansas City YMCA	Columbia, MO	W 8–0		
November 26	2:30 p.m.	Washburn	Columbia, MO	W 34–6		
December 7		Drury	Columbia, MO	W 54–0		
