= 1891 Washburn Ichabods football team =

American college football season

1891 Washburn Ichabods football
- Conference: Independent
- Record: 1–5
- Home stadium: Washburn grounds

1891 Midwestern college football independents records
	Conf.			Overall
Team	W	L	T	W		L		T
Ohio Wesleyan		–		4	–	0	–	0
Kansas		–		7	–	0	–	1
Illinois		–		5	–	1	–	0
Missouri		–		3	–	1	–	0
Lake Forest		–		6	–	2	–	0
Washington University		–		4	–	1	–	1
Minnesota		–		3	–	1	–	1
Wisconsin		–		3	–	1	–	1
Cincinnati		–		4	–	2	–	1
Iowa		–		3	–	2	–	0
Doane		–		2	–	2	–	0
Iowa College		–		1	–	1	–	1
Miami (OH)		–		1	–	1	–	0
Nebraska		–		2	–	2	–	0
Northwestern		–		2	–	2	–	3
Michigan		–		4	–	5	–	0
Ohio State		–		2	–	3	–	0
Case		–		1	–	2	–	0
Buchtel		–		1	–	3	–	0
Washburn		–		1	–	5	–	0
Michigan State Normal		–		0	–	2	–	0

The 1891 Washburn Ichabods football team represented Washburn College—now known as Washburn University—as an independent during the 1891 college football season. In their second season of football, the Ichabods compiled a record of 1–5.

== Schedule ==
Date	Time	Opponent	Site	Result	Source
October 27	4:15 p.m.	at Kansas City YMCA	Bale's park; Kansas City, MO	W 8–2	
November 7		at Baker (KS)	Baldwin City, KS	L 18–28	
November 17	4:00 p.m.	Kansas	Topeka, KS	L 10–32	
November 21	4:00 p.m.	at Kansas	Lawrence, KS	L 10–38	
November 26	2:30 p.m.	at Missouri	Columbia, MO	L 6–34	
December 7	2:30 p.m.	Baker	Washburn grounds; Topeka, KS	L 0–46	
