= 1891 Iowa Hawkeyes football team =

American college football season

1891 Iowa Hawkeyes football
- Conference: Independent
- Record: 3–2
- Head coach: None
- Home stadium: Iowa Field

1891 Midwestern college football independents records
	Conf.			Overall
Team	W	L	T	W		L		T
Ohio Wesleyan		–		4	–	0	–	0
Kansas		–		7	–	0	–	1
Illinois		–		5	–	1	–	0
Missouri		–		3	–	1	–	0
Lake Forest		–		6	–	2	–	0
Washington University		–		4	–	1	–	1
Minnesota		–		3	–	1	–	1
Wisconsin		–		3	–	1	–	1
Cincinnati		–		4	–	2	–	1
Iowa		–		3	–	2	–	0
Doane		–		2	–	2	–	0
Iowa College		–		1	–	1	–	1
Miami (OH)		–		1	–	1	–	0
Nebraska		–		2	–	2	–	0
Northwestern		–		2	–	2	–	3
Michigan		–		4	–	5	–	0
Ohio State		–		2	–	3	–	0
Case		–		1	–	2	–	0
Buchtel		–		1	–	3	–	0
Washburn		–		1	–	5	–	0
Michigan State Normal		–		0	–	2	–	0

The 1891 Iowa Hawkeyes football team represented the State University of Iowa ("S.U.I."), now commonly known as the University of Iowa, during the 1891 college football season. It ended in controversy. Following victories over Cornell College and Nebraska, and losses to Minnesota and Iowa College, the Hawkeyes were 2–2 heading into their final game against Kansas in Kansas City, Missouri. Following an argument where Kansas argued that Iowa had not put the ball into play fairly, the Jayhawks left the field claiming a 14–12 victory. However, the game was not called until after the next play, when Iowa scored an uncontested touchdown. Today, Iowa lists the game as an 18–14 Hawkeye victory.

Earlier in the year, two firsts were established in Hawkeye football history. On November 2, the Hawkeyes played rival Minnesota for the first of many times in school history. Later, on November 26, the Hawkeyes played their first game outside the state of Iowa in a win against Nebraska. The game was played in Omaha, Nebraska.

== Schedule ==
Date	Time	Opponent	Site	Result	Source
October 24		Cornell (IA)	Iowa Field; Iowa City, IA	W 64–6	
November 2		Minnesota	Iowa Field; Iowa City, IA (rivalry)	L 4–42	
November 9		at Iowa College	Grinnell, IA	L 4–6	
November 26		vs. Nebraska	Omaha, NE (rivalry)	W 22–0	
December 5	2:30 p.m.	vs. Kansas	Exposition Park; Kansas City, MO	W 18–14^{‡}	

^{‡} The outcome of this game is disputed (see above).
