= 1891 Kansas Jayhawks football team =

American college football season

1891 Kansas Jayhawks football

KIAA champion
- Conference: Kansas Intercollegiate Athletic Association
- Record: 7–0-1 (4–0 Kansas Intercollegiate Athletic Association)
- Head coach: Edwin Mortimer Hopkins (1st season)
- Captain: John Kenzie

The 1891 Kansas Jayhawks football team represented the University of Kansas as members of the Kansas Intercollegiate Athletic Association during the 1891 college football season. In their first and only season under English professor and head football coach Edwin Mortimer Hopkins, the Jayhawks compiled a 7–0–1 record and outscored opponents by a total of 160 to 54. The Jayhawks played their first ever game against rival Missouri on October 31, a game they won 22–8. John Kenzie was the team captain.

== Schedule ==
Date	Time	Opponent	Site	Result	Attendance	Source
October 31	2:30 p.m.	vs. Missouri	Exposition Park; Kansas City, MO (rivalry)	W 22–8	3,000	
November 17	4:00 p.m.	at Washburn	Topeka, KS	W 32–10		
November 21	4:00 p.m.	Washburn	Lawrence, KS	W 38–10		
November 26	3:00 p.m.	at Kansas City YMCA	Exposition Park; Kansas City, MO	W 22–4	2,000	
November 28		at Baker	Baldwin City, KS	W 18–4	2,000	
December 5	2:30 p.m.	vs. Iowa	Exposition Park; Kansas City, MO	W 14–12		
December 17		Baker	Lawrence, KS	W 8–0	2,000	
December 22	3:00 p.m.	vs. Washington University	Exposition Park; Kansas City, MO	T 6–6		
