= List of Michigan Wolverines football trainers =

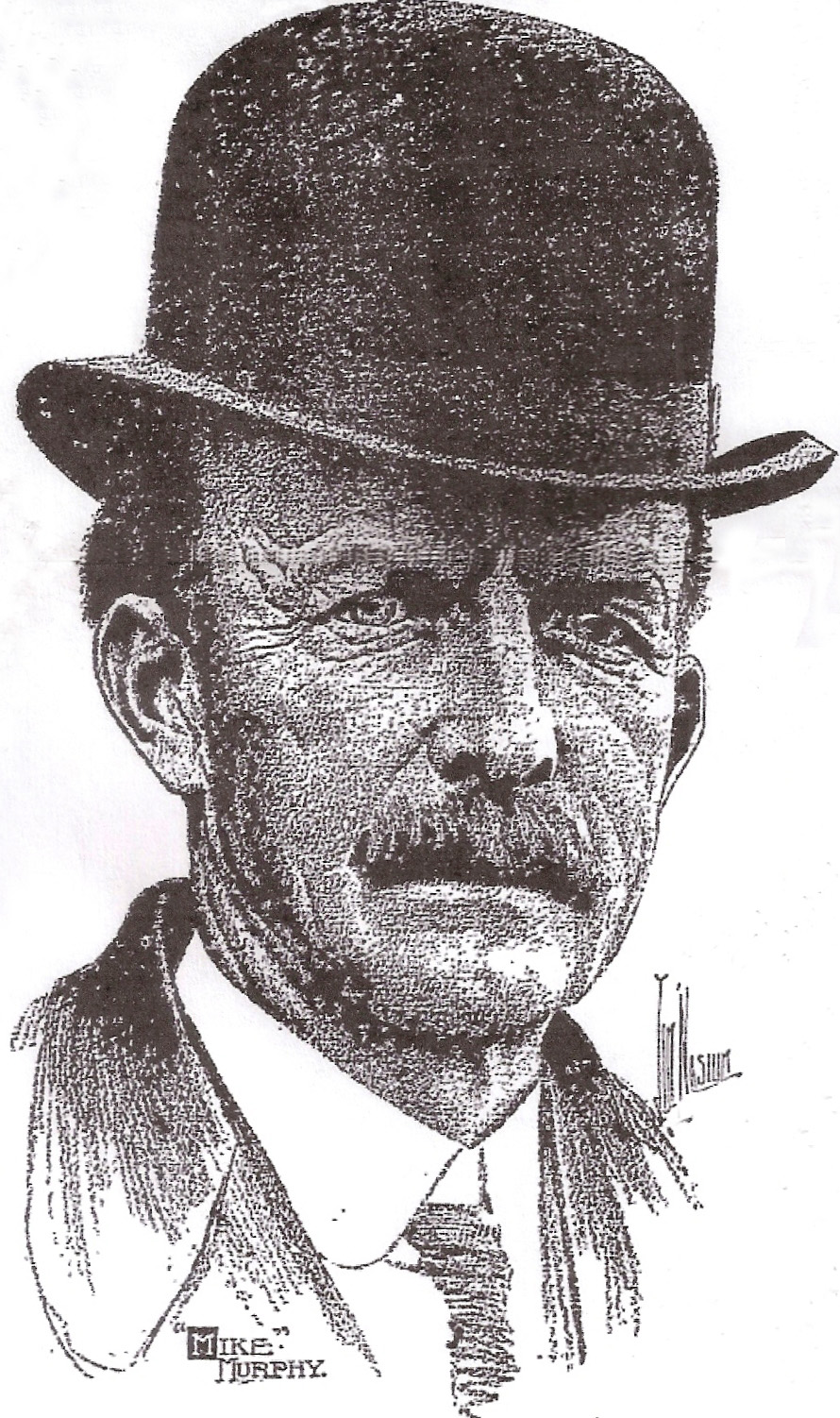
Mike Murphy, 1891

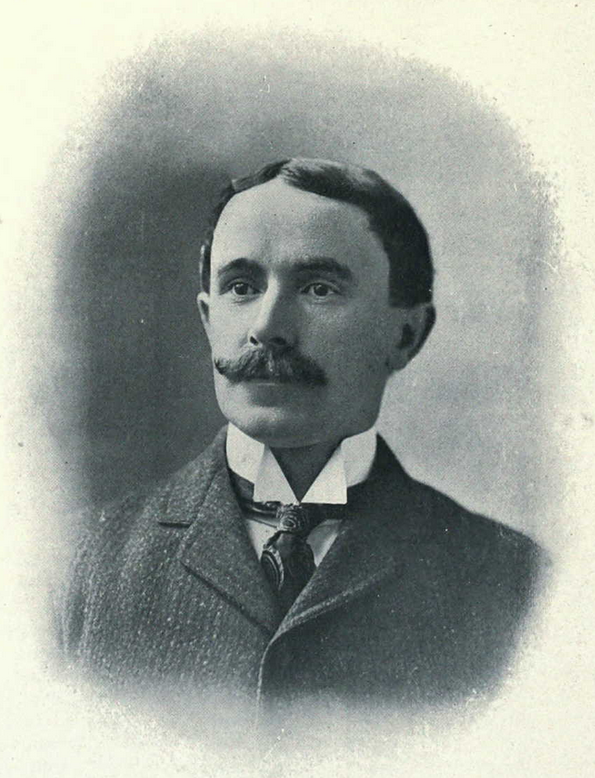
Keene Fitzpatrick, 1894–1895, 1898, 1900–1909

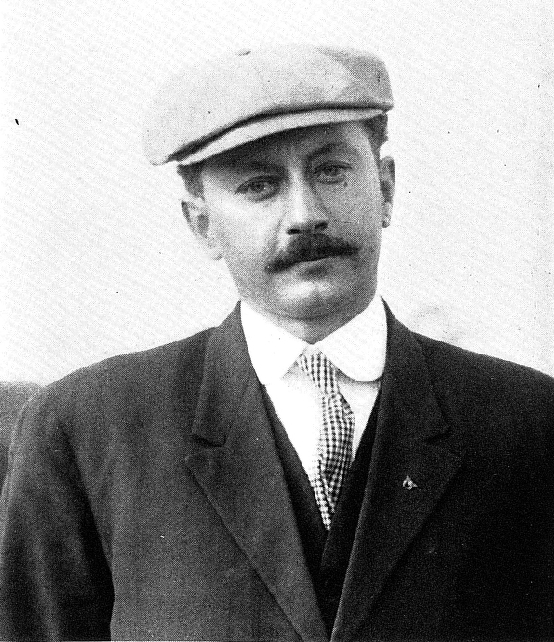
Alvin Kraenzlein, 1910–1911

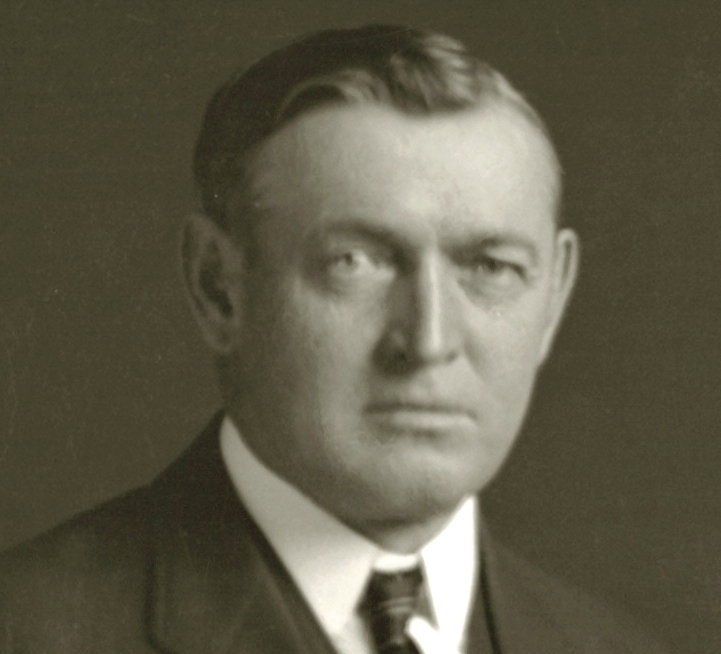
Stephen Farrell, 1912–1915

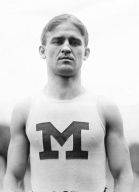
Archie Hahn, 1920-21

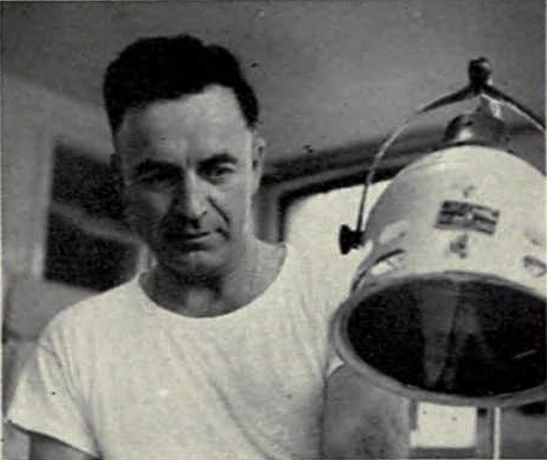
Jim Hunt, 1947–1967

This is a list of Michigan Wolverines football athletic trainers.

- Mike Murphy (1891): Michigan's first football trainer in 1891. He served as an athletic trainer and coach at Yale University (1887–1889, 1892–1896, 1901–1905), Detroit Athletic Club (1889–1892), University of Michigan (1891), Villanova University (1894), University of Pennsylvania (1896–1901, 1905–1913), and the New York Athletic Club (1890–1900). He also coached the American track athletes at the Summer Olympics in 1900, 1908, and 1912. He also spent a year in approximately 1884 as the trainer of heavyweight boxing champion John L. Sullivan. The Washington Post in 1913 called Murphy "the father of American track athletics." He was considered the premier athletic trainer of his era and was said to have "revolutionized the methods of training athletes and reduced it to a science." He is credited with establishing many innovative techniques for track and field, including the crouching start for sprinters.
- Edward Moulton (1893): Michigan's second athletic trainer, held the position in 1893. He was an American sprinter, athletic trainer, and coach. He was a professional sprinter who won more than 300 races and was regarded as the American sprinting champion from 1872 to 1878. Moulton later worked as a trainer of sprinters, wrestlers, boxers, and bicyclists. He trained many well-known track and field athletes from the 1880s through the 1910s, including the original "world's fastest human," Al Tharnish, and Olympic medalists Alvin Kraenzlein (four gold medals in 1900), Charlie Paddock (two gold medals and one silver in 1920), Morris Kirksey (one gold and one silver in 1920), George Horine (bronze medal in 1912), and Feg Murray (bronze medal in 1920). In the 1890s, Moulton was also employed as a trainer and coach of American football, including one year as the head football coach at the University of Minnesota. Moulton also coached athletics and worked as a trainer at other schools, including the University of Michigan, the University of Iowa, and the University of Wisconsin. He spent most of the last 22 years of his life working as a coach and trainer of track and field, football and baseball at Stanford University.
- Keene Fitzpatrick (1894–1895, 1898, 1900–1909): Michigan's third football trainer, he held the position from 1894 to 1895, in 1898 and 1900 to 1909. He was principally known as a track coach, athletic trainer, professor of physical training and gymnasium director for 42 years at Yale University (1890–1891, 1896–1898), Michigan (1894–1895, 1898–1910), and Princeton University (1910–1932). He is considered "one of the pioneers of intercollegiate sport."
- James Robinson (1896)
- Tom Cox (1897)
- Alvin Kraenzlein (1910–1911): Michigan's sixth football trainer, holding the position from 1910 to 1911. He was principally known as the first athlete to win four Olympic titles in a single Olympic Games. As of 2012, he is still the only track and field athlete to have done so in individual events only.
- Stephen Farrell (1912–1915) - He was Michigan's seventh football trainer, holding the position from 1912 to 1915. He was also professional track athlete, circus performer and track coach. He was a professional foot-racer in the 1880s and 1890s, beginning as a competitor in the hook, hose and ladder teams of New England. He was the first American to win England's Sheffield Cup on two occasions and competed in races from 100 yards to one mile. He became known as "the greatest professional footracer this country has ever known." Seeking out new challenges, Farrell performed with the Barnum & Bailey Circus for several years racing against a horse, and he was never known to ever lose to the horse. Farrell later became a track coach at Yale University, the University of Maine, Ohio State University, and the University of Michigan. He coached at Michigan for 18 years and developed many great athletes, including DeHart Hubbard and Eddie Tolan.
- Harry Tuthill (1916–1917)
- George A. May (1918)
- Archie Hahn, William Fallon (1920–1921)
- Archie Hahn (1922)
- Charles B. Hoyt, William Fallon (1923–1924)
- Charles B. Hoyt (1925–1929)
- Ray Roberts (1930–1940)
- Charles B. Hoyt (1941–1942)
- Ray Roberts (1943–1946)
- Jim Hunt (1947–1967)
- Lindsy McLean (1968–1978)
- Russ Miller (1979–1990)
- Paul Schmidt (1991–2016)
- Dave Granito (2016–2019)
- Philip Dean Johnson (2019–present)
