= John W. Overton =

American middle distance runner (1894–1918)

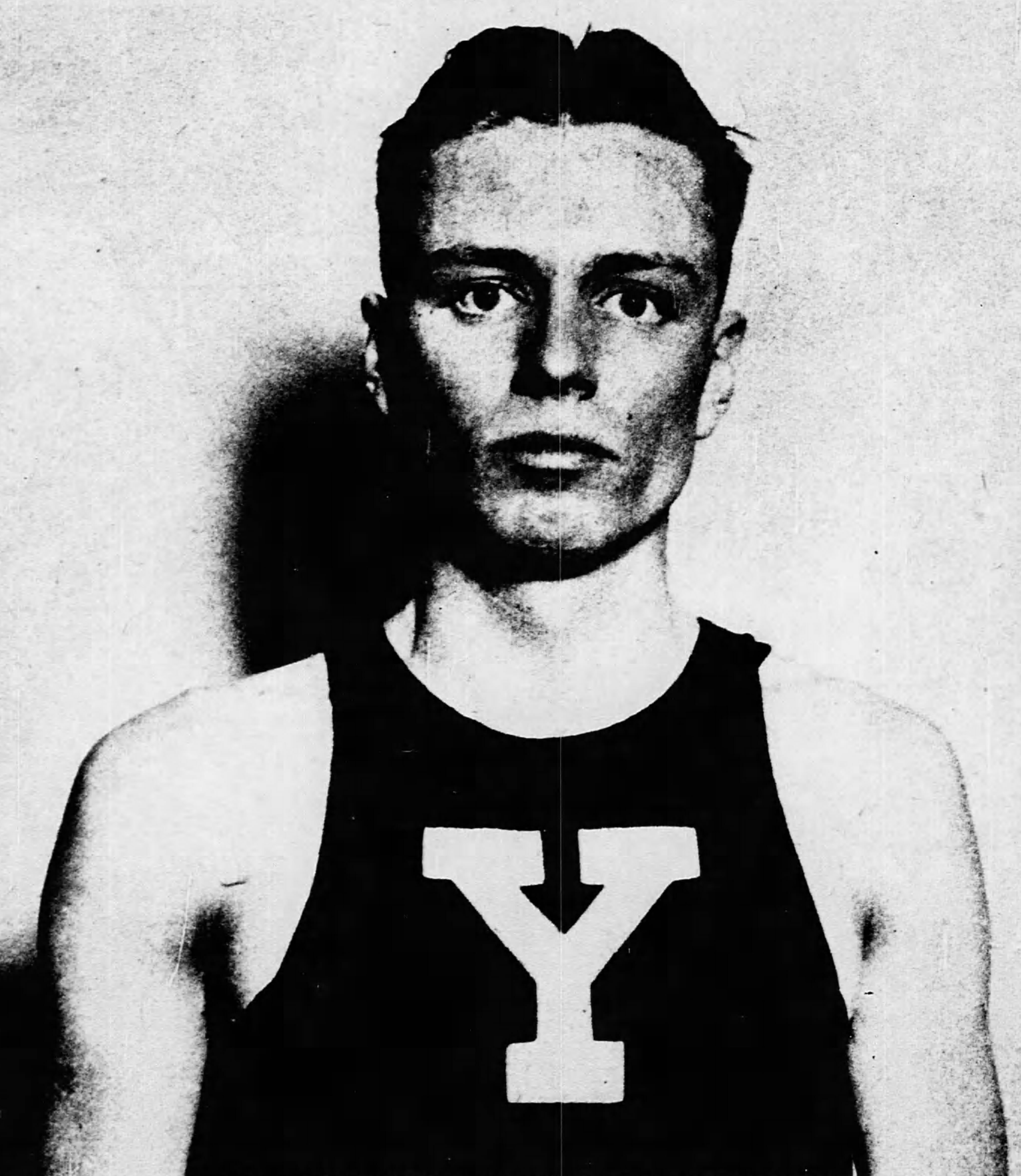
- John W. Overton in his Yale uniform

Personal information
- Nickname: Johnny
- Born: John Williams Overton; October 10, 1894 Nashville, Tennessee, U.S.
- Died: July 19, 1918 (aged 23) Soissons, France
- Resting place: Mount Olivet Cemetery (Nashville)
- Education: The Hill School; Yale University
- Occupations: runner, marine
- Years active: 1915–1917

Sport
- Sport: Track and Cross-Country
- University team: Yale
- Coached by: Michael Sweeney, William Nelson Queal, John Mack

John Williams Overton (October 10, 1894 – July 19, 1918), also known as Johnny Overton, was an American middle-distance runner and soldier who was killed in action in World War I. He was a national champion track and cross country runner at Yale University and joined the United States Marine Corps after his graduation in 1917. In track, he set the world records for the indoor mile run and indoor 1,000-yard distance in 1917. He was also the college cross country champion in 1915 and 1916.

== Early life ==
Overton was born in Nashville, Tennessee, on October 10, 1894. His father was Jesse M. Overton. In Nashville, Overton was a member of the Glen Leven Presbyterian Church. He attended Wallace University school in Nashville before transferring to The Hill School, a preparatory school in Pottstown, Pennsylvania, where he graduated in 1913. He enrolled at Yale University, graduating with a bachelor's degree in arts in 1917. He was a member of prominent societies at Yale: Skull and Bones and Sigma Delta Psi, the later of which he was president. In the summer of 1916 he trained with the Yale Battery, a Yale-based military group.

== Running career ==
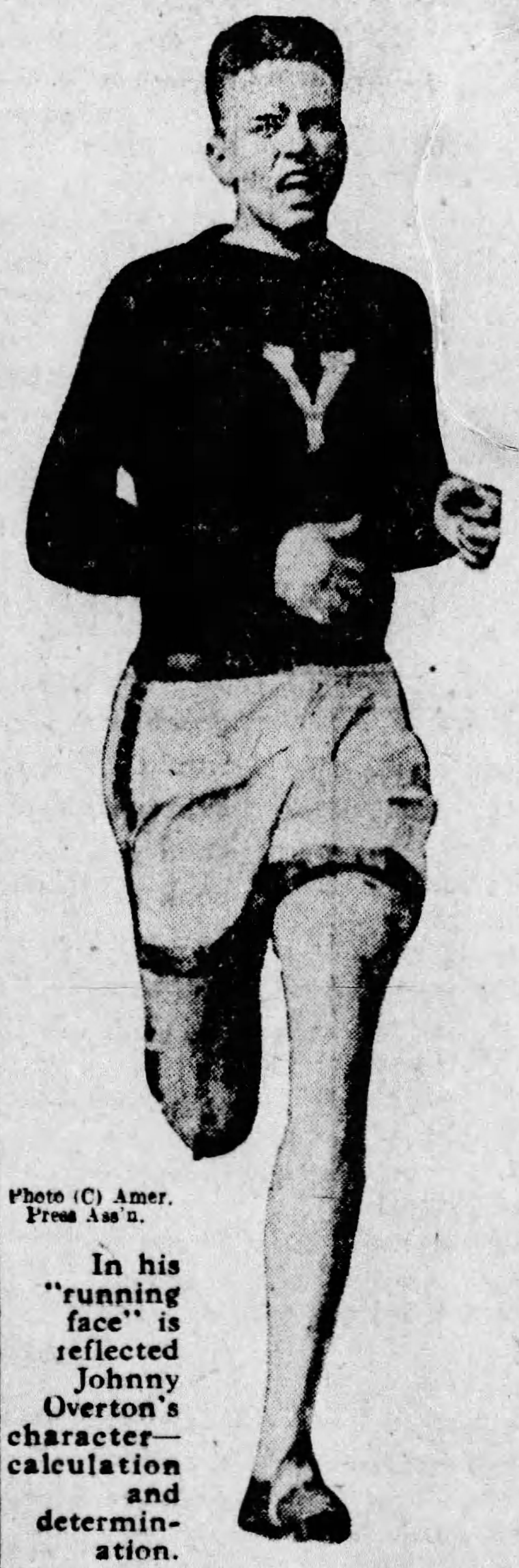
Overton was widely known as a track and cross-country star while at Yale.

At Yale, Overton became a star track and cross-country athlete. There, he was trained by Michael Sweeney, William Nelson Queal, and John Mack. Overton was described as tall and rangy and running with a great, loping stride. Overton's strategy was to allow another runner to set the early pace but to finish strong, and he ran with an "air of quiet determination". He had no opportunity to run in the Olympics because the 1916 Summer Olympics were cancelled due to World War I, the first time the Olympics had been cancelled since the modern revival.

He won the intercollegiate cross-country championships in 1915 and 1916. He finished second in the two mile at the intercollegiate track championships in 1915.

=== 1916 ===
In January he won the Rodman Wanamaker mile and a half event in the Millrose Games in New York City. Later that winter he set the world and American record in the indoor 1,000-yard (910 m) run at 2:15.4 while winning the indoor AAU National Championships. He was the anchor runner in Yale's world record tying 4 × 880-yard (800 m) relay team in early May, 1916. He also finished third in the two mile at the intercollegiate track championships in that year.

He placed third at the 1916 National Cross Country Championships behind Ville Kyrönen and Hannes Kolehmainen, both Finnish Olympic medalists. As the first U.S. citizen across the finish line, he was the national champion.

=== 1917 ===
In 1917 he set the indoor world record for the mile at Meadowbrook Games in Philadelphia with a time of 4:16.0. He took over two seconds off of Abel Kiviat's record of 4:18.2 set more than four years earlier. The record, Kiviat took had stood for only three days. He again set the world and American record in the indoor 1,000-yard (910 m) run March 17 at the AAU Indoor Track and Field Championships at The Armory in New York City. This time his pace was 2:14.0, taking a remarkable 1.4 seconds off his own previous record. That performance was ranked number 43 of the top 100 performances in the history of The Armory. Later in March, he lost in a widely discussed race against Joie Ray at the games of the John Wanamaker Commercial Institute at Madison Square Garden. During college he became a member of the Mercury Foot club, intending to race under that group while still in college, but the Amateur Athletic Union disallowed his racing for both Mercury and Yale. After college, he planned to compete with the New York Athletic Club.

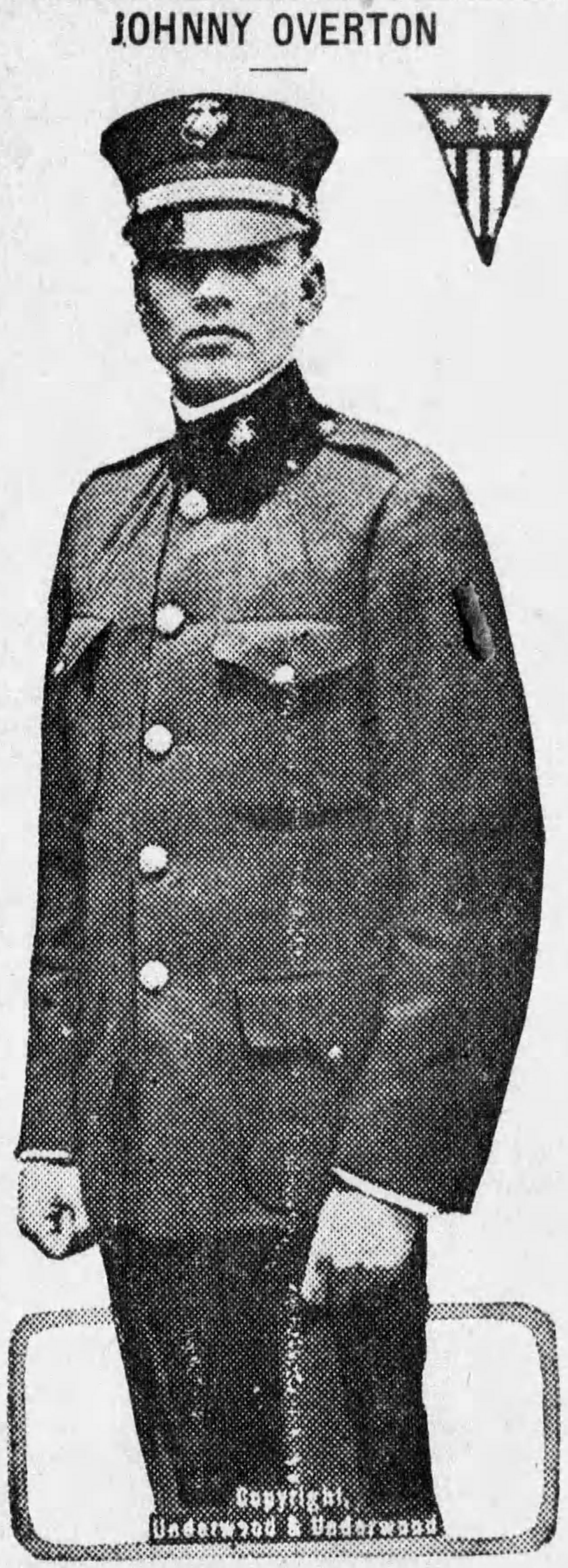
Johnny Overton in uniform as 2nd lieutenant in the US Marine Corps in 1917

== Marines ==
Overton enlisted in the Marines when the United States joined World War I in April, 1917. In May, General George Barnett called for recommendations from one college from every state for ten men to be given temporary commissions in the Marine Corps. Along with his friend Samuel W. Meek, Overton was one of the ten selected by Yale. Overton was training at Indian Head Naval Surface Warfare Center before moving to Marine Corps Base Quantico on July 18, 1917, where he entered officer school. He graduated from officers school in September, and his promotion to the rank of second lieutenant in the Marine Corps Reserve was confirmed that same month. Overton remained at Quantico where he helped with the physical training program until February 1918. Although he graduated from Quantico in the artillery division along with Meek and two other Yale classmates, when they learned that artillery was not to be sent to France, they asked to transfer to infantry.

== In France ==
He embarked for France on February 4, 1918, as a member of the 119th Company of the First Replacement Battalion, U.S. Marine Corps, arriving in Brest on February 26. His company then entered training at Châtillon-sur-Cher, while Overton went to officers' training school at Gondremont, France, near Bezange-la-Grande. He graduated at the head of his class on May 31, 1918, and was sent on June 1 for observation with the Forty Second Regiment of French Chasseurs stationed in the Vosges Mountains. He was initiated as an honorary member of the French Chasseurs and remained with the regiment from June 1–13. When the Marines became engaged at Chateau-Thierry in early June, he asked to be transferred from his company which was still in training to the front line, and on June 16 he arrived at a marine camp in the middle of the Battle of Belleau Wood, which had begun June 1 and would continue until June 26. There, Overton was assigned second lieutenant in the 18th Company, 6th Regiment, U. S. Marines, a part of the 4th Marine Brigade and 2nd Division. He served at Belleau Wood until July 9. On July 2 he was promoted to first lieutenant, but would not learn of that before his death. From July 9–16 he was stationed at Nanteuil-sur-Marne. On July 16, his regiment along with the 5th Regiment were moved to the French front near Soissons to join the Second Battle of the Marne. The division was then a part of Marshal Ferdinand Foch's allied offensive on the Soissons salient begun July 18, 1918, his division under French General Charles Mangin.

== Death ==
Navy Cross citation:

The President of the United States of America takes pride in presenting the Navy Cross (Posthumously) to Second Lieutenant John William Overton (MCSN: 0-3071), United States Marine Corps, for extraordinary heroism while serving with the 6th Regiment (Marines), 2d Division, A.E.F. in action near Vierzy, France, 19 July 1918. While valiantly leading his platoon in an attack against the enemy, under severe machine-gun and artillery fire, Second Lieutenant Overton was mortally wounded. His courageous conduct had a great moral effect upon his men and helped to insure the success of the attack.

On July 19, 1918, the second day of the offensive, Overton was hit by a shell fragment near his heart and died a few hours later. After the battle, Yale classmate and fellow Nashvillean, Samuel W. Meek, found Overton's body and buried it in a wheatfield about 2,000 yards from Vierzy. In 1923, Overton's father died in a car accident and Overton's mother decided to have her son's body brought to Nashville. He is buried next to his father at Mount Olivet Cemetery.

After his death, he was awarded the Navy Cross and the Distinguished Service Cross. He was also awarded the Croix de Guerre with Palm from the French Army and was frequently memorialized in poetry, including a piece by Grantland Rice called "A Marine Comes Home". In 2005, he was posthumously inducted into the Tennessee Sports Hall of Fame.

== National titles ==
- AAU Indoor Track and Field Championships
  - 1000-yard run: 1916, 1917
- USA Cross Country Championships
  - Senior race: 1916

== Bibliography ==
- Simmons, Edwin Howard. Through the Wheat: The US Marines in World War I. Naval Institute Press, 2014.
