= Pooch Donovan =

American sports coach

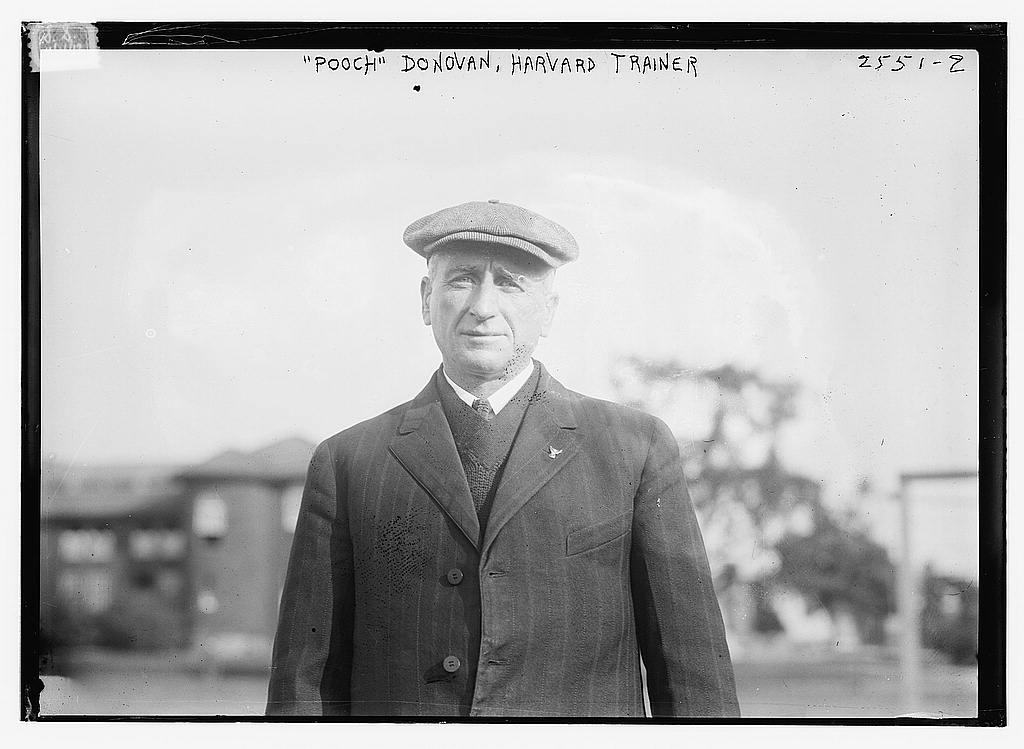

Biographical details
- Born: September 19, 1866; Natick, Massachusetts, U.S.
- Died: August 21, 1928 (aged 61); Natick, Massachusetts, U.S.

Coaching career (HC unless noted)

Track and field
- 1907–1921: Harvard
- 1925–1928: Harvard

Football
- 1918: Harvard

Head coaching record
- Overall: 2–1 (football)

William Francis "Pooch" Donovan Sr. (September 19, 1866 – August 21, 1928) was an American athletic trainer and coach. He was head coach of the Harvard Crimson track team from 1908 to 1921 and 1925 to 1928, trainer of the Harvard Crimson football team from 1907 to 1925, head coach of the football team in 1918, and trainer for the Harvard Crimson baseball team from 1907 to 1928.

== Biography ==
Donovan was born on September 19, 1866, in Natick, Massachusetts. He had a brother, Edward S. Donovan who was called Piper Donovan, who was a noted track athlete. His first cousin, Keene Fitzpatrick, was the longtime track coach at the University of Michigan. Donovan competed in track and football and was a member of the Natick Ladder Truck Team with future college trainers Keene Fitzpatrick, Mike Murphy, and John J. Mack.

Donovan began his career in 1887 as an assistant trainer under Mike Murphy at Yale University. In 1892 he became the athletic trainer for the Cleveland Athletic Club. The following year he moved to Worcester, Massachusetts, and began training athletes at the Worcester Oval.

In the fall of 1893, while briefly enrolled as a 27-year-old student at Phillips Exeter Academy, Donovan played halfback on the school's football team and led it to victory over its traditional archrival, Phillips Andover. Controversy ensued when the Boston Herald challenged Donovan's eligibility and amateur status by recounting his athletic past, which included running races for payment and cash prizes. Suspicions arose that Donovan and two teammates had been brought to Exeter solely to play football. In reaction to the controversy, Andover severed athletic relations with Exeter, initiating a three-year hiatus in the Andover–Exeter rivalry.

In 1895 he became the physical director of the Worcester Academy. In the fall of that year, he was trainer and halfback on the Duquesne Country and Athletic Club football team. He served as the athletic trainer at Brown University from 1896 to 1897 then returned to the Worcester Academy, where he trained Arthur Duffey and John W. Mayhew.

In August 1906, Donovan was hired by Harvard to train their football and baseball teams starting in the fall of 1907. In 1908 he became the coach of Harvard's track team. He coached the 1918 Harvard Crimson football team, which only played three games due to World War I. In 1921, Donovan was succeeded as track coach by W. J. Bingham, but stayed on as trainer of the football and baseball teams. In 1925, track coach Eddie Farrell replaced Donovan as trainer of the Harvard football team. Donovan served as track coach during the football season in Farrell's absence.

Donovan had a heart attack in Amsterdam after the 1928 Summer Olympics. He returned home on August 12, 1928. He died on August 21, 1928, and was buried on August 24, 1928.

== Head coaching record ==
=== Football ===
Year	Team	Overall	Conference	Standing	Bowl/playoffs
Harvard Crimson (Independent) (1918)
1918	Harvard	2–1			
Harvard:		2–1			
Total:		2–1			
