= Keene Fitzpatrick =

American athletic trainer (1864–1944)

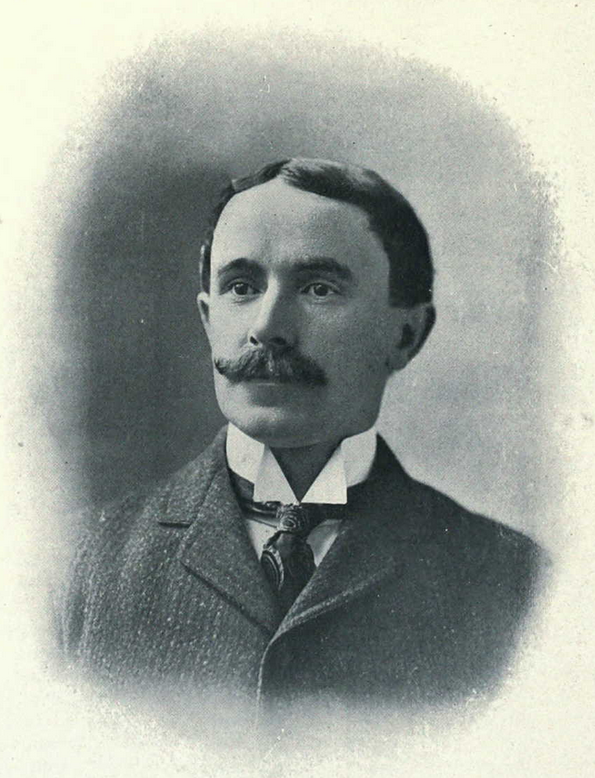
- Fitzpatrick, c. 1904

Biographical details
- Born: December 25, 1864; Natick, Massachusetts, U.S.
- Died: May 22, 1944 (aged 79); Princeton, New Jersey, U.S.
- Education: University of Michigan

Coaching career (HC unless noted)
- 1890–1891: Yale (trainer)
- 1896–1898: Yale (trainer)
- 1894–1895: Michigan (trainer)
- 1898–1910: Michigan (trainer)
- 1910–1932: Princeton (trainer, kicking)

Dennis Keene Fitzpatrick (December 25, 1864 – May 22, 1944) was an American track coach, athletic trainer, professor of physical training and gymnasium director for 42 years at Yale University (1890–1891, 1896–1898), the University of Michigan (1894–1895, 1898–1910), and Princeton University (1910–1932). He was considered "one of the pioneers of intercollegiate sport".

== Early years ==
Dennis Keene Fitzpatrick was born on 27 December 1864 in Imphrick, Buttevant, Co. Cork, Ireland. In a 1920 U.S. Passport Application, Fitzpatrick listed his date of birth as December 25, 1865 and his place of birth as Boston. His father was born in Ireland.

As a young man in the 1880s, Fitzpatrick was a sprinter with the national champion Natick Hook and Ladder Company team. As a coach, he is credited with inventing a new pole-vaulting technique and with coaching numerous Olympic gold medalists, including Archie Hahn, Ralph Rose, Charles Dvorak and Ralph Craig. He was also the trainer for the Michigan Wolverines football teams from 1894 to 1895 and 1898–1909, including Fielding H. Yost's legendary "point-a-minute" teams from 1901 to 1905. Fitzpatrick was born in Natick, Massachusetts, in 1864. He died in Princeton, New Jersey, at age 79 in 1944.

=== Natick Hook and Ladder Company ===
In the late 1870s and 1880s, New England was "the home of the professional athlete". Teams of professional sprinters formed in New England. For a decade, the sport thrived, and Fitzpatrick was one of the leading sprinters. Sprinters took up residence in small towns and competed with the local fire companies that engaged in hose races with other companies. Fitzpatrick "was one of the first to organize the famous hose, hook and ladder teams, when racing of this kind was so popular and the rivalry between Massachusetts towns was keen."

The "Natick Hook and Ladder Company" was the most successful of the New England teams, becoming "the world's championship organization". The Natick team in the 1880s included Fitzpatrick and some of the leading sprinters of the era, including Mike Murphy, William F. Donovan, Sid Peet, Johnny Mack, Steve Farrell, and world champion Piper Donovan. In 1885, the only sweepstake race to determine the national champion of American professional sprinters was held and won by Natick's Piper Donovan. Several members of the Natick Hook and Ladder Company went on to become leading trainers at American universities, leading to Massachusetts being called the "mother of athletic mentors".

== Professional career ==
=== Yale University ===
In 1890 and 1891, Fitzpatrick was an athletic trainer at Yale University. Legendary football coach Amos Alonzo Stagg was a pupil of Fitzpatrick at Yale in 1890. Time magazine wrote in its obituary of Fitzpatrick: "When he was just beginning his coaching career, at Yale, he gave later-famed coach Amos Alonzo Stagg a primer course in the art of the fast breakaway."

=== Detroit Athletic Club ===
In 1892, Fitzpatrick's former Natick teammate, Mike Murphy, left his job as trainer at the Detroit Athletic Club to become the trainer at Yale. On Murphy's recommendation, Fitzpatrick was hired to replace him in Detroit, a position which he held until 1894. While Fitzpatrick was the trainer in Detroit, the club's leading sprinter, Harry S. Jewett, was the champion sprinter of the United States and Canada. In 1892, Jewett won the American 100-yard and one-furlong championships. Jewett also set an American record in the 220-yard dash in 1893.

=== University of Michigan: 1894–1896 ===
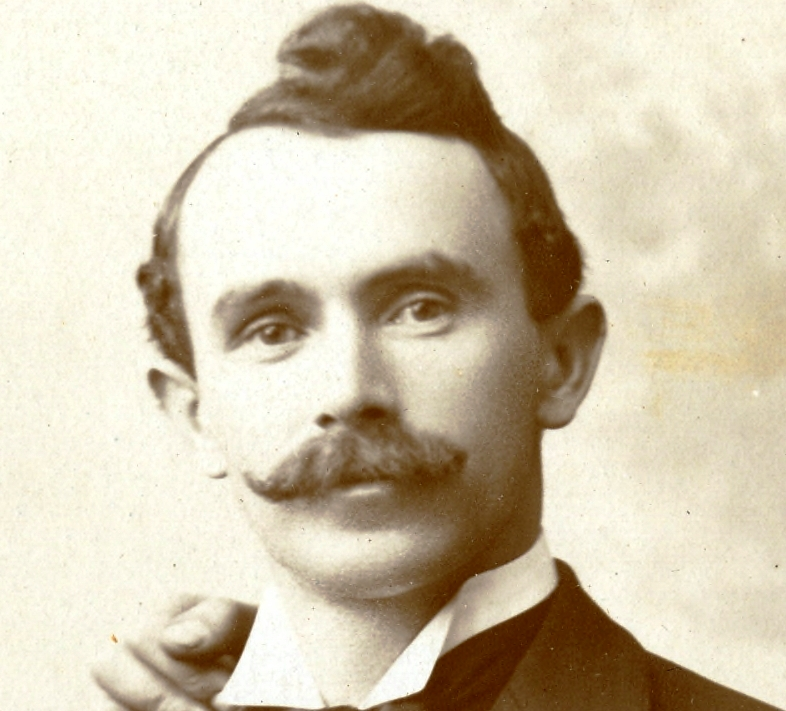
Fitzpatrick cropped from 1894 Michigan football team photograph

In 1894, Fitzpatrick was hired by the University of Michigan as the trainer for the school's football team. During Fitzpatrick's first stint as Michigan's trainer, the football teams had two of the best seasons in the school's history. The team lost only one game each year and outscored opponents 510–98. During these two seasons, Michigan also proved that a Western football team could compete with the major Eastern schools that dominated the game to that time. In 1894, Michigan defeated Cornell, 12–4, and in 1895, the team beat Harvard, 4–0. The victory over Cornell in 1894 marked the first time that a Western school defeated an established power from the East. Prior to 1894, Michigan had never beaten one of the Eastern powers, losing to Yale, 46–0 in 1883, and to Cornell, 56–0 in 1889, 58–12 in 1891, and 44–0 in 1892.

The team's record in 1894 and 1895 is set forth below.

University of Michigan Football
Year	Record	Points Scored	Points Allowed
1894	9–1–1	244	84
1895	8–1	266	14
Total	17–2–1	510	98

After two seasons at Michigan, Fitzpatrick had proven his value as an "expert trainer of football squads" and was recruited by Yale. When Fitzpatrick accepted the job at Yale, The Philadelphia Inquirer described the impact of his departure on the Michigan football team:

The greatest loss, however, is Keene Fitzpatrick, the popular and efficient trainer, who has just accepted an offer from Yale, and will henceforth fill 'Mike' Murphy's place there. This loss is irreparable in the opinion of the Michigan men, for 'Fitz' has always been the prime factor in building up the teams for the past years, and had the confidence and esteem of every student.

=== Return to Yale: 1896–1898 ===
Fitzpatrick returned to Yale from 1896 to 1897 as the trainer of the school's track and football teams. For the second time, Fitzpatrick was hired to replace his old Natick teammate Mike Murphy, this time as Yale's trainer. In September 1896, one newspaper describe his hiring this way:

Keene Fitzpatrick ... has just signed a contract to train Yale's track team for one year. ... In his younger days he won fame as a sprinter of great ability. He is a personal friend of Murphy and one of his pupils. ... Fitzpatrick will have charge of the other teams also, and will report Sept. 18, when the football squad will begin active training at the Yale field. ... It is reported that the salary will be the same as that paid to Murphy, $1,500.

Fitzpatrick was described elsewhere as "a thoroughly good man who knows all about track and field athletics", but also "energetically devoted" to football—unlike many trainers who are "jealous of football" due to its damaging impact on "finely tempered men".

=== Invention of new pole-vaulting technique ===
While at Yale, Fitzpatrick proved himself to be an innovator in track and field by inventing a new pole-vaulting technique. Dr. R.G. Clapp, who later spent 40 years as an athletic trainer and coach at the University of Nebraska, trained as a pole vaulter under Fitzpatrick in 1897. Clapp recalled that Fitzpatrick came to Yale with a "new idea on gripping the pole". Fitzpatrick "advocated sliding the lower hand up the pole to meet the upper hand at the takeoff instead of the prevailing system of taking off with the hands spread." Clapp was the first pole-vaulter to take up Fitzpatrick's suggestion, and the two worked together on coordinating the other essentials of the vault with the hand slide. In 1898, after perfecting the technique, Clapp set a world record in the pole-vault (11 feet, 10½ inches) that stood for six years. Clapp later wrote:

Credit should be given where credit is due and, while it is true that Keene Fitzpatrick and I were jointly responsible for this development which revolutionized valuting, the major credit should go to that polished Irish gentleman, who was one of the finest sportsmen I have ever known and who was so highly regarded at University of Michigan, Yale, and Princeton universities and by all of the track coaches and athletes of yesteryears.

== University of Michigan ==
=== Return to Michigan in 1898 ===
During the two seasons that Fitzpatrick was at Yale, Michigan lost both games to its then rival University of Chicago. When Charles A. Baird was hired as Michigan's first athletic director in 1898, his first act was to recruit Fitzpatrick to return to Michigan.

Fitzpatrick agreed to re-join Baird, who had been the manager of the 1894 and 1895 teams trained by Fitzpatrick. On September 15, 1898, one week before moving to Ann Arbor, Fitzpatrick was married to Mary Quinlan in Natick, Massachusetts.

In Fitzpatrick's first season back at Michigan, the football team went 10–0 and won the school's first Western Conference (now known as the Big Ten Conference) championship. The team outscored its opponents 205 to 26, and closed the season with a 12–11 win over Chicago. Fitzpatrick was credited for the team's turn-around in 1898. One writer recalled how "sadly out of condition" the Michigan team had been in 1897 when it lost to Chicago and earlier in 1898 when it narrowly beat Northwestern. "Then after Fitzpatrick worked with these men they approached the Thanksgiving day contest with Chicago strong and fit to beat any team in the west. Physical condition improved 100 per cent."

During the 1898 football season, Fitzpatrick received a bruise on the back and "thought nothing of it" until an "ugly abscess" developed on his back. An operation was performed by a Detroit physician, but after two weeks, his condition deteriorated, and he returned to Massachusetts where he underwent a second surgery at Massachusetts General Hospital in Boston. In late January 1899, he remained seriously ill at the Massachusetts hospital, though he was able to return in time for the 1899 track season.

=== Yost's point-a-minute teams ===
In 1901, Michigan hired Fielding H. Yost as its football coach, and Fitzpatrick worked closely with Yost as trainer of the football team over the next nine years. In Yost's first four seasons at Michigan, the team was 44–0–1, outscoring opponents 2,331–40. The Michigan teams from 1901 to 1905, known as the "Point-a-Minute" teams, played 56 consecutive games without a loss and outscored their opponents 2,821 to 42. Michigan football drew widespread press attention, and though the lion's share of the credit went to Yost, much praise was also paid to Fitzpatrick for his role in training Michigan's players.

In 1903, Fitzpatrick was recognized as a trainer "without peers in the country" and was paid a salary of $3,000 per year. The Los Angeles Times reported that Michigan's athletic director (Baird), football coach (Yost) and trainer (Fitzpatrick) were collectively paid $10,250, an amount "over double that of United States Senators", but noted that each was "conceded to be worth all he gets." The Times said the following about Fitzpatrick:

Trainer Keene Fitzpatrick, the 'Professor of Athletics,' is also recognized as without a superior in his line, which is the education of the young idea in the cinder path of track athletics, jumping, pole vaulting, and work with the weights. In all these branches Michigan ranked high last year, and to Fitzpatrick was given most of the credit.

Fitzpatrick's training was often credited as the reason why so few Michigan football players were injured during his years as trainer. Michigan's legendary football coach Fielding H. Yost held a high opinion of Fitzpatrick and praised his role in the success of Michigan's football teams:

Fitz and I worked together for nine years. We were like brothers during that association at Michigan. There is no one person who contributed so much to the University of Michigan as this great trainer. His wonderful personality, his expert assistance and that great optimism of his stood out as his leading qualifications. My association with him is one of the pleasantest recollections of my life. He put men in shape, trained them and developed them. They were 'usable' all the time. He is a trainer who has his men in the finest mental condition possible. I don't think there was ever a trainer who kept men more fit, physically and mentally, than Keene Fitzpatrick.

During the 1903 season, Fitzpatrick also played a central role in the birth of the Little Brown Jug trophy that is still awarded to the winner of the Michigan-Minnesota football game. The student manager of the 1903 Michigan team, Tommy Roberts, recalled the origin of the jug as follows: "Trainer Keene Fitzpatrick was afraid Minnesota would try to dope Michigan's water supply, and bought the jug for about 30 cents in a Minneapolis store."

=== Track success at Michigan ===
==== Western Conference championships ====
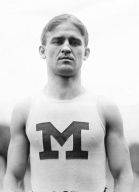
Fitzpatrick pupil, Archie Hahn, won three gold medals at the 1904 Summer Olympics in Paris.

Fitzpatrick was Michigan's track coach from 1900 to 1910, and during those years, Fitzpatrick's teams compiled a 24–2–1 record in dual meets and won Western Conference track championships in 1900, 1901, 1902, 1903, 1904, and 1906.

Fitzpatrick's athletes also excelled in Olympic competition. Over the course of four Olympic Games held during his tenure as track coach, Michigan track and field athletes won 15 medals, including 7 gold medals.

==== 1900 Paris Olympics ====
In 1900, funds were solicited from faculty, students, alumni and Ann Arbor businessmen to send Fitzpatrick and four Michigan track athletes to the Olympics in Paris. Michigan's John McLean won a silver medal in the high hurdles, and Michigan's champion pole-vaulter, Charles Dvorak, became involved in the Sabbath controversy. When finals of some events were scheduled for Sunday, several American university teams agreed they could not violate the Sabbath. Among the finals scheduled for Sunday was the pole vault, in which Dvorak was a favorite. Dvorak was reportedly told that the final had been rescheduled, but the event was held after Dvorak and another American left. Several special competitions were conducted later to accommodate the Americans, which allowed Dvorak to win a silver medal.

On his return from Paris, Fitzpatrick praised the American athletes and criticized Paris officials for holding key event finals on a Sunday:

"The Americans showed themselves superior in every kind of track athletics. They won practically everything. We felt keenly the breach of faith in holding the Paris games on Sunday, but we could do nothing more than [sic?] make a formal protest."

==== 1904 Olympics in St. Louis ====
One of the highlights for Michigan athletics during the Fitzpatrick years came at the 1904 Summer Olympics in St. Louis, Missouri, which have sometimes been referred to as the "Michigan Olympics." Five University of Michigan track and field athletes won 9 medals: six gold, two silver, and one bronze. The Michigan medal winners at the 1904 Olympics were:

- Archie Hahn – gold medals in the 60 meters, 100 meters, and 200 meters;
- Ralph Rose – gold medal in the shot put, silver medal in the discus, and bronze medal in the hammer throw;
- Charles Dvorak – gold medal in the pole vault;
- Fred Schule – gold medal in the 110-meter hurdles; and
- Wesley Coe – silver medal in the shot put.

Archie Hahn became a major star, and Fitzpatrick was credited with inventing his unusual running style. Shortly before the 1904 Olympics, a Wisconsin sports writer described the Fitzpatrick-invented style this way:

Hahn has a new style of running. Nobody at Michigan understands the style, except that Keene Fitzpatrick invented it, and that Hahn steps differently than ever before. Even to see Hahn's new stride is not to analyze how he manages to lift his feet so high in front. The new stride suggests that he is trying to climb a hill. The little man has toughened every muscle in his body and trained it to be a spring.

With three medals, Ralph Rose also became a star. In December 1904, the New York Evening Sun wrote that Rose was "the first perfect physique ever seen at the University of Michigan" as measured by Fitzpatrick's anthropometric charts. Before Rose, Michigan never had an athlete who did not fall short of either size or symmetry requirements to draw "an uncurving line on the cart at the 100 mark." At 6 foot, 3 inches, 246 pounds, a 29.9 inch right thigh, and a 47.6 inch expanded chest, he was the school's first "perfect physique".

==== 1906 and 1909 Olympics ====
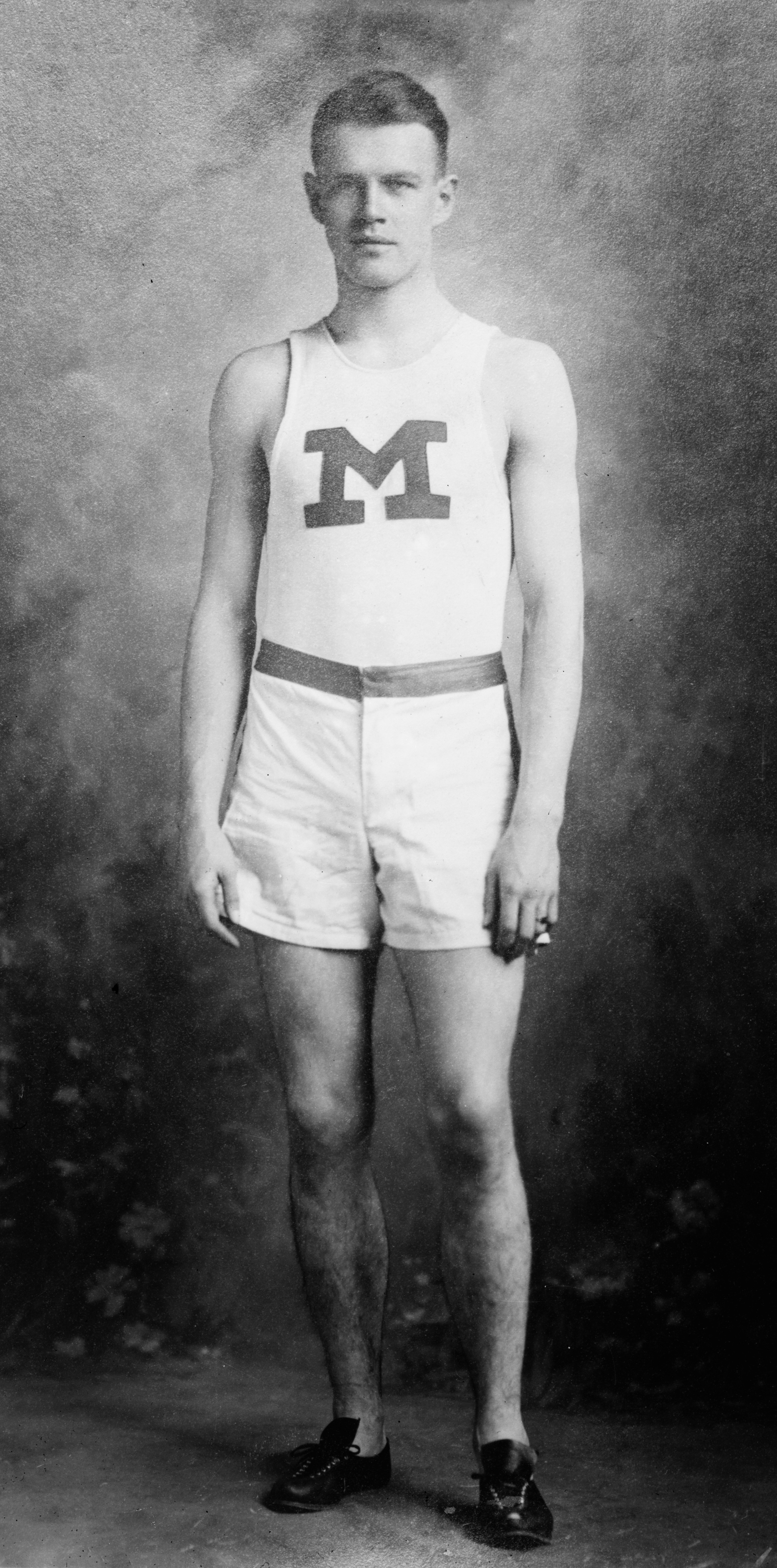
Fitzpatrick said Ralph Craig was the best sprinter he ever turned out.

At the 1906 Summer Olympics in Athens, Archie Hahn repeated as the 100-meter champion, winning his fourth gold medal. And at the 1908 Summer Olympics in London, Michigan athlete Ralph Rose repeated as the gold medalist in the shot put, and John Garrels won a silver medal in the 110-meter hurdles and a bronze in the shot put.

==== Ralph Craig ====
Fitzpatrick also coached Ralph Craig at Michigan. Following Fitzpatrick's departure from Michigan, Craig went on to win gold medals in the 100 metres and 200 metres at the 1912 Olympics in Stockholm. In 1932, Fitzpatrick said that Craig was the best sprinter he ever turned out, though Johnny Garrels was the best all-around athlete he ever handled. Fitzpatrick's pupils, Hahn and Craig, were the only Olympic double sprint winners prior to another Michigan athlete, Eddie Tolan, accomplishing the feat at the 1932 Summer Olympics.

=== Gymnasium director and advocate for "physical culture" ===
In addition to serving as the trainer for the football team and coach of the track team, Fitzpatrick also served as a professor of physical training and the director of the school's Waterman Gymnasium. He was first hired at Michigan in 1894, the same year the Waterman Gymnasium was opened. Gymnasium training was compulsory for Michigan students at the time, and it was Fitzpatrick who oversaw the training. The gymnasium training included "muscular strengthening and improvement", exercises (known as "correctives"), basketball, and Swedish gymnastics.

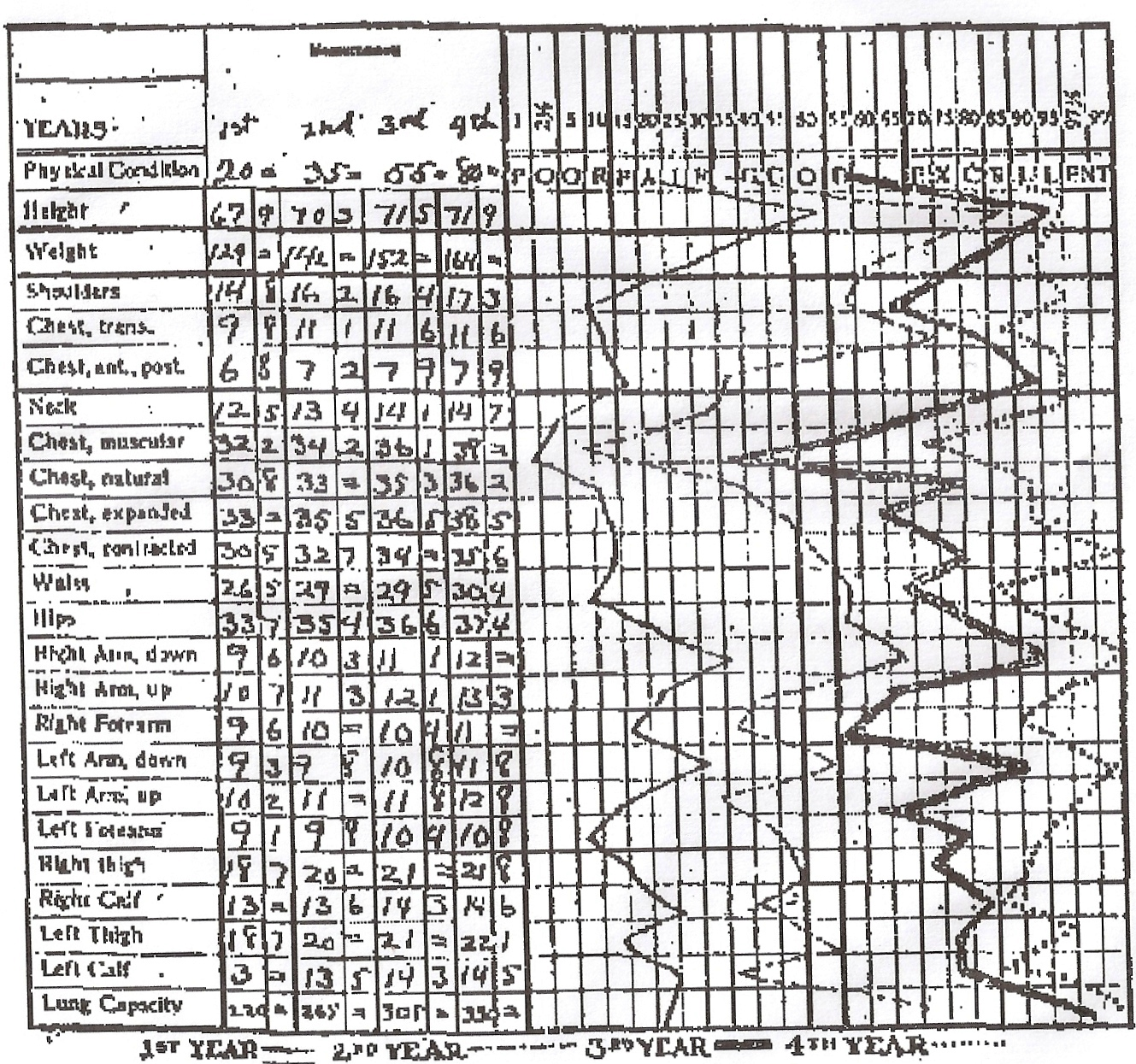
Anthropometric chart used by Fitzpatrick in monitoring Michigan students

During his years at Michigan, Fitzpatrick was an outspoken advocate of vigorous exercise and what was then known as "physical culture". In 1910, a profile of Fitzpatrick's work was published under the headline, "Makes Man Out of Weakling, Chart Shows Wonders of Scientific Physical Training". The article displayed one of the anthropometric charts (pictured) used by Fitzpatrick in tracking the progress of Michigan's students, including measurements of lung capacity, weight, shoulders, neck, chest, hips, waist, thighs, forearms, and arms. The article touted Fitzpatrick's work as evidence that "scientific physical culture" can turn "a poor weed into a splendidly developed man."

Fitzpatrick was also an advocate of a healthy diet. In 1909, he wrote: "Diet takes a foremost part in the training of athletes. Men in training should not eat anything fried, pastry, pork sausages, etc. ... Tea and coffee, smoking and drinking intoxicating liquors must be absolutely barred from an athlete's diet."

In another article, Fitzpatrick told of his work with a student who had been "horribly crippled" from birth. The student asked to be excused from the compulsory gymnasium work, claiming it would be "utterly impossible" for him to participate. The student had never walked a step, his legs were twisted out of shape, and he could not control his head and neck. Fitzpatrick denied the request and promised the young man: "I will teach you to walk." Fitzpatrick invented exercises to strengthen every part of the student's body, until eventually the student could walk on his own. Fitzpatrick recalled:

Day after day I taught him. I showed him how to step and helped him with my hands to take steps. The first two steps he took alone were followed by tears of joy. Of course, he'll never be able to walk as an able-bodied man, but he learned to discard his shuffle. ... This is but an instance of gymnasium work's benefits. If people realized the value of physical culture, we would be a splendidly developed race of men and women.

Those who knew Fitzpatrick described his "magnetic personality", his ability to rouse men "out of the gloom of despair and defeat", and noted that "he knew men and how to get the best out of them."

=== Fitzpatrick's accomplishments draw fame and offers from Eastern universities ===
By 1905, the success of Michigan's athletic programs had brought fame to Fitzpatrick and to the school. Fitzpatrick had "turned out more championship teams than any other man in the West", and the school's "athletic reputation had spread so far" that requests were received from all over the country from school's seeking to hire Michigan graduates to teach athletics. Fitzpatrick noted that the demand was so great that a Michigan athlete could command $400 to $500 more a year in salary than students from other schools, and an All-Western player from Michigan's football team could command a salary of $1,500 for three months' work. In what one newspaper called "Fitzpatrick's call to the book worms", Fitzpatrick extended an offer even to students without the ability to make the big teams that he would "teach them all the tricks by which they can show other men to success on the cinder path and gridiron."

In 1905, Yale sought to recruit Fitzpatrick to return once again to that school. At the time, one paper wrote: "It is no exaggeration to say that today Fitzpatrick stands head and shoulders over every trainer in the country, just as Yost outshines rival football coaches. And without Fitzpatrick, Yost could not produce the winning football teams he does." A team from Yale visited Fitzpatrick in June 1905 but left Ann Arbor with the report that it was "impossible to get Keene away from Michigan." It was said: "Keene is located there, with everything pleasant and just as he wants it, and they say they won't let him go and he says he can't come. So Yale must give up hoping for him." Fitzpatrick declined to comment on the offers and said, "Ann Arbor is a good place to live in and I like the Michigan spirit."

Fitzpatrick's reputation as one of the greatest trainers and conditioners continued to grow as his four-mile-relay team won the event at the Penn relays for seven consecutive years. And in January 1910 a Minnesota newspaper wrote a lengthy profile on Fitzpatrick describing him as the "great little man" responsible for molding Michigan's teams:

A great asset to Michigan is Keene Fitzpatrick. He knows athletics from A to Z. As a trainer of track men he is beyond a peer; for keeping football players in condition he is unbeatable and in the capacity of a football coach he ranks high. He works over an unconscious player, binds up a nasty hurt or squeezes a soaked sponge down the neck of a perspiring husky with the same calmness that he looks for dangerous stones in the training lot at Whitmore Lake.

Fitzpatrick's conditioning was credited with the success of the Michigan football team in his two games at the team's trainer. On November 13, 1900, Michigan beat Penn, 12–6, after a long train ride to Philadelphia. On a hot day in Philadelphia, Penn's coach was forced to make nine substitutions, but Michigan made only one. Seven days later, after long train rides to Ann Arbor, and then to Minnesota, the Michigan football team beat Minnesota, 15–6, in the bitter cold. One writer of the victories: "It was a test that is seldom paralleled in football, but Fitzpatrick had the men in shape to stand it—and then a whole lot."

=== Fitzpatrick accepts an $8,000 a year offer from Princeton ===
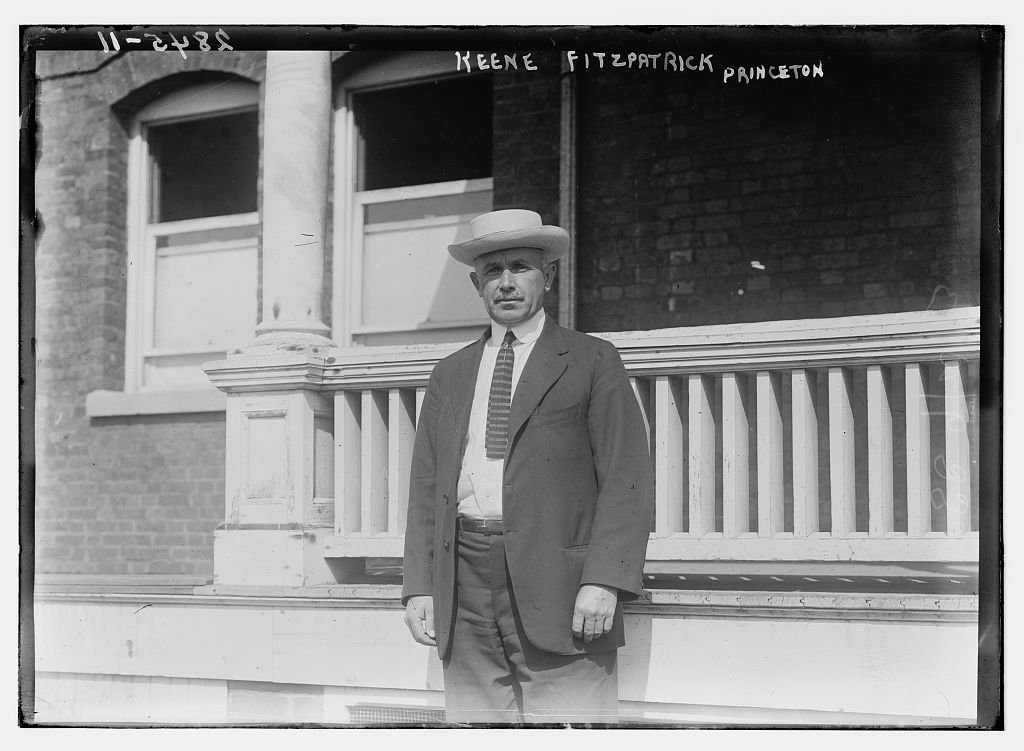
Fitzpatrick at Princeton in 1913

In 1910, Fitzpatrick was offered the position of athletic trainer and track coach by Princeton University. Fitzpatrick stated that he was content in Michigan, but Princeton representative persisted and asked him to name the salary that would cause him to leave Michigan. Fitzpatrick did not want to leave Michigan so he gave the figure "in the neighborhood of $8,000 per year"—an amount he assumed would be prohibitive. Princeton agreed to the amount, and Fitzpatrick, "having made the terms himself felt in honor bound to leave Michigan and come East."

Fitzpatrick's impact on the student body was such that, when he left for Princeton in 1910, the following tribute was paid to him:

He made men better, not alone physically, but morally. His work has been uplifting along all lines of university activities. In character and example he is as great and untiring as in his teaching and precept. ... Next to President Angell, no man of the University of Michigan, in the last ten years, has exerted a more wholesome influence upon the students than Keene Fitzpatrick. His work brought him in close touch with the students and his influence over them for good has been wonderful. He is a man of ideals and clean life.

In the decade after Fitzpatrick left, Michigan's football teams did not play to the same level they had in the nine years that Yost and Fitzpatrick had worked together. In 1915, one paper noted that Fitzpatrick's departure "left a gap in the circle which has never been properly filled." In nine years under Yost-Fitzpatrick, the Michigan football team had a record of 75–6–2 (.903 winning percentage), and outscored opponents, 3,248–193. In the ten years after Fitzpatrick left, Yost's teams went 52–18–6, a .684 winning percentage.

== Princeton University ==
Fitzpatrick was hired by Princeton in 1910 and remained the track coach and athletic trainer there for 22 years. Four of his Princeton track teams placed second in the intercollegiates—1920, 1922, 1923, and 1925. Fifteen of his track athletes from Princeton won individual intercollegiate championships, including two double champions, Charles R. Erdman and Randolph E. Brown, and two repeat champions, J. Coard Taylor and Ralph G. Hills.

After his first year at Princeton, the Daily Princetonian published an editorial in November 1911 proclaiming Fitzpatrick as "the best trainer Princeton has ever had", and concluded, "if we were asked to name the man who had done most for Princeton athletics in general during the past year, we should name Keene Fitzpatrick, the trainer of a championship football team, the trainer of a championship baseball team and the coach of the first Princeton track team that has beaten Yale in fifteen years."

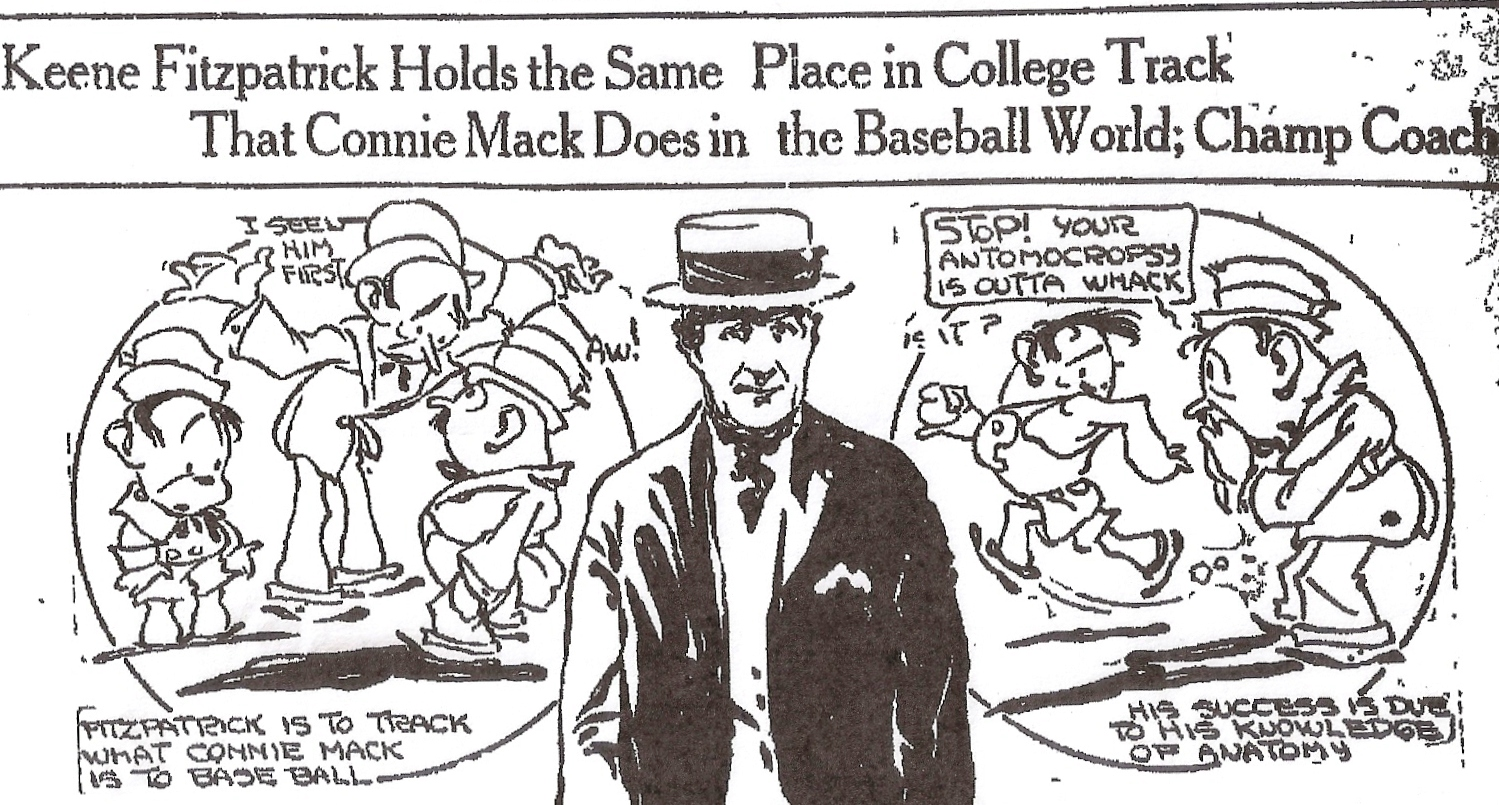
Illustrations from 1922 newspaper profile on Fitzpatrick

In 1918, collegiate track coaches formed the Association of College Track Coaches of American and elected Fitzpatrick as their first president.

By 1919, Fitzpatrick had been a track coach for 30 years and was known as the "Dean of College Coaches". A columnist that year observed: "Princeton has learned to love Fitzpatrick just as much as it does the members of the famous Poe family, Sam White and others who have brought glory to the Jungletown institution. He has built up the athletic department, just as he had done at Michigan..." In 1921, another writer noted: "His success in coaching in all branches of sport makes him one of the greatest athletic instructors of all time."

In 1922, syndicated sports columnist Billy Evans wrote a profile about Fitzpatrick that was published in newspapers across the United States. Evans compared Fitzpatrick to Connie Mack:

In collegiate track athletics Keene Fitzpatrick occupies much the same place that Connie Mack holds in major league baseball. Fitzpatrick stands out as one of the greatest developers of college athletics in the history of the track sport. ... Much of Fitzpatrick's success is due to his knowledge of the anatomy. He is a great conditioner.

In 1927, Fitzpatrick spoke publicly in favor of allowing college football teams to conduct early practice before the school year began. He argued that the lack of sufficient time for training and conditioning was the greatest cause of football injuries. He argued that, although football is the most strenuous of all sports, it gets the least amount of actual preparation. In 1928, U.S. Senator Royal S. Copeland joined in Fitzpatrick's call for "systematic training". Copeland credited Fitzpatrick with doing "more to develop straight thinking than any college president of modern times."

== Retirement and tributes ==
In 1932, Fitzpatrick retired after 42 years in the business as an athletic trainer and coach. Fitzpatrick, who was 67 years old at the time, noted that he sought to retire to a "less strenuous mode of life". At the time of Fitzpatrick's resignation, the chairman of Princeton's board and supervisor of sports said, "For 22 years Mr. Fitzpatrick has been to Princeton men the symbol of all that is fine in amateur sport."

Columnist Walter S. Trumbull wrote that Fitzpatrick "is known, admired and respected wherever a football shoe has trod or a running spike has pressed." At the dedication of the Michigan Union in 1935, former University of Michigan athletic director Charles A. Baird said, "I often think that if I were asked to produce a live, flesh-and-blood specimen of the perfect gentleman, I would unhesitatingly select Keene Fitzpatrick. He was indeed a super-coach."

Famed sports writer Grantland Rice regularly sought out Fitzpatrick on questions involving track and field, referring to Fitzpatrick in his columns as "the oracle" and "one of Natick's immortals". Even after Fitzpatrick died, Rice continued to write about his old friend, calling Fitzpatrick a man who "could coach and train football, track, rowing and the art of living." Rice recalled that one of the most common topics of discussion with Fitzpatrick was "this matter of weight and age". Fitzpatrick believed that a man of 50 or 60 should keep his weight close to what it was at 25 or 30. Fitzpatrick claimed he had never missed a day's work and was never out of condition. In 44 years, Fitzpatrick was never more than two pounds away from 164 pounds. Even at age 60, Fitzpatrick claimed he could outrun many of his students who came back to school "overweight and soft from a summer that certainly wasn't devoted to keeping in condition."

As a tribute to his years of service, Princeton named an athletic field and fieldhouse after him.

== Later years and death ==
Fitzpatrick continued to live in Princeton, New Jersey after his retirement. He died at his home in Princeton in 1944 after a long illness.

== Head coaching record ==
=== Football ===
Year	Team	Overall	Conference	Standing	Bowl/playoffs
Princeton Tigers (Independent) (1917–1918)
1917	Princeton	2–0			
1918	Princeton	3–0			
Princeton:		5–0			
Total:		5–0			

Preceded by Edward Moulton	Michigan Wolverines football trainer 1894–1895	Succeeded by James Robinson
Preceded by Tom Cox	Michigan Wolverines football trainer 1898, 1900–1909	Succeeded by Alvin Kraenzlein
