= Mike Murphy (trainer and coach) =

American athletic trainer and coach (1860–1913)

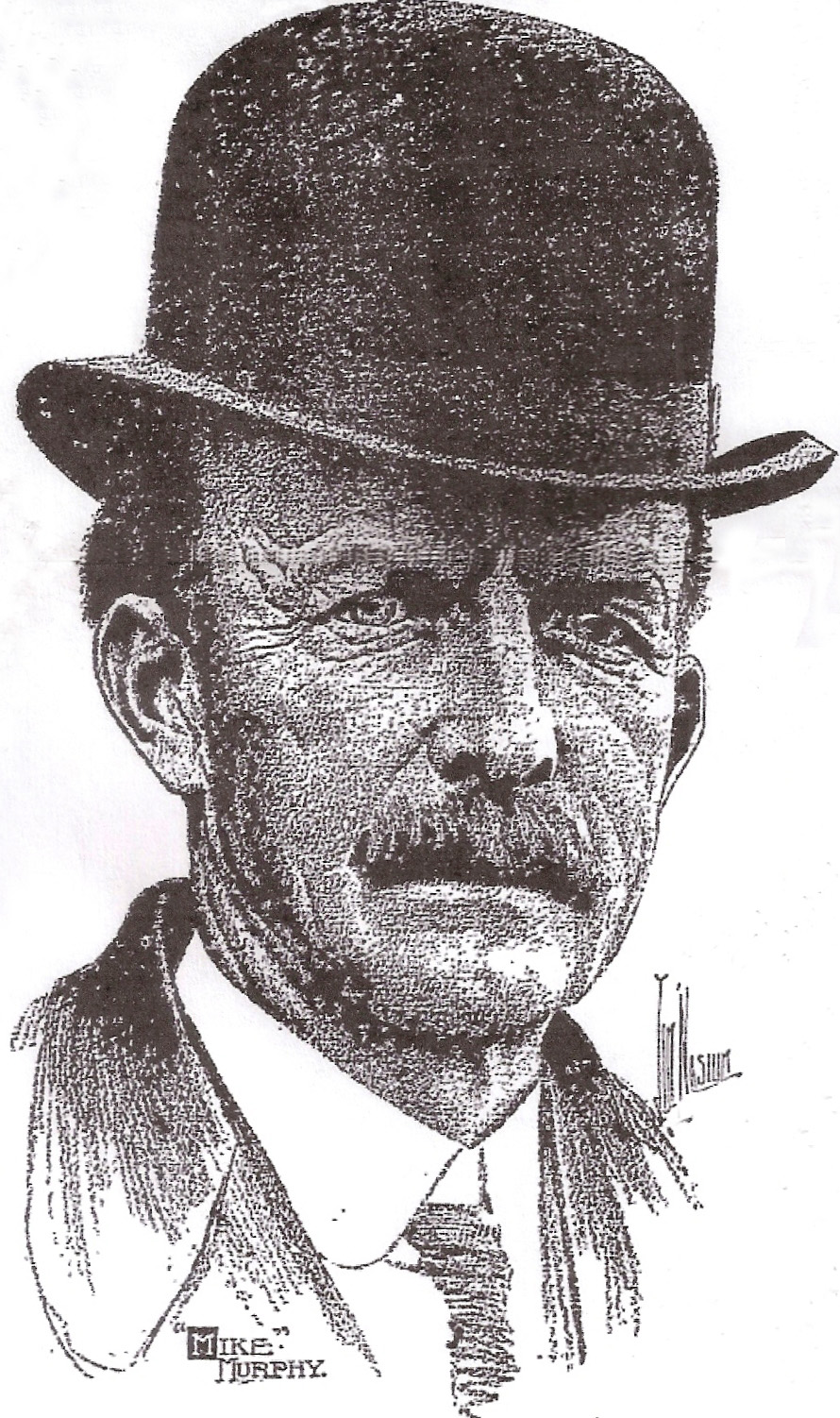
- Mike Murphy, illustration from 1913 obituary in The Philadelphia Inquirer
- Born: Michael Charles Murphy; February 26, 1860; Southboroor Westboro, MA.
- Died: June 4, 1913 (aged 53); Philadelphia, PA, U.S.
- Occupations: Track, Football Coach, Trainer
- Years active: 1886–1913
- Spouse: Nora Long (m. 1892)
- Children: 3, including Senator George Murphy

Michael Charles Murphy (February 26, 1860 – June 4, 1913) was an American athletic trainer and coach at Yale University (1887–1889, 1892–1896, 1901–1905), Detroit Athletic Club (1889–1892), University of Michigan (1891), Villanova University (1894), University of Pennsylvania (1896–1901, 1905–1913), and the New York Athletic Club (1890–1900). He coached the American track athletes at the Summer Olympics in 1900, 1908, and 1912. He spent a year in approximately 1884 as the trainer of heavyweight boxing champion John L. Sullivan.

The Washington Post in 1913 called Murphy "the father of American track athletics." He was considered the premier athletic trainer of his era and was said to have "revolutionized the methods of training athletes and reduced it to a science." He is credited with establishing many innovative techniques for track and field, including the crouching start for sprinters.

== Early years ==
Accounts concerning Murphy's youth differ. He was born in February 1860 either in Southboro, Westboro or Natick, Massachusetts. He was the son of Irish immigrants, a man "of humble birth and scant education." Murphy's father had a reputation as an athlete, and Murphy's desire as a youth was to become a great athlete. He has been variously reported to have traveled the country participating in "six-day races" at the age of 20 and to have been a boxer and a minor league baseball player. Some accounts state that he was part of the world's champion Natick Hook and Ladder racing team of the early 1880s with Keene Fitzpatrick, Steve Farrell, Pooch Donovan, Piper Donovan, Johnny Mack and Sid Peet. According to his obituary in The Philadelphia Inquirer, "his ambition was to stand out prominently as a six-day pedestrian and at the age of eighteen he was out in the world trying to win fame and fortune on the tan bark track." Then, "after several years of grueling running indoors without anything but glory, Murphy branched out as a sprinter and baseball player."

At least one published report states that Murphy "was himself one of the greatest professional sprinters this country ever saw." Other accounts indicate that he never achieved great success as an athlete. A friend of Murphy, Pat Hurley, recalled that Murphy's days as a trainer began when Mike Finn, the fleetest professional sprinter in New England, received a letter from New Haven asking him to act as a trainer there. Finn reportedly joked to a group of athletes, "Let's send 'Stocky' Murphy." Because Murphy was not a champion among them, Finn's comments brought a "round of jeers." But Finn continued, "Never mind that, that fellow has a head on him that will get him more some day than our legs will." A Philadelphia sports writer later noted the "irony of fate" that Murphy had the talent to develop athletic prodigies though "nature did not deign to bless him with even an average physique." That writer described Murphy when they first met in 1895 as "a small, spare, even delicate-looking man, dressed in a plain suit."

== Detroit Athletic Club ==
As Yale gained supremacy in athletics, Murphy's fame spread, and in the fall of 1889, the Detroit Athletic Club hired him as the physical director and athletic coach for its members. Murphy remained in Detroit for three years, and while there, he developed a reputation for having a "sixth sense" in being able to spot athletic talent. His first discovery in Detroit was John Owen who went on to become the fastest sprinter in America. One newspaper account described Murphy's discovery of Owen as follows:

John Owen, a member of the club, was playing tennis one afternoon when Murphy, in his methodical way, leaned over to watch the movements of the players. The action of Owen looked promising to Murphy. "Mr. Owen, why don't you be a sprinter?" he asked while the players were wiping off perspiration between acts. "I?" returned Owen. "Why, I couldn't run a lick." But Murphy insisted, and from that seeming guess work selection of a future great was developed John Owen, the first amateur sprinter to cover one hundred yards under ten seconds. Owen's time was 9-4/5 seconds.

After Owen set the world's record of 9-4/5 seconds in the 100-yard dash, Owen focused his efforts on the 220- and 440-yard events. Murphy told the press in 1891 that he was "confident that Owen will be able to create new records for both these distances next summer." While in Detroit, Murphy also discovered Harry M. Jewett, Owen's successor as America's greatest sprinter. He also coached the father of 1912 sprinting gold medalist, Ralph Craig. When Murphy became ill in 1913, the Detroit Athletic Club presented Murphy with a touring car in gratitude for his service.

== Father of American track athletics ==
=== Fifteen intercollegiate championships with 21 teams ===
In 1892, Murphy returned to Yale where he served as coach and trainer of the track team and trainer of the football team. Over the next 11 years, Murphy moved back-and-forth between Yale (1892–1896, 1901–1905) and the University of Pennsylvania (1896–1901, 1905–1913). After turning Yale into the dominant power in track and field, Murphy brought immediate success to Penn when he moved there in 1896. In his first season at Penn, the school captured the intercollegiate track championship, scoring 34 points to defeat Yale, and finished with 24.5 points. Of the 21 indoor and outdoor track teams coached by Murphy during this time, 15 of them won the intercollegiate championships—eight at Penn and seven at Yale. And on the six occasions when his teams did not finish first, they finished second on four occasions and third and fourth once each. Wherever Murphy went as a coach he put in place a solid back-up team of assistant coaches and rubbers. Over the years these included George Orton, Mike Dee and Jimmy Curran. Many went on to achieve great success coaching college and high school athletics.

For his contributions during these years, The Washington Post in 1913 called Murphy "the father of American track athletics." He was considered "the greatest coach of track men and trainer of men in other branches of sport that America had ever known."

=== Champions trained by Murphy ===
In addition to his success in coaching the Yale and Penn teams to championships, Murphy also developed an unparalleled reputation for finding and training individual champions. Between 1892 and 1900, he reportedly developed nearly every American track champion:

America owes to none other than "Mike" Murphy her winning of the supremacy of track athletics from England, who, twenty years ago, was considered unbeatable on the cinder path. In the eight years intervening between 1892 and 1900, the period in which America made her most gigantic strides in track athletics, "Mike" Murphy developed every champion of the spiked shoe in America except Hollister, of Harvard, and it was these champions developed by him that first put America on the map of the athletic world.

As of 1908, athletes coached by Murphy held 8 of the 14 recognized intercollegiate track and field records, and had also held the records in the pole vault and shot put until 1907.

In addition to his discovery of Owen in Detroit, Murphy's discovery of Maxie Long is another oft-cited example of Murphy's ability to recognize and develop raw talent. Long, who became the country's top quarter-miler, was a bicycle rider when Murphy discovered him. Murphy coaxed him into sprinting, and on seeing Long run his first spring, Murphy reportedly declared, "I have discovered a champion."

Alvin Kraenzlein was another talent developed by Murphy. When Kraenzlein began training with Murphy, he was a hurdler, but not a sprinter. Murphy trained Kraenzlein as a sprinter, and he became a champion the 100-yard dash and won an Olympic gold medal in the 60-yard dash.

=== Olympics ===
Starting in 1890, Murphy also spent 11 consecutive summers coaching many of the country's top athletes at the New York Athletic Club's summer facilities on Travers Island. having led the American athletes to successes in international competitions during the 1890s, Murphy was selected as the coach and trainer of the American teams at the Olympics in 1900, 1908, and 1912.

==== 1900 games in Paris ====
At the 1900 Summer Olympics in Paris, there was no official American team, and several universities sent athletes and coaches to represent the United States. Murphy took 13 Penn athletes and others from the New York Athletic Club to Paris. The U.S. athletes won 16 of the 23 gold medals in track and field, and the Penn Olympians won 11 gold medals, 8 silver and 4 bronze. Murphy's student, Alvin Kraenzlein won four individual gold medals in the 60-meter dash, 110-meter hurdles, 200-meter hurdles, and long jump.

==== 1908 games in London ====
At the 1908 Summer Olympics in London, Murphy was placed in charge of the entire American team, not just his own Penn athletes. On the trip across the Atlantic Ocean, Murphy was always jovial, leading the men in light exercise in which the athletes were "made to feel that it was merely play." Murphy was "the life of the team," keeping the men busy "having fun all the time." On arriving in London, Murphy concluded that "the awful London fog and rain" and the crowd of athletes training at the same hours in the stadium was not ideal. Accordingly, Murphy demanded that the American team be moved to Brighton, England, where there was a "better chance to see the sun." When the team manager demurred about the expense of a move, Murphy insisted that the team would go to Brighton "if I have to pay their way." The American team dominated the track and field competition in London, winning 16 gold medals, with all other countries combined winning the remaining 11 gold medals.

After the American victory in London, newspapers credited Murphy as the man behind the dominance of American track and field athletes. One newspaper account reported:

In an effort to find a reason for the great superiority of American athletes, English sportsmen have finally concluded that this superiority is entirely due to the high development to which the Yankees have brought the science of training. This is better than to acknowledge that the manhood of Great Britain has deteriorated. The American athletes explain it by simply saying "Mike Murphy," for Mike is the kingpin of the profession, and every trainer in American follows as closely as he can the methods of the man who has developed more champions than any other man in the world.

When the American team returned from London, President Theodore Roosevelt hosted them at his Sagamore Hill home on Long Island, and singled out Murphy for special recognition. As U.S. Olympic Committee Chairman James Sullivan introduced Murphy to the President, Roosevelt interrupted: "We don't have to be introduced. I am might glad to see you. He is an American institution; and we are all glad to meet Mike." Upon their return, the American team also presented Murphy with a silver loving cup in gratitude for his efforts.

==== 1912 games in Stockholm ====
By the time of the 1912 Summer Olympics in Stockholm, Murphy was already ill with tuberculosis, and his illness was reported to have "thrown a scare into those interested in the welfare of the American track and field team." He was nevertheless selected as the coach of the American team and accompanied the team to Stockholm with assistance from Lawson Robertson. It was reported that the long trip had an adverse effect on his health, and he died less than a year later. In Stockholm, the Americans again dominated the track and field competition, winning 16 of 32 possible gold medals, and 42 of 94 total medals.

Murphy received principal credit for the dominance of American athletes between the 1890s and the Stockholm Olympics. The praise for Murphy was so great that a backlash developed among westerners who felt that, though many of the country's greatest athletes were coming out of the Midwest, the Eastern establishment sought to heap all of the credit on Murphy. For example, during the 1912 Olympics, the Minneapolis Journal noted that Murphy was not responsible for developing Midwestern stars Jim Thorpe and Ralph Craig and wrote:

They are still at it down East, attempting to grab off the glory for the splendid work of the American athletes in the Olympic games as the personal due of Mike Murphy. ... Mike Murphy is unquestionably a great trainer, but he falls far short of deserving all the credit for the winning of the Olympic games. ... It is an injustice to other less-famed trainers to have their products blandly attributed to Murphy as some of the eastern writers, with their usual provincial complacency, are doing. Murphy is big enough and well enough known by past performances as a trainer to stand upon his own merits without having his misguided friends attempt to seize for him leaves of a bay rightfully belonging to other men.

=== Innovative techniques ===
He was considered the premier athletic trainer of his era and was said to have "revolutionized the methods of training athletes and reduced it to a science." He is credited with establishing many innovative techniques for track and field, including the crouching start for sprinters. He is also credited with being the first man to develop the practice of strapping the tendon with adhesive tape or rubber bandages before competition, and with innovating the use of a mixture of liniment or rubbing oil in treating his athletes.

Murphy also preached the need for a pure mind and body and abolished the old attitude that athletes in training for a physical test required ale and certain stimulants "to give them the vim and make them 'go.'" He also became known for his advocacy of not over-working an athlete during training. In 1895, one of his athletes, Sweeney, set a world record in the high jump. Murphy rested Sweeney for three days before the International Games against England, and Sweeney spent most of his time in bed. When Sweeney arrived at the field on the day of the competition, "he was so full of ginger he could hardly stand still" and set a world record. Another writer emphasized Murphy's recognition in his training regimen that an athlete is a human:

He is the originator of the now generally accepted belief that an athlete is a human. Under his system the old idea of athletes being steamed and worked like mules was banished. Training with weighted shoes or running uphill in rubber boots were old methods that were put into the discard. Light shoes for racing and heavier ones for workout are enough.

He authored two books on track coaching and techniques, Training and College Athletics.

=== Relationship with athletes ===
Murphy was reportedly beloved by the athletes he trained and instilled tremendous loyalty in them. It was reported during Murphy's lifetime that there was "not a man who ever trained under Mike Murphy who wouldn't go to the end of the world for the veteran trainer if he desired it." He reportedly had "some peculiar means of persuasion and development that makes men win." Murphy's "first object was always to get the confidence of a student, which soon developed into a love for the man and his work." The chair of Penn's physical education department once described Murphy's motivational approach as follows:

Mike is a combination of a professor of applied psychology and an evangelist. He possesses the quality peculiar to evangelists of first hypnotizing himself, so great an aid in obtaining control of those to whom he appeals.

Examples of Murphy's close relationships with athletes were many.

In 1905, when Murphy left Yale for the second and final time, some reports indicated it was due to an aristocratic slight to the captain of the football team, Shevlin. Despite a custom at Yale of electing the captain to the elite upper class clubs, Shevlin was not elected because of his lack of social prestige. Murphy was reportedly "disgusted with the growth of aristocratic as opposed to democratic sentiments" at New Haven and did not care to remain there. Others suggested that the real reason for Murphy's move to Penn had more to do with the question of salary, as Penn agreed to pay Murphy a salary of $10,000 per year—more than double the salary then paid to a U.S. Senator.

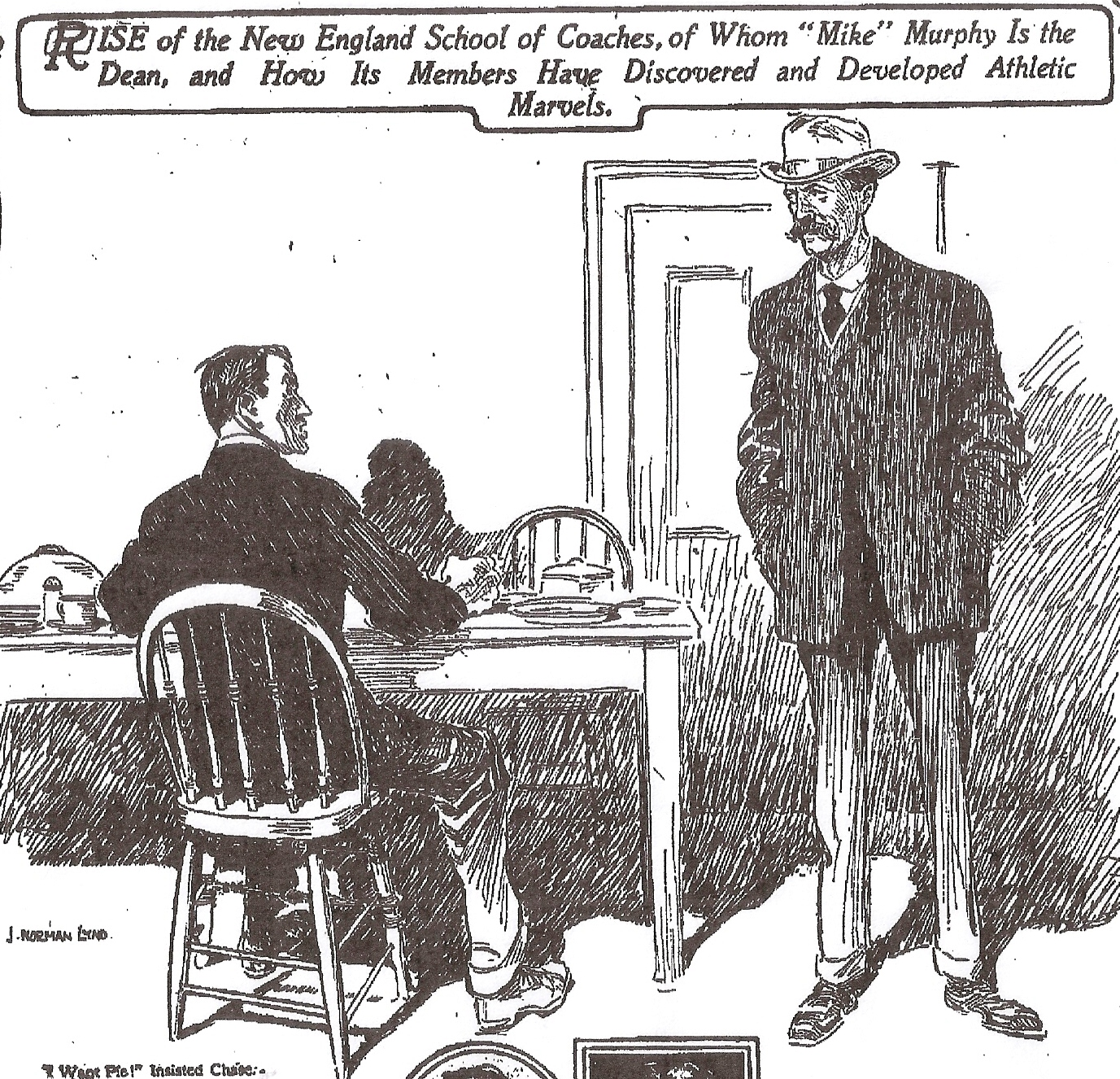
Illustration of Murphy with Dartmouth's Steve Chase pleading for pie

Another popular Murphy story involved Stephen Chase, a leading sprinter from Dartmouth. Chase was sent to work with Murphy at Travers Island in 1895 in preparation for the International Games with England's best athletes. At the evening meal, Chase was disappointed to discover that pie was not to be served at the camp, packed his bags, and placed them on a bus headed to the train station. Realizing that the consumption of pie was part of the training regimen that led Chase to set a world record, Murphy ran to the kitchen, got a large cut of apple pie, and ran down the roadway with "a piece of pie deftly balanced on a plate, all the time calling, 'Here it is Chase. I got it for you.'" According to the story, Chase came back "and was a world beater, and on pie, too."

Murphy was also called the "probably the most picturesque figure in American athletics" and was said to be a "splendid story teller" who delighted his athletes with stories over an open fire or on the training field, telling of his many adventures, including his travels through Canadian lumber camps searching for the next John L. Sullivan. He was reportedly also a lover of chess and literature, especially the works of Honoré de Balzac.

== Deafness ==
Murphy's accomplishments are all the more remarkable as he was deaf. He was known as "Silent Mike" due to his affliction, and contemporary reports state that, though he was deaf, the affliction was not so severe as to prevent him from hearing all remarks. One report in 1905 noted: "It was characteristic of Murphy to encourage the belief that he was very deaf and thus break down the caution of the lads who prided themselves on their ability to outwit the veteran." In 1908, The Washington Post noted that, though Murphy had been "rather deaf" for several years, his deafness had worsened, such that anyone wanting to speak with him "has to shout at the top of his lungs." Murphy joked at the time, "I'm not much of a one to tell secrets to." When he was in Reno in 1910 for the Jack Johnson–James Jeffries fight, Murphy recalled being approached by a woman who went on at length telling him about her marital problems. After she finished, Murphy told her, "Madame, you have come to the right person. Your secrets are safe. I have not heard a word you said."

Murphy suggested that his deafness made him more sympathetic to others and contributed to his success as a handler of men.

== College football ==
Murphy also served as the trainer for the Yale and Penn football teams from 1892 to 1912, and was an integral part of the football program during an era when Yale and Penn were among the top programs in the country. After Murphy's death, a Philadelphia sports editor wrote about Murphy's ability to inspire a football team to superhuman efforts:

He could arouse a team to superhuman efforts as no trainer ever did or perhaps ever will do. He had an oratory peculiarly his own. It was sympathetic, winning, insistent, pleading, the acme of exhortation. The writer once saw him move a red and blue football team to tears between the halves of a great intercollegiate battle when they retired to their dressing room with the score against them and there appeared no reasonable probability of vanquishing their foes. ... The wonderfully magnetic and persuasive powers of the dead trainer were exerted to their utmost ... Murphy's appeal to the Penn players was a masterpiece of its kind. It fired the hearts of that disheartened, discouraged and well-nigh defeated team; it transformed every man into a fighting Titan, a giant who did not know his own strength and ability; it moved every man to tears; it converted an apparent defeat to one of the most glorious triumphs ever witnessed in the records of old Penn's athletic history.

Murphy was football head coach for the University of Michigan in 1891. He later became the first football coach at Villanova University in 1894 where he initiated their program.

Between 1906 and 1908, a movement developed to eliminate football from university sports programs on grounds that it was too brutal and was attracting professionalism to the college campuses. However, Murphy remained a strong supporter of college football. In 1908, he told The Washington Post:

Fellows, show me a man that has gone to college for four years and played on either his varsity or scrub football team and I'll show you a man that'll make good on any job he tackles when he gets out into the world.

However, Murphy was an opponent of brutality and insisted on fair play among his football players. In 1907, when he witnessed one of Penn's players "slug a man," an angry Murphy rushed out on the field and made the offending player leave the field, and required him to apologize before he would be allowed to play football again for Penn.

In 1909, Murphy published a column deploring the ongoing agitation against college football. He responded to charges that it was a brutal sport as follows: "I am not disposed to deny that football is a rough game. But when cleanly played as it is in our big colleges, and when properly safeguarded the element of danger is almost entirely eliminated." In response to proposals to replace football in American universities with either soccer or Canadian rugby, Murphy expressed disdain: "Both of these are jokes when compared to the American game. They lack the science of our football and certainly would not prove very interesting to the spectators." Murphy spoke in favor of removing restrictions on the forward pass, which he viewed as a spectacular play and one that weakens the defense. His main suggestions for eliminating injuries were to abolish the diving tackle, develop better padding, and eliminate the kickoff. With respect to the kickoff, Murphy noted: "I have always felt that it was in the crash of the two teams that most accidents occurred."

=== Head coaching record ===
Year	Team	Overall	Conference	Standing	Bowl/playoffs
Michigan Wolverines (Independent) (1891)
1891	Michigan	4–5			
Michigan:		4–5			
Villanova Wildcats (Independent) (1894)
1894	Villanova	1–0			
Villanova:		1–0			
Total:		5–5			

== Family and death ==
Murphy at 30 married Nora Long, 22 around March, 1892 in Detroit, and the couple had three children. Their child George Murphy, became a well-known movie actor in the 1940s and 1950s and then a U.S. senator from California, serving from 1965 to 1971. Their other son, Charles Thorne Murphy, was a football player at Yale before settling in Detroit.

In June 1913, Murphy died at his home at 4331 Chestnut Street in Philadelphia after a prolonged illness. He reportedly lapsed into unconsciousness after the 1913 Penn track team gathered at his bedside to tell him they had won the 1913 intercollegiate championship. According to some reports, Murphy's illness began when Michigan and Penn played a football game in a blizzard at Ann Arbor, Michigan. From that time on, Murphy was "a sick man, suffering from tuberculosis." Upon his death, the flags at the University of Pennsylvania were lowered to half mast and The Philadelphia Inquirer proclaimed, "Mike Murphy is dead—Long live 'Mike' Murphy." The sports editor of the Philadelphia Public Ledger wrote:

Michael Charles Murphy will never be forgotten. Long after the generations who loved him personally ... have passed away, his name will be written indelibly in the most glorious annals of American's track and field history. His name and fame can never die. He will ever stand as the track wizard of his age, the hero of coaching achievements of his time.

The funeral was held at St. James Catholic Church at 38th and Chestnut Streets in Philadelphia with many of track's greatest athletes serving as his pallbearers.

In 1941, the University of Pennsylvania dedicated Murphy Field House as a tribute to Murphy; the Murphy Field House was destroyed by fire in 1968.

Preceded by First	Michigan Wolverines football trainer 1891	Succeeded by Edward Moulton
