= Andover–Exeter rivalry =

Inter-school rivalry

Exeter–Andover rivalry
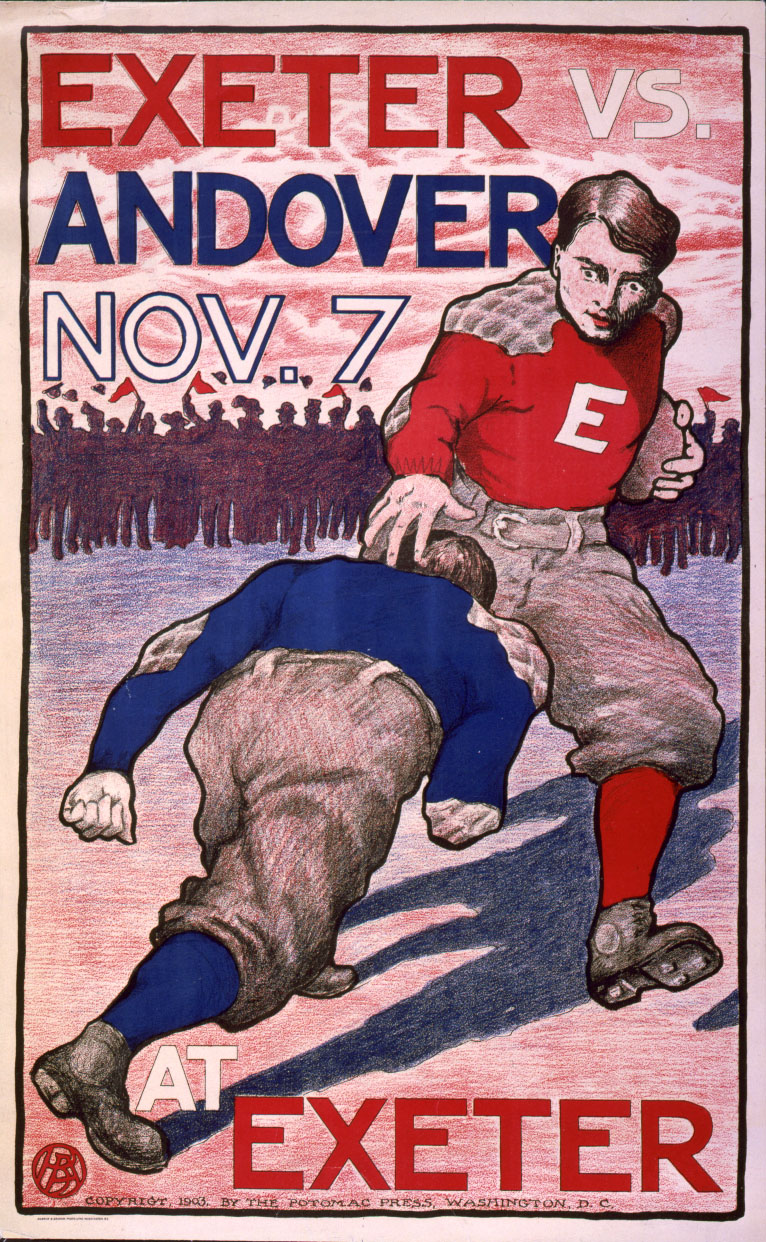
- 1903 poster announcing football game.
- Teams: Andover Big Blue; Exeter Big Red
- First meeting: 1878; Andover 22, Exeter 0
- Latest meeting: 2026; Exeter 56, Andover 21

Statistics
- All-time record: Andover leads, 75–60–10 (.552)
- Largest victory: Exeter, 78–7 (1914)
- Longest win streak: Andover 8 (1905–1912)
- Current win streak: Exeter 6 (2021–present)

The Exeter–Andover rivalry, also known as the Andover–Exeter rivalry, E/a, and A/E, is an athletic rivalry between Phillips Exeter Academy (Exeter) and Phillips Academy (Andover), two New England boarding schools founded by members of the Phillips family during the Revolutionary era. The academies have competed athletically since 1861, and contest the nation's second-oldest high school football rivalry. The two teams have produced nineteen members of the College Football Hall of Fame.

== History ==
=== Background ===
Institutionally, the Exeter-Andover rivalry bears certain similarities to the Harvard–Yale rivalry. Due to religious differences between the two schools (Andover was Calvinist, Exeter Unitarian), they traditionally focused on sending students to Calvinist Yale and Unitarian Harvard, respectively. Since then, the religious distinctions have faded but the academies continue to compete for prestige and prospective students. The two academies have both held the #1 ranking at various points during the 21st century.

According to Andover, the academies have played each other in sports since 1861, although another source asserts that students did not organize Exeter-Andover games until 1865 and the academies did not formally sponsor competition until 1873. The baseball rivalry began when Exeter defeated Andover 11–1 on May 22, 1878; Andover returned the favor 10 days later, beating Exeter 10–8. The following school year, the football series began when Andover beat Exeter 22–0 on November 2, 1878; it is the nation's oldest private school football rivalry. In addition, Andover, Exeter, and Lawrenceville were the first secondary schools to sponsor lacrosse teams, starting in 1882.

=== Football ===
Due to their age and early adoption of organized football, the academies have made extensive contributions to American college football.

Exeter has educated ten members of the College Football Hall of Fame, more than any other high school in the nation. Amos Alonzo Stagg (1885) was one of the first football pioneers at the University of Chicago, back when Chicago played top-level college sports. Six-time national championship-winning coach Howard Jones (1905) attended Exeter for a year after transferring from Ohio's Middletown High School. The other Exonians in the Hall of Fame are four-time All-American Marshall Newell (1890), 1927 national championship-winning coach Tad Jones (1905; Howard's brother), three-time All-American James Hogan (1901), Ed Hart (1907), Eddie Casey (1915), Lee McClung (1888), Jim McCormick (1904), and Donold Lourie (1918).

Andover has also produced several notable football figures, including nine College Football Hall of Famers, such as four-time All-American Frank Hinkey, three-time All-American Eddie Mahan, 1903 national championship-winning coach Art Hillebrand, John Kilpatrick (also a member of the Hockey Hall of Fame), Murray Shelton, Ted Coy, Bob Fisher, Dick Duden, and Belford West. In addition, Andover alumnus William G. Little founded the Alabama Crimson Tide football team, (Note: Although some sources have said that Little attended Exeter, the University of Alabama and Andover itself both say that Little attended Andover.) and longtime New England Patriots head coach Bill Belichick attended Andover for a year.

In addition, an early flashpoint in amateurism rules took place in 1889, when Andover paid a player $200 (roughly $6,800 in 2024 dollars) to play football, and Exeter convinced him to change teams by offering him $300. Most notably, in 1893, Exeter beat Andover after hiring 27-year-old professional athlete Pooch Donovan to play football; the following week, Donovan played college football for Georgetown. In retaliation, Andover stopped playing football with Exeter (even though Andover's quarterback was allegedly a professional himself). After a short-lived attempt to make New Jersey's Lawrenceville School its rival, the schools agreed to play again in 1896. The current head coaches are Panos Voulgaris (Exeter) and Ernie Adams (Andover).

== Football matches ==
| Year | Andover | Exeter | Winner |
|---|---|---|---|
| 1878 | 22 | 0 | Andover |
| 1879 | 0 | 18 | Exeter |
| 1880 | 8 | 8 | Tie |
| 1881 | 6 | 0 | Andover |
| 1882 | 12 | 0 | Andover |
| 1883 | 17 | 6 | Andover |
| 1884 | 11 | 8 | Andover |
| 1885 | 11 | 33 | Exeter |
| 1886 | 0 | 26 | Exeter |
| 1887 | 4 | 44 | Exeter |
| 1888 | 10 | 0 | Andover |
| 1889 | No Game (Note: The 1889 game was canceled as a result of a brawl following a baseball game between the two schools earlier in the year.) | | |
| 1890 | 16 | 0 | Andover |
| 1891 | 26 | 10 | Andover |
| 1892 | 18 | 28 | Exeter |
| 1893 | 10 | 26 | Exeter |
| 1894 | No Game (Note: In late 1893, Andover cut athletic ties with Exeter in a dispute over the eligibility of certain Exeter athletes, in particular star football player Pooch Donovan. Relations were not restored until 1896.) | | |
| 1895 | No Game | | |
| 1896 | 28 | 9 | Andover |
| 1897 | 14 | 18 | Exeter |
| 1898 | 0 | 0 | Tie |
| 1899 | 17 | 0 | Andover |
| 1900 | 0 | 10 | Exeter |
| 1901 | 0 | 5 | Exeter |
| 1902 | 29 | 1 | Andover |
| 1903 | 11 | 14 | Exeter |
| 1904 | 10 | 35 | Exeter |
| 1905 | 28 | 0 | Andover |
| 1906 | 6 | 0 | Andover |
| 1907 | 9 | 6 | Andover |
| 1908 | 12 | 0 | Andover |
| 1909 | 3 | 0 | Andover |
| 1910 | 21 | 0 | Andover |
| 1911 | 23 | 5 | Andover |
| 1912 | 7 | 0 | Andover |
| 1913 | 0 | 59 | Exeter |
| 1914 | 7 | 78 | Exeter |
| 1915 | 7 | 37 | Exeter |
| 1916 | 0 | 6 | Exeter |
| 1917 | 0 | 3 | Exeter |
| 1918 | 7 | 26 | Exeter |
| 1919 | 19 | 0 | Andover |
| 1920 | 6 | 3 | Andover |
| 1921 | 3 | 34 | Exeter |
| 1922 | 3 | 12 | Exeter |
| 1923 | 7 | 7 | Tie |
| 1924 | 0 | 10 | Exeter |

| Year | Andover | Exeter | Winner |
|---|---|---|---|
| 1925 | 0 | 0 | Tie |
| 1926 | 20 | 3 | Andover |
| 1927 | 0 | 0 | Tie |
| 1928 | 18 | 0 | Andover |
| 1929 | 7 | 14 | Exeter |
| 1930 | 20 | 16 | Andover |
| 1931 | 12 | 15 | Exeter |
| 1932 | 0 | 6 | Exeter |
| 1933 | 6 | 7 | Exeter |
| 1934 | 7 | 6 | Andover |
| 1935 | 0 | 7 | Exeter |
| 1936 | 12 | 7 | Andover |
| 1937 | 20 | 15 | Andover |
| 1938 | 14 | 6 | Andover |
| 1939 | 6 | 12 | Exeter |
| 1940 | 2 | 20 | Exeter |
| 1941 | 14 | 13 | Andover |
| 1942 | 12 | 0 | Andover |
| 1943 | 6 | 12 | Exeter |
| 1944 | 20 | 0 | Andover |
| 1945 | 18 | 7 | Andover |
| 1946 | 7 | 6 | Andover |
| 1947 | 6 | 12 | Exeter |
| 1948 | 28 | 7 | Andover |
| 1949 | 34 | 21 | Andover |
| 1950 | 6 | 27 | Exeter |
| 1951 | 7 | 7 | Tie |
| 1952 | 59 | 0 | Andover |
| 1953 | 14 | 7 | Andover |
| 1954 | 31 | 6 | Andover |
| 1955 | 14 | 12 | Andover |
| 1956 | 6 | 45 | Exeter |
| 1957 | 45 | 6 | Andover |
| 1958 | 40 | 6 | Andover |
| 1959 | 16 | 6 | Andover |
| 1960 | 18 | 18 | Tie |
| 1961 | 18 | 8 | Andover |
| 1962 | 6 | 6 | Tie |
| 1963 | 8 | 9 | Exeter |
| 1964 | 7 | 31 | Exeter |
| 1965 | 0 | 8 | Exeter |
| 1966 | 6 | 26 | Exeter |
| 1967 | 20 | 6 | Andover |
| 1968 | 12 | 22 | Exeter |
| 1969 | 27 | 0 | Andover |
| 1970 | 34 | 8 | Andover |
| 1971 | 20 | 30 | Exeter |

| Year | Andover | Exeter | Winner |
|---|---|---|---|
| 1972 | 19 | 6 | Andover |
| 1973 | 32 | 0 | Andover |
| 1974 | 7 | 28 | Exeter |
| 1975 | 33 | 20 | Andover |
| 1976 | 0 | 15 | Exeter |
| 1977 | 28 | 6 | Andover |
| 1978 | 8 | 14 | Exeter |
| 1979 | 24 | 7 | Andover |
| 1980 | 14 | 6 | Andover |
| 1981 | 7 | 12 | Exeter |
| 1982 | 17 | 6 | Andover |
| 1983 | 28 | 6 | Andover |
| 1984 | 12 | 26 | Exeter |
| 1985 | 7 | 21 | Exeter |
| 1986 | 0 | 15 | Exeter |
| 1987 | 14 | 13 | Andover |
| 1988 | 21 | 12 | Andover |
| 1989 | 14 | 12 | Andover |
| 1990 | 16 | 0 | Andover |
| 1991 | 33 | 14 | Andover |
| 1992 | 6 | 0 | Andover |
| 1993 | 21 | 28 | Exeter |
| 1994 | 20 | 20 | Tie |
| 1995 | 6 | 3 | Andover |
| 1996 | 3 | 0 | Andover |
| 1997 | 35 | 0 | Andover |
| 1998 | 7 | 12 | Exeter |
| 1999 | 19 | 7 | Andover |
| 2000 | 6 | 13 | Exeter |
| 2001 | 48 | 15 | Andover |
| 2002 | 14 | 14 | Tie |
| 2003 | 0 | 44 | Exeter |
| 2004 | 12 | 28 | Exeter |
| 2005 | 24 | 8 | Andover |
| 2006 | 43 | 14 | Andover |
| 2007 | 24 | 14 | Andover |
| 2008 | 13 | 21 | Exeter |
| 2009 | 14 | 31 | Exeter |
| 2010 | 33 | 56 | Exeter |
| 2011 | 6 | 39 | Exeter |
| 2012 | 9 | 35 | Exeter |
| 2013 | 13 | 12 | Andover |
| 2014 | 13 | 12 | Andover |
| 2015 | 29 | 14 | Andover |
| 2016 | 16 | 7 | Andover |
| 2017 | 17 | 14 | Andover |
| 2018 | 14 | 0 | Andover |

| Year | Andover | Exeter | Winner |
|---|---|---|---|
| 2019 | 14 | 13 | Andover |
| 2020 | No Game (Note: Canceled because of the COVID-19 pandemic.) | | |
| 2021 | 6 | 37 | Exeter |
| 2022 | 7 | 42 | Exeter |
| 2023 | 20 | 47 | Exeter |
| 2024 | 21 | 42 | Exeter |
| 2025 | 16 | 48 | Exeter |
| 2026 | 21 | 56 | Exeter |
