= Jim Hunt (trainer) =

American athletic trainer (1903–1999)

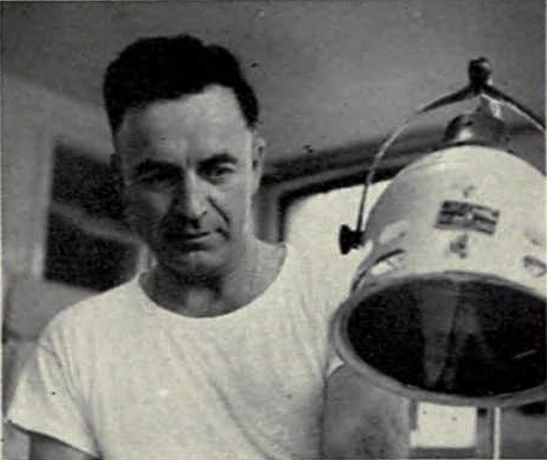
- Hunt from the 1951 Michiganensian
- Born: June 20, 1903; Green Isle, Minnesota, U.S.
- Died: May 9, 1999 (aged 95); Ann Arbor, Michigan, U.S.
- Years active: 1942–1967
- Known for: Athletic trainer

James Edward Hunt (June 20, 1903 – May 9, 1999) was an American athletic trainer. A Minnesota native, he began his career as chief assistant trainer at the University of Minnesota from 1926 to 1929 while he was a student in the physical education college. He graduated in 1929 and worked for a time in the South St. Paul and St. Paul school systems, though he continued to work Minnesota Golden Gophers football games on Saturdays. He then served as the University of Minnesota head trainer from 1942 to 1946. He then served as the head trainer for the Michigan Wolverines football team from 1947 to 1967. Hunt gained recognition for his innovative work in developing protective equipment and is noted for being "the first trainer to use fiberglass to help prevent serious injuries." In a 1950 feature story on Hunt, The Ann Arbor News called him "a walking drugstore" who carried in his black bag "bottles of cocaine", "between 20 and 30 different kinds of pills and capsules that range from aspirin to pain-killing drugs," and "sleeping powder." In 1951, he was honored as Trainer of the Year by the Helms Foundation Hall of Fame, and in 1957, he was elected as the president of the National Athletic Trainers Association.

Hunt was known for his meticulous system of recording and tracking injuries and their causation. He carried a portable tape recorder during practice and scrimmages, describing injuries as they took place, including notes on the conditions causing the injury and the player's reactions. Even if the player declined treatment, Hunt followed up with questioning on the field, in the dressing room, or the next day before practice. At night, he listened to the tapes and prepared memoranda of his observations.

Hunt retired in July 1968 at the age of 65 in order to open a physical therapy practice in Ann Arbor. In 1999, he died at the age of 95.

== See also ==
- List of Michigan Wolverines football trainers

Preceded by Ray Roberts	Michigan Wolverines football trainer 1947–1967	Succeeded by Lindsy McLean
