= Lindsy McLean =

American Athletic Trainer

J. Lindsy McLean
Biographical details
- Born: 1938 (age 87–88); Tennessee
- Education: Vanderbilt University

Coaching career (HC unless noted)
- 1961–1963: Michigan (Assistant Athletic Trainer)
- 1963–1965: UC Santa Barbara (Head Athletic Trainer)
- 1965–1978: San Jose State (Head Athletic Trainer)
- 1968–1979: Michigan (Head Athletic Trainer)
- 1979–2003: San Francisco 49ers (Head Athletic Trainer)

J. Lindsy McLean was an American football coach and athletic trainer for college and professional football teams for nearly 50 years.

McLean's college career began as a student athletic trainer at Vanderbilt University in 1956. In 1963, he was the head athletic trainer and director of physical therapy at the University of California, Santa Barbara from 1963 to 1965. Next, in 1965, he was named the head athletic trainer and assistant professor at San Jose State College. Lastly, he was the head athletic trainer at the University of Michigan for eleven years from 1968 to 1979. While at Michigan, he was named the first chair of the National Athletic Trainers Association Board of Certification and was instrumental in developing certification standards for the athletic training profession. He was a member of the athletic training staff at the 1976 Winter Olympics in Innsbruck, Austria.

In 1979, he moved to professional sports and became the head athletic trainer for the San Francisco 49ers, a position he held for 24 years. He retired at the conclusion of the 2003 NFL season. In 1988, he was inducted into the National Athletic Trainers' Association Hall of Fame. In 2005, he received the Cain Fain Memorial Award from the NFL Physician's Society and in 2008, received the Tim Kerin Award for Athletic Training Excellence. McLean has five super bowl rings with the 49ers. According to NFL records (2010), McLean and only three other people had five rings, among them Bill Belichick and player Charles Haley (49ers and Cowboys.)

In February 2004, ESPN The Magazine published a feature story on McLean in which he came out publicly as gay and discussed his experiences in the world of football. He said that many players and team officials were aware of his homosexuality during his years with the 49ers. He detailed incidents of harassment from players as well, including one player who repeatedly grabbed him and performed simulated sex while other players watched.

In 2023, Lindsy McLean was inducted into the Professional Athletic Trainers Society Hall of Fame (PFATS) , and received the Award of Excellence from the Pro Football Hall of Fame.

Lindsy currently is retired and lives in Brentwood, Tennessee.

== See also ==
- Homosexuality in American football

Preceded by Jim Hunt	Michigan Wolverines football trainer 1968–1978	Succeeded by Russ Miller
