= Al Tharnish =

Eli Albert ("Al") Tharnish (May 3, 1869 – March 18, 1935) was an American runner known for foot racing and was the first to be called "The World's Fastest Man".

From 1884 to 1891, Tharnish was never defeated in a race for money, including races from a 50-yard dash to four miles. He was trained by Ed W. Moulton, trainer of Charlie Paddock. His time for the 100 yard dash was 9 4/5 seconds. Tharnish ran for Barnum and Bailey after racing and beating a man, while barefoot and in overalls, the circus had claimed to be "the world's fastest human."

Tharnish was born in Darien, New York but shortly his family moved to Audubon, Iowa.
