= Edward Moulton =

American sprinter, athletic trainer, and coach

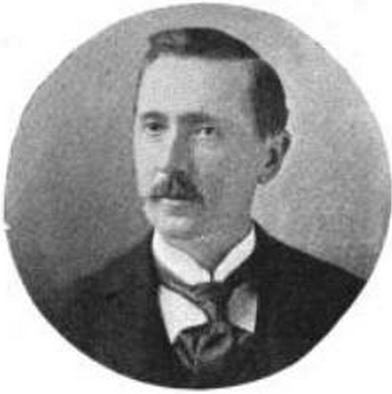

Biographical details
- Born: 1848; St. Anthony Falls, Minnesota, U.S.
- Died: July 19, 1922 (aged 74); Palo Alto, California, U.S.

Coaching career (HC unless noted)

Football
- 1891: Minnesota
- 1893: Michigan (trainer)
- 1894: Iowa (trainer)
- 1895–1896: Minnesota (trainer)
- c. 1900: Stanford (trainer)

Track and field
- 1897: Wisconsin
- 1903–1913: Stanford
- 1916: Stanford

Head coaching record
- Overall: 3–1–1 (football)

Edward W. "Dad" Moulton (1848 – July 19, 1922) was an American sprinter, athletic trainer, and coach. He was a professional sprinter who won more than 300 races and was regarded as the American sprinting champion from 1872 to 1878. Moulton later worked as a trainer of sprinters, wrestlers, boxers, and bicyclists. He trained many well-known track and field athletes from the 1880s through the 1910s, including the original "world's fastest human," Al Tharnish, and Olympic medalists Alvin Kraenzlein (four gold medals in 1900), Charlie Paddock (two gold medals and one silver in 1920), Morris Kirksey (one gold and one silver in 1920), George Horine (bronze medal in 1912), and Feg Murray (bronze medal in 1920).

In the 1890s, Moulton was also employed as a trainer and coach of American football, including one year as the head football coach at the University of Minnesota. Moulton also coached athletics and worked as a trainer at other schools, including the University of Michigan, the University of Iowa, and the University of Wisconsin. He spent most of the last 22 years of his life working as a coach and trainer of track and field, football and baseball at Stanford University.

== Early years ==
Moulton was born in 1848 at Saint Anthony Falls, Minnesota, now part of Minneapolis. He was reported to be "the second white boy born in the place". During the American Civil War, he enlisted in the 1st Minnesota Heavy Artillery Regiment at age 14 or 15. He participated in Sherman's March to the Sea and later became a scout and participated in "skirmishes" with the Indians during a mission blazing a trail to Helena, Montana.

== Professional sprinter ==
Moulton developed a reputation as a foot racer while living on the frontier, and later became a professional sprinter. It was while working in the west as a scout that Moulton's talent as a sprinter was discovered. One published story recounts the circumstance as follows:

One morning ... a young buffalo was sighted and because the horses were all picketed, the plainsmen were forced to give chase on foot. Moulton outdistanced them all, gained two hundred yards on the buffalo, no doubt very tired from trailing its herd, and succeeded in shooting it down. Thereafter, his name was a by-word on the plains. He did not lose a race that year.

Moulton was considered the American sprinting champion from 1872 to 1878. According to one account, he won 303 consecutive races. According to another account, he lost only four of 306 contests in which he entered.

== Training and coaching career ==
=== Early years as a trainer ===
After retiring as a sprinter, Moulton worked as a trainer of sprinters, wrestlers, boxers, and bicyclists. He trained 11 volunteer fireman's hose teams that won nine state championships. He first won acclaim as the trainer for Al Tharnish, who became known in the 1880s as the "world's fastest human." In 1971, Sports Illustrated published a feature story on Tharnish. According to the article, Moulton discovered Tharnish performing in a circus and persuaded him to leave the circus. There were no open track-and-field events in the 1880s, and Tharnish ran in college meets, professional races and head-to-head challenges. According to the 1971 Sports Illustrated story, "For four years Tharnish and Moulton were never in a town longer than two days, but during that time they managed to clean the local sports of money, medals and most of the simpler satisfactions of winning."

Over the next four decades, Moulton also trained other well-known track and field stars, including world champion sprinter Harry M. Johnson, Sheffield handicap champion James "Cuckoo" Collins, Olympic gold medalists Alvin Kraenzlein and Charlie Paddock, and University of Wisconsin sprinter James Maybury. He also performed on the vaudeville circuit with a trained dog act.

=== Midwestern universities ===
During the 1890s, Moulton became involved in training and coaching football teams. In 1891, Moulton was the trainer and head coach of the football team at the University of Minnesota. The 1891 squad compiled a record of 3–1–1, including wins over Wisconsin (26–12) and Iowa (42–4). From 1892 to 1893, Moulton was affiliated with the University of Iowa. While at Iowa, he trained John V. Crum. In 1893, Moulton served as the trainer for the 1893 Michigan Wolverines football team that compiled a 7–3 record and outscored its opponents by a combined score of 278 to 102. In 1894, he trained the University of Iowa football team. In 1895, Moulton returned to the University of Minnesota as the trainer for the football team during the 1895 and 1896 seasons. He also coached sprinter John V. Crum in 1895; Crum won the intercollegiate championship in the 100-yard and 220-yard sprints. In January 1897, Moulton was hired as the track and field coach at the University of Wisconsin. Moulton also reportedly worked as a trainer at the University of Missouri, Vanderbilt University, and Notre Dame University.

=== Stanford ===
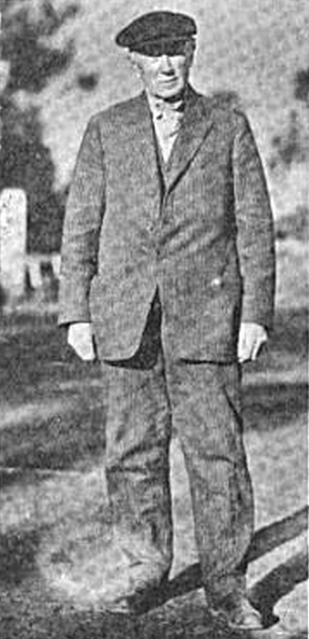
Moulton in his later years at Stanford

Moulton was hired as the trainer of the Stanford football team in approximately 1900. He also began training the track and baseball teams in approximately 1902. From 1903 to 1913 and again in 1916, Moulton was Stanford's track coach. In 1905, he rejected offers from Eastern universities, including Yale, to become a trainer at those institutions. He survived a bout with typhoid fever in 1910. Moulton transformed Stanford into one of the country's leading track and field programs. The track stars developed by Moulton at Stanford include Morris Kirksey (silver medalist in the 100-meter dash at the 1920 Olympics), Norman Dole (set world record in the pole vault in 1904), George Horine (bronze medalist in the high jump at the 1912 Olympics), Fred Crawford, Feg Murray (bronze medalist in the 110-meter hurdles at the 1920 Olympics), Leland Scott (pole vaulter), and the Templeton brothers (Rick and Dink).

In 1907, Moulton signed a four-year contract with Stanford at a salary of $1,800 per year. In 1911, he signed a three-year contract at a salary of $2,000 per year. When the 1911 contract was announced, the Los Angeles Times reported, "Although Stanford did not have a successful year in athletics, from the standpoint of victories, 'Dad' is just as popular as ever among the students. He is a fixture at Stanford." However, by the summer of 1912, the Los Angeles Times reported that students had concluded that greater success could be achieved with a younger trainer, although Moulton would likely be permitted to remain at Stanford for as long as he wished. With the exception of a year in 1915 when Moulton worked on the Panama–Pacific International Exposition, Moulton remained affiliated with Stanford until his death in 1922.

Moulton also won acclaim as a designer and builder of tracks. He built the tracks used for the 1915 Panama–Pacific International Exposition and managed the track during the exposition. He also built tracks at Stanford University, University of Minnesota, Iowa State University, Vanderbilt University, University of Tennessee, University of Wisconsin, Manchester, England, Notre Dame, Willamette College, and Pacific University.

The Stanford Archives maintains two scrapbooks maintained by Moulton. The scrapbooks contain newspaper clippings, flyers and letters documenting Moulton's career as an athlete and coach and concerning his trained dog vaudeville act.

== Family and death ==
As a young man Moulton married 15-year-old Emma Walter, in Philadelphia, on January 13, 1873. Emma later became an Indian Club swinger and toured theatres, also clog dancing and singing. The couple's engagements meant they were often apart and Emma filed for a divorce at Denver on June 29, 1893. The marriage was dissolved on November 9, 1893. By then Emma had become acquainted with William B. Masterson, the noted lawman, gambler and sporting man, and lived as Mrs. Bat Masterson for the rest of his life. Moulton married cyclist Ida Peterson on September 5, 1901. and at the time of the 1910 United States census, he was living in Palo Alto, California, with his wife Ida, a Minnesota native who was 26 years younger than Moulton, and their adopted son Edwin, who was born in approximately 1906. His occupation was listed as an athletic trainer. At the time of the 1920 United States census, Moulton was still living in Palo Alto with his wife Ida and son Edwin. His occupation at that time was listed as a custodian. Moulton died on July 19, 1922, at his home in Palo Alto. He was survived by his wife and son. He was reportedly in good health up to the day of his death when an "attack of indigestion caused heart dilation".

== Head coaching record ==
=== Football ===
| Year | Team | Overall | Conference | Standing | Bowl/playoffs |
|---|---|---|---|---|---|
Minnesota Golden Gophers (Independent) (1891)
| 1891 | Minnesota | 3–1–1 | | | |
| Minnesota: | | 3–1–1 | | | |
| Total: | | 3–1–1 | | | |

| Preceded by Mike Murphy | Michigan Wolverines football trainer 1893 | Succeeded by Keene Fitzpatrick |
