= The Young Idea (phrase) =

Phrase describing youth

The Young Idea is a phrase used to describe youth. The term is often used in literature, music, films, TV, radio, and other media. The best-known use is for the title of a play by Noël Coward.

== Origin and use ==
The phrase comes from the poem "Spring", written by the Scottish author James Thomson in 1728, one of a series of four poems titled The Seasons. The poem focuses on the arrival of spring, and uses personification to bring the natural world to life. It contains the lines:

Delightful task! to rear the tender thought,
To teach the young idea how to shoot,
To pour the fresh instruction o'er the mind,
To breathe th' inspiring spirit, and to plant
The generous purpose in the glowing breast.

The word idea comes from Greek ἰδέα idea "form, pattern", and The American Encyclopaedic Dictionary (1894) gives "To teach the young idea how to shoot" as an example for the word "shoot", meaning "To make progress; to advance"; so the phrase "To teach the young idea how to shoot" describes the forming and training of the young.

Charles Dickens refers to the phrase in jest when Pip relates that Mrs. Pocket:

taught the young idea how to shoot, by shooting it into bed whenever it attracted her notice.

— Charles Dickens, Great Expectations (1860 – 1861), chapter 34

However, the meaning gradually broadened in scope, "the young idea" referring generally to the world of young people and the way they saw things, until it meant no more than "children", "young people", "youth" or "young". For example:

I had the view of a castle of romance inhabited by a rosy sprite, such a place as would somehow, for diversion of the young idea, take all color out of storybooks and fairytales.

— Henry James, The Turn of the Screw (1898), chapter I

== Examples ==
=== Written works ===
- The Young Idea: A Sketch for "Old Boys" by One of Them (1884), novel by James Franklin Fuller
- The Young Idea (1888), children's monthly magazine edited and published by Cora Scott Pope
- "The Young Idea" Or, Common School Culture (1888), book about teaching by Caroline Bigelow Le Row
- The Young Idea: A Comedy of Environment (1910), novel by Frank Swinnerton
- The Young Idea : A Neighborhood Chronicle (1911), novel by Parker H. Fillmore
- The Young Idea: An Anthology of Opinion Concerning the Spirit and Aims of Contemporary American Literature (1917), anthology edited by Lloyd R. Morris
- The Young Idea (1956), publication by educationalist Josephine Macalister Brew
- About The Young Idea: The Story of The Jam 1972 – 1982 (1984), book by Mike Nicholls

=== Plays ===
- The Young Idea (1914, later renamed Just Herself for Broadway), by Ethel Watts Mumford
- The Young Idea: A Comedy in One Act (1922), by Herbert Swears
- The Young Idea (1922), by Noël Coward. First performed in 1923, and many times since. The best-known use of the phrase

=== Films ===
- The Jam: About the Young Idea, 2015 documentary film about The Jam

=== TV and Radio ===
- The Young Idea (1939), BBC Television adaptation of Noël Coward's play, starring Olga Edwardes
- The Young Idea (1951), BBC Radio Ulster series starring Northern Irish comedian Jimmy Young
- The Young Idea (1976), BBC Radio 3 performance by John Betjeman

=== Music ===
- The Young Idea (1930), rhapsody for piano and orchestra by Victor Hely-Hutchinson
- The Young Idea (1967), album by the group of the same name (Tony Cox and Douglas MacRae-Brown), including a version of "With a Little Help from My Friends" which made the UK singles chart
- About the Young Idea: The Very Best of The Jam (2015), compilation album by The Jam
- The Young Idea / A Pop Tribute to Anthony Meynell and Squire (2006), album by various artists

=== Exhibitions ===
- The Jam: About the Young Idea, 2015 exhibition about The Jam, held at Somerset House in London
- About the Young Idea, 2016 exhibition about The Jam, held at the Cunard Building in Liverpool

=== Journalism ===
- "The Young Idea in Architecture" (1932), review by M. S. Briggs in The Burlington Magazine of the book The New Style: Architecture and Decorative Design by Maurice Casteels
- "Young Idea", pages in British Vogue championing up-and-coming innovative young designers
