= William Nelson Queal =

American long-distance runner

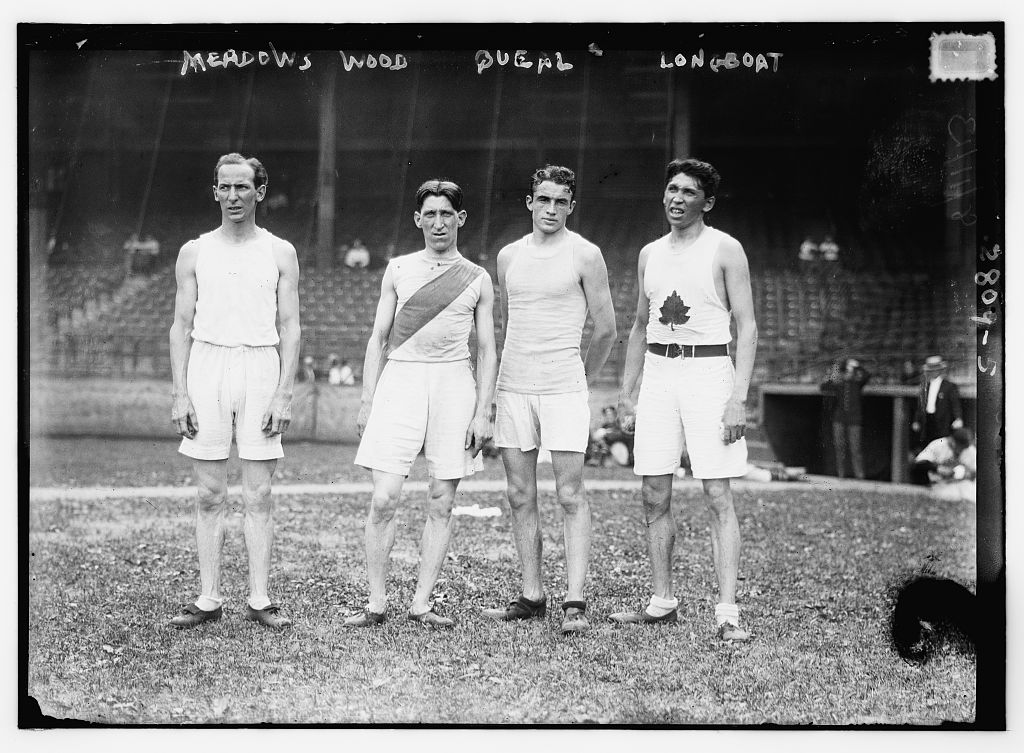
A. Meadows, Abbie E. Wood, Bill Queal, and Tom Longboat on July 26, 1913, at Ebbets Field

William Nelson Queal, Sr. (August 9, 1887 – July 8, 1960), was an American distance runner. He was noted as one of the world's greatest runners of his time.

== Early life ==
He was born in Merced, California and spent his childhood there before traveling to his parents home state of New York.

== Athletic career ==
In 1908, at Alexandria Bay, he went into a race to fill out a card and won, which good fortune continued to be his for two years until he lost two races, both through accidents. In 1911 he won a 15-mile championship race, held the world record at the time with 1908 Swedish Olympic runner John Swanberg for the 15 and 20 mile outdoor relay races, 20 and 26 mile races, 384 yards, indoor relay race world's record (with Holmes), as well as one hour running races, defeating the best men. On June 22, 1912, he defeated Woods and Indigenous Canadian runner, Tom Longboat in a five-mile race, making a new professional world's record - 24 minutes, 39 and 2/3rd's seconds.

Later in his career, he worked as a coach for the Yale track team, Yale University, and also served as a 1st Lieutenant in the Army Air Service during (World War I], at which time he became a trainer for the Eighth Regiment during the indoor seasons. During the fall and spring meets, he served as a trainer at Fordham University. He eventually retired to Saint Petersburg, Florida, where he spent the remainder of his life.
