= John J. Mack (coach) =

John J. Mack (1870 - August 29, 1923), was the Yale University track coach.

== Biography ==
John J. Mack was born in Cleveland, Ohio in 1870. He began working as an athletic trainer in Clinton, Iowa in 1896. He went on to work at the Wanderers Amateur Athletic Club and the University of Maine before being hired by Yale in 1905.

He died from pneumonia in Revere, Massachusetts on August 29, 1923.
