= 1897 Missouri Tigers football team =

American college football season

1897 Missouri Tigers football
- Conference: Western Interstate University Football Association
- Record: 5–6 (0–2 WIUFA)
- Head coach: Charles Young (1st season)
- Captain: Adam Hill
- Home stadium: Rollins Field

1896 Western Interstate University Football Association standings
	Conf.					Overall
Team	W		L		T	W		L		T
Iowa $	2	–	0	–	1	7	–	1	–	1
Kansas	2	–	1	–	0	7	–	3	–	0
Nebraska	1	–	1	–	1	6	–	3	–	1
Missouri	0	–	3	–	0	7	–	5	–	0
$ – Conference champion

The 1897 Missouri Tigers football team was an American football team that represented the University of Missouri as an independent during the 1897 college football season. In its first season under head coach Charles Young, the team compiled an 5–6 record.

== Schedule ==
Date	Time	Opponent	Site	Result	Attendance	Source
October 4		Warrensburg Normal	Rollins Field; Columbia, MO	W 10–0		
October 9		at Kansas City Medics	Kansas City, MO	L 0–4		
October 11		at Warrensburg Normal	Warrensburg, MO	L 0–10		
October 18		Iowa Wesleyan	Rollins Field; Columbia, MO	W 6–4		
October 30		at Nebraska	Lincoln, NE (rivalry)	L 0–41		
November 1		at Tarkio	Tarkio, MO	L 0–34		
November 2		at Amity	Coin, IA	W 8–4		
November 5		Westminster (MO)	Rollins Field; Columbia, MO	W 60–0		
November 13		at Purdue	Stuart Field; West Lafayette, IN	L 12–30		
November 15	3:00 p.m.	at Christian Brothers (MO)	C. B. C. campus; St. Louis, MO	W 16–0	2,000	
November 25	2:52 p.m.	vs. Kansas	Exposition Park; Kansas City, MO (rivalry)	L 0–16	4,000	
