= 1893 Nebraska Bugeaters football team =

American college football season

1893 Nebraska Bugeaters football
- Conference: Western Interstate University Football Association
- Record: 3–2–1 (1–2 WIUFA)
- Head coach: Frank Crawford (1st season)
- Home stadium: M Street Park

1893 Western Interstate University Football Association standings
	Conf.					Overall
Team	W		L		T	W		L		T
Missouri +	2	–	1	–	0	4	–	3	–	0
Kansas +	2	–	1	–	0	2	–	5	–	0
Nebraska	1	–	2	–	0	3	–	2	–	1
Iowa	1	–	2	–	0	3	–	4	–	0
+ – Conference co-champions

The 1893 Nebraska Bugeaters football team represented the University of Nebraska in the 1893 college football season. The team was coached by first-year head coach Frank Crawford, and played their home games at M Street Park, in Lincoln, Nebraska.

Prior to the 1893 season, NU hired an official head coach for the first time in program history. Frank Crawford, also the first head coach of Michigan's football program, was compensated with a $500 stipend plus tuition to the university. Nebraska also began charging a 25-cent admission fee to attend games played at M Street Park.

== Schedule ==
Date	Time	Opponent	Site	Result	Attendance	Source
October 21	3:00 p.m.	Doane*	M Street Park; Lincoln, NE	W 20–0		
October 28	3:00 p.m.	Baker*	M Street Park; Lincoln, NE	T 10–10		
November 4		at Denver Athletic Club*	Denver, CO	W 1–0 (forfeit)	2,500	
November 11	3:00 p.m.	vs. Missouri	Exposition Park; Kansas City, MO (rivalry)	L 18–30		
November 18	3:00 p.m.	Kansas	M Street Park; Lincoln, NE (rivalry)	L 0–18		
November 30	3:15 p.m.	vs. Iowa	YMCA Park; Omaha, NE (rivalry)	W 20–18	1,000	
*Non-conference game

== Coaching staff ==
Coach	Position	First year	Alma mater
Frank Crawford	Head coach	1893	Yale
Charles Thomas	Assistant coach	1893	Michigan
Jack Best	Trainer	1890	Nebraska
Arthur Weaver	Manager	1893	

== Roster ==
- Butte PLAYER
- Cameron, John E
- Carney, William PLAYER
- Dern, George RG
- Flippin, George HB
- Frank, Harry FB
- Hopewell, Isaac C
- Johnston, James E
- Lowrey PLAYER
- McFarland PLAYER
- Oury, W.Harry LT
- Pace, Eugene QB
- Ricketts PLAYER
- Ryan PLAYER
- Sawyer, Willits PLAYER
- Shue, James E
- Whipple, Otis RT
- Wiggins, Frank E
- Wilson, Wilmer LG
- Yont, Alonzo HB
- Yont, Jesse FB

== Offensive Starters ==
Offensive starters

LE James Johnston	LT / LG / C / RG / RT; Harry Oury / Wilmer Wilson / Isaac Hopewell / George Dern / Otis Whipple	RE James Shue

QB
Eugene Pace

HB	FB	HB
Alonzo Yont	Jesse Yont	George Flippin

== Game summaries ==
=== Doane ===
Doane at Nebraska

Team	1	2	Total
Doane	0	0	0
• Nebraska	12	16	28

- Date: October 21
- Location: M Street Park, Lincoln, NE

After no game between the two schools in 1892, Nebraska and Doane met in 1893 at M Street Park. Nebraska dominated the game, shutting out Doane, including a goal-line stand from the two-yard line that was followed by a lengthy NU touchdown drive. Doane, down by 28 late in the second half, ultimately forfeited the rest of the game.

Nebraska's first mascot, a white bull terrier painted red on one side, made its first appearance at this game.

=== Baker ===
Baker at Nebraska

Team	1	2	Total
Baker	4	6	10
Nebraska	6	4	10

- Date: October 28
- Location: M Street Park, Lincoln, NE

According to the custom of the time, each team selected one of the two members of the officiating crew, and Baker's selection was a member of their own team. Baker's official reportedly made a number of calls or non-calls that prompted anger from the Bugeaters, who quickly fell behind 6–0. Ten unanswered points gave Nebraska a 10–6 lead until a late Baker touchdown tied the game, and the game ended 10–10. This was the only game ever played between Baker and Nebraska.

=== At Denver Athletic Club ===
Nebraska at Denver AC

Team	1	2	Total
• Nebraska	0	4	1
Denver AC	4	0	0

- Date: November 4
- Location: Denver, CO
- Game attendance: 2,500

Nebraska's rematch with the Denver Athletic Club was a highly physical game, with reports of slugging, kicking, and at least one player temporarily knocked unconscious. Animosity ran high, reportedly nearing a riot by halftime. There were still ten minutes left to play in the second half of a tied game when the Denver AC squad was called for a slugging foul, turning the ball over to the Bugeaters. The Denver AC team walked off the field and, after an extended debate, refused to finish the game. This resulted in a forfeit, and the official score was recorded as a 1–0 Nebraska win.

=== Missouri ===
Nebraska vs. Missouri

Team	1	2	Total
Nebraska	12	6	18
• Missouri	12	18	30

- Date: November 11
- Location: Kansas City, MO

Before Nebraska's first conference game of the season, the team was delayed arriving in Kansas City until very early on the morning of the game. Missouri took advantage of the weary Bugeaters, outsscoring NU 18–6 in the second half to win the game 30–18.

University of Missouri records list the final score as an 18–12 Missouri victory.

=== Kansas ===
Kansas at Nebraska

Team	1	2	Total
• Kansas	6	12	18
Nebraska	0	0	0

- Date: November 18
- Location: M Street Park, Lincoln, NE

Nebraska's attempts to even the series with Kansas were quickly dashed. The Jayhawks scored all 18 of the game's points, including a bizarre play in which a Kansas punt was fumbled by Nebraska and recovered by Kansas, whose players subsequently fumbled and recovered the ball twice before running it in for a touchdown.

=== Iowa ===
Iowa vs. Nebraska

Team	1	2	Total
Iowa	6	12	18
• Nebraska	10	10	20

- Date: November 30
- Location: Omaha, NE
- Game weather: Blizzard

Iowa met Nebraska to close out league play in blizzard conditions. The game was punctuated by the appearance of Bugeater head coach Frank Crawford in the lineup, playing off the right half and kicking field goals (this practice was not uncommon at the time). Nebraska held on for a 20–18 win, resulting in a third-place WIUFA finish between Nebraska and Iowa.

University of Iowa records suggest this game was played on November 23, 1893.
