= 1894 Nebraska Bugeaters football team =

American college football season

1894 Nebraska Bugeaters football
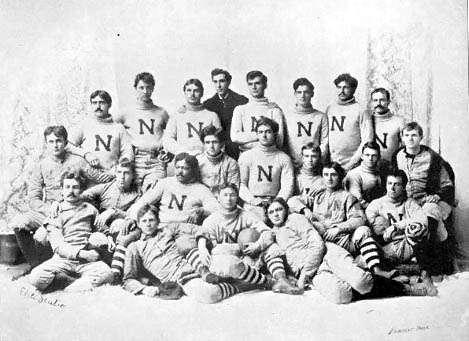

WIUFA co-champion
- Conference: Western Interstate University Football Association
- Record: 6–2 (2–1 WIUFA)
- Head coach: Frank Crawford (2nd season)
- Home stadium: M Street Park

1894 Western Interstate University Football Association standings
	Conf.					Overall
Team	W		L		T	W		L		T
Missouri +	2	–	1	–	0	4	–	3	–	0
Nebraska +	2	–	1	–	0	6	–	2	–	0
Kansas	1	–	2	–	0	2	–	3	–	1
Iowa	1	–	2	–	0	4	–	4	–	1
+ – Conference co-champions

The 1894 Nebraska Bugeaters football team represented the University of Nebraska in the 1894 college football season. The team was coached by second-year head coach Frank Crawford and played their home games at the M Street Park in Lincoln, Nebraska. They competed as members of the Western Interstate University Football Association.

For the first time in program history, Nebraska started the season with a returning head coach. Crawford left after the season to become the head football coach at Texas. NU played a pre-season exhibition game against Lincoln High.

== Schedule ==
Date	Time	Opponent	Site	Result	Attendance	Source
October 6	2:30 p.m.	vs. Lincoln High School*	11th Street and X Street; Lincoln, NE	W 8–0 (exhibition)		
October 20		Grinnell*	M Street Park; Lincoln, NE	W 22–0	650	
October 27		Doane*	M Street Park; Lincoln, NE	L 0–12		
November 3		vs. Missouri	Exposition Park; Kansas City, MO (rivalry)	L 14–18		
November 10		at Omaha YMCA*	Omaha YMCA Ball Park; Omaha, NE	W 36–6		
November 17	3:50 p.m.	at Kansas	McCook Field; Lawrence, KS (rivalry)	W 12–6	1,500	
November 19		at Ottawa*	Ottawa, KS	W 6–0	400	
November 29	3:00 p.m.	vs. Iowa	Omaha YMCA Ball Park; Omaha, NE (rivalry)	W 36–0		
December 25	3:00 p.m.	at Omaha YMCA*	Omaha YMCA Ball Park; Omaha, NE	W 10–6	400	
*Non-conference game

== Coaching staff ==
Coach	Position	First year	Alma mater
Frank Crawford	Head coach	1893	Yale
Charles Thomas	Assistant coach	1893	Michigan
Jack Best	Trainer	1890	Nebraska
Arthur Weaver	Manager	1893	

== Roster ==
- Bradt, Fletcher G
- Brandt, Fletcher PLAYER
- Cameron, John E
- Dern, George T
- Dungan, Will T
- Fair, Richard FB
- Flippin, George HB
- Frank, Harry FB
- Gardner PLAYER
- Hammang, John T
- Hayward, William FB
- Jones, Albin G
- Oury, W.Harry C
- Packard, Leonard E
- Shue, James E
- Smith G
- Spooner, Clinton QB
- Sweeney, F.W. FB
- Thomas FB
- Thorpe, Orley E
- Whipple, Otis E
- Wiggins, Frank E
- Wilson, Wilmer LG
- Yont, Alonzo HB

== Game summaries ==
=== Lincoln High ===
Lincoln High vs. Nebraska

Team	1	2	Total
Lincoln High			0
• Nebraska			8

- Date: October 6
- Location: Lincoln, NE

For the first time, Nebraska played an exhibition game prior to the regular season. Results and statistics from this game did not count toward the season.

=== Grinnell ===
Grinnell at Nebraska

Team	1	2	Total
Grinnell	0	0	0
• Nebraska	0	22	22

- Date: October 20
- Location: M Street Park, Lincoln, NE
- Game attendance: 650

Grinnell had won four of the previous five Iowa state championships prior to their first game against Nebraska. A hard-fought first half ended scoreless, but the underdog Bugeaters used three second-half touchdowns by George Flippin to pull away.

=== Doane ===
Doane at Nebraska

Team	1	2	Total
• Doane	6	6	12
Nebraska	0	0	0

- Date: October 27
- Location: M Street Park, Lincoln, NE

Doane scored once in each half to upset the Bugeaters.

=== At Missouri ===
Nebraska at Missouri

Team	1	2	Total
Nebraska	4	10	14
• Missouri	12	6	18

- Date: November 3
- Location: Kansas City, MO

Nebraska's first conference game in 1894 was a trip to Missouri. The Tigers won 18–14.

=== At Omaha YMCA ===
Nebraska at Omaha YMCA

Team	1	2	Total
• Nebraska	30	6	36
Omaha YMCA	0	6	6

- Date: November 10
- Location: Omaha YMCA Ball Park, Omaha, NE

Nebraska's first-ever football game was a tightly contested game against the Omaha YMCA, but by 1894 the Bugeaters outmatched the YMCA's team of high school students and other Omaha residents. Nebraska led 30–0 lead at halftime, and won the game 36–6.

=== At Kansas ===
Nebraska at Kansas

Team	1	2	Total
• Nebraska	8	4	12
Kansas	6	0	6

- Date: November 17
- Location: Central Park, Lawrence, KS

An officiating dispute delayed kickoff, but once underway Kansas took an early 6–0 lead. The Bugeaters pulled ahead 8–6 by halftime and kept the Jayhawks off the scoreboard in the second half to win for the first time against Kansas.

University of Kansas records suggest this game was played on November 22, 1894 in Lincoln.

=== At Ottawa ===
Nebraska at Ottawa

Team	1	2	Total
• Nebraska	6	0	6
Ottawa	0	0	0

- Date: November 19
- Location: Ottawa, KS
- Game attendance: 400

Though the game was planned just one week ahead of time, efforts were made to publicize the match, drawing over 400 locals from the area to watch. Nebraska padded its roster in preparation, adding head coach Frank Crawford as a quarterback and another (unnamed) football coach as a fullback. Nebraska's first half touchdown was the only scoring of the day. This was the only game ever played between Nebraska and Ottawa.

=== Iowa ===
Nebraska vs. Iowa

Team	1	2	Total
• Nebraska	12	24	36
Iowa	0	0	0

- Date: November 29
- Location: Omaha, NE

Nebraska's final conference game was a trip to Omaha to meet Iowa. Nebraska, led by future Utah governor and United States Secretary of War George Dern, dominated the game en route to a 36–0 win. The win gave Nebraska a share of its first conference championship.

University of Iowa records suggest the final score of this game was a 14–12 Nebraska victory.

=== At Omaha YMCA ===
Nebraska at Omaha YMCA

Team	1	2	Total
• Nebraska	0	10	10
Omaha YMCA	6	0	6

- Date: December 25
- Location: Omaha YMCA Ball Park, Omaha, NE
- Game attendance: 400
- Game weather: Cold

After a dominating Nebraska victory just weeks prior, the Omaha YMCA nearly upset the Bugeaters in a Christmas Day rematch. The YMCA led 6–0 at halftime but Nebraska answered with 10 points in the second half to win.
