= 1894 Missouri Tigers football team =

American college football season

1894 Missouri Tigers football
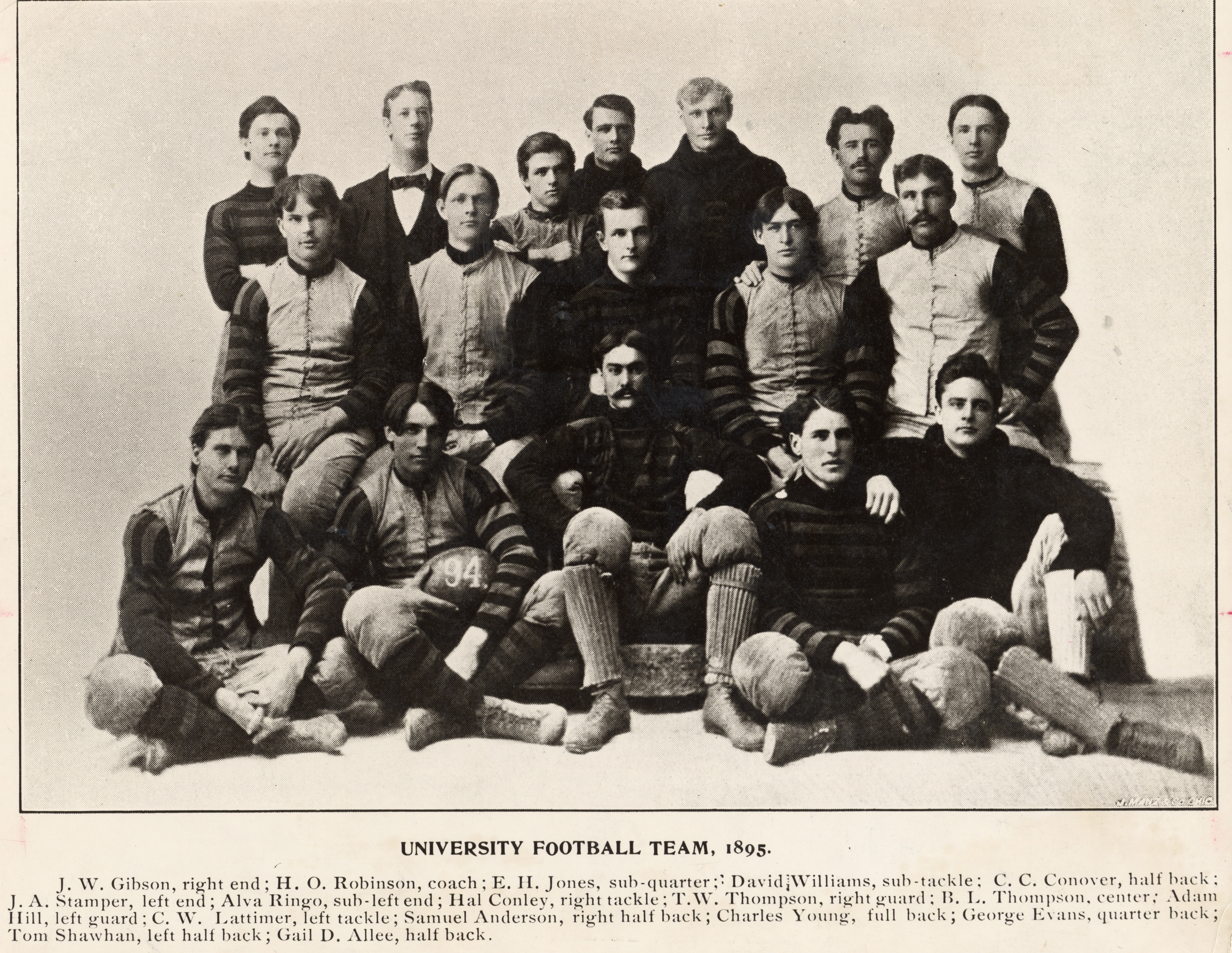

WIUFA co-champion
- Conference: Western Interstate University Football Association
- Record: 4–3 (2–1 WIUFA)
- Head coach: Harry Orman Robinson (2nd season)
- Captain: Charles Young

1894 Western Interstate University Football Association standings
	Conf.					Overall
Team	W		L		T	W		L		T
Missouri +	2	–	1	–	0	4	–	3	–	0
Nebraska +	2	–	1	–	0	6	–	2	–	0
Kansas	1	–	2	–	0	2	–	3	–	1
Iowa	1	–	2	–	0	4	–	4	–	1
+ – Conference co-champions

The 1894 Missouri Tigers football team was an American football team that represented the University of Missouri as a member of the Western Interstate University Football Association (WIUFA) during the 1894 college football season. In its second season under head coach Harry Orman Robinson, the team compiled a 4–3 record (2–1 against WIUFA championship) and tied with Nebraska for the conference championship.

== Schedule ==
Date	Time	Opponent	Site	Result	Attendance	Source
October 16		Sedalia Athletic Club*	Columbia, MO	W 44–6		
October 27		Denver Athletic Club*	Columbia, MO	L 0–26		
November 3		vs. Nebraska	Exposition Park; Kansas City, MO (rivalry)	W 18–14		
November 10		at Ottawa*	Ottawa, KS	L 0–28		
November 19		Iowa	Athletic Park; Columbia, MO	W 32–16		
November 29	3:10 p.m.	vs. Kansas	Exposition Park; Kansas City, MO (rivalry)	L 12–18	10,000	
December 15		at Texas*	Hyde Park; Austin, TX	W 28–0	5,000	
*Non-conference game
