= 1896 Nebraska Bugeaters football team =

American college football season

1896 Nebraska Bugeaters football

Nebraska state champion
- Conference: Western Interstate University Football Association
- Record: 6–3–1 (1–1–1 WIUFA)
- Head coach: Edward N. Robinson (1st season)
- Home stadium: M Street Park

1896 Western Interstate University Football Association standings
	Conf.					Overall
Team	W		L		T	W		L		T
Iowa $	2	–	0	–	1	7	–	1	–	1
Kansas	2	–	1	–	0	7	–	3	–	0
Nebraska	1	–	1	–	1	6	–	3	–	1
Missouri	0	–	3	–	0	7	–	5	–	0
$ – Conference champion

The 1896 Nebraska Bugeaters football team represented the University of Nebraska in the 1896 college football season. The team was coached by first-year head coach Edward N. Robinson and played their home games in at the M Street Park in Lincoln, Nebraska. They competed as members of the Western Interstate University Football Association.

Future College Football Hall of Fame head coach Robinson became Nebraska's third official head coach when Charles Thomas left for Arkansas. Robinson was the first Nebraska coach to require each player to pass a physical.

== Schedule ==
Date	Time	Opponent	Site	Result	Attendance	Source
October 17	2:00 p.m.	Doane*	M Street Park; Lincoln, NE	W 20–0		
October 26		at Missouri	Rollins Field; Columbia, MO (rivalry)	W 8–4		
October 31	3:00 p.m.	Nebraska Wesleyan*	M Street Park; Lincoln, NE	W 18–8		
November 7	3:00 p.m.	at Kansas	McCook Field; Lawrence, KS (rivalry)	L 4–18	1,200	
November 9		at Kansas City Medics*	Exposition Park; Kansas City, MO	W 6–4		
November 12	2:30 p.m.	Butte AC*	M Street Park; Lincoln, NE	L 6–29		
November 19	2:30 p.m.	Iowa Agricultural*	M Street Park; Lincoln, NE (rivalry)	W 12–4		
November 23		Nebraska Wesleyan*	M Street Park; Lincoln, NE	W 28–0		
November 26	3:30 p.m.	vs. Iowa	University Park; Omaha, NE (rivalry)	T 0–0		
November 28	3:00 p.m.	vs. Iowa	University Park; Omaha, NE	L 0–6		
*Non-conference game

== Coaching staff ==
Coach	Position	First year	Alma mater
Eddie N. Robinson	Head coach	1896	Brown
Jack Best	Trainer	1890	Nebraska
Harry Oury	Manager	1896	Nebraska
John Cameron	Assistant manager	1896	Nebraska

== Roster ==
Benedict, Bruce E Burt, Frederick HB; Cameron, John E Cook, Hugh HB; Corby, [unknown] RT; Cowgill, Howard QB; Dungan, Will LT; Garrett, Harry FB; Hansen, Albert LG; Jones, Harry E Kellar, C.E. LG; Kindler, [unknown] PLAYER	Melford, William E Packard, Leonard FB; Pearse, Arthur RT; Placek, Emil QB; Robbins, J.S. C Shedd, George HB; Thorpe, Orley QB; Turner, Edmund RG; Whipple, Otis E Wiggins, Frank E

== Game summaries ==
=== Doane ===
Doane at Nebraska

Team	1	2	Total
Doane	0	0	0
• Nebraska	6	14	20

- Date: October 17
- Location: M Street Park, Lincoln, NE

Nebraska hosted Doane in Lincoln for the eighth meeting of these squads. The Bugeaters started slow but pulled away in the second half to win 20–0.

=== At Missouri ===
Nebraska at Missouri

Team	1	2	Total
• Nebraska	0	8	8
Missouri	4	0	4

- Date: October 26
- Location: Columbia, MO

Nebraska made its first trip to Columbia to open conference play in 1896. Missouri scored the only points of the first half, but was unable to answer two second-half Nebraska touchdowns.

=== Nebraska Wesleyan (October) ===
Nebraska Wesleyan at Nebraska

Team	1	2	Total
Nebraska Wesleyan	8	0	8
• Nebraska	12	6	18

- Date: October 31
- Location: M Street Park, Lincoln, NE

Nebraska hosted nearby Nebraska Wesleyan for the first time, though it was essentially a home game for both teams; Nebraska Wesleyan was then located in the town of University Place, later absorbed into Lincoln. Wesleyan's first points came following a blocked punt, and another touchdown before halftime kept the game close, but they were never able to pull ahead of the Bugeaters.

=== At Kansas ===
Nebraska at Kansas

Team	1	2	Total
Nebraska	4	0	4
• Kansas	6	12	18

- Date: November 7
- Location: Central Park, Lawrence, KS

Kansas rebounded from an error-prone first half, shutting out the Bugeaters in the second half en route to an 18–4 win.

University of Kansas records suggest that this game was played on November 8, 1896.

=== At KC Medics ===
Nebraska at Kansas City Medics

Team	1	2	Total
• Nebraska	0	6	6
Kansas City Medics	0	4	4

- Date: November 9
- Location: Kansas City, MO

Nebraska traveled to Missouri for their first meeting with the Kansas City Medics. Both teams agreed beforehand to play a shorter-than-normal game, and the abbreviated first half ended scoreless. The Bugeaters went ahead 6–0 after halftime and survived a scare when KC scored with 30 seconds left to play, but missed the game-tying field kick.

=== Butte AC ===
Butte AC at Nebraska

Team	1	2	Total
• Butte AC			20
Nebraska			6

- Date: November 12
- Location: M Street Park, Lincoln, NE

The Butte Athletic Club made the lengthy trip to Lincoln after a visit from Nebraska in 1895. Butte dominated the Bugeaters for the second consecutive year, scoring the game's final 14 points to win 20–6. This was the final meeting between Butte AC and Nebraska.

=== Iowa Agricultural ===
Iowa Agricultural at Nebraska

Team	1	2	Total
Iowa Agricultural			4
• Nebraska			12

- Date: November 19
- Location: M Street Park, Lincoln, NE

This was the first meeting between teams that would later meet annually for decades, as members of the Missouri Valley Intercollegiate Athletic Association, Big Eight, and Big 12. Iowa Agricultural, later renamed Iowa State, entered 7–1, but Nebraska controlled the game en route to a 12–4 victory.

=== Nebraska Wesleyan (November) ===
Nebraska Wesleyan at Nebraska

Team	1	2	Total
Nebraska Wesleyan	0	0	0
• Nebraska	28	0	28

- Date: November 23
- Location: M Street Park, Lincoln, NE

Nebraska led 28–0 at halftime in the second 1896 meeting between the two teams. Wesleyan, playing without several key players, never managed to get the ball inside Nebraska's 10-yard line. Nebraska's wins over Nebraska Wesleyan and victory over Doane made the Bugeaters Nebraska's state champion for the second consecutive year.

=== Iowa (November 26) ===
Iowa vs. Nebraska

Team	1	2	Total
Iowa	0	0	0
Nebraska	0	0	0

- Date: November 26
- Location: Omaha, NE
- Game start: 3:30 p.m.
- Game weather: Blizzard

Heavy snow and blizzards kept many spectators away on Thanksgiving Day in 1896, and the conditions led to a sloppy, scoreless game. The teams agreed to play for an additional ten minutes to break the tie, again without producing any points. Both teams, displeased with the scoreless draw, agreed to play again two days later.

=== Iowa (November 28) ===
Iowa vs. Nebraska

Team	1	2	Total
• Iowa	6	0	6
Nebraska	0	0	0

- Date: November 28
- Location: Omaha, NE
- Game start: 3:00 p.m.

The rematch between Iowa and Nebraska was held as scheduled just two days later, and the weather was marginally better. A first-half Iowa touchdown proved to be the only scoring of the game. While this game is an official contest in both schools' record books, it did not take the place of the scoreless conference game on November 26. As such, this game counts toward both teams' overall records, but not toward WIUFA standings or statistics. Iowa still won the conference championship outright at 2–0–1.
