= 1895 Missouri Tigers football team =

American college football season

1895 Missouri Tigers football

WIUFA co-champion
- Conference: Western Interstate University Football Association
- Record: 7–1 (2–1 WIUFA)
- Head coach: C. D. Bliss (1st season)
- Captain: Charles Young

1895 Western Interstate University Football Association standings
| | Conf. | | | | | Overall |
| Team | W | | L | | T | W | | L | | T |
|---|---|---|---|---|---|---|---|---|---|---|
| Missouri + | 2 | – | 1 | – | 0 | 7 | – | 1 | – | 0 |
| Kansas + | 2 | – | 1 | – | 0 | 6 | – | 1 | – | 0 |
| Nebraska + | 2 | – | 1 | – | 0 | 6 | – | 3 | – | 0 |
| Iowa | 0 | – | 3 | – | 0 | 2 | – | 5 | – | 0 |
+ – Conference co-champions

The 1895 Missouri Tigers football team was an American football team that represented the University of Missouri as a member of the Western Interstate University Football Association (WIUFA) during the 1895 college football season. In its first season under head coach C. D. Bliss, the team compiled a 7–1 record (2–1 against WIUFA championship) and finished in a three-way tie with Kansas and Nebraska for the conference championship.

== Schedule ==
| Date | Time | Opponent | Site | Result | Attendance | Source |
|---|---|---|---|---|---|---|
| October 7 | | Sedalia Athletic Club* | Columbia, MO | W 10–0 | | |
| October 12 | | Vanderbilt* | Columbia, MO | W 16–0 | | |
| October 19 | 3:00 p.m. | vs. Purdue* | West End grounds; St. Louis, MO | W 16–6 | | |
| October 26 | | vs. DePauw* | St. Louis, MO | W 38–0 | | |
| November 2 | | vs. Nebraska | University Park; Omaha, NE (rivalry) | L 10–12 | | |
| November 9 | | vs. Northwestern* | Sharpshooters' Park; St. Louis, MO | W 22–18 | | |
| November 18 | | Iowa | Columbia, MO | W 34–0 | | |
| November 28 | 2:40 p.m. | vs. Kansas | Exposition Park; Kansas City, MO (rivalry) | W 10–6 | 10,000 | |
*Non-conference game
