= C. D. Bliss =

American football player and coach (1870–1948)

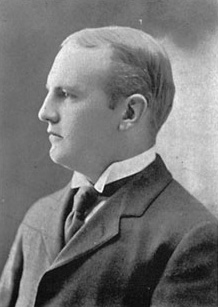
- Bliss pictured in The Savitar 1896, Missouri yearbook

Biographical details
- Born: July 16, 1870; New York, New York, U.S.
- Died: March 26, 1948 (aged 77); Hartford, Connecticut, U.S.

Playing career
- 1889: Yale
- 1891–1892: Yale
- Position: Halfback

Coaching career (HC unless noted)
- 1893: Stanford
- 1894: Haverford
- 1895: Missouri

Head coaching record
- Overall: 15–6–1

Accomplishments and honors

Championships
- 1 WIUFA (1895)

Clifford Douglas "Pop" Bliss (July 16, 1870 – March 26, 1948) was an American college football player and coach. He served as the head football coach at Stanford University, Haverford College, and the University of Missouri, compiling a career coaching record of 15–6–1. Bliss played football at Yale University as a halfback alongside his brother, Laurie Bliss, who went on to coach at the United States Military Academy and Lehigh University.

== Playing career ==
Bliss was born in New York City and attended Yale University, where he played halfback. With his brother, Laurie Bliss, in the same backfield, he led Yale to back-to-back national championships and undefeated seasons in 1891 and 1892. Coached by Walter Camp, Yale did not allow opposing teams to score a single point in those two seasons.

== Coaching career ==
In 1893, Bliss was named head football coach at Stanford University. Bliss, who had graduated from Yale the year before, was filling in for Walter Camp, who was the school's first coach in 1892 and returned in 1894. Bliss' team was undefeated with one tie.

In 1894, Bliss coached Haverford College but the team did not win a single game. In 1895, Bliss became the fifth head coach for the University of Missouri–Columbia Tigers located in Columbia, Missouri where his team record was 7–1.

== Head coaching record ==
Year	Team	Overall	Conference	Standing	Bowl/playoffs
Stanford (Independent) (1893)
1893	Stanford	8–0–1			
Stanford:		8–0–1			
Haverford (Independent) (1894)
1894	Haverford	0–5			
Haverford:		0–5			
Missouri Tigers (Western Interstate University Football Association) (1895)
1895	Missouri	7–1	2–1	T–1st	
Missouri:		7–1	2–1		
Total:		15–6–1			
National championship Conference title Conference division title or championship game berth
