= Wylie G. Woodruff =

American football player and coach (1866–1930)

- Woodruff in 1898 as the head football coach at Kansas

Biographical details
- Born: March 4, 1866; Tecumseh, Nebraska, U.S.
- Died: June 21, 1930 (aged 64); Portland, Oregon, U.S.

Playing career
- 1888–1891: Kansas City YMCA
- 1893–1896: Penn
- Position: Guard

Coaching career (HC unless noted)
- 1897–1898: Kansas

Head coaching record
- Overall: 15–3

Accomplishments and honors

Awards
- Consensus All-American (1896)

Wylie Glidden Woodruff (March 4, 1866 – June 21, 1930) was an American football player and coach. He played guard at the University of Pennsylvania under his older brother, George Washington Woodruff. He was selected to the 1896 College Football All-America Team during his senior year. After graduation, he served as the head coach at the University of Kansas from 1897 to 1898, compiling a record of 15–4.

== Early life and playing career ==
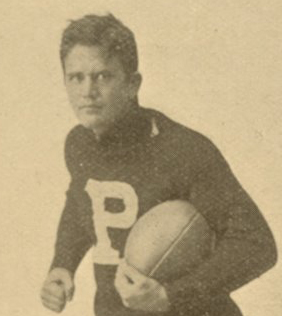
Woodruff in his 1893 Penn football photo

Woodruff was born on March 4, 1866, in Tecumseh, Nebraska to Lewis Harlow Woodruff (June 9, 1836 – December 27, 1871) and Melissa Cormella Woodruff (née Glidden; December 16, 1841 – December 17, 1866). His family moved to Tecumseh, Nebraska from Friendsville, Pennsylvania in 1865 where his father was a dry goods dealer. His mother died at Tecumseh in 1866. Sometime after February 1868 his family moved back east briefly to Binghamton, New York and then to his mother's hometown of Friendsville, Pennsylvania where Woodruff spent most of his childhood. After attending and graduating from public schools in Friendsville, Pennsylvania he moved on to the Mansfield State Normal School in Mansfield, Pennsylvania. The 1880 Census has him living with Dr. Henry P. and Sarah E. née Glidden Hasting (his mother's sister) at Culver Township, Ottawa County, Kansas. He attended Wyoming Seminary in Kingston, Pennsylvania, from which he graduated in 1883. Woodruff then began working in the oil business with his brother George Washington Woodruff first in Cincinnati, Ohio in 1883, then Chicago, Illinois in 1886, and eventually ending up in Kansas City, Missouri in 1887. While in Kansas City, Woodruff played football for the Kansas City YMCA. In 1889 he married Cora E. Bragdon, of Beloit, Kansas, in Kansas City. As a result of the 1890–91 recession he lost his business in the oil industry. Later he was hired as a traveling pickle salesman, a job he held until the fall of 1893. In the fall of 1893 he enrolled at the University of Pennsylvania to study medicine.

=== Kansas City YMCA ===
Woodruff played football for the Kansas City YMCA from 1888 to 1891. During his time playing for the Kansas City YMCA, he played against the school he later became the head football coach of, the University of Kansas, on November 27, 1890, in Kansas City, Missouri. It was only the second game ever played by the Kansas football team. Woodruff and his YMCA team prevailed by a score of 18–10.

=== Penn ===
Woodruff in his 1895 Penn football photo

Woodruff played football for the University of Pennsylvania from 1893 through 1896 while studying to receive his medical degree. He helped Penn to two consecutive undefeated seasons and national championships in 1894 and 1895. His coach at Penn was his older brother, George Washington Woodruff, who remained the head football coach until 1901. During his last year at Penn he was teammates with former KU player and future College Football Hall of Famer and fellow future head football coach at KU, John H. Outland in 1896.

Woodruff was also on the Penn crew team coached by his brother, George, lettering in both 1894 and 1895, and the Penn track and field team lettering in 1896 and 1897 in addition to being a wrestler on the Penn gymnasium team. While on the track and field team he broke the world record in the hammer throw in 1897. He also set the American college record in the shot put while at Penn. Woodruff graduated from Pennsylvania with a degree in medicine in 1897.

== Coaching career ==
=== Kansas ===
After graduating from Penn, Woodruff received an appointment to the United States Army as a contract surgeon at Fort Riley, Kansas, but three months into this assignment he received a leave of absence to become the head football coach for the University of Kansas Jayhawks located in Lawrence, Kansas. When he first arrived at Kansas, he moved in with the players in their training quarters and enforced strict codes of conduct. He was the fourth head football coach for the University of Kansas and he held that position for two seasons, from 1897 until 1898. His coaching record at Kansas was 15–3.

During the summers while in Lawrence, Kansas he was assigned to Fort Riley, Kansas as the post's assistant acting surgeon and he was active in trying to raise troops amongst KU students for the Spanish–American War in 1898. Upon his departure as head football coach at Kansas, Woodruff set up practice as a physician in Lawrence, opening an office at 709 Massachusetts Street in January 1898. He specialized in skin diseases and the removal of moles and other skin blemishes. He remained in Lawrence, practicing medicine until May 1901.

== Controversy ==
In the Fall of 1900 Woodruff filed for divorce from his wife, Cora, but then retracted the filing soon afterwards. Despite the retraction of his divorce filing, he moved out of his home at this time. It was alleged he had been carrying on an affair with another man's wife who had been a patient of his when Woodruff abruptly left Lawrence, Kansas to visit his mistress, Mrs. Edith Moyer, in Kansas City, Missouri. He soon returned to Lawrence, Kansas and announced he had consumption, known today as Tuberculosis, which required him to move west to a drier climate. He quickly closed his medical practice in Lawrence, Kansas and left town for good in May 1901. He then met up with his mistress and her daughter in Chicago, Illinois where they departed for his new home in Portland, Oregon. Mr. Ray Moyer, the husband of his mistress realizing that both his wife and daughter had fled town filed a police report claiming his daughter had been kidnapped by Woodruff and his wife. The Lawrence Chief of Police, chief Hayes, then made out a warrant for Woodruff's arrest which was sent by telegraph to the Chief of Police in Portland, Oregon. Woodruff and his mistress were arrested in Portland, Oregon on May 31, 1901, making national news. The charges were dropped six days later upon the return of Mrs. Moyer's daughter to her soon to be ex-husband, Mr. Ray Moyer, back in Lawrence, Kansas under his permanent custody. Woodruff and Mrs. Edith Moyer later married.

== Later life and death ==
Woodruff and his new wife made Portland, Oregon their home for the rest of their lives. Upon arrival in Portland, he again set up his medical practice, this time specializing in gynecology, obstetrics, and abdominal surgery. With his zest for athletic competition still not squelched, he competed on occasion in local wrestling matches, including a well known match against local professional wrestler, Joe Action. Woodruff famously won the match. Woodruff also played football for seven years for the Multnomah Athletic Club. He founded and operated the Oregon Sanitorium, a private in-patient treatment center. He was active in several clubs and associations in Portland, including the Loyal Order of Moose and the Knights of Pythias, both of which he was a lifetime member, and was an active member of the Alderwood Country Club. Woodruff died in Portland on June 21, 1930. He was survived by his wife, Edith I. Woodruff (née Green), daughter Mrs. Cormella Glidden Yenney (1904 – April 30, 1950), son George Walter Woodruff (November 8, 1906 – October 6, 1987), and grandson George Wylie Yenney (May 23, 1926 – November 16, 1994).

== Head coaching record ==
Year	Team	Overall	Conference	Standing	Bowl/playoffs
Kansas Jayhawks (Western Interstate University Football Association) (1897)
1897	Kansas	8–2	2–1	2nd	
Kansas Jayhawks (Independent) (1898)
1898	Kansas	7–1			
Kansas:		15–3	2–1		
Total:		15–3			
