= Flea Kicker =

Nebraska Cornhuskers	Missouri Tigers
(8–0)	(6–3)
45	38
Head coach: Tom Osborne	Head coach: Larry Smith
AP / Coaches; 1 / 1
	1	2	3	4	OT	Total
Nebraska	14	7	7	10	7	45
Missouri	7	17	7	7	0	38
- Date: November 8, 1997
- Season: 1997
- Stadium: Faurot Field
- Location: Columbia, Missouri
- Favorite: Nebraska by 29
- Referee: John Laurie
- Attendance: 66,846

United States TV coverage
- Network: ABC
- Announcers: Brent Musburger (play-by-play); Dan Fouts (analyst); Jack Arute (sideline)

The 1997 Nebraska vs. Missouri football game was the ninety-first edition of the Missouri–Nebraska rivalry, held on November 8, 1997 at Faurot Field in Columbia, Missouri. It is most remembered for NU's game-tying touchdown as time expired that became known as the "Flea Kicker." Top-ranked Nebraska won in overtime to keep its national championship hopes alive.

== Background ==
Missouri had not ended a season with more wins than losses since 1983, but started 6–3 in 1997 under fourth-year head coach Larry Smith. Quarterback Corby Jones, in his first year as a full-time starter, led the Big 12 in passing efficiency and led an offense averaging 426 yards per game.

Nebraska entered its November trip to Columbia, Missouri, ranked number one in both major polls, leading the country in total offense behind quarterback Scott Frost, I-back Ahman Green, and a strong offensive line. The Cornhuskers, winners of two of the past three national championships and 18 straight games over Missouri, were favored by 29 points.

== Game ==
Both defenses struggled throughout the first half. Missouri's opening score was quickly answered by two Scott Frost touchdown runs. Tied at 14, Nebraska marched 99 yards to retake the lead on a seven-yard touchdown by Ahman Green, who rushed for 129 of his 189 yards in the first half. A field goal brought the Tigers within four, and Corby Jones connected with running back Brock Olivo on a lengthy touchdown on the first play of Missouri's next drive. Nebraska drove into the red zone, but the half ran out on a botched snap with Missouri leading 24–21.

The teams exchanged scoreless drives to begin the second half until the Cornhuskers scored with 3:00 remaining in the third quarter. The lead lasted just minutes, as Missouri retook the lead after a 62-yard kickoff return by Devin West set up a short Jones touchdown. With the game tied at 31 late in the fourth quarter, Jones was intercepted in Nebraska territory, but Frost followed with an interception of his own. On the ensuing Tigers drive, Jones hit a wide-open Eddie Brooks for a go-ahead touchdown with 4:39 remaining, nearly bringing head coach Larry Smith to tears. Missouri forced a three-and-out and was able to run the clock under two minutes before punting, setting up a Nebraska drive from its own 33-yard line with 1:02 remaining.

=== Flea Kicker ===
In less than a minute, the Cornhuskers moved the ball to the Missouri 12-yard line. With seven seconds and no timeouts remaining, Frost threw a pass intended for wingback Shevin Wiggins near the goal line. The ball hit Wiggins in the chest, bouncing straight down and off the foot of safety Julian Jones. It popped back in the air and was kicked into the end zone by Wiggins as he was tackled by Jones. Freshman receiver Matt Davison made a diving catch for a touchdown, narrowly keeping the ball from hitting the ground. Missouri fans stormed the field in celebration, believing the game to be over.

The play would have resulted in a 15-yard penalty if officials deemed Wiggins's kick intentional. Once fans were cleared from the field, Kris Brown kicked the extra point to tie the game – the first overtime game Nebraska ever played. In overtime, Frost's fourth touchdown gave Nebraska a 45–38 lead after just three plays, and a fourth-down Grant Wistrom sack of Jones ended the game.

=== Scoring summary ===
Qtr	Time	Team	Detail	NU	MU
1	9:23	MU	Brock Olivo 1-yd run (Scott Knickman kick)	0	7
1	5:09	NU	Scott Frost 16-yd run (Kris Brown kick)	7	7
1	0:25	NU	Frost 1-yd run (Brown kick)	14	7
2	14:16	MU	Torey Coleman 18-yd pass from Corby Jones (Knickman kick)	14	14
2	10:08	NU	Ahman Green 7-yd run (Brown kick)	21	14
2	5:26	MU	Knickman 39-yd field goal	21	17
2	3:29	MU	Olivo 34-yd pass from Jones (Knickman kick)	21	24
3	3:00	NU	Frost 1-yd run (Brown kick)	28	24
3	0:43	MU	Jones 7-yd run (Knickman kick)	28	31
4	10:50	NU	Brown 44-yd field goal	31	31
4	4:39	MU	Eddie Brooks 15-yd pass from Jones (Knickman kick)	31	38
4	0:00	NU	Matt Davison 12-yd pass from Frost (Brown kick)	38	38
Overtime		NU	Frost 12-yd run (Brown kick)	45	38

== Team statistics ==
Statistic	Nebraska	Missouri
First downs	28	20
Rushes–yards	61–353	46–153
Comp.–att.–yards	11–24–175	12–20–233
Total offense	528	386
Turnovers	3	1
Punts–average	2–35.0	4–27.0
Penalties–yards	5–45	2–10
Time of possession	29:55	30:05

== Aftermath ==
After the game, Wiggins admitted he intentionally kicked the ball to keep it from falling incomplete. The legality of the play remains in question, especially as it is unclear whether Wiggins primarily intended to catch the ball himself or to keep it away from Missouri defenders. Big 12 officiating adviser Frank Gaines stated it was illegal for a receiver to intentionally strike a loose ball with the leg, though officials are instructed to not penalize questionable plays. Players are allowed to use any part of their body to catch the ball themselves.

Corby Jones earned national praise for his performance, accounting for 293 yards of offense and leading the Tigers to thirty-eight points against a defense that had allowed just seven in its previous three games combined. Despite the loss, Missouri entered the AP poll on November 10. The Tigers finished 7–5, losing to Colorado State in the Holiday Bowl but ending the season nationally ranked for the first time since 1981. Smith led Missouri to an 8–4 season in 1998, but was fired in 2000 following consecutive losing seasons. In 2003, Missouri ended its losing streak to Nebraska at twenty-four.

Nebraska dropped to No. 3 behind Florida State and Michigan in both major polls. The Cornhuskers entered the postseason 11–0, still trailing the Wolverines. Dominant wins over Texas A&M in the Big 12 Championship Game and Tennessee in the Orange Bowl vaulted NU to the top of the Coaches poll to earn its third national championship in four seasons, and head coach Tom Osborne retired at the end of the year.

The Flea Kicker has become one of the most famous moments in the history of both programs. It ranked eleventh on The Best Damn Sports Show Period's list of "Top 50 Amazing Catches," and was featured in "Bet You Can't Do It Again", an episode of Sport Science.
