= 1895 Nebraska Bugeaters football team =

American college football season

1895 Nebraska Bugeaters football

WIUFA co-champion Nebraska state champion
- Conference: Western Interstate University Football Association
- Record: 6–3 (2–1 WIUFA)
- Head coach: Charles Thomas (1st season)
- Home stadium: M Street Park

1895 Western Interstate University Football Association standings
	Conf.					Overall
Team	W		L		T	W		L		T
Missouri +	2	–	1	–	0	7	–	1	–	0
Kansas +	2	–	1	–	0	6	–	1	–	0
Nebraska +	2	–	1	–	0	6	–	3	–	0
Iowa	0	–	3	–	0	2	–	5	–	0
+ – Conference co-champions

The 1895 Nebraska Bugeaters football team represented the University of Nebraska in the 1895 college football season. The team was coached by first-year head coach Charles Thomas and played their one home game at the M Street Park in Lincoln, Nebraska. They competed as members of the Western Interstate University Football Association.

Thomas spent two years as an assistant before being promoted to head coach following the departure of Frank Crawford at the conclusion of the 1894 season. After the season, Nebraska's second consecutive WIUFA conference championship, Thomas left to become the head coach at Arkansas.

== Schedule ==
Date	Time	Opponent	Site	Result	Attendance	Source
October 12	4:06 p.m.	at Sioux City AC*	riverfront; Sioux City, IA	W 38–0		
October 16	3:30 p.m.	at Butte AC*	Butte, MT	L 6–16		
October 19		at Denver AC*	Denver, CO	W 12–4		
October 26	3:15 p.m.	at University Club of Omaha*	University Park; Omaha, NE	W 36–0		
November 2	3:30 p.m.	vs. Missouri	University Park; Omaha, NE (rivalry)	W 12–10		
November 16	3:00 p.m.	Kansas	M Street Park; Lincoln, NE (rivalry)	L 4–8	3,000	
November 19	2:45 p.m.	at Doane*	Athletic Park; Crete, NE	W 24–0	600	
November 22		at Grinnell*	Grinnell, IA	L 0–24		
November 28	3:15 p.m.	vs. Iowa	University Park; Omaha, NE (rivalry)	W 6–0	2,000	
*Non-conference game

== Coaching staff ==
Coach	Position	First year	Alma mater
Charles Thomas	Head coach	1895	Michigan
Jack Best	Trainer	1890	Nebraska

== Roster ==
Brandt, Fletcher PLAYER; Cameron, John E; Dern, George T; Dungan, Will T; Fair, Richard FB; Flippin, George HB; Frank, Harry FB; Gardner PLAYER; Hammang, John T; Hayward, William T; Humphrey PLAYER; Jones, Albin G; Jones, Harry G; Kellar, C.E. G; King HB	Matson, Charles PLAYER; Melford, William C; Oury, W.Harry T; Packard, Leonard E; Placek, Emil QB; Reeler PLAYER; Shedd, George HB; Shue, James E; Spooner, Clinton QB; Sweeney, F.W. FB; Thorpe, Orley E; Whipple, Otis E; Wiggins, Frank HB; Wilson, Wilmer G; Yont, Alonzo HB

== Game summaries ==
=== At Sioux City AC ===
Nebraska at Sioux City AC

Team	1	2	Total
• Nebraska			38
Sioux City AC			0

- Date: October 12
- Location: Sioux City, IA

Nebraska's trip to Sioux City was the longest road trip in the program's young history, a record surpassed several times later in the season. Nebraska dominated the game, shutting out Sioux City and setting new program records for points scored and margin of victory.

=== At Butte AC ===
Nebraska at Butte AC

Team	1	2	Total
Nebraska	0	6	6
• Butte AC	12	4	16

- Date: October 16
- Location: Butte, MT

Nebraska again undertook its longest-ever road trip, traveling over 1,000 miles to Butte, Montana to face the Butte Athletic Club. Butte's ball control-heavy game plan meant Nebraska had only one possession in the game's first twenty minutes, and Butte led 12–0 by the half. A late Nebraska touchdown was not enough to overcome the early deficit.

=== At Denver AC ===
Nebraska at Denver AC

Team	1	2	Total
• Nebraska	6	6	12
Denver AC	4	0	4

- Date: October 19
- Location: Denver, CO

The third game between Nebraska and the Denver AC was considerably less emotional than the 1893 matchup, which resulted in Denver choosing to forfeit the contest during the second half. The Bugeaters used a strong run game to control the game and win 12–4.

=== At Omaha ===
Nebraska at Omaha

Team	1	2	Total
• Nebraska	12	24	36
Omaha	0	0	0

- Date: October 26
- Location: Omaha, NE

Nebraska's first game against the University of Nebraska–Omaha was a resounding Bugeaters victory. NU led by 12 at halftime and scored 24 more unanswered points to win 36–0. This was the only game ever played between Nebraska and Omaha.

=== Missouri ===
Nebraska vs. Missouri

Team	1	2	Total
• Nebraska	6	6	12
Missouri	10	0	10

- Date: November 2
- Location: Omaha, NE

Nebraska and Missouri met in Omaha to open the 1895 WIUFA season. The Bugeaters trailed 10–6 at halftime, but scored the second half's only touchdown to win 12–10.

University of Missouri records suggest the final score of this game was a 12–0 Nebraska victory.

=== Kansas ===
Kansas at Nebraska

Team	1	2	Total
• Kansas	0	8	8
Nebraska	0	4	4

- Date: November 16
- Location: M Street Park, Lincoln, NE
- Game attendance: 3,000

Nebraska failed to take advantage of several first-half scoring opportunities, and the game reached halftime tied at zero. Both teams scored a touchdown and missed the following field kick, tying the game at four. Near the end of the game, Nebraska's players reportedly became confused about the amount of time remaining and eased back on their defensive effort, allowing Kansas to score the game-winning touchdown.

=== At Doane ===
Nebraska at Doane

Team	1	2	Total
• Nebraska			24
Doane			0

- Date: November 19
- Location: Crete, NE
- Game attendance: 600
- Game weather: Cold and windy

Nebraska traveled to Crete to meet Doane for the seventh time, dominating the game en route to a 24–0 victory. Wins over Doane and Omaha allowed the Bugeaters to claim a third unofficial Nebraska state championship.

=== At Grinnell ===
Nebraska at Grinnell

Team	1	2	Total
Nebraska	0	0	0
• Grinnell	4	20	24

- Date: November 22
- Location: Grinnell, IA

A year after a 22–0 Nebraska win over Grinnell, the Pioneers returned the favor, shutting out the favored Bugeaters 24–0.

=== Iowa ===
Nebraska vs. Iowa

Team	1	2	Total
• Nebraska	0	6	6
Iowa	0	0	0

- Date: November 28
- Location: Omaha, NE
- Game attendance: 2,000

By 1895, the Nebraska-Iowa contest was being held annually on Thanksgiving Day. The 1895 iteration was a defensive struggle, remaining scoreless until a second-half NU touchdown and subsequent field kick gave the Bugeaters a 6–0 win. The Bugeaters victory, combined with Missouri's defeat of Kansas, resulted in a three-way tie for the WIUFA championship. The tie-breaking system of the time awarded the conference pennant to the team that had allowed the fewest points on the season; this method of selection left Nebraska in third place, but the university later claimed the conference title.

University of Iowa records suggest that this game was played on November 19, 1895.
