= 1893 Missouri Tigers football team =

American college football season

1893 Missouri Tigers football
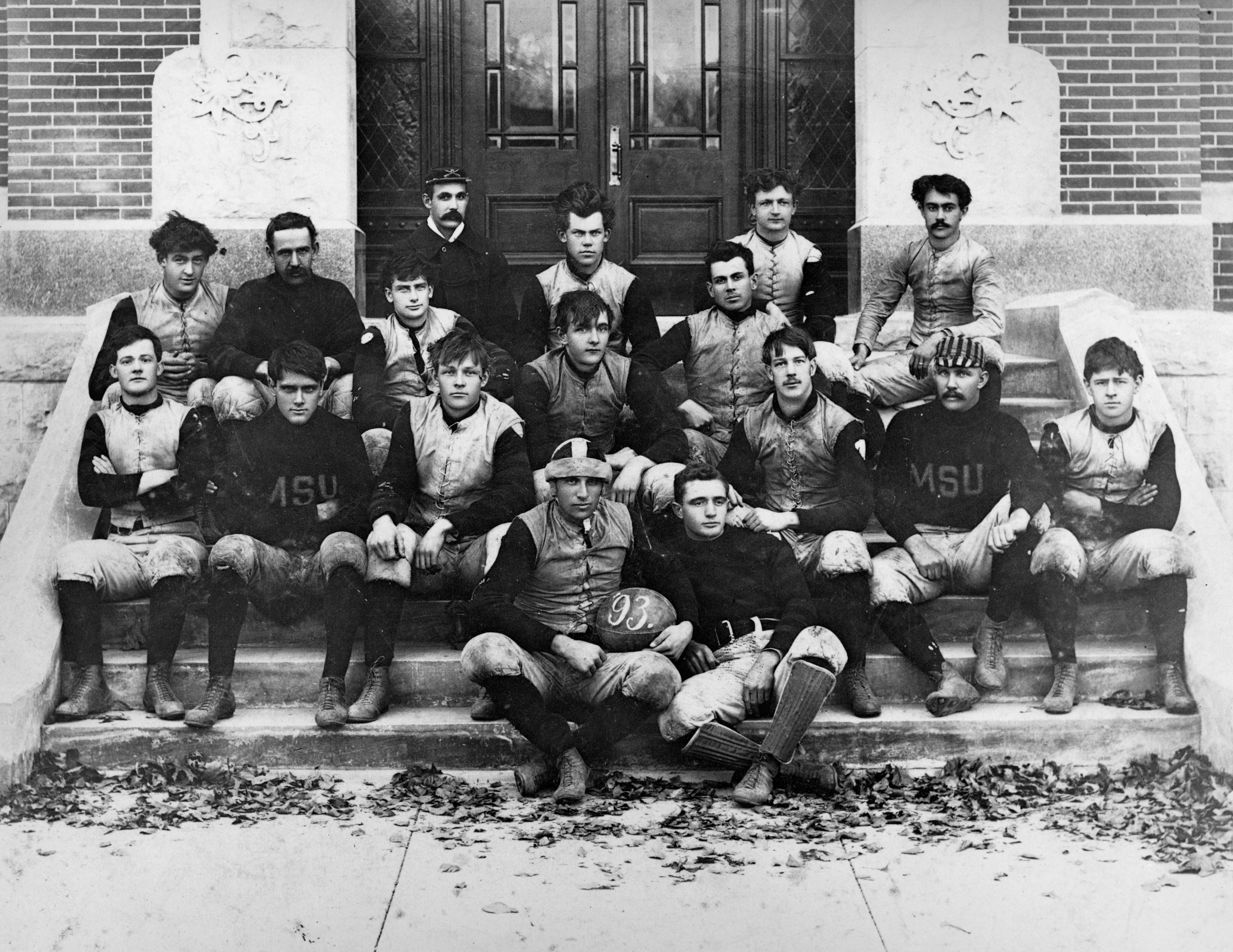

WIUFA co-champion
- Conference: Western Interstate University Football Association
- Record: 4–3 (2–1 WIUFA)
- Head coach: Harry Orman Robinson (1st season)
- Captain: Charles Young

1893 Western Interstate University Football Association standings
	Conf.					Overall
Team	W		L		T	W		L		T
Missouri +	2	–	1	–	0	4	–	3	–	0
Kansas +	2	–	1	–	0	2	–	5	–	0
Nebraska	1	–	2	–	0	3	–	2	–	1
Iowa	1	–	2	–	0	3	–	4	–	0
+ – Conference co-champions

The 1893 Missouri Tigers football team was an American football team that represented the University of Missouri as a member of the Western Interstate University Football Association (WIUFA) during the 1893 college football season. In its first season under head coach Harry Orman Robinson, the team compiled a 4–3 record (2–1 against WIUFA championship) and tied with Kansas for the conference championship.

== Schedule ==
Date	Time	Opponent	Site	Result	Attendance	Source
October 14		vs. Baker*	Exposition Park; Kansas City, MO	L 0–28		
October 22		Denver Athletic Club*	DAC Field; Denver, CO	L 0–40		
November 6		Missouri Valley*	Columbia, MO	W 76–0		
November 11	3:00 p.m.	vs. Nebraska	Exposition Park; Kansas City, MO (rivalry)	W 30–18		
November 18		at Iowa	Iowa Field; Iowa City, IA	L 12–34		
November 25		vs. Pastime Athletic Club*	St. Louis, MO	W 24–12		
November 30	3:00 p.m.	vs. Kansas	Exposition Park; Kansas City, MO (rivalry)	W 12–4	4,000–5,000	
*Non-conference game
