= 1897 Nebraska Bugeaters football team =

American college football season

1897 Nebraska Bugeaters football
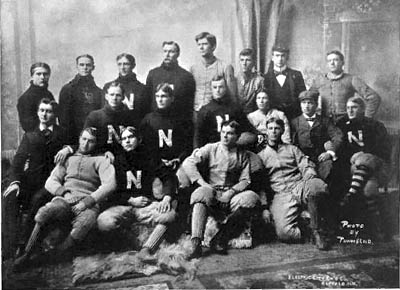

WIUFA champion
- Conference: Western Interstate University Football Association
- Record: 5–1 (3–0 WIUFA)
- Head coach: Edward N. Robinson (2nd season)
- Home stadium: Antelope Field

1897 Western Interstate University Football Association standings
	Conf.					Overall
Team	W		L		T	W		L		T
Nebraska $	3	–	0	–	0	5	–	1	–	0
Kansas	2	–	1	–	0	8	–	2	–	0
Iowa	0	–	2	–	0	4	–	4	–	0
Missouri	0	–	2	–	0	5	–	6	–	0
$ – Conference champion

The 1897 Nebraska Bugeaters football team represented the University of Nebraska in the 1897 college football season. The team was coached by second-year head coach Edward N. Robinson and played their home games at Antelope Field in Lincoln, Nebraska. They competed as members of the Western Interstate University Football Association.

NU went unbeaten in WIUFA play to claim its first outright conference title. Following the season, Robinson accepted the head coaching position at Brown, his alma mater.

== Schedule ==
Date	Time	Opponent	Site	Result	Attendance	Source
October 8		at Iowa Agricultural*	Ames, IA (rivalry)	L 0–10		
October 18	3:30 p.m.	Tarkio*	Antelope Field; Lincoln, NE	W 16–0		
October 23		Nebraska Wesleyan*	Antelope Field; Lincoln, NE	W 10–0		
October 30		Missouri	Antelope Field; Lincoln, NE (rivalry)	W 41–0		
November 13		Kansas	Antelope Field; Lincoln, NE (rivalry)	W 10–5	2,500	
November 19		at Kansas City Medics*	Kansas City, MO	Canceled		
November 25	3:10 p.m.	vs. Iowa	Field Club Park; Council Bluffs, IA (rivalry)	W 6–0		
*Non-conference game

== Coaching staff ==
Coach	Position	First year	Alma mater
Eddie N. Robinson	Head coach	1896	Brown
Jack Best	Trainer	1890	Nebraska
Harry Oury	Manager	1896	Nebraska

== Roster ==
Benedict, Raymond E
Cowgill, Howard QB
Halstead, M.L. G
Hansen, Albert LG
Hayward, William LT
Herbert C
Hisey, Albert G
Melford, William C
Montgomery, Robert RT
Oury, W. Harry C
Pearse, Arthur RT
Schwartz, Maynard HB
Shedd, George FB
Stringer, Lewis LT
Swartz, Maynard HB
Tukey, Harry QB
Turner, Edmund RG
Westover, John C
Wiggins, Frank E
Williams, Charles Erwin HB

Starters

Position	Player
Quarterback	Howard Cowgill
Left halfback	Raymond Benedict
Right halfback	Robert Montgomery
Fullback	George Shedd
Left end	Lewis Stringer
Left tackle	Arthur Pearse
Left guard	Albert Hansen
Center	William Melford
Right guard	Edmund Turner
Right tackle	William Hayward
Right end	Frank Wiggins

== Game summaries ==
=== At Iowa Agricultural ===
Nebraska at Iowa Agricultural

Team	1	2	Total
Nebraska			0
• Iowa Agricultural			10

- Date: October 8
- Location: State Field, Ames, IA
- Game weather: Windy

Nebraska was unable to keep pace with the Cyclones in the second-ever meeting between the schools. NU was not helped by strong winds that died down in the second half when it would have benefited the Bugeaters.

=== Tarkio ===
Tarkio at Nebraska

Team	1	2	Total
Tarkio	0	0	0
• Nebraska	6	10	16

- Date: October 18
- Location: Antelope Field, Lincoln, NE

This was the first meeting between Nebraska and Tarkio, and also the first game ever played on campus at the University of Nebraska. On this day, the new field (later known as Antelope Field) was extremely muddy, and conditions were only marginally improved by pre-game efforts to make it playable. Nebraska dominated the game anyway, not allowing Tarkio to move the ball inside NU's 30-yard line.

=== Nebraska Wesleyan ===
Nebraska Wesleyan at Nebraska

Team	1	2	Total
Nebraska Wesleyan	0	0	0
• Nebraska	0	10	10

- Date: October 23
- Location: Antelope Field, Lincoln, NE

When Nebraska Wesleyan arrived, it was unclear if the game would be played, as they did not have enough players to field a full team. A bid to have Wesleyan's head coach play, a solution often used in past years, was denied as against league rules. Wesleyan eventually resolved the problem by adding a local high school player to their roster for the day, and Nebraska agreed to shorten the game to two 15-minute halves. Wesleyan kept Nebraska off the scoreboard in the first half, but the undermatched visitors could not keep up in the second half.

=== Missouri ===
Missouri at Nebraska

Team	1	2	Total
Missouri			0
• Nebraska			41

- Date: October 30
- Location: Antelope Field, Lincoln, NE

Nebraska scored four times in the first half in the WIUFA conference opener to put the game out of reach early on. The Bugeaters kept scoring in the second half to set new program records for points in a game and margin of victory in a 41–0 victory.

=== Kansas ===
Kansas at Nebraska

Team	1	2	Total
Kansas	5	0	5
• Nebraska	5	5	10

- Date: November 13
- Location: Antelope Field, Lincoln, NE

Prior to kickoff, disagreement began over officiating representative selected by Kansas. The Bugeaters repeatedly protested calls, and a Kansas field kick that many spectators claimed missed the mark was ruled good; at this point Nebraska chose to play under protest. The continual disruptions delayed the game's progress, and it was eventually called on account of darkness following a lengthy Kansas argument about a late Nebraska touchdown. Nebraska won 10–5, and Kansas demanded a rematch, but it was never scheduled.

University of Kansas records suggest the final score of this game was a 6–5 Nebraska victory.

=== At Kansas City Medics ===
Nebraska at KC Medics

Team	1	2	Total
Nebraska			N/A
Kansas City Medics			N/A

- Date: November 19
- Location: Kansas City, MO

The death of a Commandant Jackson resulted in this game being canceled, though it is not clear which team or school he was associated with. The game was initially rescheduled for December 5 but was never played.

=== Iowa ===
Nebraska vs. Iowa

Team	1	2	Total
• Nebraska			6
Iowa			0

- Date: November 25
- Location: Field Club Park, Council Bluffs, IA

Some sources indicate Iowa failed to follow league requirements prior to the start of the season, which disqualified them as participants; however, league standings from the time list Iowa as a full WIUFA participant in 1897. Nebraska managed a single touchdown against the Hawkeyes, which was enough to win the game 6–0. NU swept its conference opponents and claimed the first outright league title in program history.
