= 1897 Iowa Hawkeyes football team =

American college football season

1897 Iowa Hawkeyes football
- Conference: Western Interstate University Football Association
- Record: 4–4 (0–2 WIUFA)
- Head coach: Otto Wagonhurst (1st season)
- Captain: James C. Walker
- Home stadium: Iowa Field

1897 Western Interstate University Football Association standings
	Conf.					Overall
Team	W		L		T	W		L		T
Nebraska $	3	–	0	–	0	5	–	1	–	0
Kansas	2	–	1	–	0	8	–	2	–	0
Iowa	0	–	2	–	0	4	–	4	–	0
Missouri	0	–	2	–	0	5	–	6	–	0
$ – Conference champion

The 1897 Iowa Hawkeyes football team was an American football team that represented the State University of Iowa ("S.U.I."), now commonly known as the University of Iowa, as a member of the Western Interstate University Football Association (WIUFA) during the 1897 college football season. In their first and only year under head coach Otto Wagonhurst, the Hawkeyes compiled a 4–4 record (0–2 in conference games), tied for last place in the WIUFA, and were outscored by a total of 104 to 67.

James C. Walker, a guard, was the team captain. The team played it home games at Iowa Field in Iowa City, Iowa.

== Schedule ==
Date	Time	Opponent	Site	Result	Source
October 2		Wilton*	Iowa Field; Iowa City, IA	W 22–4	
October 16		at Northwestern*	Sheppard Field; Evanston, IL	W 12–6	
October 23		Chicago Physicians and Surgeons*	Iowa Field; Iowa City, IA	L 0–14	
October 30	3:00 p.m.	at Kansas	McCook Field; Lawrence, KS	L 0–56	
November 5		Iowa Agricultural*	Iowa Field; Iowa City, IA (rivalry)	L 0–6	
November 13		at Drake*	Des Moines, IA	W 16–0	
November 20		Grinnell*	Iowa Field; Iowa City, IA	W 16–12	
November 25	3:10 p.m.	vs. Nebraska	Field Club Park; Council Bluffs, IA (rivalry)	L 0–6	
*Non-conference game

== Players ==
- Ralph Blackmore, guard, 195 pounds
- William Chase
- Moray Eby, end, 155 pounds
- John Gardner, tackle, 175 pounds
- John G. Griffith, quarterback, 135 pounds
- Samuel Hobbs, fullback, 160 pounds
- William F. Kelly, 155 pounds
- Theodore Klingenberg, 175 pounds
- William Lamerton (or Lamberton), end, 155 pounds
- Melvin Meister, end, 150 pounds
- Joseph Meyers, halfback, 178 pounds
- G.M. Middleton, end
- Towle, tackle
- James C. Walker, guard and captain, 190 pounds
- Charles Wright, center, 222 pounds
