= 1894 Kansas Jayhawks football team =

American college football season

1894 Kansas Jayhawks football
- Conference: Western Interstate University Football Association
- Record: 2–3–1 (1–2 WIUFA)
- Head coach: Hector Cowan (1st season)
- Captain: O. K. Williamson
- Home stadium: McCook Field

1894 Western Interstate University Football Association standings
	Conf.					Overall
Team	W		L		T	W		L		T
Missouri +	2	–	1	–	0	4	–	3	–	0
Nebraska +	2	–	1	–	0	6	–	2	–	0
Kansas	1	–	2	–	0	2	–	3	–	1
Iowa	1	–	2	–	0	4	–	4	–	1
+ – Conference co-champions

The 1894 Kansas Jayhawks football team represented the University of Kansas in the Western Interstate University Football Association (WIUFA) during the 1894 college football season. In their first season under head coach Hector Cowan, the Jayhawks compiled a 2–3–1 record (1–2 against conference opponents), finished third in the conference, and were outscored by all opponents by a combined total of 82 to 78. The Jayhawks played home games at McCook Field in Lawrence, Kansas. O. K. Williamson was the team captain.

== Schedule ==
Date	Time	Opponent	Site	Result	Attendance	Source
October 13	3:00 p.m.	Doane*	McCook Field; Lawrence, KS	W 22–12		
October 27		Ottawa*	McCook Field; Lawrence, KS	T 6–6	1,800–4,000	
November 3	3:00 p.m.	at Iowa	Iowa Field; Iowa City, IA	L 14–18		
November 10		vs. Michigan*	Exposition Park; Kansas City, MO	L 12–22	5,000	
November 17	3:50 p.m.	Nebraska	McCook Field; Lawrence, KS (rivalry)	L 6–12	1,500	
November 29	3:10 p.m.	vs. Missouri	Exposition Park; Kansas City, MO (rivalry)	W 18–12	10,000	
*Non-conference game
