= 1895 Iowa Hawkeyes football team =

American college football season

1895 Iowa Hawkeyes football
- Conference: Western Interstate University Football Association
- Record: 2–5 (0–3 WIUFA)
- Head coach: None
- Captain: Kalita Leighton
- Home stadium: Iowa Field

1895 Western Interstate University Football Association standings
	Conf.					Overall
Team	W		L		T	W		L		T
Missouri +	2	–	1	–	0	7	–	1	–	0
Kansas +	2	–	1	–	0	6	–	1	–	0
Nebraska +	2	–	1	–	0	6	–	3	–	0
Iowa	0	–	3	–	0	2	–	5	–	0
+ – Conference co-champions

The 1895 Iowa Hawkeyes football team represented the State University of Iowa ("S.U.I."), now commonly known as the University of Iowa, as a member of the Western Interstate University Football Association (WIUFA) during the 1895 college football season. The team compiled a 2–5 record (0–3 in conference games), finished in last place in the WIUFA, and was outscored by a total of 138 to 42. It was the last Hawkeye football team to go without a head coach when the university decided to forgo hiring a professional football coach. The plan backfired, and although the team posted victories over Parsons and Penn College, they failed to score in each of their five losses. The next year, Iowa hired Alfred E. Bull as their coach.

The team was the first racially-integrated Iowa football team, as Frank Kinney Holbrook became the team's first African-American player. Holbrook was later inducted into the Iowa Letterwinners Club Hall of Fame.

Guard Kalita Leighton was the team captain. The team played its home games at Iowa Field at Iowa City, Iowa.

== Schedule ==
Date	Time	Opponent	Site	Result	Attendance	Source
October 12		Doane*	Iowa Field; Iowa City, IA	L 0–10		
October 19		at Parsons*	Fairfield, IA	W 28–0		
October 28		Iowa Agricultural*	Iowa Field; Iowa City, IA (rivalry)	L 0–24		
November 2	3:00 p.m.	at Kansas	McCook Field; Lawrence, KS	L 0–52	4,000	
November 18		at Missouri	Rollins Field; Columbia, MO	L 0–34		
November 19		at Penn (IA)*	Oskaloosa, IA	W 14–12		
November 28	3:15 p.m.	vs. Nebraska	University Park; Omaha, NE (rivalry)	L 0–6	2,000	
*Non-conference game

== Players ==
- William Allison, end
- Burns, end
- Paul Coldren, quarterback
- Stevens Coldren, halfback
- Elmer Cutting, guard
- Charles Edmonds
- Richard Gaines, halfback
- John Gardner
- Samuel Hobbs, fullback/halfback
- Frank Kinney Holbrook, end
- Iver Iverson, center
- Richard Kepler, fullback
- Kalita Leighton, guard/tackle and captain
- Ernest Maine, quarterback
- Howard Powers, tackle
- James Stanton, tackle
- Charles Thomas
- James C. Walker, guard
