= 1897 Kansas Jayhawks football team =

American college football season

1897 Kansas Jayhawks football
- Conference: Western Interstate University Football Association
- Record: 8–2 (2–1 WIUFA)
- Head coach: Wylie G. Woodruff (1st season)
- Captain: A. R. Kennedy
- Home stadium: McCook Field

1897 Western Interstate University Football Association standings
	Conf.					Overall
Team	W		L		T	W		L		T
Nebraska $	3	–	0	–	0	5	–	1	–	0
Kansas	2	–	1	–	0	8	–	2	–	0
Iowa	0	–	2	–	0	4	–	4	–	0
Missouri	0	–	2	–	0	5	–	6	–	0
$ – Conference champion

The 1897 Kansas Jayhawks football team represented the University of Kansas in the Western Interstate University Football Association during the 1897 college football season. In their first season under head coach Wylie G. Woodruff, the Jayhawks compiled an 8–2 record (2–1 against conference opponents), finished second in the conference, shut out seven of ten opponents, and outscored all opponents by a combined total of 253 to 16. The Jayhawks played home games at McCook Field in Lawrence, Kansas. A. R. Kennedy was the team captain.

== Schedule ==
Date	Time	Opponent	Site	Result	Attendance	Source
October 2		Haskell*	McCook Field; Lawrence, KS	W 40–0		
October 6	10:00 a.m.	at Kansas City Medics*	Exposition Park; Kansas City, MO	W 22–8	2,500	
October 9	2:15 p.m.	Midland*	Fair grounds; Lawrence, KS	W 40–0		
October 16	2:30 p.m.	Warrensburg Normal*	McCook Field; Lawrence, KS	W 23–0		
October 23	2:00 p.m.	at Glasco*	Glasco, KS	W 23–0	1,000	
October 30	3:00 p.m.	Iowa	McCook Field; Lawrence, KS	W 56–0		
November 3		at St. Mary's (KS)*	College grounds; St. Marys, KS	W 28–0	300	
November 13		Nebraska	Antelope Field; Lincoln, NE (rivalry)	L 5–10	2,500	
November 20	2:47 p.m.	at Kansas City Medics*	Exposition Park; Kansas City, MO	L 0–2	1,500	
November 25	2:52 p.m.	vs. Missouri	Exposition Park; Kansas City, MO (rivalry)	W 16–0	4,000	
*Non-conference game
