= 1997 Holiday Bowl =

1997 Plymouth Holiday Bowl
| Colorado State Rams | Missouri Tigers |
| (10–2) | (7–4) |
| WAC | Big 12 |
| 35 | 24 |
| Head coach: Sonny Lubick | Head coach: Larry Smith |
| AP / Coaches / BA; 18 / 17 / 18 | AP / Coaches / BA; 19 / 20 / 20 |
| | 1 | 2 | 3 | 4 | Total |
|---|---|---|---|---|---|
| Colorado State | 7 | 7 | 14 | 7 | 35 |
| Missouri | 3 | 14 | 7 | 0 | 24 |
- Date: December 29, 1997
- Season: 1997
- Stadium: Qualcomm Stadium
- Location: San Diego, California
- MVP: Offensive: Moses Moreno (Colorado State)
- Halftime show: Marching bands
- Attendance: 50,761
- Payout: US$1,409,533 per team

United States TV coverage
- Network: ESPN
- Announcers: Rich Waltz and Rod Gilmore

The 1997 Holiday Bowl was a college football bowl game played December 29, 1997, in San Diego, California. It was part of the 1997 NCAA Division I-A football season. It featured the Colorado State Rams from the Western Athletic Conference, and the Missouri Tigers from the Big 12 Conference.

Colorado State opened the scoring following a 14-yard touchdown run from running back Darran Hall, giving CSU an early 7–0 lead. Scott Knickman got Missouri on the board after he drilled a 32-yard field goal, getting Missouri within 7–3. In the second quarter, Missouri scored on a 4-yard touchdown run from quarterback Corby Jones, giving the Tigers a 10–7 lead.

Colorado State quarterback Moses Moreno found wide receiver Corey McCoy for a 22-yard touchdown pass, and Colorado State reclaimed the lead at 14–10. Missouri's Ernest Blackwell scored on a 7-yard touchdown run, again shifting the lead to the Tigers, 17–14.

In the third quarter, Colorado State reclaimed the lead following an 85-yard punt return from Darren Hall, putting the Rams up 21–17. Moses Moreno later found wide receiver Dallas Davis on a 47-yard pass to increase Colorado State's lead to 28–17. Missouri's Brock Olivo scored on a 3-yard touchdown run, pulling Missouri to within 28–24. Ryan Eslinger's 23-yard touchdown run gave Colorado State a 35–24 lead, and the final score held up.
