= 1893 Kansas Jayhawks football team =

American college football season

1893 Kansas Jayhawks football
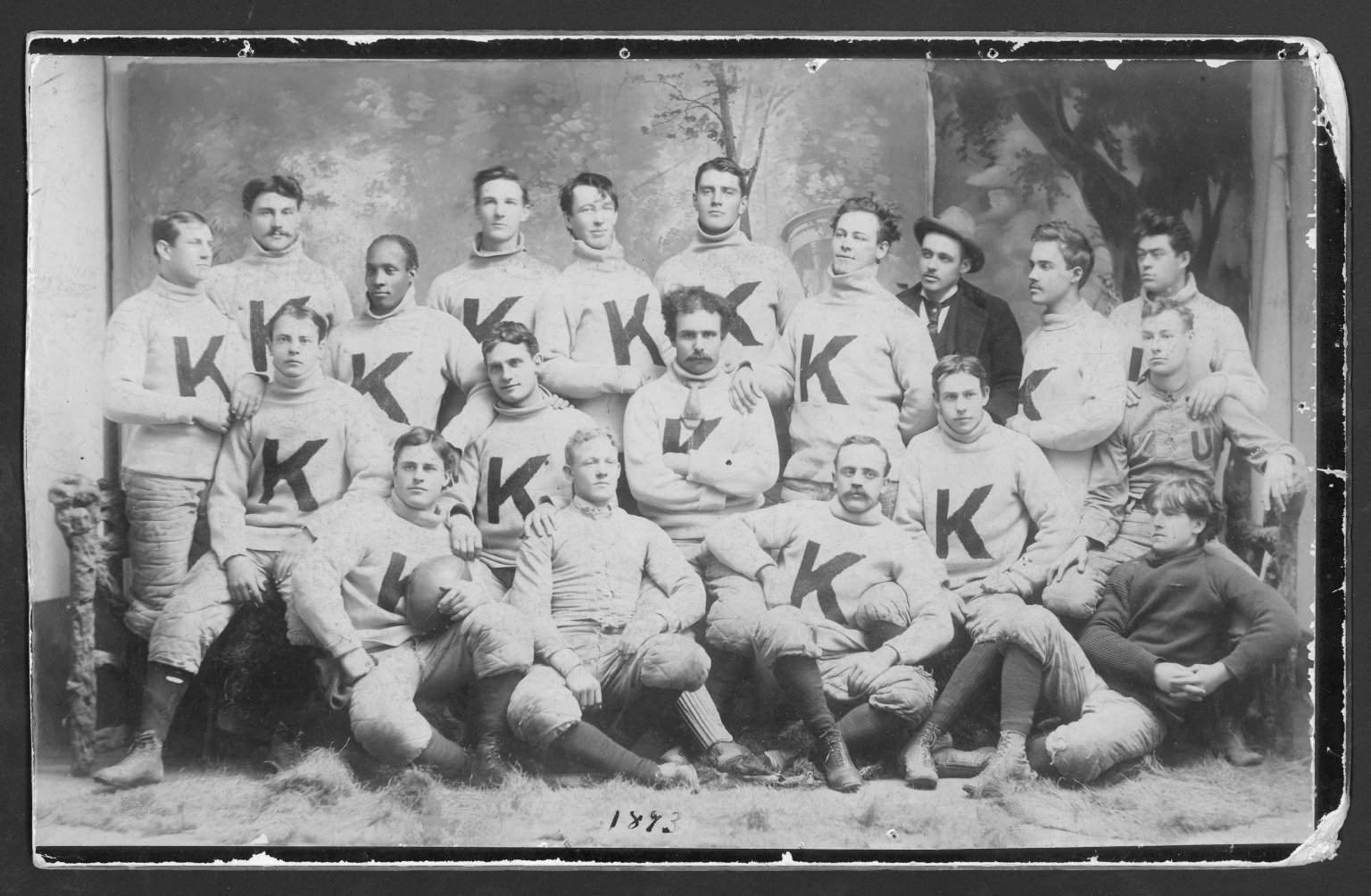

WIUFA co-champion
- Conference: Western Interstate University Football Association
- Record: 2–5 (2–1 WIUFA)
- Head coach: A. W. Shepard (2nd season)
- Captain: A. R. Champlin
- Home stadium: McCook Field

1893 Western Interstate University Football Association standings
| | Conf. | | | | | Overall |
| Team | W | | L | | T | W | | L | | T |
|---|---|---|---|---|---|---|---|---|---|---|
| Missouri + | 2 | – | 1 | – | 0 | 4 | – | 3 | – | 0 |
| Kansas + | 2 | – | 1 | – | 0 | 2 | – | 5 | – | 0 |
| Nebraska | 1 | – | 2 | – | 0 | 3 | – | 2 | – | 1 |
| Iowa | 1 | – | 2 | – | 0 | 3 | – | 4 | – | 0 |
+ – Conference co-champions

The 1893 Kansas Jayhawks football team represented the University of Kansas in the Western Interstate University Football Association (WIUFA) during the 1893 college football season. In their second and final season under head coach A. W. Shepard. Despite finishing with a 2–5 overall record and being outscored by their opponents by a combined total of 108 to 85, the Jayhawks were WIUFA co-champions due to their 2–1 conference record. The Jayhawks one home game at McCook Field in Lawrence, Kansas. A. R. Champlin was the team captain.

== Schedule ==
| Date | Time | Opponent | Site | Result | Attendance | Source |
|---|---|---|---|---|---|---|
| October 14 | 3:15 p.m. | at Minnesota* | Minneapolis ball park grounds; Minneapolis, MN | L 6–12 | | |
| October 21 | 2:37 p.m. | Baker* | McCook Field; Lawrence, KS | L 12–14 | | |
| October 28 | | at Denver Athletic Club* | Denver, CO | L 10–24 | | |
| November 4 | 3:00 p.m. | vs. Iowa | Exposition Park; Kansas City, MO | W 35–24 | | |
| November 18 | | at Nebraska | Lincoln Park; Lincoln, NE (rivalry) | W 18–0 | | |
| November 25 | 3:15 p.m. | vs. Michigan* | Fairmount Oval; Kansas City, MO | L 0–22 | 3,000 | |
| November 30 | 3:00 p.m. | vs. Missouri | Exposition Park; Kansas City, MO (rivalry) | L 4–12 | 4,000–5,000 | |
*Non-conference game
