= Frank Patterson (American football) =

American football player and coach (1873–1939)

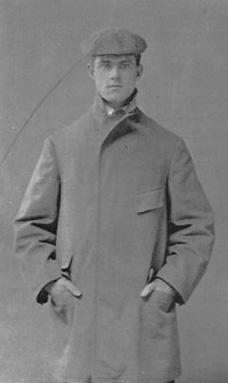

Biographical details
- Born: June 29, 1873; Albany, New York, U.S.
- Died: April 10, 1939 (aged 65); New York, New York, U.S.

Playing career
- 1895: Yale
- Position: End

Coaching career (HC unless noted)
- 1896: Missouri

Head coaching record
- Overall: 7–5

Frank Miner Patterson (June 29, 1873 – April 10, 1939) was an American college football player and coach. He was the sixth head football coach for the University of Missouri in Columbia, Missouri, serving for one season, in 1896, and compiling a record of 7–5. Patterson was an alumnus of Yale University, where he played football as an end.

== Head coaching record ==
Year	Team	Overall	Conference	Standing	Bowl/playoffs
Missouri Tigers (Independent) (1896)
1896	Missouri	7–5			
Missouri:		7–5			
Total:		7–5			
