= 1895 Kansas Jayhawks football team =

American college football season

1895 Kansas Jayhawks football

WIUFA co-champion
- Conference: Western Interstate University Football Association
- Record: 6–1 (2–1 WIUFA)
- Head coach: Hector Cowan (2nd season)
- Captain: W. H. Piatt
- Home stadium: McCook Field

1895 Western Interstate University Football Association standings
	Conf.					Overall
Team	W		L		T	W		L		T
Missouri +	2	–	1	–	0	7	–	1	–	0
Kansas +	2	–	1	–	0	6	–	1	–	0
Nebraska +	2	–	1	–	0	6	–	3	–	0
Iowa	0	–	3	–	0	2	–	5	–	0
+ – Conference co-champions

The 1895 Kansas Jayhawks football team represented the University of Kansas in the Western Interstate University Football Association (WIUFA) during the 1895 college football season. In their second season under head coach Hector Cowan, the Jayhawks compiled a 6–1 record (2–1 against WIUFA opponents), tied for the WIUFA championship, shut out five of seven opponents, and outscored all opponents by a combined total of 192 to 14. The team's only loss came against Missouri in the seasons's final game. The Jayhawks played home games at McCook Field in Lawrence, Kansas. W. H. Piatt was the team captain.

== Schedule ==
Date	Time	Opponent	Site	Result	Attendance	Source
September 26	2:30 p.m.	at Midland*	Midland athletic field; Atchison, KS	W 28–0		
October 5	3:00 p.m.	Midland*	McCook Field; Lawrence, KS	W 56–0		
October 12	3:30 p.m.	at College of Emporia*	Soden's Grove; Emporia, KS	W 10–0		
November 2	3:00 p.m.	Iowa	McCook Field; Lawrence, KS	W 52–0	4,000	
November 9	3:07 p.m.	vs. Doane*	Exposition Park; Kansas City, MO	W 32–0	1,000	
November 16	3:00 p.m.	at Nebraska	"M" Street Park; Lincoln, NE (rivalry)	W 8–4	3,000	
November 28	2:40 p.m.	vs. Missouri	Exposition Park; Kansas City, MO (rivalry)	L 6–10	10,000	
*Non-conference game
