= 1896 Missouri Tigers football team =

American college football season

1896 Missouri Tigers football
- Conference: Western Interstate University Football Association
- Record: 7–5 (0–3 WIUFA)
- Head coach: Frank Patterson (1st season)
- Captain: Thomas R. Shawhan
- Home stadium: Rollins Field

1896 Western Interstate University Football Association standings
	Conf.					Overall
Team	W		L		T	W		L		T
Iowa $	2	–	0	–	1	7	–	1	–	1
Kansas	2	–	1	–	0	7	–	3	–	0
Nebraska	1	–	1	–	1	6	–	3	–	1
Missouri	0	–	3	–	0	7	–	5	–	0
$ – Conference champion

The 1896 Missouri Tigers football team was an American football team that represented the University of Missouri as an independent during the 1896 college football season. In its first and only season under head coach Frank Patterson, the team compiled a 7–5 record.

== Schedule ==
Date	Time	Opponent	Site	Result	Attendance	Source
October 2		Iowa Agricultural	Rollins Field; Columbia, MO (rivalry)	L 0–12		
October 12		Tarkio	Rollins Field; Columbia, MO	W 72–0		
October 17	2:30 p.m.	vs. Illinois	Pastime Grounds; St. Louis, MO (rivalry)	L 0–10		
October 26		Nebraska	Rollins Field; Columbia, MO (rivalry)	L 4–8		
November 7	2:30 p.m.	vs. Vanderbilt	Fair Grounds Race Track; St. Louis, MO	W 26–6		
November 9		Iowa	Rollins Field; Columbia, MO	L 0–12		
November 14		at Wentworth Military	Academy Grounds; Lexington, MO	W 42–0		
November 26	2:30 p.m.	vs. Kansas	Exposition Park; Kansas City, MO (rivalry)	L 0–30	15,000	
December 12		at Dallas Athletic Club	Cycle Park; Dallas, TX	W 28–0	3,000	
December 14	3:45 p.m.	at Texas	Varsity Athletic Field; Austin, TX	W 10–0		
December 17	3:30 p.m.	at Austin Mutes	Varsity Athletic Field; Austin, TX	W 39–0		
December 19	3:30 p.m.	at San Antonio YMCA	Jockey Club Grounds; San Antonio, TX	W 29–0		
December 21		at King Wilhelm's Royals	Beach Park; Galveston, TX	Cancelled		
December 23	3:30 p.m.	at Austin YMCA	Austin TX	W 18–0 (exhibition)		
December 25		vs. Texas	Athletic Club Grounds; Monterrey, Mexico	W 12–0 (exhibition)	3,000	
December 29		vs. Texas	Indianilla grounds; Mexico City, Mexico	T 0–0 (exhibition)		
January 2	10:00 a.m.	vs. Texas	Bicycle Park; Laredo, TX	W 18–6 (exhibition)	300	
