= Corby Jones =

American gridiron football player (born 1978)

No. 7
- Position: Quarterback

Personal information
- Born: March 8, 1978 (age 48)
- Listed height: 5 ft 11 in (1.80 m)
- Listed weight: 223 lb (101 kg)

Career information
- College: Missouri

Career history
- 1999: Montreal Alouettes

Awards and highlights
- First-team All-Big 12 (1997); Second-team All-Big 12 (1998)

Corby Jones (born March 8, 1978) is a former quarterback for the Montreal Alouettes of the Canadian Football League (CFL). He played college football for the Missouri Tigers. During his two seasons as starter (1997–1998), Jones led the Tigers to their first two winning seasons in 13 years.

== College career ==
Jones joined the Tigers' football team as the backup quarterback in 1995. Halfway through his freshman year, he lost his redshirt in a game against the Nebraska Cornhuskers. Even after being stripped of his redshirt, he entered a three-man contest for the starting quarterback job. Jones got his chance to start for Mizzou in 1997. In his first season as starter, Jones led the team to a 7-5 record, its first winning season in 13 years. He is perhaps best remembered for his outstanding performance in the famous Flea Kicker game against Nebraska, nearly leading the Tigers to an upset of the #1-ranked Cornhuskers. He followed that up with an 8-4 record in 1998.

== Professional career ==
Upon finishing up his senior season at Mizzou, Jones entered the 1999 NFL draft as a projected 6th or 7th-round draft pick. He ultimately went undrafted, and his professional career ended after playing sparingly for the Montreal Alouettes in 1999.

== Post-football life ==
Jones graduated from the University of Missouri School of Law with a Juris Doctor in 2003. Jones officially joined the Fox Sports Net crew on July 24, 2008. In 2012, Jones founded law firm Jones Jennings, P.C. with partners Quentin Jennings and Kirra Jones. . The firm disbanded in 2013
