= 1896 Kansas Jayhawks football team =

American college football season

1896 Kansas Jayhawks football
- Conference: Western Interstate University Football Association
- Record: 7–3 (2–1 WIUFA)
- Head coach: Hector Cowan (3rd season)
- Captain: B. D. Hamill
- Home stadium: McCook Field

1896 Western Interstate University Football Association standings
	Conf.					Overall
Team	W		L		T	W		L		T
Iowa $	2	–	0	–	1	7	–	1	–	1
Kansas	2	–	1	–	0	7	–	3	–	0
Nebraska	1	–	1	–	1	6	–	3	–	1
Missouri	0	–	3	–	0	7	–	5	–	0
$ – Conference champion

The 1896 Kansas Jayhawks football team represented the University of Kansas in the Western Interstate University Football Association (WIUFA) during the 1896 college football season. In their third and final season under head coach Hector Cowan, the Jayhawks compiled a 7–3 record (2–1 against conference opponents), finished in second place in the WIUFA, and outscored all opponents by a combined total of 136 to 40. The Jayhawks played home games at McCook Field in Lawrence, Kansas. B. D. Hamill was the team captain.

== Schedule ==
Date	Time	Opponent	Site	Result	Attendance	Source
September 26		at Haskell*	Lawrence, KS	W 32–0		
October 3		Abilene*	McCook Field; Lawrence, KS	W 6–0		
October 10		College of Emporia*	McCook Field; Lawrence, KS	W 26–0	150	
October 17		at Denver Athletic Club*	Denver, CO	W 8–6		
October 26		at Iowa	Iowa Field; Iowa City, IA	L 0–6	2,000	
October 31	3:00 p.m.	at Kansas City Medics*	Exposition Park; Kansas City, MO	L 0–8	1,000	
November 7	3:00 p.m.	Nebraska	McCook Field; Lawrence, KS (rivalry)	W 18–14	1,200	
November 14	3:00 p.m.	Doane*	McCook Field; Lawrence, KS	W 16–4		
November 26	2:30 p.m.	vs. Missouri	Exposition Park; Kansas City, MO (rivalry)	W 30–0	15,000	
November 28	2:30 p.m.	vs. Minnesota*	Exposition Park; Kansas City, MO	L 0–12		
*Non-conference game
