= 1896 Iowa Hawkeyes football team =

American college football season

1896 Iowa Hawkeyes football

WIUFA champion
- Conference: Western Interstate University Football Association
- Record: 7–1–1 (3–0–1 WIUFA)
- Head coach: Alfred E. Bull (1st season)
- Home stadium: Iowa Field

1896 Western Interstate University Football Association standings
	Conf.					Overall
Team	W		L		T	W		L		T
Iowa $	2	–	0	–	1	7	–	1	–	1
Kansas	2	–	1	–	0	7	–	3	–	0
Nebraska	1	–	1	–	1	6	–	3	–	1
Missouri	0	–	3	–	0	7	–	5	–	0
$ – Conference champion

The 1896 Iowa Hawkeyes football team was an American football team that represented the State University of Iowa ("S.U.I."), now commonly known as the University of Iowa, as a member of the Western Interstate University Football Association (WIUFA) during the 1896 college football season. In their first and only year under head coach Alfred E. Bull, the Hawkeyes compiled a 7–1–1 record (3–0–1 in conference games), won the WIUFA championship, shut out seven of nine opponents, and outscored all opponents by a total of 132 to 12. It was the first Iowa football team to win a conference championship. The Hawkeyes defeated Kansas, Missouri, and Nebraska; their sole loss was to Chicago.

Frank Kinney Holbrook, who played end on the 1895 and 1896 teams, was Iowa's first African-American football player. He was later inducted into the Iowa Letterwinners Club Hall of Fame.

Iver Iverson, who played center, was the team captain. The team played its home games at Iowa Field in Iowa City, Iowa.

== Schedule ==
Date	Time	Opponent	Site	Result	Attendance	Source
October 3		Drake*	Iowa Field; Iowa City, IA	W 32–0		
October 10		at Chicago*	Marshall Field; Chicago, IL	L 0–6		
October 26		Kansas	Iowa Field; Iowa City, IA	W 6–0	2,000	
November 4		Wilton*	Iowa Field; Iowa City, IA	W 27–0		
November 9		at Missouri	Rollins Field; Columbia, MO	W 12–0		
November 14		at Grinnell*	Grinnell, IA	W 15–6		
November 21		at Des Moines YMCA*	Des Moines, IA	W 34–0		
November 26	3:30 p.m	vs. Nebraska	University Park; Omaha, NE (rivalry)	T 0–0		
November 28	3:00 p.m	vs. Nebraska	University Park; Omaha, NE	W 6–0		
*Non-conference game

== Players ==
- Ralph Blackmore, guard
- Paul Coldren, quarterback
- Charles Edmonds
- Richard Gaines
- John Gardner
- Festus Griffin, quarterback
- Samuel Hobbs, fullback
- Carleton Holbrook, halfback
- Iver Iverson, center and captain
- Kalita Leighton, guard/tackle
- Harry McNeil
- Joseph Meyers, halfback
- James Stanton, tackle
- Charles Thomas, end
- James C. Walker, tackle/guard
