= 1894 Iowa Hawkeyes football team =

American college football season

1894 Iowa Hawkeyes football
- Conference: Western Interstate University Football Association
- Record: 4–4–1 (1–2 WIUFA)
- Head coach: Roger Sherman (1st season)
- Captain: Prince Sawyer
- Home stadium: Iowa Field

1894 Western Interstate University Football Association standings
	Conf.					Overall
Team	W		L		T	W		L		T
Missouri +	2	–	1	–	0	4	–	3	–	0
Nebraska +	2	–	1	–	0	6	–	2	–	0
Kansas	1	–	2	–	0	2	–	3	–	1
Iowa	1	–	2	–	0	4	–	4	–	1
+ – Conference co-champions

The 1894 Iowa Hawkeyes football team represented the State University of Iowa ("S.U.I."), now commonly known as the University of Iowa, as a member of the Western Interstate University Football Association (WIUFA) during the 1894 college football season. In their first and only season under head coach Roger Sherman, the Hawkeyes compiled a 4–4–1 record (1–2 in conference games), tied for last place in the WIUFA, and were outscored by a total of 158 to 146. The 1894 season included the first games in both the Iowa–Iowa State football rivalry and the Iowa–Wisconsin football rivalry. The Hawkeyes' 44–0 loss to Wisconsin remains the largest margin of victory in the 130-plus history of that rivalry.

Quarterback Prince Sawyer was the team captain. The team played its home games at Iowa Field in Iowa City, Iowa.

== Schedule ==
Date	Time	Opponent	Site	Result	Source
October 1		Iowa Agricultural*	Iowa Field; Iowa City, IA (rivalry)	L 8–16	
October 13		at Cornell (IA)*	Mount Vernon, IA	W 60–0	
October 20		at Augustana (IL)*	Rock Island, IL	W 34–0	
October 27		at Chicago*	Marshall Field; Chicago, IL	T 18–18	
October 29		at Wisconsin*	Randall Field; Madison, WI (rivalry)	L 0–44	
November 3	3:00 p.m.	Kansas	Iowa Field; Iowa City, IA	W 14–12	
November 10		Grinnell*	Iowa Field; Iowa City, IA	W 6–0	
November 19		at Missouri	Athletic Park; Columbia, MO	L 6–32	
November 29	3:00 p.m.	vs. Nebraska	Omaha YMCA Ball Park; Omaha, NE (rivalry)	L 0–36	
*Non-conference game

== Players ==
- Charles Aldrich
- Joseph Allen, guard
- Clymer Coldren, end
- Stevens Coldren, halfback
- William Collins, tackle
- Willard Converse, halfback
- Frank Gusolis
- Robert Hayes, end
- Carl Herrig, halfback
- John Hess
- Clarence Ingersoll, guard
- Iver Iverson, center
- Richard Kepler, fullback
- Kalita Leighton, guard
- Victor Littig, end
- Michael McKinley
- Prince Sawyer, quarterback and captain
- Hermon Williams, tackle
