= 1893 Iowa Hawkeyes football team =

American college football season

1893 Iowa Hawkeyes football
- Conference: Western Interstate University Football Association
- Record: 3–4 (1–2 WIUFA)
- Head coach: Ben "Sport" Donnelly (1st season)
- Home stadium: Iowa Field

1893 Western Interstate University Football Association standings
	Conf.					Overall
Team	W		L		T	W		L		T
Missouri +	2	–	1	–	0	4	–	3	–	0
Kansas +	2	–	1	–	0	2	–	5	–	0
Nebraska	1	–	2	–	0	3	–	2	–	1
Iowa	1	–	2	–	0	3	–	4	–	0
+ – Conference co-champions

The 1893 Iowa Hawkeyes football team represented the State University of Iowa ("S.U.I."), now commonly known as the University of Iowa, during the 1893 college football season. The season featured a new head coach in Ben "Sport" Donnelly. Like Edwin A. Dalton before him, Donnelly was only hired before the season to prepare and assemble the team. Donnelly was disliked compared to his predecessor but it did not stop Iowa from getting their first victory in the Western Interstate University Football Association (WIUFA) with a win over Missouri.

== Schedule ==
Date	Time	Opponent	Site	Result	Attendance	Source
October 7		Coe*	Iowa Field; Iowa City, IA	W 56–0		
October 14		at Denver Athletic Club*	Denver, CO	L 0–58		
October 21		Luther*	Iowa Field; Iowa City, IA	W 32–0		
November 4	3:00 p.m.	vs. Kansas	Exposition Park; Kansas City MO	L 24–35		
November 11		at Grinnell*	Grinnell, IA	L 14–36		
November 18		Missouri	Iowa Field; Iowa City, IA	W 34–12		
November 30	3:15 p.m.	vs. Nebraska	YMCA Park; Omaha, NE (rivalry)	L 18–20	1,000	
*Non-conference game
