= Charles Thomas (American football) =

American football player and coach, newspaper reporter and editor (1871–1920)

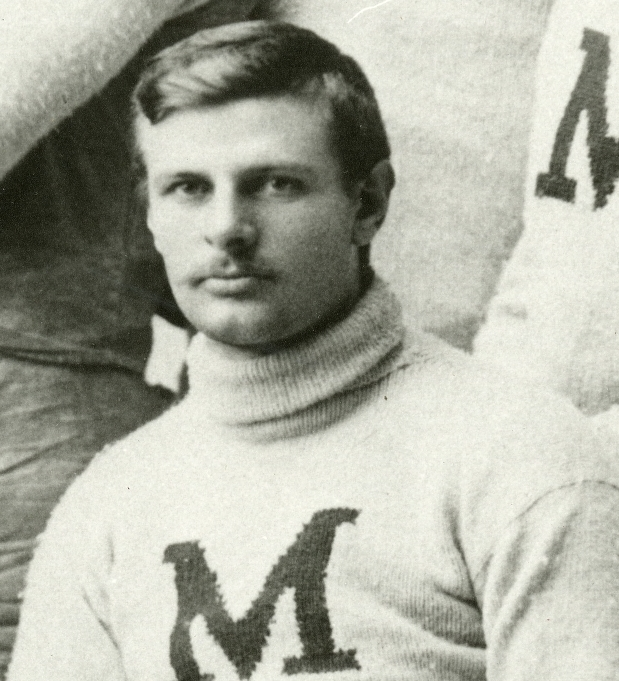

Biographical details
- Born: October 21, 1871; Omaha, Nebraska, U.S.
- Died: September 19, 1920 (aged 48); Omaha, Nebraska, U.S.

Playing career
- 1891–1892: Michigan
- Position: Guard

Coaching career (HC unless noted)
- 1892–1894: Nebraska (assistant)
- 1893: Baker
- 1895: Nebraska
- 1897: Nebraska Wesleyan
- 1901–1902: Arkansas

Head coaching record
- Overall: 26–13–1

Accomplishments and honors

Championships
- 1 WIUFA (1895)

Charles Ladd Thomas (October 21, 1871 – September 19, 1920) was an American college football player and coach and newspaper reporter and editor. A native of Omaha, Nebraska, Thomas enrolled at the University of Michigan, where he played at the guard position for the Michigan Wolverines football teams of 1891 and 1892. After graduating from Michigan in 1893, Thomas returned to Nebraska, where he served as an assistant football coach at the University of Nebraska under Frank Crawford in 1893 and 1894. In 1895, he took over as Nebraska's head football coach, posting a 6–3 record. In 1897, Thomas was the head football coach at Nebraska Wesleyan University. From 1901 to 1902, he served as the head football coach at Arkansas, where he compiled a 9–8 record.

== Nebraska ==
After Frank Crawford left Nebraska to go to the University of Texas in 1894, Thomas became the head coach for the 1895 season. He remained the coach for one year and had a 6–3 record while winning a share of the Western Interstate University Football Association title. Thomas took the Nebraska football team on its first long road trip with a game in Butte, Montana to play Butte's local athletic club.

== Late life and death ==
Thomas later worked as a reporter and editor for the Omaha Daily Bee in his hometown of Omaha, Nebraska. He died at his home in Omaha, on September 19, 1920, after suffering a paralytic stroke.

== Head coaching record ==
Year	Team	Overall	Conference	Standing	Bowl/playoffs
Baker Methodists (Independent) (1893)
1893	Baker	5–0–1			
Baker:		5–0–1			
Nebraska Bugeaters (Western Interstate University Football Association) (1895)
1895	Nebraska	6–3	2–1	T–1st	
Nebraska:		6–3	2–1		
Nebraska Wesleyan (Independent) (1897)
1897	Nebraska Wesleyan	5–2			
Nebraska Wesleyan:		5–2			
Arkansas Cardinals (Independent) (1901–1902)
1901	Arkansas	3–5			
1902	Arkansas	6–3			
Arkansas:		9–8			
Total:		25–13–1			
National championship Conference title Conference division title or championship game berth
