= Frank Kinney Holbrook =

American football player (c. 1874–1916)

Frank Kinney Holbrook (c. 1874 in Tipton, Iowa – October 29, 1916) was the first African American intercollegiate athlete at the University of Iowa and one of the first African Americans to participate on an American college varsity athletic squad. He played on the Iowa football team and lettered in both football and track in 1895 and 1896. He was Iowa's leading scorer in 1896 and led the Hawkeyes to their first football conference title in school history.

== Background ==
Frank Holbrook grew up in Tipton, Iowa. Frank Holbrook went to Tipton High School, graduated, and continued to Iowa. Frank Holbrook lettered in track and football for Iowa in 1895. How he came to be a part of the football team is not widely known. It is true, however, that in 1895, Iowa nearly did not field an official team. The school Athletic Board ruled that recognition would not be granted until the team paid off its debts, and that emergency fundraising was needed even to form the team that season.

However, to save money, the school did not hire a head coach. Practices were reportedly disorganized and sloppy, and the 1895 Hawkeyes posted a poor 2-5 record. Iowa football would never go without a professional head coach again. It was in this season of uncertainty that Frank Holbrook first participated in the Hawkeye football program as a freshman.

The Ivy League was the premier conference in college football at that time, so Iowa hired former Pennsylvania star A.E. Bull as their head coach for the 1896 season. Bull's arrival made Hawkeye fans optimistic that Iowa could bounce back from the disastrous 1895 campaign.

== The 1896 Season ==
Frank Holbrook returned for his second season in 1896 and was soon seen as Iowa's best ball carrier. Holbrook was a champion sprinter and Iowa’s best defensive man. He was described as "one of the best halfbacks in the west. He was generally given the ball when a good gain was needed on the last down. His line bucking was excellent. In falling on the ball after a fumble, he has his superior yet to meet. His ability lay in great part in his strength and sprinting qualities." He was also Iowa’s first black football player and, as a result, a target for opposing teams.

Iowa started the 1896 season with a 32-0 win over Drake, with Holbrook rushing for four touchdowns. Though Iowa would suffer a 6-0 loss at Chicago, the Chicago Times-Herald was complimentary, especially of Holbrook. "Iowa’s star work was done by Holbrook. It was brilliant. He made one run of forty yards through a forest of Chicago tackles, and a couple of sprints of thirty yards. Iowa always worked him when it was necessary to make a gain to keep the ball."

Four years earlier, Iowa had joined its first football conference. The conference, titled the Western Interstate University Football Association, had four members: Iowa, Nebraska, Kansas, and Missouri. The four schools played each other every year, with the winner of the round-robin series each year declared the conference champion. Iowa went 0-3 against their conference foes in 1895, being outscored by a combined score of 92-0.

In 1896, Iowa snapped a five-game conference losing streak by beating Kansas 6-0. With eight minutes remaining in a scoreless game, Iowa had the ball at the Kansas 45 yard line. Iowa lined up quickly and snapped the ball without a signal. The ball was pitched to Frank Holbrook who sprinted 45 yards for the lone touchdown. After the extra points (touchdowns were then worth four points, and the extra points try was worth two points), Iowa held a 6-0 lead, which they maintained for the win.

== The 1896 Missouri Game ==
After another easy non-conference win, Iowa carried their 4-1 record into Columbia, Missouri, for a game with the Tigers. Missouri had won a share of the conference title the past three years, from 1893 to 1895. Missouri alumni demanded that Iowa play the game without Frank Holbrook. Coach Bull refused and stated that there would be no game if Holbrook were not allowed to play. The Iowa City Vidette-Reporter (the University of Iowa's student newspaper) reported, "When Missouri’s team came on the field, they were heartily cheered with the Tigers’ yell, followed by appeals from the rooters to individual players to ‘kill the nigger’."

During the game, there were several physical confrontations. The Vidette-Reporter continued, "There was hardly a man on Iowa’s team who did not receive a cowardly blow from the Tigers. Several were hit while on the ground. One man received at least three blows from the fists of the Tigers. Not for ten seconds did one of Iowa’s men forget himself or lose his temper. At all times they placed themselves near and about Holbrook."

Iowa won the game, 12-0, on two touchdowns, one by halfback Joe Meyers and one by Frank Holbrook. Iowa refused to play Missouri again until 1902. Before a 1910 game with Missouri, Missouri officials warned Iowa coach Jesse Hawley not to bring black tackle Archie Alexander to the game. Hawley reluctantly agreed to Missouri's demands and Iowa lost 5-0. But Hawley later vowed that his teams would never face Missouri again, and the schools did not meet again on the football field until the 2010 Insight Bowl.

== The 1896 Conference Title ==
Two and a half weeks later, on Thanksgiving Day, the Hawkeyes carried a 6-1 record into a game against Nebraska to determine the Western Interstate conference champion. However, a mixture of rain, sleet, and snow prevented any scoring, and the game ended in a scoreless tie. Athletic officials from both schools, therefore, agreed to replay the conference title game two days later on Saturday.

In the rematch, Iowa won their first ever conference title by defeating Nebraska, 6-0. Iowa won the game on a thirty-yard touchdown run by Frank Holbrook. Iowa finished the year 7-1-1, and Holbrook finished his senior year with 12 touchdowns.

== Name confusion ==
The correct name of the first black football player at the University of Iowa is Frank 'Kinney' Holbrook, not Carleton William Holbrook. The apparent misinformation may have begun around 1939 when the University’s athletics department released a commemorative publication about Iowa football referring to "C.W. Holbrook". C.W. Holbrook was the only other student with that last name enrolled at the University of Iowa during the mid-1890s, according to general catalogs issued by the University at the time. However, C.W. Holbrook was a law student from Manchester, Iowa, and was not a member of the football team. Frank 'Kinney' Holbrook (called “Kinney” by his teammates, according to one edition of the Hawkeye yearbook) was a sophomore when he competed as a halfback in the fall of 1896. According to University alumni records, he did not graduate. C.W. Holbrook graduated in 1897 and his name is the only Holbrook that appears in alumni lists from that period. As a result, it is possible that C.W. Holbrook's name, and not that of Frank 'Kinney' Holbrook, was brought forward by mistake. Numerous publications subsequently repeated the error, including the McGrane and Bright titles cited below. Bright's work has no citations; McGrane quotes an undated Chicago Times-Herald article which uses only Holbrook's last name.

== Later life ==
He later moved to California and became a blacksmith. He died suddenly of a heart attack on October 29, 1916. His funeral was held at a “colored Masonic lodge” where Holbrook was a member. He was 39 years old.
