= Charles Young (American football) =

American football player and coach (1868–1909)

Biographical details
- Born: 1868; St. Joseph, Missouri, U.S.
- Died: March 21, 1908 (aged 40); St. Louis, Missouri, U.S.

Playing career
- 1893–1895: Missouri

Coaching career (HC unless noted)
- 1897: Missouri

Head coaching record
- Overall: 5–6

Charles Everett Young (1868 – March 21, 1909) was an American college football player and coach. He was the seventh head football coach at the University of Missouri, serving for one season, in 1897, and compiling a record of 5–6.

Born in St. Joseph, Missouri, Young was an alumnus of the University of Missouri, where he played college football from 1893 to 1895, captaining the team all three years. Young married Sally Burgess. He died at the age of 40, of typhoid fever, on March 21, 1909, at his home in St. Louis, Missouri and buried in Columbia, Missouri.

== Head coaching record ==
Year	Team	Overall	Conference	Standing	Bowl/playoffs
Missouri Tigers (Independent) (1897)
1897	Missouri	5–6			
Missouri:		5–6			
Total:		5–6			
