= Western Interstate University Football Association =

- Founded: 1892
- Folded: 1897
- Sports fielded: 1; men's: 1
- No. of teams: 4 (total)
- Region: Midwestern United States

The Western Interstate University Football Association (WIUFA) was one of the first intercollegiate athletic conferences in the United States, existing from 1892 to 1897.

== Formation, history and evolution ==
The football teams from the Universities of Iowa, Kansas, Missouri, and Nebraska formed the conference and competed against each other annually. Early WIUFA play led to the transition of the famous rivalry between Kansas and Missouri to the football field as many of the fans and some of the first players on both teams were the sons of men who had fought each other on either side of the conflict in Bleeding Kansas and later the Civil War. Racial tension surrounding the participation of Iowa's Frank Kinney Holbrook in the 1896 game between Iowa and Missouri ended up preventing what may have become a long-standing rivalry between the two schools.

All four members of the WIUFA would later be among the original members of the Missouri Valley Intercollegiate Athletic Association (MVIAA), which was formed in 1907. Kansas, Missouri and Nebraska stayed with the MVIAA as it evolved over the decades into the Big Eight Conference, which existed through the 1995 season, while Iowa remained a member of the Big Ten Conference and left after only one season of MVIAA competition. Beginning in 1996, the members of the Big Eight joined with four schools of the former Southwest Conference to form the new Big 12 Conference.

== Record-keeping discrepancies ==
For every year of the conference's existence, except 1896, there was at least one disagreement as to the final score of a game between member schools. However, in no cases is the final outcome of any game disputed.

== Seasons ==
1892 Western Interstate University Football Association standings
	Conf.					Overall
Team	W		L		T	W		L		T
Kansas $	3	–	0	–	0	7	–	1	–	0
Nebraska	1	–	1	–	1	2	–	2	–	1
Missouri	1	–	2	–	0	1	–	2	–	0
Iowa	0	–	2	–	1	3	–	2	–	1
$ – Conference champion

1895 Western Interstate University Football Association standings
	Conf.					Overall
Team	W		L		T	W		L		T
Missouri +	2	–	1	–	0	7	–	1	–	0
Kansas +	2	–	1	–	0	6	–	1	–	0
Nebraska +	2	–	1	–	0	6	–	3	–	0
Iowa	0	–	3	–	0	2	–	5	–	0
+ – Conference co-champions

1893 Western Interstate University Football Association standings
	Conf.					Overall
Team	W		L		T	W		L		T
Missouri +	2	–	1	–	0	4	–	3	–	0
Kansas +	2	–	1	–	0	2	–	5	–	0
Nebraska	1	–	2	–	0	3	–	2	–	1
Iowa	1	–	2	–	0	3	–	4	–	0
+ – Conference co-champions

1896 Western Interstate University Football Association standings
	Conf.					Overall
Team	W		L		T	W		L		T
Iowa $	2	–	0	–	1	7	–	1	–	1
Kansas	2	–	1	–	0	7	–	3	–	0
Nebraska	1	–	1	–	1	6	–	3	–	1
Missouri	0	–	3	–	0	7	–	5	–	0
$ – Conference champion

1894 Western Interstate University Football Association standings
	Conf.					Overall
Team	W		L		T	W		L		T
Missouri +	2	–	1	–	0	4	–	3	–	0
Nebraska +	2	–	1	–	0	6	–	2	–	0
Kansas	1	–	2	–	0	2	–	3	–	1
Iowa	1	–	2	–	0	4	–	4	–	1
+ – Conference co-champions

1897 Western Interstate University Football Association standings
	Conf.					Overall
Team	W		L		T	W		L		T
Nebraska $	3	–	0	–	0	5	–	1	–	0
Kansas	2	–	1	–	0	8	–	2	–	0
Iowa	0	–	2	–	0	4	–	4	–	0
Missouri	0	–	2	–	0	5	–	6	–	0
$ – Conference champion

== See also ==
- List of Western Interstate University Football Association standings
- List of defunct college football conferences
