= Kansas–Nebraska football rivalry =

American college football rivalry

- Kansas Jayhawks Nebraska Cornhuskers
- Sport: Football
- First meeting: November 12, 1892; Kansas, 12–0
- Latest meeting: November 13, 2010; Nebraska, 20–3

Statistics
- Total meetings: 117
- All-time series: Nebraska leads, 91–23–3
- Largest victory: Kansas, 76–39 (2007); Nebraska, 70–0 (1986)
- Longest win streak: Nebraska, 36 (1969–2004)
- Current win streak: Nebraska, 3 (2008–present)

Locations of Kansas and Nebraska

The Kansas–Nebraska football rivalry was an American college football rivalry between the Kansas Jayhawks and Nebraska Cornhuskers. The teams were conference opponents for over 100 years and played what was the longest uninterrupted annual series in college football history until it ended in 2010.

== History ==
In 1892, Kansas and Nebraska were founding members of the Western Interstate University Football Association, one of college football's first conferences. KU won the WIUFA championship, defeating NU 12–0 in Lincoln in the first meeting between the schools. The WIUFA dissolved in 1897, shortly after Nebraska defeated Kansas to clinch the title in a game that ended due to darkness after a lengthy argument over an NU touchdown.

The series was paused in 1904 and renewed in 1906, the first of what became 105 consecutive seasons in which KU and NU met. Though the series was evenly matched in its early years (each team won eight of the first sixteen games), Nebraska gained the upper hand when the Missouri Valley Intercollegiate Athletic Association (later the Big Eight Conference) was formed. From 1917 to 1943, Nebraska played twenty-seven consecutive games against KU without a loss.

A stretch of Jayhawks success after World War II was followed by a dominant Cornhuskers run – from 1968 through 2004, Nebraska was 36–0 in the series with an average margin of victory of over four touchdowns, the longest win streak over a conference opponent in major college football history. KU's streak-ending 2005 win was described as "euphoric," as was its famous 76–39 victory in 2007, the most points ever allowed by Nebraska.

In 2010, Kansas and Nebraska were among six Big 12 schools that sought entry to the Big Ten, though only Nebraska joined. At the time it ended, the rivalry was the longest uninterrupted series in college football history. No future games are scheduled.

== Game results ==
Kansas victories	Nebraska victories	Tie games

No.	Date	Location	Winner	Score
1	November 12, 1892	Lincoln	Kansas	12–0
2	November 18, 1893	Lincoln	Kansas	18–0
3	November 17, 1894	Lawrence	Nebraska	12–6
4	November 16, 1895	Lincoln	Kansas	8–4
5	November 7, 1896	Lawrence	Kansas	18–4
6	November 13, 1897	Lincoln	Nebraska	10–5
7	November 5, 1898	Lawrence	Nebraska	18–5
8	November 18, 1899	Lincoln	Kansas	36–20
9	November 17, 1900	Lawrence	Nebraska	12–0
10	November 16, 1901	Lincoln	Nebraska	29–5
11	November 8, 1902	Lincoln	Nebraska	16–0
12	November 14, 1903	Lawrence	Nebraska	6–0
13	November 17, 1906	Lincoln	Kansas	8–6
14	November 9, 1907	Lawrence	Nebraska	16–6
15	November 14, 1908	Lincoln	Kansas	20–5
16	November 6, 1909	Lincoln	Kansas	6–0
17	November 5, 1910	Lawrence	Nebraska	6–5
18	November 18, 1911	Lawrence	Nebraska	29–0
19	November 16, 1912	Lincoln	Nebraska	14–3
20	November 15, 1913	Lawrence	Nebraska	9–0
21	November 14, 1914	Lincoln	Nebraska	35–0
22	November 13, 1915	Lawrence	Nebraska	33–0
23	November 18, 1916	Lincoln	Kansas	7–3
24	November 17, 1917	Lawrence	Nebraska	13–3
25	November 16, 1918	Lincoln	Nebraska	20–0
26	November 15, 1919	Lincoln	Nebraska	19–7
27	November 13, 1920	Lawrence	Tie	20–20
28	November 12, 1921	Lincoln	Nebraska	28–0
29	November 11, 1922	Lawrence	Nebraska	28–0
30	October 20, 1923	Lincoln	Tie	0–0
31	October 25, 1924	Lawrence	Nebraska	14–7
32	October 24, 1925	Lincoln	Nebraska	14–0
33	October 23, 1926	Lawrence	Nebraska	20–3
34	November 5, 1927	Lincoln	Nebraska	47–13
35	November 3, 1928	Lawrence	Nebraska	20–0
36	November 2, 1929	Lincoln	Nebraska	12–6
37	November 8, 1930	Lawrence	Nebraska	16–0
38	October 24, 1931	Lincoln	Nebraska	6–0
39	October 22, 1932	Lawrence	Nebraska	20–6
40	November 11, 1933	Lincoln	Nebraska	12–0
41	November 17, 1934	Lawrence	Nebraska	3–0
42	November 9, 1935	Lincoln	Nebraska	19–13
43	November 7, 1936	Lawrence	#8 Nebraska	26–0
44	November 6, 1937	Lincoln	Tie	13–13
45	November 5, 1938	Lawrence	Nebraska	16–7
46	November 11, 1939	Lincoln	Nebraska	7–0
47	October 19, 1940	Lawrence	Nebraska	53–2
48	October 11, 1941	Lincoln	Nebraska	32–0
49	October 31, 1942	Lawrence	Nebraska	14–7
50	October 23, 1943	Lincoln	Nebraska	7–6
51	October 21, 1944	Lawrence	Kansas	20–0
52	November 3, 1945	Lincoln	Nebraska	27–13
53	October 19, 1946	Lawrence	Nebraska	16–14
54	November 8, 1947	Lincoln	Kansas	13–7
55	October 23, 1948	Lawrence	Kansas	27–7
56	November 5, 1949	Lincoln	Kansas	27–13
57	October 28, 1950	Lawrence	Nebraska	33–26
58	November 3, 1951	Lincoln	Kansas	27–7
59	November 8, 1952	Lawrence	Nebraska	14–13

No.	Date	Location	Winner	Score
60	October 31, 1953	Lincoln	Nebraska	9–0
61	November 6, 1954	Lawrence	#20 Nebraska	41–20
62	October 29, 1955	Lincoln	Nebraska	19–14
63	November 10, 1956	Lawrence	Nebraska	26–20
64	November 2, 1957	Lincoln	Kansas	14–12
65	November 8, 1958	Lawrence	Kansas	29–7
66	October 10, 1959	Lincoln	Kansas	10–3
67	November 5, 1960	Lawrence	Kansas	31–0
68	November 4, 1961	Lincoln	Kansas	28–6
69	November 10, 1962	Lawrence	Nebraska	40–16
70	November 9, 1963	Lincoln	Nebraska	23–9
71	November 7, 1964	Lawrence	#5 Nebraska	14–7
72	November 6, 1965	Lincoln	#3 Nebraska	42–6
73	November 5, 1966	Lawrence	#6 Nebraska	24–13
74	October 14, 1967	Lawrence	Kansas	10–0
75	October 12, 1968	Lincoln	#6 Kansas	23–13
76	October 18, 1969	Lincoln	Nebraska	21–17
77	October 17, 1970	Lawrence	#5 Nebraska	41–20
78	October 16, 1971	Lincoln	#1 Nebraska	55–0
79	October 21, 1972	Lawrence	#5 Nebraska	56–0
80	October 20, 1973	Lincoln	#11 Nebraska	10–9
81	October 19, 1974	Lawrence	#12 Nebraska	56–0
82	October 11, 1975	Lincoln	#4 Nebraska	16–0
83	October 30, 1976	Lawrence	#9 Nebraska	31–3
84	November 12, 1977	Lincoln	#12 Nebraska	52–7
85	November 4, 1978	Lawrence	#4 Nebraska	63–21
86	October 13, 1979	Lincoln	#5 Nebraska	42–0
87	October 11, 1980	Lawrence	#10 Nebraska	54–0
88	October 31, 1981	Lincoln	#12 Nebraska	31–15
89	October 30, 1982	Lawrence	#6 Nebraska	52–0
90	November 12, 1983	Lincoln	#1 Nebraska	67–13
91	November 10, 1984	Lawrence	#2 Nebraska	41–7
92	November 16, 1985	Lincoln	#2 Nebraska	56–6
93	November 15, 1986	Lawrence	#6 Nebraska	70–0
94	October 10, 1987	Lincoln	#2 Nebraska	54–2
95	October 8, 1988	Lawrence	#9 Nebraska	63–10
96	November 11, 1989	Lincoln	#6 Nebraska	51–14
97	November 10, 1990	Lawrence	#13 Nebraska	41–9
98	November 9, 1991	Lawrence	#11 Nebraska	59–23
99	November 7, 1992	Lincoln	#7 Nebraska	49–7
100	November 6, 1993	Lawrence	#6 Nebraska	21–20
101	November 5, 1994	Lincoln	#1 Nebraska	45–17
102	November 11, 1995	Lawrence	#1 Nebraska	41–3
103	October 26, 1996	Lincoln	#5 Nebraska	63–7
104	October 25, 1997	Lawrence	#1 Nebraska	35–0
105	October 17, 1998	Lincoln	#8 Nebraska	41–0
106	October 30, 1999	Lawrence	#8 Nebraska	24–17
107	November 4, 2000	Lincoln	#5 Nebraska	56–17
108	November 3, 2001	Lawrence	#2 Nebraska	51–7
109	November 9, 2002	Lincoln	Nebraska	45–7
110	November 8, 2003	Lawrence	#19 Nebraska	24–3
111	October 2, 2004	Lincoln	Nebraska	14–8
112	November 5, 2005	Lawrence	Kansas	40–15
113	September 30, 2006	Lincoln	#21 Nebraska	39–32
114	November 3, 2007	Lawrence	#8 Kansas	76–39
115	November 8, 2008	Lincoln	Nebraska	45–35
116	November 14, 2009	Lawrence	Nebraska	31–17
117	November 13, 2010	Lincoln	#9 Nebraska	20–3
Series: Nebraska leads 91–23–3

== See also ==
- List of NCAA college football rivalry games
- List of most-played college football series in NCAA Division I
