= Missouri–Nebraska football rivalry =

American college football rivalry

- Missouri Tigers Nebraska Cornhuskers
- Sport: Football
- First meeting: November 5, 1892; Nebraska, 1–0 (forfeit)
- Latest meeting: October 30, 2010
- Trophy: Victory Bell

Statistics
- Total meetings: 104
- All-time series: Nebraska leads, 65–36–3
- Largest victory: Nebraska, 62–0 (1972)
- Current win streak: Nebraska, 2

Locations of Missouri and Nebraska

The Missouri–Nebraska football rivalry was an American college football rivalry between the Missouri Tigers and Nebraska Cornhuskers. For over 100 years, the teams met annually as members of the WIUFA, Big Eight, and Big 12. The Missouri–Nebraska Bell (often referred to as the Victory Bell) was presented to the winner from 1927 until NU joined the Big Ten in 2010, ending its series with MU.

== History ==
Missouri and Nebraska were founding members of the Western Interstate University Football Association in 1892 and first met on November 5 of the same year, a 1–0 forfeit win for Nebraska in Omaha after the Tigers refused to play against African-American George Flippin. Flippin later joked "I was so good I beat the University of Missouri all by myself." MU agreed to face Flippin and NU in 1893 and 1894, winning both games.

The teams joined the Missouri Valley Intercollegiate Athletic Association (later the Big Eight Conference) in 1907 but did not begin playing annually until 1922, the first of eighty-eight consecutive seasons the Tigers and Cornhuskers met. Nebraska controlled the series until the late 1930s, when Missouri began a stretch of nineteen victories in twenty-five games that lasted until NU hired Bob Devaney in 1962.

Devaney turned Nebraska into a national powerhouse throughout the 1960s, but the Cornhuskers did not immediately gain control of the series against the Tigers. Missouri's 16–7 1962 victory in Lincoln was the first game of Nebraska's NCAA-record sellout streak. NU won the next four games against MU, but the Tigers responded with three consecutive victories and shared the Big Eight title with Nebraska in 1969, the program's most recent conference championship.

Missouri defeated Devaney's successor Tom Osborne in four of his first six seasons, including Osborne's first loss as a head coach in 1973, with Nebraska ranked in the national top five in each matchup. In the last of these, a 1978 upset of No. 2 Nebraska behind four James Wilder touchdowns, Missouri was led by Warren Powers, a former Devaney and Osborne assistant who served as MU's head coach for seven seasons.

Missouri's 1978 upset was its last victory over Osborne, who coached until 1997. Nebraska's twenty-four-game win streak in the series, which continued for six years after Osborne's retirement, came with an average margin of victory of 24.6 points.

=== Big 12 era ===
In 1996, Missouri and Nebraska were placed in the Big 12 North Division when the Big Eight merged with four Texas schools of the Southwest. In the second Big 12 game between MU and NU, top-ranked Nebraska survived an upset bid after a bizarre, game-tying touchdown as time expired that became known as the "Flea Kicker." Nebraska won in overtime, later claiming its third national championship in four years.

Missouri upset No. 10 Nebraska in 2003 to end the streak at twenty-four, with observers suggesting the rivalry had returned to a level of intensity felt prior to the late 1980s. After another victory over NU in 2005, Missouri students paraded Faurot Field's goalposts around Columbia, a campus tradition dating to 1971. Twenty fans were arrested on trespassing charges and the university installed collapsible goalposts in 2006, hoping to avoid future incidents.

The teams met on October 30, 2010, a 31–17 Nebraska victory over sixth-ranked Missouri, in their last meeting as conference opponents. Nebraska joined the Big Ten Conference the 2011 season, placing the Cornhuskers and Tigers in separate conferences for the first time since 1920. Missouri sought entry to the Big Ten as well, but was denied and instead joined the Southeastern Conference in 2012. No future meetings are scheduled.

== Victory Bell ==
In 1892, a bell was stolen from a Seward, Nebraska church by members of the University of Nebraska's Delta Tau Delta and Phi Delta Theta. It served as a prize for the winner of athletic and scholastic competitions between the fraternities, but led to a dispute over which owned the bell. In 1926, Missouri athletic director Chester D. Brewer suggested a trophy be established for the annual football game against Nebraska; NU administration accepted and repurposed the bell, which was named the Missouri–Nebraska Bell with 'M' and 'N' engraved on opposite sides. More commonly referred to as the Victory Bell, it was exchanged between the Innocents Society at Nebraska and the QEBH society at Missouri.

The Victory Bell has been housed at Nebraska's Wick Alumni Center since the series ended in 2010, with a commemorative bell at the University of Missouri.

== Game results ==
Missouri victories	Nebraska victories	Tie games

No.	Date	Location	Winner	Score
1	November 5, 1892	Omaha	Nebraska	1–0†
2	November 11, 1893	Kansas City	Missouri	30–18
3	November 3, 1894	Kansas City	Missouri	18–14
4	November 2, 1895	Omaha	Nebraska	12–10
5	October 26, 1896	Columbia	Nebraska	8–4
6	October 30, 1897	Lincoln	Nebraska	41–0
7	October 24, 1898	Columbia	Nebraska	47–6
8	October 21, 1899	Lincoln	Missouri	11–0
9	November 5, 1900	Columbia	Nebraska	12–0
10	November 9, 1901	Omaha	Nebraska	51–0
11	October 25, 1902	St. Joseph	Nebraska	12–0
12	October 28, 1911	Lincoln	Nebraska	34–0
13	November 2, 1912	Columbia	Nebraska	7–0
14	November 10, 1917	Lincoln	Nebraska	52–0
15	November 8, 1919	Columbia	Nebraska	12–5
16	October 21, 1922	Lincoln	Nebraska	48–0
17	October 27, 1923	Columbia	Tie	7–7
18	November 1, 1924	Lincoln	Nebraska	14–6
19	October 10, 1925	Columbia	Missouri	9–6
20	October 9, 1926	Lincoln	Missouri	14–7
21	October 8, 1927	Columbia	Missouri	7–6
22	October 27, 1928	Lincoln	Nebraska	24–0
23	October 26, 1929	Columbia	Tie	7–7
24	November 15, 1930	Lincoln	Tie	0–0
25	October 31, 1931	Columbia	Nebraska	10–7
26	November 24, 1932	Lincoln	Nebraska	21–6
27	November 4, 1933	Columbia	Nebraska	26–0
28	November 24, 1934	Lincoln	Nebraska	13–6
29	November 2, 1935	Columbia	Nebraska	19–6
30	October 31, 1936	Lincoln	#11 Nebraska	20–0
31	October 23, 1937	Columbia	#8 Nebraska	7–0
32	October 29, 1938	Lincoln	Missouri	13–10
33	November 4, 1939	Columbia	Missouri	27–13
34	October 26, 1940	Lincoln	#18 Nebraska	20–7
35	October 25, 1941	Columbia	Missouri	6–0
36	November 7, 1942	Lincoln	Missouri	26–6
37	October 30, 1943	Columbia	Missouri	54–20
38	October 28, 1944	Lincoln	Nebraska	24–20
39	October 27, 1945	Columbia	Missouri	19–0
40	November 2, 1946	Lincoln	Missouri	21–20
41	November 1, 1947	Columbia	Missouri	47–6
42	November 20, 1948	Lincoln	Missouri	33–6
43	October 29, 1949	Columbia	#16 Missouri	21–20
44	November 4, 1950	Lincoln	Nebraska	40–34
45	October 27, 1951	Columbia	Missouri	35–19
46	November 1, 1952	Lincoln	Missouri	10–6
47	October 24, 1953	Columbia	Missouri	23–7
48	October 30, 1954	Lincoln	Nebraska	25–19
49	October 22, 1955	Columbia	Nebraska	18–12
50	November 3, 1956	Lincoln	Nebraska	15–14
51	October 26, 1957	Columbia	Missouri	14–13
52	November 1, 1958	Lincoln	Missouri	31–0
53	October 24, 1959	Columbia	Missouri	9–0

No.	Date	Location	Winner	Score
54	October 29, 1960	Lincoln	#5 Missouri	28–0
55	October 28, 1961	Columbia	Missouri	10–0
56	November 3, 1962	Lincoln	Missouri	16–7
57	November 2, 1963	Columbia	Nebraska	13–12
58	October 31, 1964	Lincoln	#5 Nebraska	9–0
59	October 30, 1965	Columbia	#3 Nebraska	16–14
60	October 29, 1966	Lincoln	#8 Nebraska	35–0
61	November 18, 1967	Columbia	Missouri	10–7
62	October 19, 1968	Lincoln	#20 Missouri	16–14
63	October 11, 1969	Columbia	#7 Missouri	17–7
64	October 10, 1970	Lincoln	#6 Nebraska	21–7
65	October 9, 1971	Columbia	#1 Nebraska	36–0
66	October 14, 1972	Lincoln	#6 Nebraska	62–0
67	October 13, 1973	Columbia	#12 Missouri	13–12
68	October 12, 1974	Lincoln	Missouri	21–10
69	November 1, 1975	Columbia	#3 Nebraska	30–7
70	October 23, 1976	Lincoln	#17 Missouri	34–24
71	November 5, 1977	Columbia	#11 Nebraska	21–10
72	November 18, 1978	Lincoln	Missouri	35–31
73	November 3, 1979	Columbia	#2 Nebraska	23–20
74	November 1, 1980	Lincoln	#8 Nebraska	38–16
75	October 24, 1981	Columbia	#15 Nebraska	6–0
76	October 23, 1982	Lincoln	#5 Nebraska	23–19
77	October 15, 1983	Columbia	#1 Nebraska	34–13
78	October 13, 1984	Lincoln	#6 Nebraska	33–23
79	October 19, 1985	Columbia	#7 Nebraska	28–20
80	October 18, 1986	Lincoln	#3 Nebraska	48–17
81	October 31, 1987	Columbia	#2 Nebraska	42–7
82	October 29, 1988	Lincoln	#5 Nebraska	26–18
83	October 14, 1989	Columbia	#4 Nebraska	50–7
84	October 13, 1990	Lincoln	#7 Nebraska	69–21
85	October 26, 1991	Lincoln	#9 Nebraska	63–6
86	October 24, 1992	Columbia	#8 Nebraska	34–24
87	October 23, 1993	Lincoln	#5 Nebraska	49–7
88	October 22, 1994	Columbia	#3 Nebraska	42–7
89	October 14, 1995	Lincoln	#2 Nebraska	57–0
90	November 9, 1996	Lincoln	#5 Nebraska	51–7
91	November 8, 1997	Columbia	#1 Nebraska	45–38^{OT}
92	October 24, 1998	Lincoln	#7 Nebraska	20–13
93	September 25, 1999	Columbia	#6 Nebraska	40–10
94	September 30, 2000	Lincoln	#1 Nebraska	42–24
95	September 29, 2001	Columbia	#4 Nebraska	36–3
96	October 12, 2002	Lincoln	Nebraska	24–13
97	October 11, 2003	Columbia	Missouri	41–24
98	October 30, 2004	Lincoln	Nebraska	24–3
99	October 22, 2005	Columbia	Missouri	41–24
100	November 4, 2006	Lincoln	Nebraska	34–20
101	October 6, 2007	Columbia	#17 Missouri	41–6
102	October 4, 2008	Lincoln	#4 Missouri	52–17
103	October 8, 2009	Columbia	#21 Nebraska	27–12
104	October 30, 2010	Lincoln	#14 Nebraska	31–17
Series: Nebraska leads 65–36–3
† Missouri forfeit

== See also ==
- List of NCAA college football rivalry games
- List of most-played college football series in NCAA Division I
