= History of Michigan Wolverines football in the early years =

Michigan Wolverines football
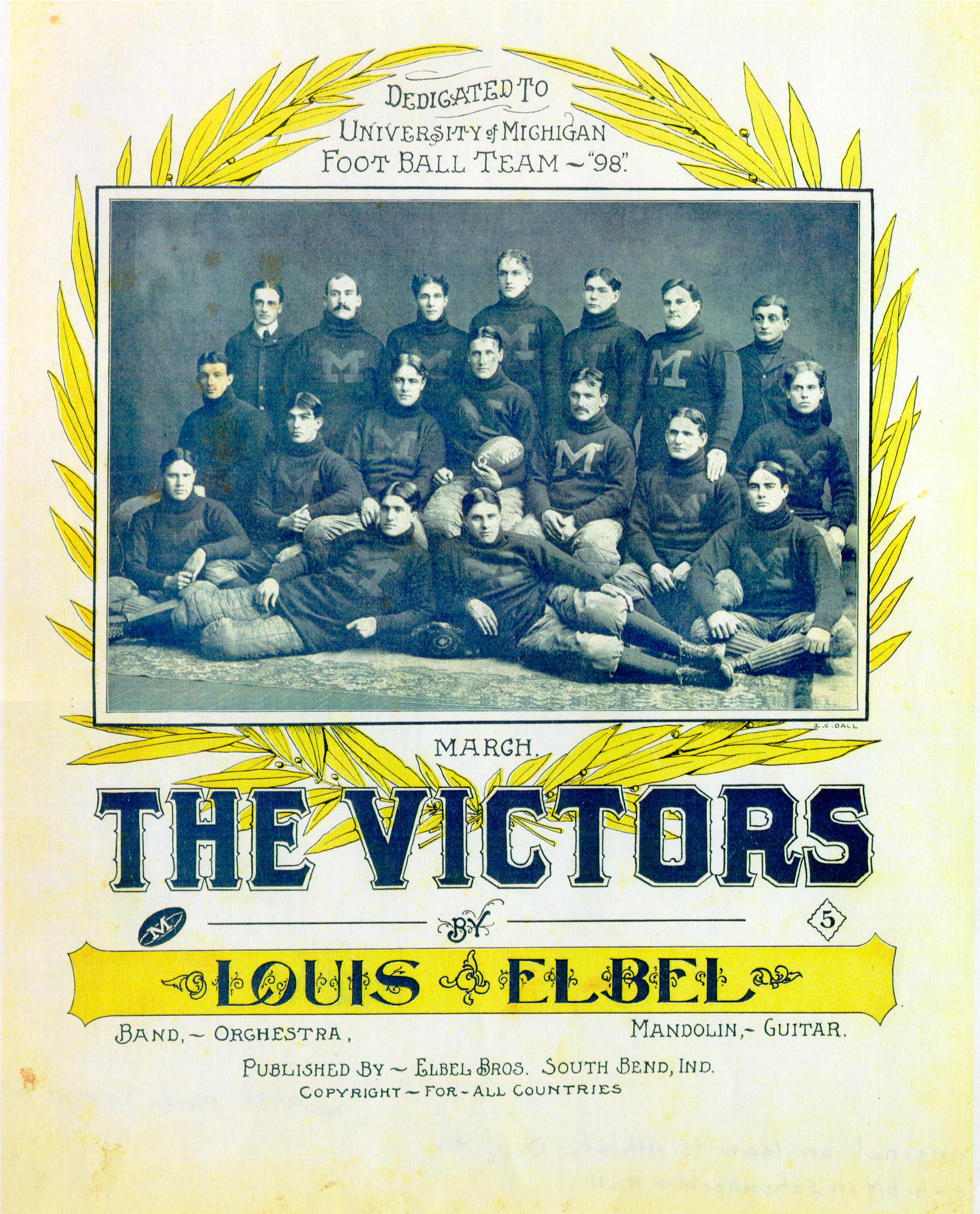
- Athletic director: Charles A. Baird (1898–1909)
- Head coach: 32 season, 98–31–4 (.752)
- Location: Ann Arbor, Michigan
- Conference: Independent (1879–1895); Western Conference (1896–present)
- Colors: Maize and blue

Conference championships
- 1

The History of Michigan Wolverines football in the early years covers the history of the University of Michigan Wolverines football program from its formation in the 1870s through the hiring of Fielding H. Yost prior to the 1901 season. Michigan was independent of any conference until 1896 when it became one of the founding members of the Western Conference (now known as the Big Ten Conference). The team played its home games at the Washtenaw County Fairgrounds from 1883 to 1892 and then at Regents Field starting in 1893.

While the first official university football team was not formed until 1879, class football teams were formed as early as 1870. The university team played its first game against Racine College in May 1879, and Irving Kane Pond scored the first touchdown in Michigan football history. In 1881, the Michigan football team traveled to the East and played a series of games that marked the beginning of football as an inter-sectional game. In the mid-1880s, the Wolverines had four consecutive undefeated seasons and allowed opponents to score only two points between November 1884 and April 1888. In November 1887, the Michigan football team traveled to South Bend, Indiana, where it taught Notre Dame students the game of football and participated in the first Notre Dame football game.

The Michigan football team was among the first to be racially integrated. George Jewett became Michigan's first African-American player in 1890 and was one of the leading stars in the early years of Michigan football. The 1891 season was the first in which the Michigan football team had a coach with Frank Crawford and Mike Murphy coaching the team. William McCauley served as head coach in 1894 and 1895 and compiled a 17–2–1 record, including the Wolverines' first victory over one of the Eastern football powers. The 1895 team outscored opponents 266 to 14 and was acknowledged as the Western football champions.

In 1896, Michigan participated in the first indoor football game, a game played under electric lights at the Chicago Coliseum. The 1898 Michigan team compiled a perfect 10–0 record, outscored its opponents 205 to 26, and won the school's first Western Conference championship. William Cunningham became Michigan's first consensus All-American, and the victory of the 1898 team over Amos Alonzo Stagg's Chicago Maroons inspired Louis Elbel to write Michigan's fight song, "The Victors." Gustave Ferbert served as Michigan's head coach from 1897 to 1899, compiling a record of 24–3–1, including a 16-game winning streak from 1898 to 1899. In May 1900, Ferbert left the program to prospect for gold in Alaska. His replacement, Langdon Lea, lasted only one year as Michigan's head coach.

== Year-by-year results ==
Season	Head coach	Captain	Conf. rank	Record	PF	PA
1879	No coach	David DeTarr	na	1–0–1	1	0
1880	No coach	John Chase	na	1–0	13	6
1881	No coach	W. S. Horton	na	0–3	4	28
1882	No coach	W. J. Olcott	na	0–0	0	0
1883	No coach	W. J. Olcott	na	2–3	63	73
1884	No coach	H. Prettyman	na	2–0	36	10
1885	No coach	H. Prettyman	na	3–0	82	2
1886	No coach	H. Prettyman	na	2–0	74	0
1887	No coach	John Duffy	na	5–0	66	0
1888	No coach	James Duffy	na	2–1	130	46
1889	No coach	E. McPherran	na	1–2	33	80
1890	No coach	Wm. Malley	na	4–1	129	36
1891	Murphy & Crawford	J. Van Inwagen	na	4–5	168	114
1892	Frank Barbour	George Dygert	na	7–5	298	170
1893	Frank Barbour	George Dygert	na	7–3	278	102
1894	William McCauley	James Baird	na	9–1–1	244	84
1895	William McCauley	F. Henninger	na	8–1	266	14
1896	William Ward	Henry Senter	2nd	9–1	262	11
1897	Gustave Ferbert	James R. Hogg	3rd	6–1–1	168	31
1898	Gustave Ferbert	John Bennett	1st	10–0	205	36
1899	Gustave Ferbert	Allen Steckle	4th	8–2	176	43
1900	Langdon Lea	Neil Snow	4th	7–2–1	117	55

== History of the program ==
=== Early developments ===
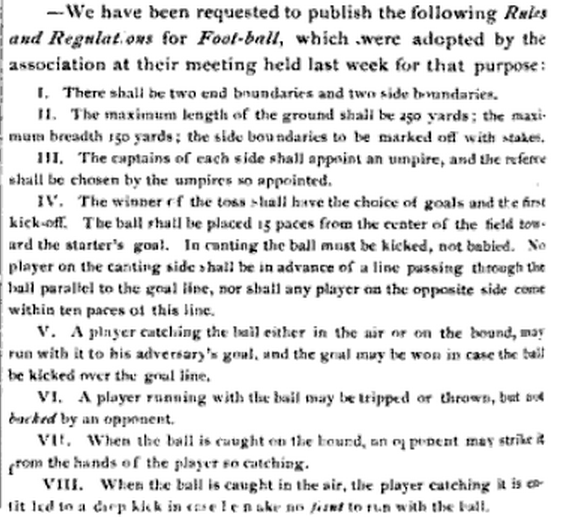

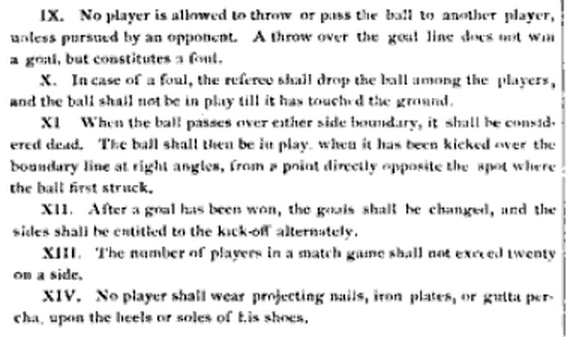
Rules and Regulations adopted by the Foot-ball Association in 1873.

The November 1869 game between Rutgers University and Princeton University is often cited as the first game of intercollegiate football. By the spring of 1870, the game had spread to Ann Arbor. In April 1870, members of the freshman class announced that they had formed a football club. And in May 1870, the football club formed by the freshmen defeated the football team from the Union School by a score of 7 to 5. Beginning in the early 1870s, football teams formed by the individual classes also played games against each other.

In May 1873, a newly formed Foot Ball Association approved the first set of official rules to govern the game at Michigan. Michigan's 1873 Rules and Regulations for Foot-ball (shown at right) provided for no more than 20 players per side, allowed a player running with the ball "may be tripped or thrown, but not backed", and prohibited players from wearing "projecting nails, iron plates, or gutta percha, upon the heels or soles of his shoes."

In the fall of 1873, The Chronicle (a student newspaper of the time) announced that the Cornell football team had accepted a challenge to play a "match game of foot-ball" in Cleveland, but the Cornell faculty had refused to grant the players leave to attend the game. The Chronicle protested the "apron-string, boarding school tyranny" of the Cornell faculty. In October 1874, members of Michigan's University Foot Ball Organization continued their efforts to schedule a game with Cornell, but The Chronicle expressed doubt that it would ever happen.

By November 1877, interest in football appears to have waned at Michigan. The Chronicle at that time eschewed the emphasis placed on the game in Eastern colleges: "It is noticeable that a greater part of the department for the Fall numbers is given to silly foot-ball matches and other boyish nonsense which makes Eastern colleges a laughing stock in the eyes of sober-minded people. It is all well-enough to have a foot-ball game once in a while for a little exercise, but for a number of colleges to take more interest in such things than they do in their studies, is a peculiar product of the Eastern superiority."

=== Formation of a team in 1879 ===
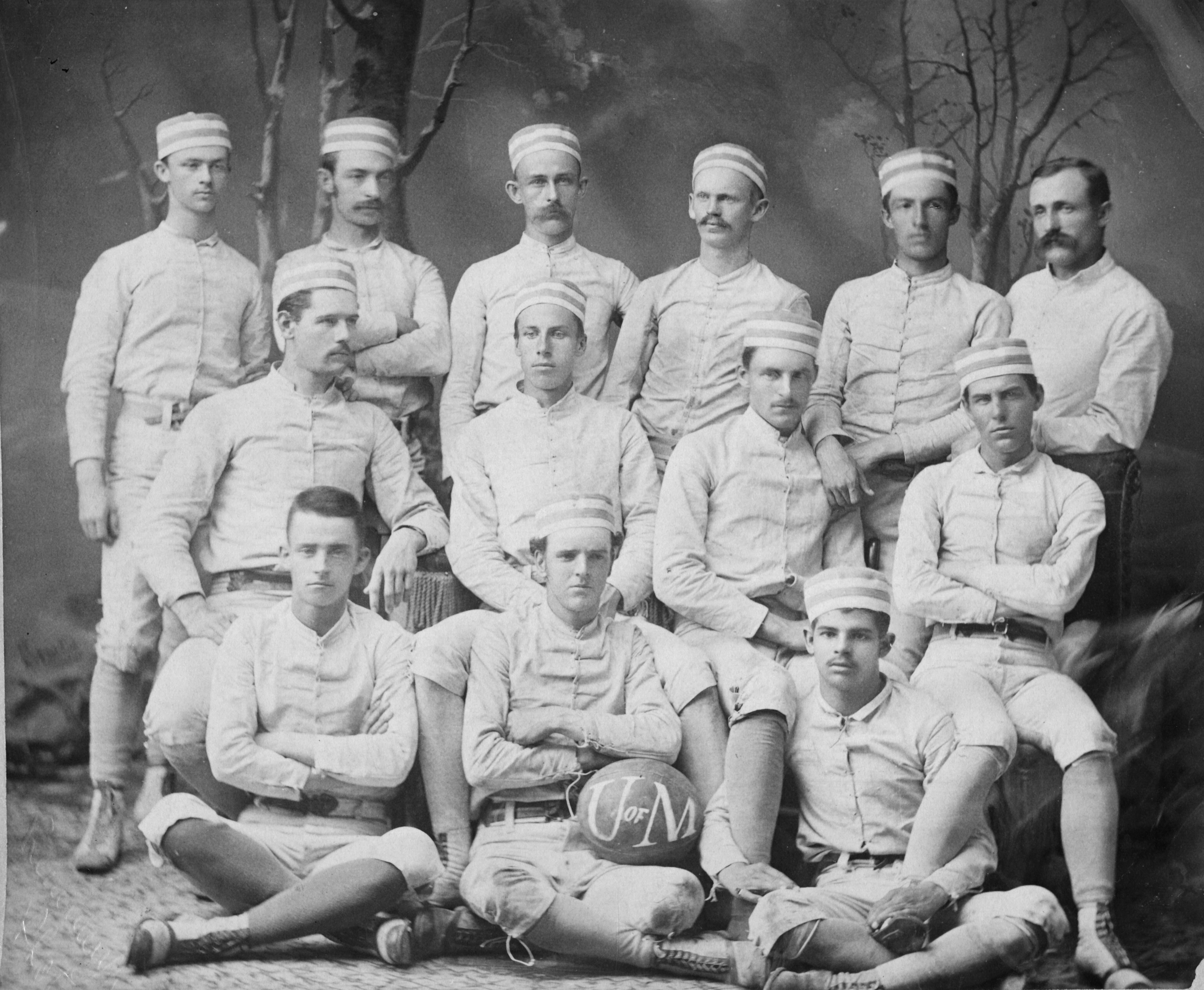
The 1879-79 Michigan football team that defeated Racine on May 30, 1879.

In October 1878, The Chronicle published a letter from the Racine College football team proposing a game at a neutral site in Chicago. Racine offered to procure the grounds, tend to the advertising, and pay Michigan two-thirds of the gate money. In late October, the Michigan Foot-ball Association voted to accept the challenge on condition that the game be played in the spring. The Association explained: "Inasmuch as the University possesses no eleven, and as the lateness of the season prohibits the training of one, a game this fall is out of the question." On October 26, The Chronicle emphasized: "[O]ne very important point must not be overlooked. It is essential that we win the first game. ... Defeat would put an end to all our fond expectations, while success alone can make them possible."

On April 5, 1879, The Chronicle expressed concern over the lack of work in preparing the team for its game against Racine: "The time for the long-expected and much-talked of foot-ball match with Racine is rapidly approaching and as yet little or no work has been done by our teams to prepare for it. We learn from the Racine paper that ... the men have been at work in the gymnasium all winter. Of course, we, not having the advantage which a gymnasium affords, could not work in the winter, but now that the snow has gone, it is high time that our teams were hard at work every day. But they are not. Indeed they seem to be distinguished only by their laziness and lack of enthusiasm." On May 3, 1879, The Chronicle wrote that the Athletic Association had appointed committees to select the players for the university football team, to select uniforms for the team, and "to obtain subscriptions to meet the expense of sending the team to Chicago."

On May 17, 1879, The Chronicle devoted its front page to coverage of the upcoming football game in Chicago. The paper reported that a team of 22 players had been selected and had decided to practice "after supper, when the campus would be free, and it would not interfere with study." The paper continued to express concerns about the lack of rigor in the team's practice: "[T]hey have not all been on the ground at the same time since they were selected, the least sprinkle of rain, a little stiffness of the joints, a slight lack of energy, anything in short that could be twisted into an excuse seemed to be enough to keep them off the grounds. Now this will not do if the boys expect to win, if they expect even to make a respectable showing they must practice every possible moment, must put off everything else, study, amusement, girls, everything, and be promptly on hand for the nightly game. ... [T]hey must work hard and faithfully else they will disgrace our University and make it anything but an honor to have been a member of the team of 1878–9."

On the Wednesday evening before the Racine game, the team appeared on campus in their new uniforms: "They presented quite a neat appearance. The uniform is of white canvas, close fitting, with blue stockings and belt."

=== The first game in May 1879 ===
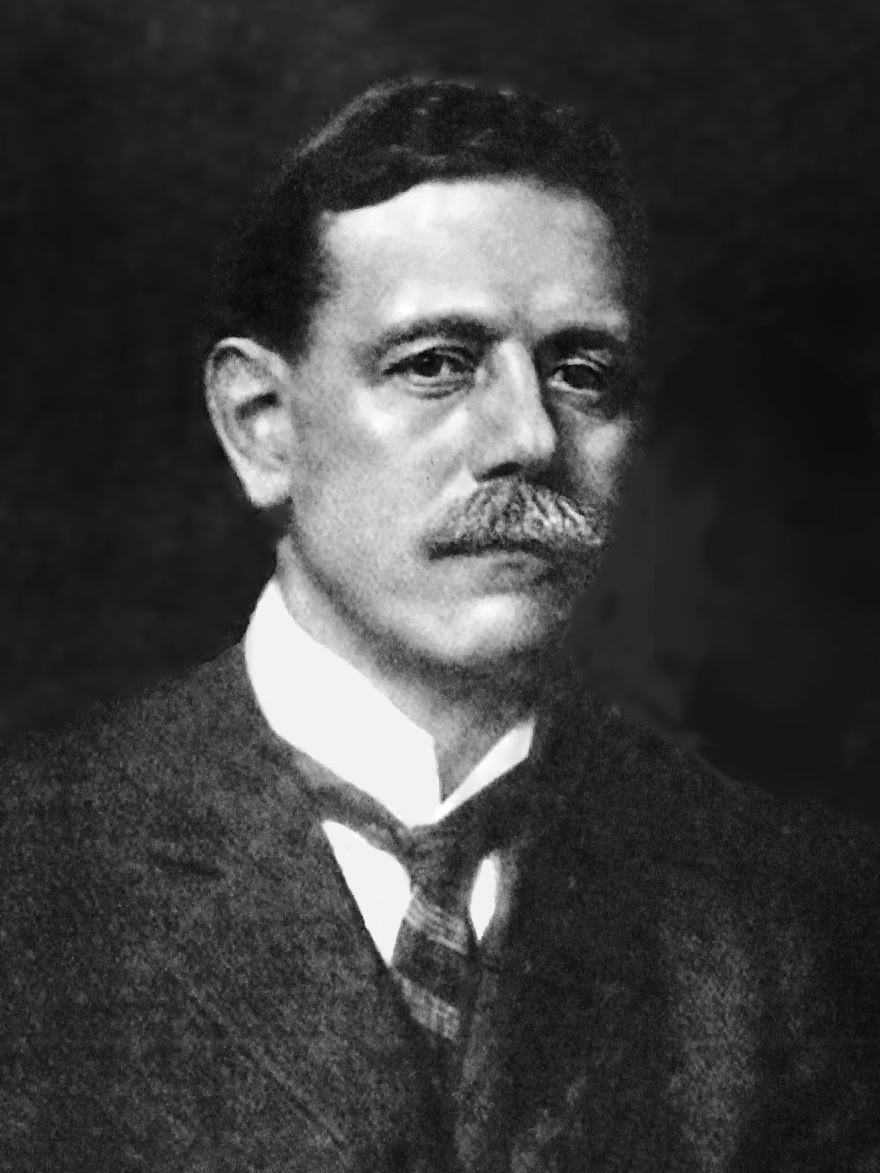
Irving Kane Pond scored the first touchdown in Michigan history and later designed the Michigan Union.

The first intercollegiate football game in Michigan history was played against the "Purple Stockings" from Racine College on May 30, 1879, at the Chicago White Stockings' grounds in Lakefront Park (now part of Grant Park). The game began at 4:15 p.m. in front of a crowd of 500 spectators, amid heat described as "oppressive." The Chicago Daily Tribune called it "the first rugby-football game to be played west of the Alleghenies."

The game was played in two innings of 45 minutes. (The periods of play were referred to as "innings.") Irving Kane Pond (who later became a noted architect whose works include the Michigan Union) scored the first touchdown in Michigan football history midway through the first inning. According to Will Perry's history of Michigan football, the crowd responded with cheers of "Pond Forever." No points were scored for a touchdown, with a point being scored from touchdown only if the kick for goal after the touchdown succeeded. After Pond's touchdown, Michigan's team captain, David DeTarr, attempted the kick for goal. The Michigan players and umpire opined that the kick was good, but the referee ruled it had missed. The first inning ended at 4:55 p.m. with no points having been scored. Play was resumed after a ten-minute rest period.

In the second inning, Michigan scored the only point of the game on a place-kick by DeTarr after a catch by John Chase. The Chronicle wrote that the teams "fought like dogs of war" in the second inning, with the play of Chase leading to the yell of "Chase is there" repeated "at least twenty times." In its account of the game, the Racine Advocate wrote that the Purple Stockings "had the worst of it, the ball constantly near their goal." The Racine newspaper credited Michigan's passing and teamwork as the difference in the game: "Perfect harmony characterized the Michigan boys' playing, when one of them caught the ball he instantly passed it to a colleague nearer the enemy's goal ..."

During the game, telegrams were sent from Chicago to Ann Arbor with updates on the game. A boy was hired to deliver the updates by "velocipede" from the telegraph office to the campus. The updates were posted on a blackboard near the medical building, where a number of students gathered. When the final update was posted ("6:28 p.m.: Game finished, won by Michigan – one goal – kicked by DeTarr"), the gathering of students "manifested their feelings in the usual student manner."

=== First international game ===
Michigan's second intercollegiate football game was played in Detroit against the University of Toronto on November 1, 1879. A large number of students arrived from Ann Arbor on the Friday before the game, and a number of Canadian "excursionists" were also in the city. Another group of 250 students arrived in Detroit on the Saturday morning train from Ann Arbor and walked to Recreation Park to watch the game. Given the novelty of the game, the Detroit Free Press devoted much of its coverage to educating readers on the rules and methods of play. The paper described it as football "of the scientific kind in vogue in all universities and throughout England and her provinces, and known the world over as 'Rugby.'" The game was declared a draw after the teams played two hard-fought, 45-minute innings without either team scoring. The Free Press called it "One of The Most Exciting Sporting Events Ever Seen at Recreation Park."

=== 1880 game in Toronto ===
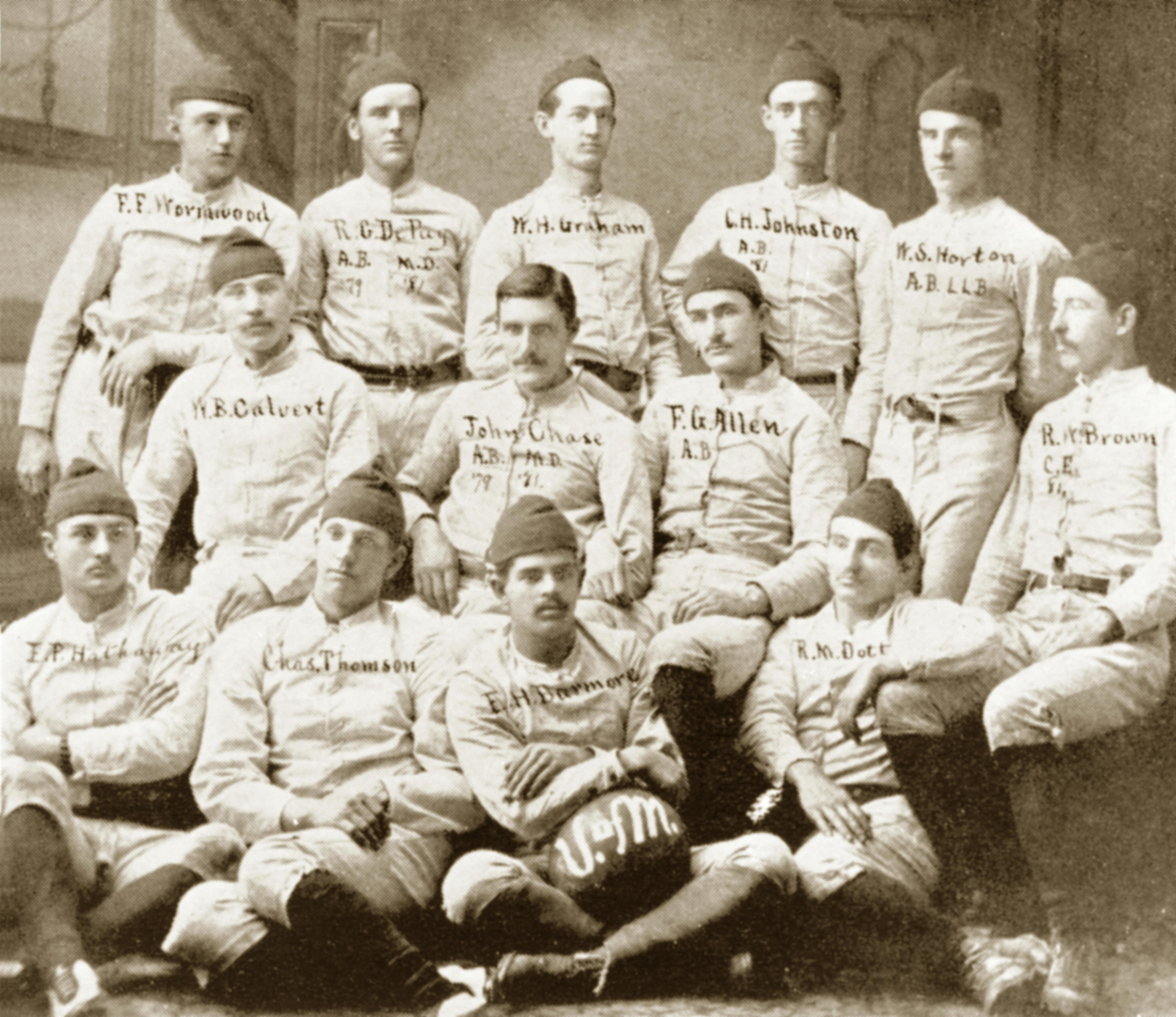
1880 Michigan football team

On November 6, 1880, the Michigan football team played its only game of the 1880 season against the team from the University of Toronto. The game was played at the Toronto Lacrosse Club and was the first game played by Michigan in a foreign country. The Chronicle described the playing conditions: "Throughout the whole of the first inning, the rain was increasing, and, joined with a cold wind from the north, soon drenched and all but froze both players and spectators. The ground was slippery and muddy, the water stood in pools, the ball was soon heavy, and in short circumstances were decidedly against either good playing or enjoyment of it." The temperature became colder in the later afternoon, and the Toronto team proposed ending the game after the first inning. The teams ultimately agreed to play a shortened second inning of 37 minutes. During the first inning, Michigan was aided by having the wind at its back and running downhill on a slightly sloped field. The game ended with Michigan ahead, 13–6.

=== 1881 Eastern tour ===
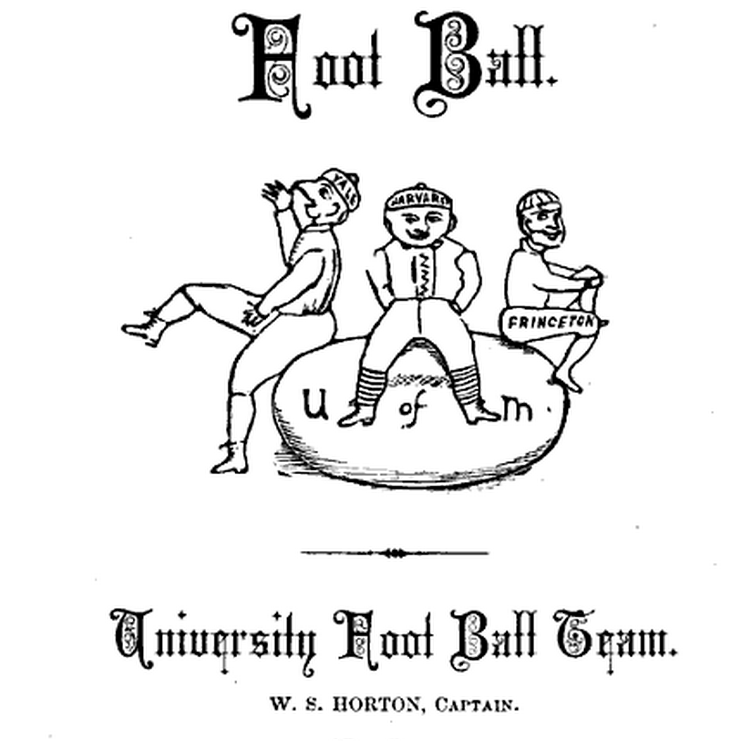
1881 Michigan Football Team Profile from "The Palladium"

In 1881, Michigan scheduled games against the powerhouses of American football—Harvard, Yale and Princeton. Those three teams won every national championship from 1869 to 1894. Prior to 1881, Michigan had played a game that was more in the nature of British rugby. One author observed: "When the Michigan rugby team went East in November 1881 they were playing a more traditional rugby game than their eastern counterparts." In his history of college football, David M. Nelson wrote: "In 1881 football became an intersectional game with the University of Michigan invading the East to play Harvard, Princeton and Yale."

Michigan played all three games over a five-day period between October 31, 1881, and November 4, 1881. While Michigan lost all three games, the games were close, and Michigan earned the respect of the Eastern press. The Harvard game, played on Halloween 1881, was the first time any of the elite Eastern teams had played a team from the West. Michigan played Harvard in "a drenching rain", and The Boston Journal reported that the Michigan players "were beaten but with fair weather the result would have been very uncertain. As it was, Harvard won more by luck than by superiority in strength or skill, for with the exception of the first ten minutes they were forced to play a defensive game." Michigan's worst defeat on the Eastern trip was an 11–0 defeat against Yale. The New Haven Evening Register reported: "The Yales outplayed their opponents in every particular, and kept the ball near their goal during the greater part of the game." The final game of the trip was a 13–4 loss to Princeton.

=== First game in Ann Arbor: 1883 ===
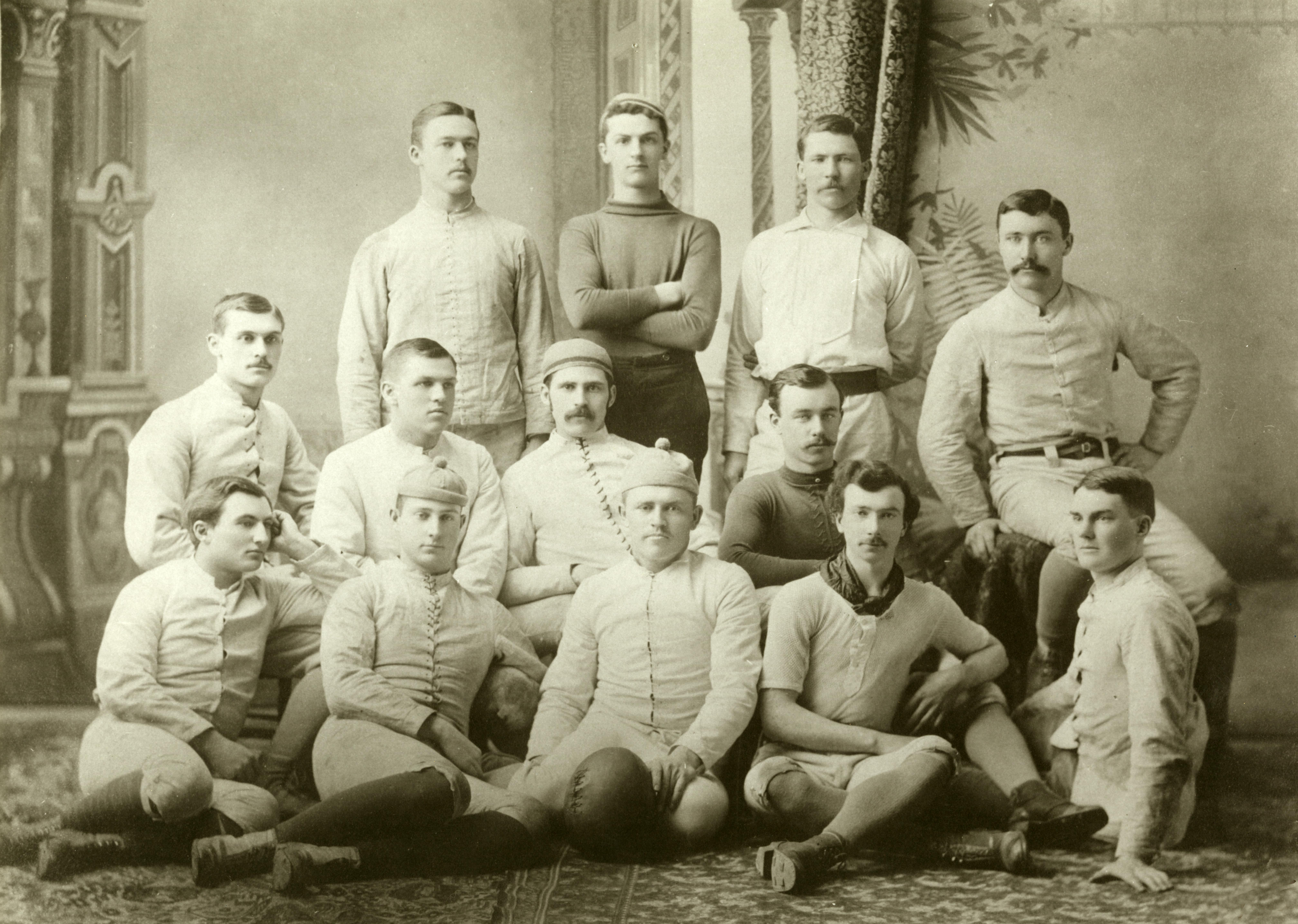
1883 Michigan Wolverines football team

After a hiatus in intercollegiate football in the fall of 1882, Michigan played its first home game on May 12, 1883, against the Detroit Independents at the Ann Arbor Fairgrounds. Michigan won the game, 40–5. In the fall of 1883, Michigan went on its second Eastern tour, playing four football games between November 19 and November 27. Michigan lost the first three games to Wesleyan, Yale, and Harvard. Although the New York Times has a firsthand account of the loss, Michigan historians have recorded the final game against Stevens Institute as a victory.

=== Undefeated from 1884 to 1887 ===
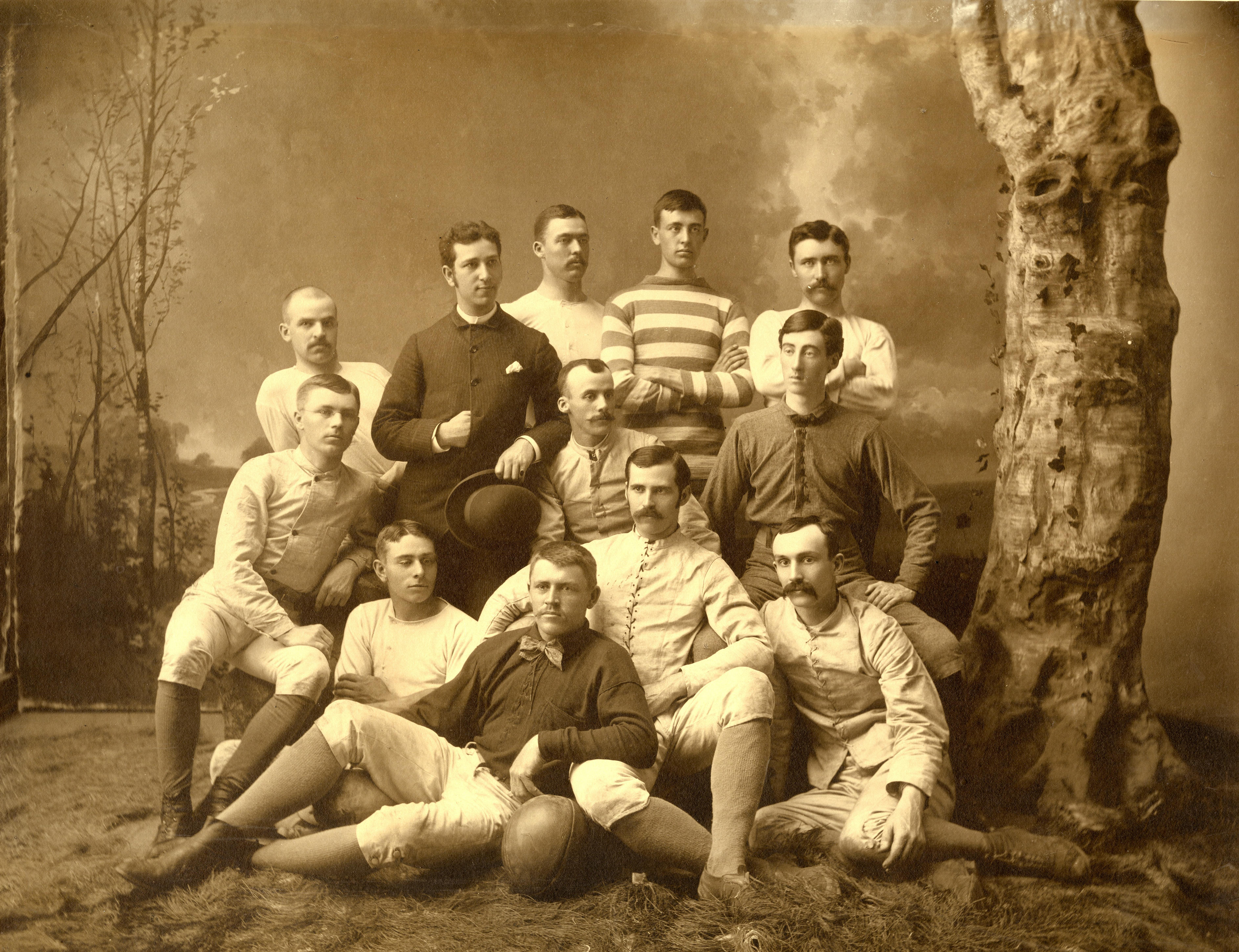
1884 Michigan Wolverines football team

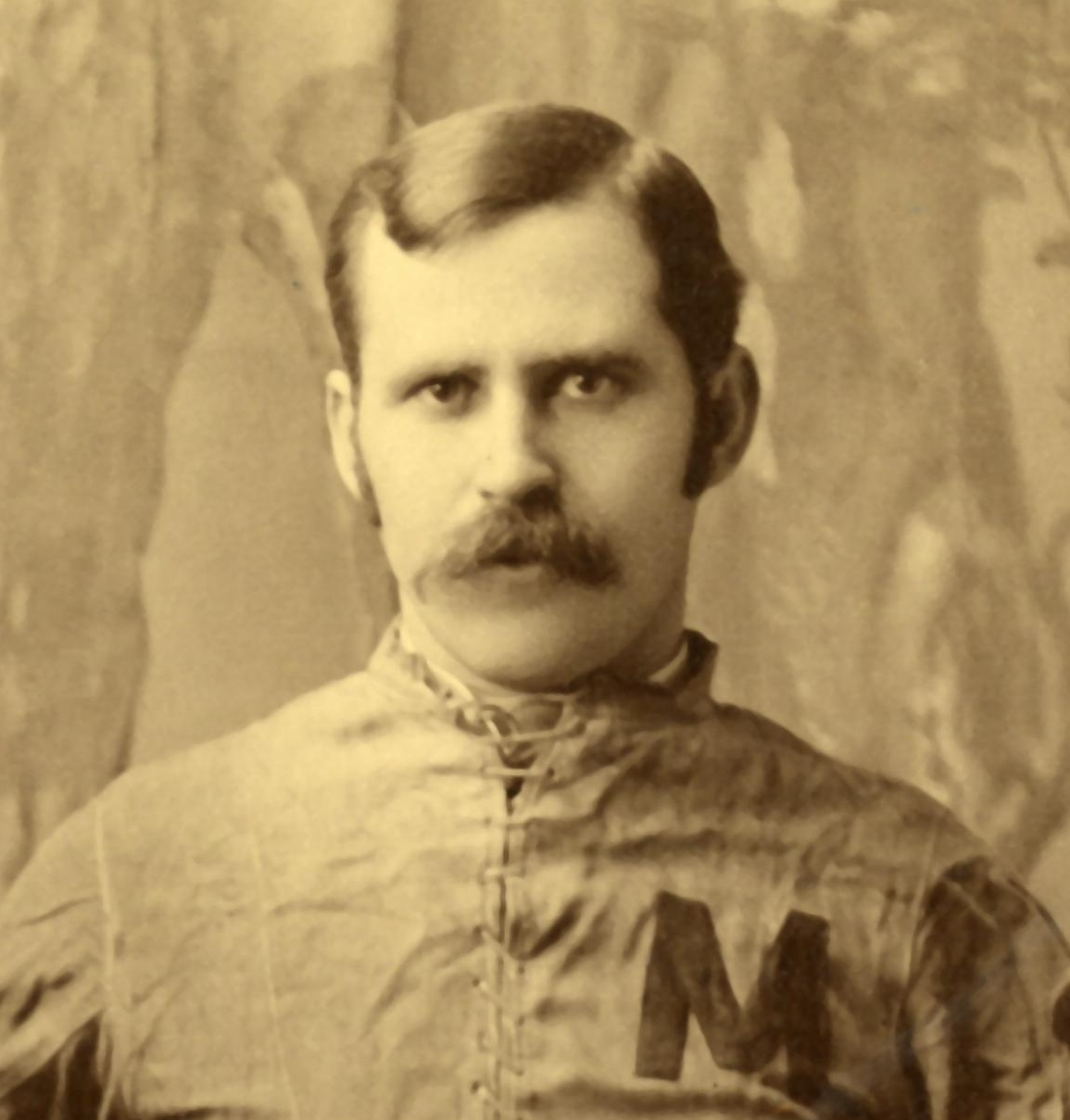
Horace Greely Prettyman played football at Michigan from 1882 to 1890.

In the years from 1884 to 1887, Michigan developed a reputation as the best football team in the West. During those four years, the Wolverines compiled an unbeaten record of 12–0 and outscored opponents 258 to 12. The Wolverines allowed their opponents to score only two points between November 1884 and April 1888. Horace Greely Prettyman was the captain of Michigan's football team for three straight years from 1884 to 1886 and played a total of eight years on the team (1882–1886, 1888–1890).

The 1884 season began with an 18–0 victory against Albion College. As Albion was the only other Michigan college with a football program in the 1880s, Michigan played Albion on a regular basis. The 1884 Albion game was played at the Ann Arbor Fairgrounds as part of an annual field day that included track and field events as well as the "collar and elbow", heavyweight boxing, tug-of-war, Indian club swinging, "catch-as-catch-can wrestling", "passing rugby ball" (won by Thomas H. McNeil with a distance of 116 feet), "chasing greased pig", lawn tennis, and a sprint exhibition by Michigan's national collegiate sprint champion Fred Bonine. The Detroit Free Press wrote that "[t]he game of Rugby between the University and Albion College [was] for the championship of Michigan."

Michigan concluded the 1884 season with an 18–10 victory over a Chicago team reportedly composed mostly of English business men "who learned to kick shins at the English public schools." The game was played according to "American college rules" which put the Chicago team at a disadvantage. After a Michigan touchdown, the game was paused briefly to allow the Chicago team to receive instruction on the American rules. The Detroit Free Press called it a "very exciting and hotly contested game", but the paper criticized the uneven condition of the playing field at the Ann Arbor Fairgrounds. The Chronicle wrote: "The game was by far the finest ever witnessed in Ann Arbor and has greatly increased the interest in Rugby."

One of the challenges facing the 1885 team was the lack of other college and university teams in proximity to Ann Arbor. Other major colleges and universities in the region had not yet established regular varsity football programs: Notre Dame, Purdue, Indiana, and Penn State did so in 1887; Northwestern in 1888; Iowa, Ohio State and Wisconsin in 1889; and Nebraska, Illinois, Pittsburgh, and Missouri in 1890. Michigan was left with the option of playing Albion College and club teams from Detroit, Chicago, and even Windsor, Ontario.

In March 1885, the Princess football team of Detroit challenged Michigan to a football game on roller skates to be played at a roller rink in Ann Arbor. In mid-March 1885, The Michigan Argonaut reported: "The Rugby team are [sic] now practicing football on rollers." The two teams ultimately met on April 3, 1885, for a Friday night game "on rollers" at the Palace Rink. The Wolverines defeated the Princess team "in two straight innings." The game is not recorded as an official game in Michigan's football records.

The 1885 season officially began with a home-and-away series against a team from Windsor, Ontario, Canada. The first game was played in Windsor under Canadian rules (allowing 15 men on the field per side). The return game against Windsor was the first to be played on the University of Michigan campus. The Michigan Argonaut applauded the Rugby Association's decision to move the game to campus, noting the "impossibility of playing an errorless game on [the] wretched turf" of the Ann Arbor Fairgrounds. The team concluded the 1885 season with a 42–0 victory on Thanksgiving Day against the Peninsular Cricket Club from Detroit.

Collegiate competition remained limited in 1886, and Michigan was forced to settle for two games against Albion. Michigan won both games by a combined score of 74 to 0.

=== Teaching football at Notre Dame ===
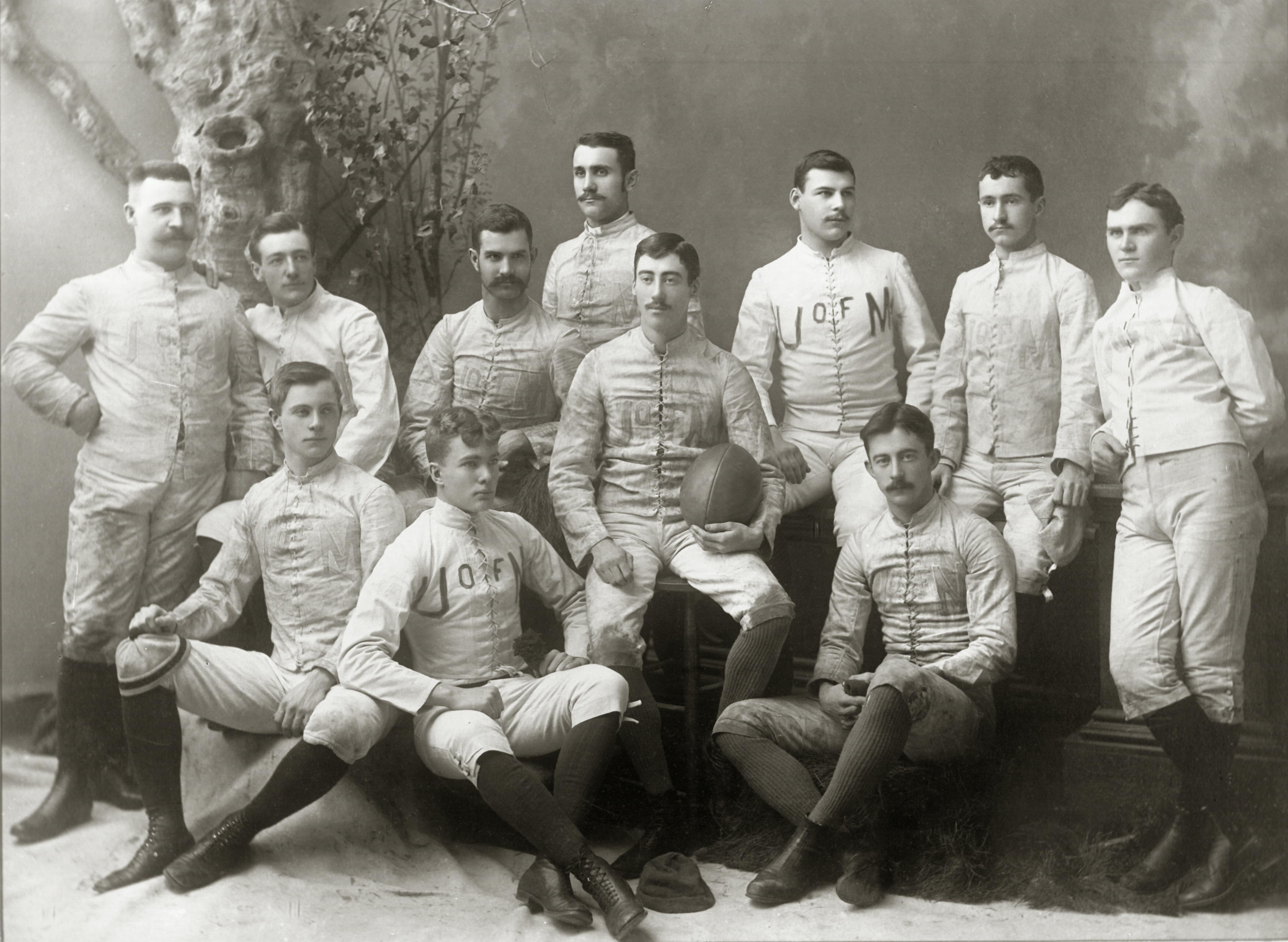
1887 Michigan Wolverines football team

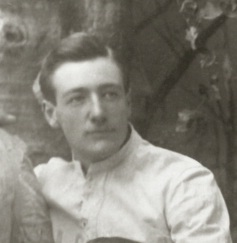
George DeHaven wrote to Brother Paul at Notre Dame in October 1887, describing the new game being played at Michigan.

Two players on Michigan's 1887 team, George DeHaven and William Harless, had previously attended Notre Dame. In October 1887, DeHaven wrote to Brother Paul, who ran Notre Dame's intramural athletics program, telling him about the new game of football. Michigan had planned a game in Chicago on Thanksgiving Day, and the three men, DeHaven, Harless and Brother Paul, persuaded their respective schools to play a football match on the Notre Dame campus on the day before Thanksgiving.

The Michigan team traveled to South Bend by train arriving early in the morning on the day of the game. The team was greeted by Father Superior Walsh and spent two hours touring the university buildings and departments of Notre Dame.

The game was the first played by a Notre Dame football team, and the Michigan team was credited with teaching the game to the Notre Dame players before the game began. The Notre Dame student newspaper, Scholastic, reported: "It was not considered a match contest, as the home team had been organized only a few weeks, and the Michigan boys, the champions of the West, came more to instruct them in the points of the Rugby game than to win fresh laurels." The proceedings began with a tutorial session in which players from both teams were divided irrespective of college. For the first 30 minutes, the teams scrimmaged in a practice game with Michigan "exchanging six men for the same number from Notre Dame."

After the practice session, the Michigan and Notre Dame teams played a game that lasted only half an hour. The Chronicle reported: "The grounds were in very poor condition for playing, being covered with snow in a melting condition, and the players could scarcely keep their feet. Some time had been spent in preliminary practice; the game began and after rolling and tumbling in the mud for half an hour time was finally called, the score standing 8 to 0 in favor of U. of M."

After the game, the team ate at the Notre Dame dining hall. The Notre Dame student newspaper reported: "After a hearty dinner, Rev. President Walsh thanked the Ann Arbor team for their visit, and assured them of the cordial reception that would always await them at Notre Dame." Brother Paul arranged for carriages to take the team to Niles in time to catch the 3:00 train to Chicago. The Notre Dame paper reported: "At 1 o'clock carriages were taken for Niles, and amidst rousing cheers the University of Michigan football team departed, leaving behind them a most favorable impression."

After Michigan's visit to South Bend in November 1887, football became a popular game on the Notre Dame campus. A football association was formed with Brother Paul as the president. In the spring of 1888, Brother Paul challenged Michigan to return to South Bend. Two games were scheduled for a weekend in April 1888. Michigan won the first game by a score of 26 to 6. Before the game was played, a 100-yard dash was run with players from both teams participating. Michigan's James E. Duffy defeated Harry Jewett, the American sprint champion, in the race. The second game was played the next day, after the players were taken for a boat ride on St. Joseph's Lake. Michigan won by a score of 10 to 4.

Some Michigan fans were disappointed that Notre Dame had scored, breaking the Wolverines' four-year streak of not allowing a point since November 1883. DeHaven recalled that, when the Michigan players returned to Ann Arbor, they were not greeted warmly: "It was a badly battered team that landed in the crowded Ann Arbor depot, and we received a proper razzing for breaking a four-year record."

=== Theodore Roosevelt visits in 1888 ===
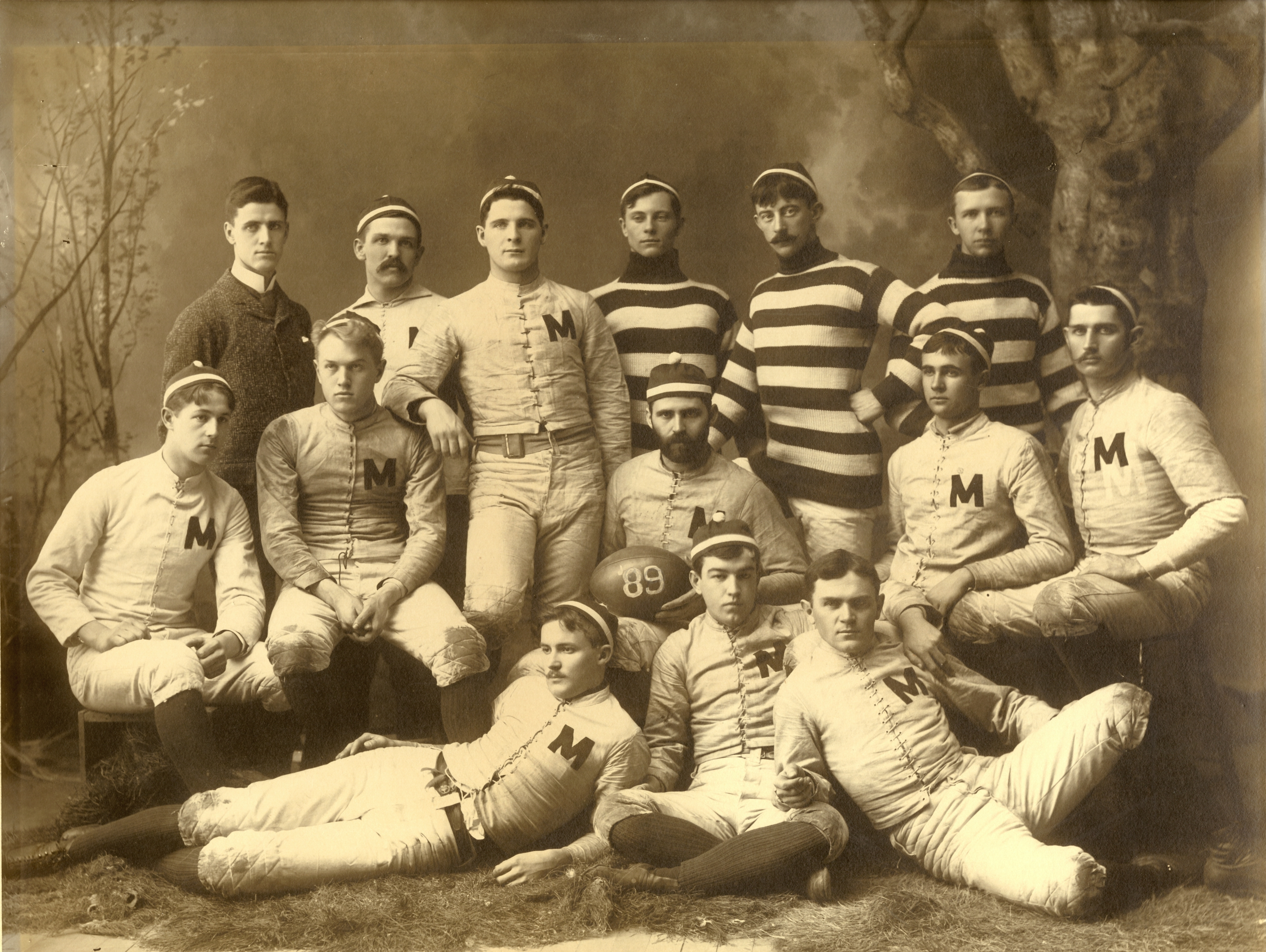
1888 Michigan team about which Theodore Roosevelt said it was "not healthy to get in the way of the U. of M. rugby team."

As the 1888 season began, Michigan had not lost a football game since 1883 and was considered the best football team in the West. On October 17, 1888, Theodore Roosevelt, introduced as a "scholar and writer of New York", visited the Michigan campus and delivered a speech. The Chronicle reported on Roosevelt's comments directed at the football team: "Theo. Roosevelt has no fear of the murderous Sioux or of a cattle stampede, but he does claim that it is not healthy to get in the way of the U. of M. rugby team."

Michigan opened its 1888 season with a 14–6 victory over the Detroit Athletic Club at the Club's grounds in Detroit. The game attracted considerable interest and curiosity. The Detroit Free Press described the athletic grounds as "a gay scene" with young men "scampering over the field" in picturesque suits consisting of "close-fitting knitted caps of gay colors, canvas jackets and knickerbockers, stockings of various colors and shoes of all kind." The paper wrote approvingly of the game: "The spectacle of twenty muscular young men in one colossal heap, struggling, pulling, hauling, pushing, with arms, legs and caps flying in every direction is an exciting and certainly novel one. ... All the ground and lofty tumbling was for the possession of a leather-covered foot ball, which every one of those twenty-two athletes had evidently determined to possess or perish in the attempt. ... While one unaccustomed to foot ball will naturally be startled by some of the acrobatic feats, still it is impossible to watch the game for any length of time without a tingling of the blood and holding of the breath. It is most intensely exciting, continuous in action and replete with fine points of play."

The following week, the Wolverines defeated Albion College at the Ann Arbor Fairgrounds by a score of 76–4. Michigan's 76 points established a single-game scoring record that was not exceeded until 1901. Albion's four points were awarded after the visitors disputed a call made by the officials and threatened to leave the grounds. The Albion players were persuaded to continue with the game "upon a concession of four points by the home team."

Michigan concluded its 1888 season with a 26–4 loss on Thanksgiving Day game against the Chicago University Club at the Chicago Baseball Park. It was attended by 3,000 persons, and the proceeds were given to charities. The New York Times and Outing magazine both called it "undoubtedly the greatest football event that ever took place in the West." The Chicago University Club team was a "picked team" selected from the best athletes in the West, many of whom had played college football for Yale, Princeton, Harvard, or Columbia. The New York Times wrote that "the preparatory schools and the universities had been drained for the best talent in sight."

Early in the contest, Michigan's starting center Horace Greely Prettyman was ejected for "slugging" an opposing player in the mouth. The New York Times called Prettyman "the backbone of the Michigan rush line" and noted that the team was disheartened after his ejection. The Chicago team took an 18–0 lead at halftime. In the second half, Michigan halfback and captain James E. Duffy scored Michigan's only touchdown "by good running and dodging." The New York Times wrote that Duffy played with "wonderful skill" and noted that many observers thought that Duffy's play was "the chief feature of the game." The Chronicle expressed the hope that the game would spark interest in football in the West and opined that "the fever may now be said to be upon us."

=== Racial integration in 1890 ===
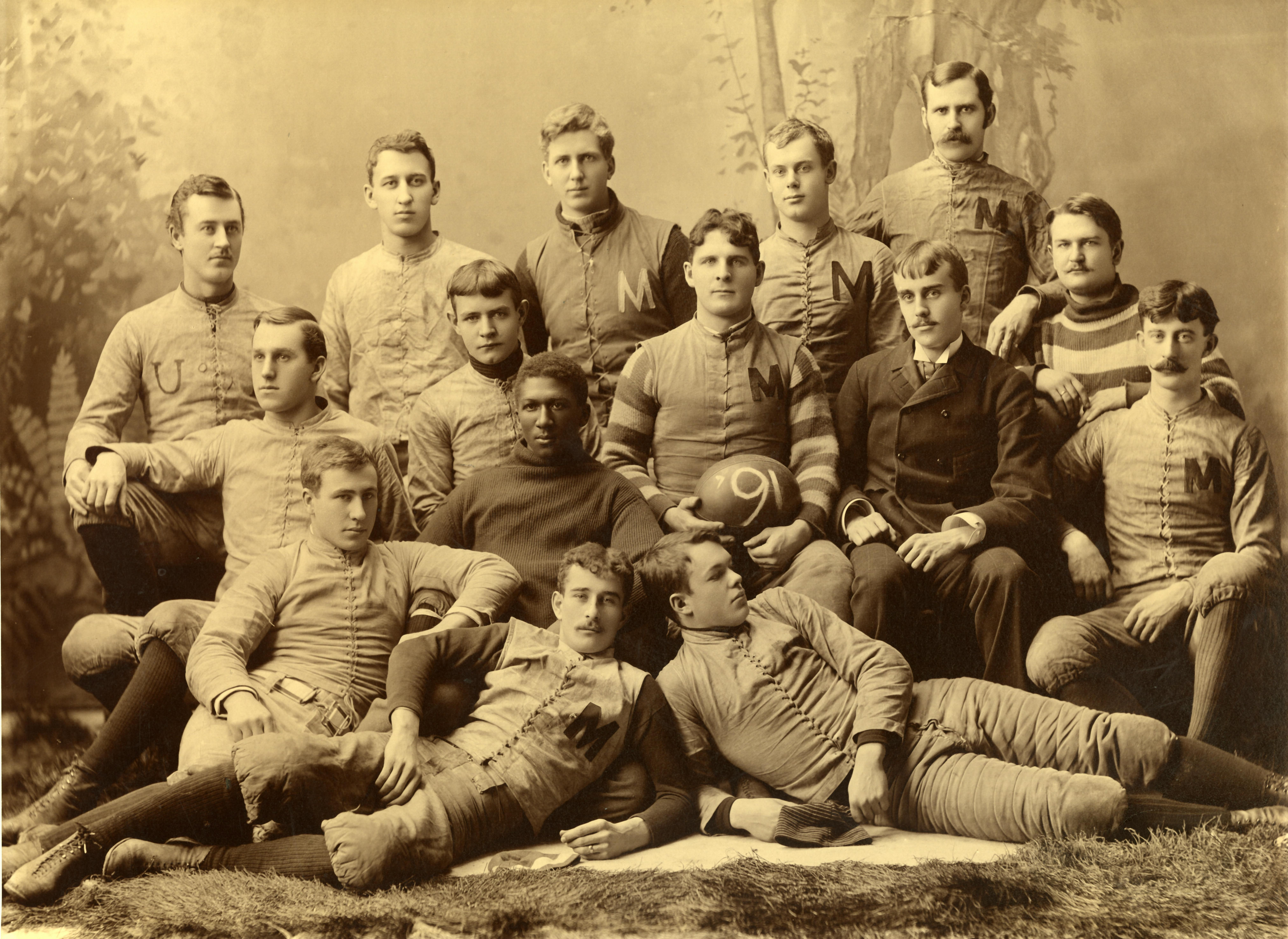
Michigan's first integrated football team in 1890 – George Jewett in second row

In 1890, Michigan compiled a 4–1 record and outscored its opponents by a combined score of 129 to 36. George Jewett, who played at the fullback and halfback positions, became the first African American to play football at Michigan.

Jewett grew up in Ann Arbor as the son of a successful blacksmith. He attended Ann Arbor High School where he was the class valedictorian in 1889 and captain of the debate, football and baseball teams. He was also the fastest sprinter in the Midwest, having won the Amateur Athletic Union 100-yard dash competition. At Michigan, he was the football team's leading rusher, scorer and kicker. Jewett was regarded as "one of the greatest stars" in early years of Michigan football.

After a 38–0 victory over the Detroit Athletic Club in Detroit, The Chronicle-Argonaut wrote: "Jewett's play was a revelation to the Detroiters and his work was fully up to standard." The following week, Jewett accounted for a touchdown and kicked two goals in a 16-0 victory over Albion.

In 1892, Jewett scored four touchdowns in Michigan's game against an Oberlin College team coached by John Heisman. Heisman described Jewett as a "superior athlete." In addition to scoring four touchdowns, Jewett made a touchdown-saving tackle in the Oberlin game, catching up with an Oberlin player from behind at the five-yard line after a 90-yard run. After Oberlin scored to go ahead 24–22, the referee (an Oberlin player acting as referee in the second half) announced that time had run out and called the game. The umpire (a Michigan man) ruled that four minutes remained on the game clock owing to timeouts that Oberlin's timekeeper had not recorded. As the Oberlin team left the field claiming victory, Michigan lined up, snapped the ball, and Jewett walked the ball 45 yards across the goal line for Michigan's fifth touchdown. The next day, The Michigan Daily reported: "Oberlin compromised herself by leaving the field before time was up. ... Referee Ensworth, an Oberlin substitute, lost all tab of time, and called the game at 14 minutes to 5, while the captain of each team had agreed to play until 10 minutes of that hour." Both schools still record the game as a victory.

Jewett transferred to Northwestern University in 1893 where he received a medical degree and also became the first African-American to play for the Northwestern Wildcats football team. Jewett returned to Ann Arbor in 1899 and was listed as a janitor in the 1900 Census. He later operated a dry-cleaning business in Ann Arbor called The Valet and died in 1908 at age 38.

=== Michigan's first football coach ===
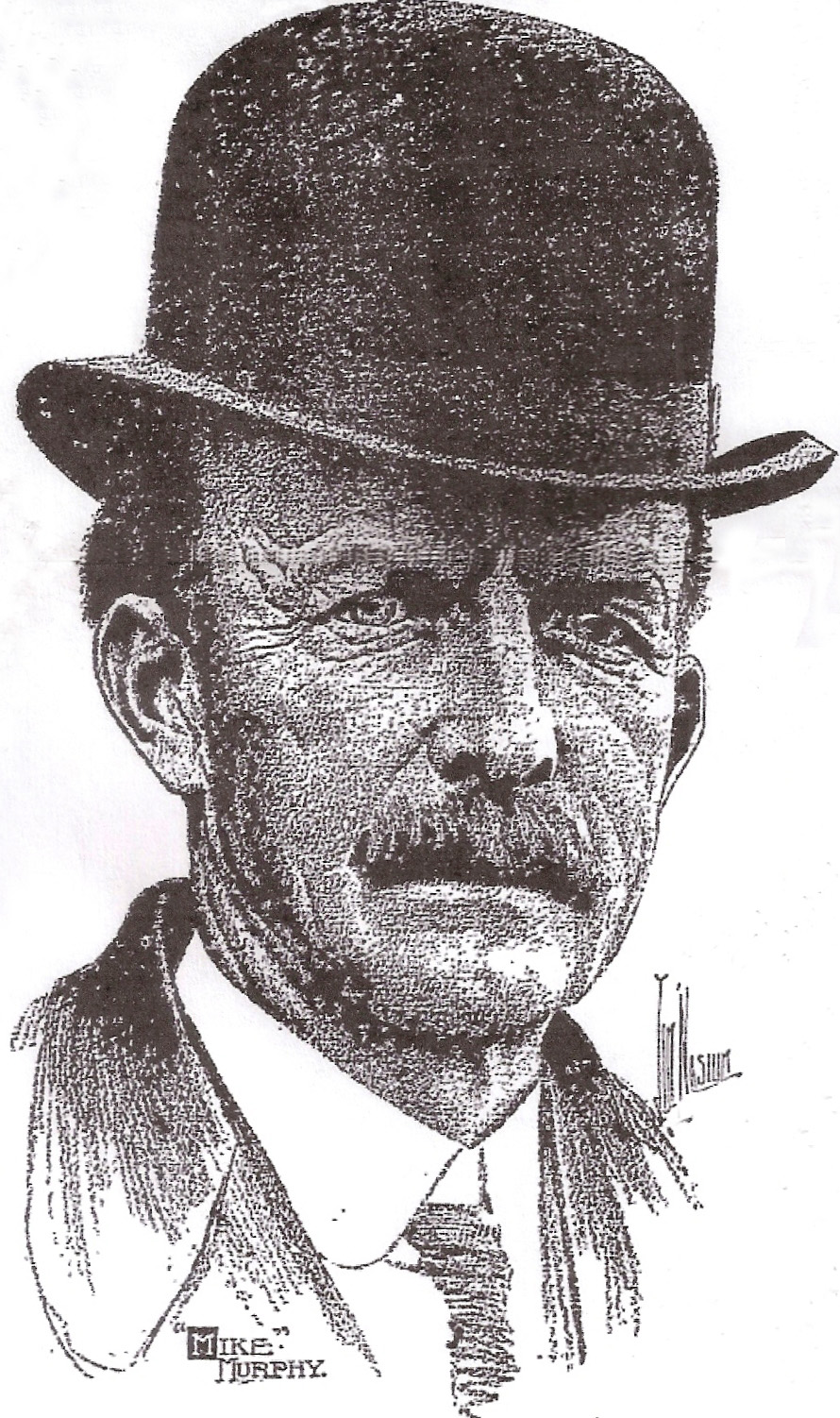
Mike Murphy, coach and trainer of the 1891 team

The 1891 season was the first in which the Michigan football team had a coach. In his history of the University of Michigan, Wilfred Byron Shaw cites the hiring of Frank Crawford as a watershed moment in the history of the school's football program: "A new era in the history of football at Michigan began in 1891, when with a fair schedule and an experienced coach, Frank Crawford … the systematic development of a team began ..." Crawford was an 1891 graduate of Yale University who was enrolled at the University of Michigan School of Law. As a first-year law student, Crawford was both the unpaid coach and a substitute player for the 1891 team.

There is some inconsistency in how coaching responsibilities for the 1891 team have been recorded. While Crawford has been identified by several sources as Michigan's first football coach, others indicate that Crawford and Mike Murphy were the joint head coaches in 1891. Still others indicate that Murphy was the one directing the team, or that Murphy relinquished the coaching duties to Crawford midway through the season to focus on his duties as trainer. Murphy was a nationally-known athletic trainer who had been hired by the Detroit Athletic Club where he trained John Owen and Harry M. Jewett, who became the fastest sprinters in the country.

Adding to the confusion over 1891 coaching responsibilities, the Chicago Daily Tribune reported in November 1891 that the Michigan team was "coached systematically" by four individuals—Murphy, Crawford, Horace Greely Prettyman and James Duffy.

After opening the 1891 season with a 62–0 victory over Ann Arbor High School, the team lost for the first time to Albion College by a score of 10–4. After the loss to Albion, Michigan won three straight games, then lost the final four games of the season for a record of 4-5.

=== Western College Athletic League ===
In April 1892, representatives of several Western colleges met at the Grand Pacific Hotel in Chicago where they formed the Western College Athletic League to compete in football, baseball and track. "The plans of the league are to have a series of base ball games in the spring, an inter-collegiate field day to be held in Chicago in June and a series of foot-ball games in the fall." The members of the new league were the University of Wisconsin, University of Michigan, Northwestern University, and the University of Minnesota. The Western College Athletic League laid the foundation for what later became the Big Ten Conference. With the new alliance in place, Michigan played several teams that would become its long-time rivals. The 1892 season included Michigan's first-ever games against Wisconsin, Minnesota, and Northwestern.

=== Rivalry with Chicago starts ===
The University of Chicago held its first classes in October 1892, and on November 13, 1892, Michigan played its first game against the Chicago Maroons football team. Michigan had originally been scheduled to play Lehigh, but the opponent was changed on short notice to Chicago. The game was played on a wet and muddy field in front of a crowd estimated by various accounts at between 700 and 1,500 spectators at Olympic Park in Toledo, Ohio. Michigan won the inaugural game by a score of 18 to 10. Amos Alonzo Stagg, at age 30, was both the coach and starting right halfback for the 1892 Chicago Maroons.

The Chicago Maroons quickly became Michigan's principal football rivalry. In the first nine games of the series, played from 1892 to 1900, Michigan compiled a record of 5–4.

=== Victory over Cornell in 1894 ===
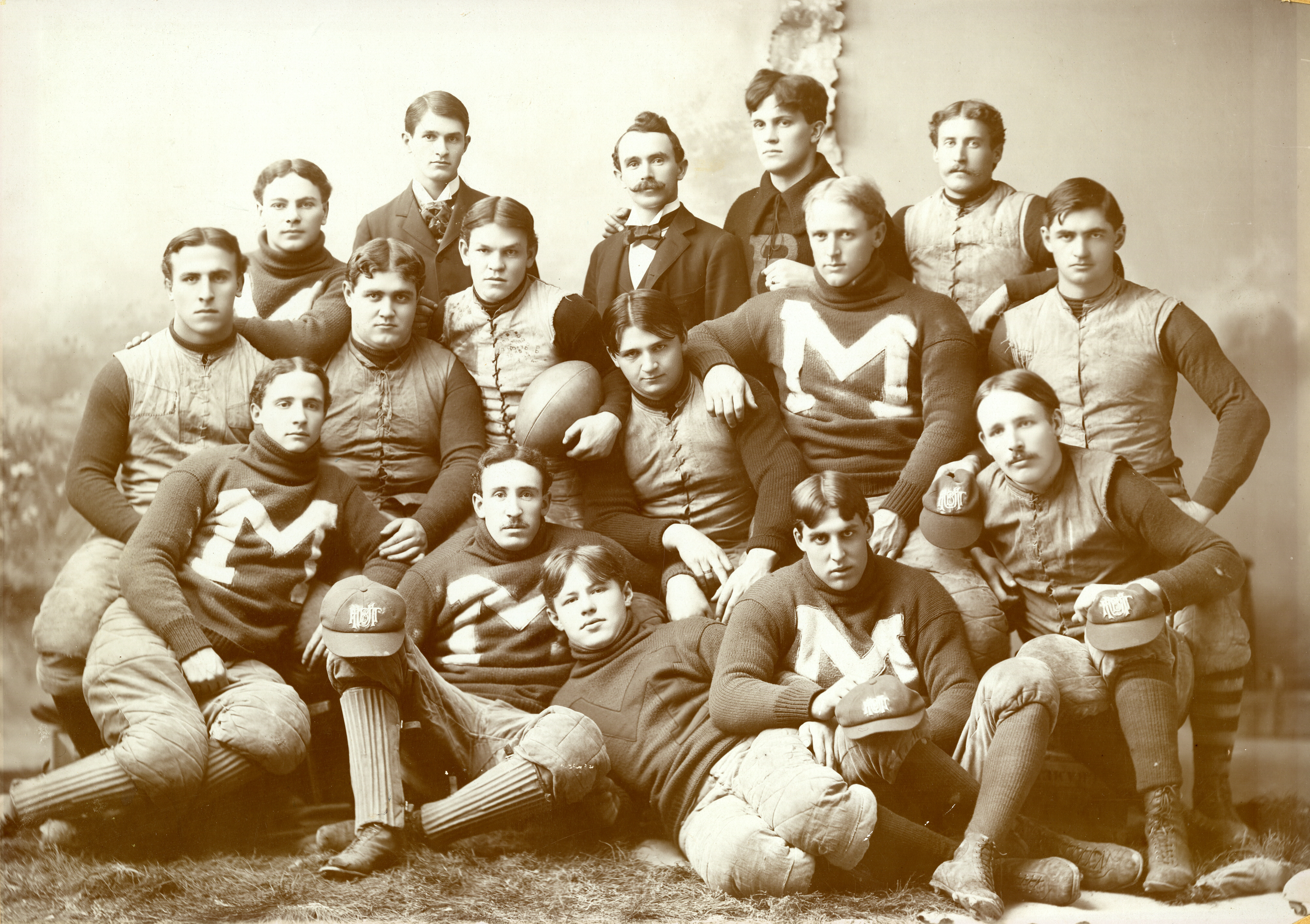
1894 Michigan Wolverines football team

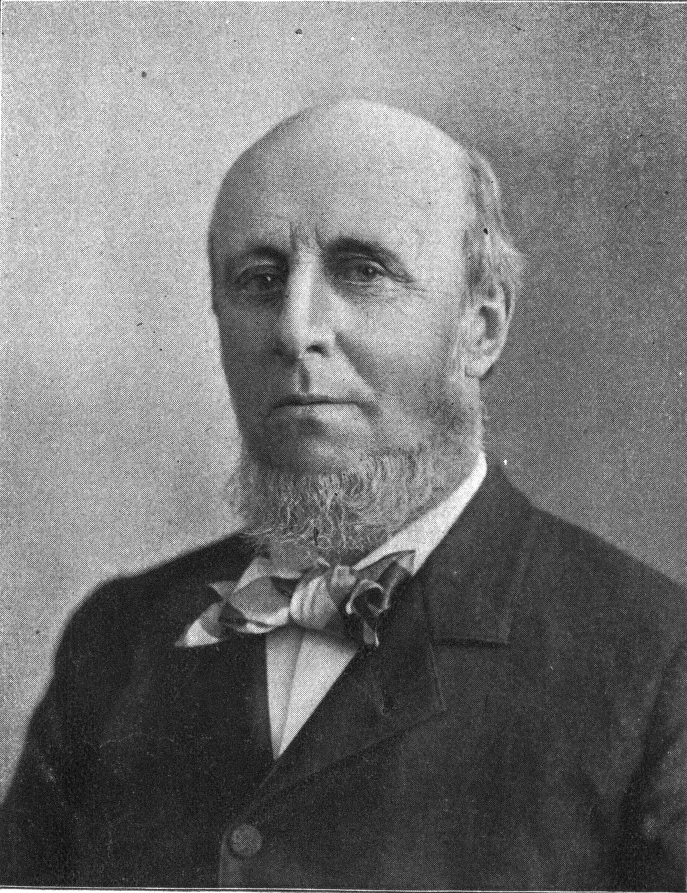
Michigan President James B. Angell said the victory over Cornell promoted a "broad, generous university spirit" that "makes us feel here one interest and common joy."

Prior to the start of the 1894 season, three individuals took charge of the Michigan football program — each of whom would play an important role in its development. The first was Charles A. Baird, manager of the football team who later became Michigan's first athletic director and was the person who hired Fielding H. Yost in 1901. In 1894, Baird hired William McCauley, who had played on Princeton's 1893 championship team, as Michigan's head football coach. In two years as Michigan's head coach, McCauley led the Wolverines to a 17–2–1 record. The third member of Michigan's football triumvirate in 1894 was Keene Fitzpatrick, a nationally known track coach, who Baird hired as the football team's trainer.

The 1894 team compiled a record of 9–1–1 and ended the season with consecutive victories over Cornell and Chicago. When Michigan played Cornell in Detroit, 2,000 students traveled from Ann Arbor to watch the game. The game attracted 4,000 spectators, the largest crowd that had attended a game in Detroit.

When the game ended, "[t]he crowd went wild, and hats, canes and everything available flew into the air. Over the ropes went the crowd and the fortunate players were picked up and carried from the field." A group of 500 students, stretching a block in length, towed a large green bus carrying the team from the athletic grounds. The procession moved loudly up Woodward Avenue with the team in tow until the bus reached Russell House where the team spent the night. According to the Detroit Free Press, the city was given over to "the U. of M. boys" for the night: "Wherever one turned he was confronted with the din and tumult; the ear-splitting yells from throats with vocal chords of extraordinary vibratory possibilities." The police "showed no disposition to exercise any authority to quell this miniature riot. Probably they knew that it would be like battling with the raging elements, and wisely resorted to extreme discretion."

The victory over Cornell was the first by a Michigan football team against one of the elite Eastern football teams. One newspaper wrote: "The victory places Michigan in the position of worthy foeman of Yale, Harvard, Princeton or Pennsylvania." The Detroit Free Press filled its front page with a lengthy account of the game under the headline, "GLORIOUS!" and proclaimed the start of "halcyon days at the university". The University of Michigan yearbook, The Palladium, wrote: "The enthusiasm of that day at Detroit transformed our foot ball team from the practically 'backwoods' organization that they were to skillful, scientific players of the great American game of foot ball. Let the good work go on."

On the Monday evening following the game, 3,000 students gathered for a mass meeting in University Hall to celebrate the victory. University President James Burrill Angell told the crowd, "I have been asked often today, 'What will be the effect of the game?' I am neither a prophet or the son of a prophet, but there is one thing of great value that I believe will result. ... I think the benefit of victory lies in the cultivation of this broad, generous university spirit that pervades all departments and makes us feel here one interest and common joy." After the mass meeting, the students gathered until midnight around a large bonfire on the campus. The Michigan Alumnus credited the victory over Cornell with the formation of permanent alumni associations in various cities.

=== Champions of the West in 1895 ===
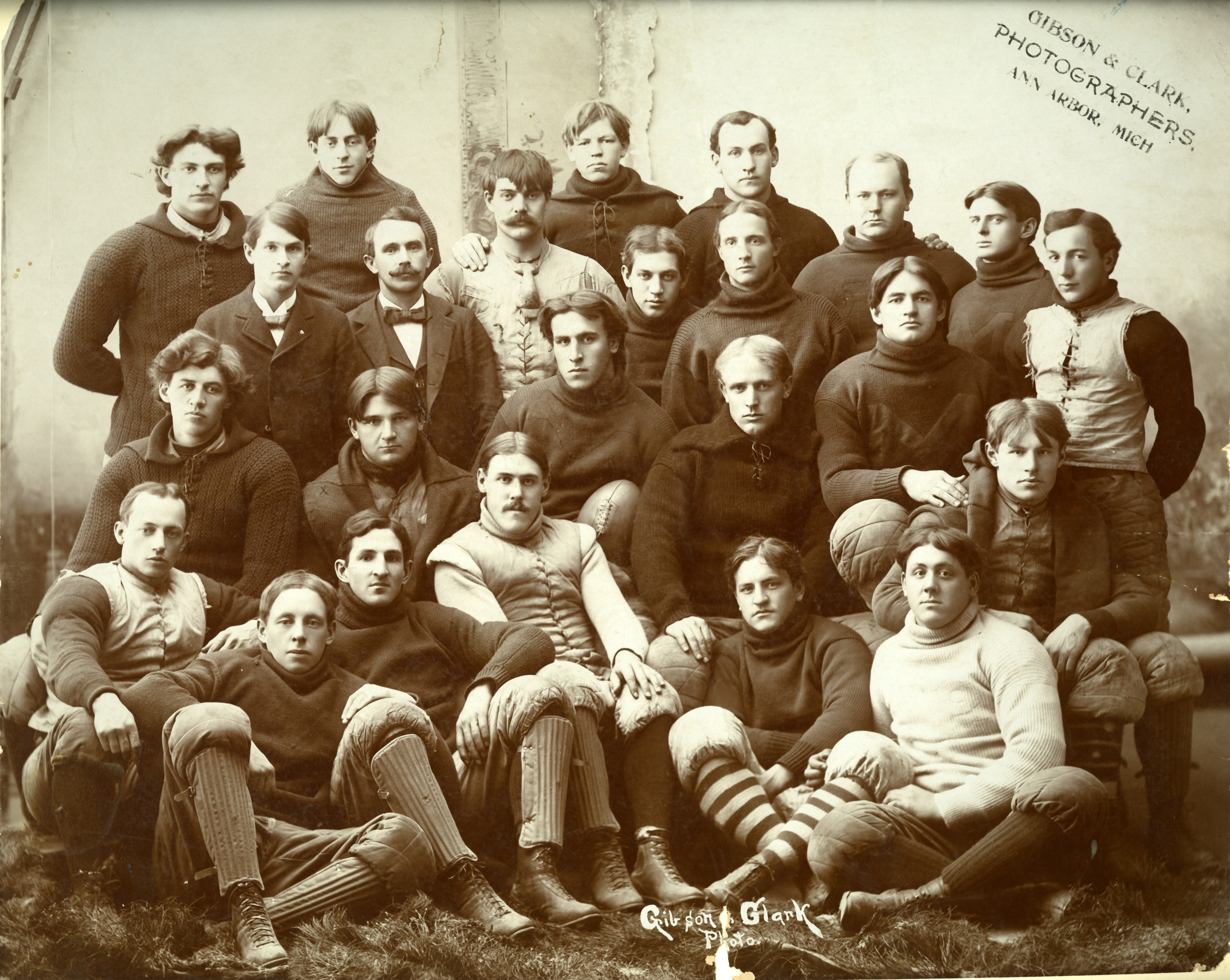
1895 Michigan Wolverines football team

The 1895 Michigan team compiled an 8–1 record, won their first five games by a combined score of 220 to 0, and outscored all opponents by a combined total of 266 to 14.

In the third game of the 1895 season, Michigan defeated the team from Cleveland's Western Reserve, also known as Adelbert College, by a score of 64 to 0. The margin of victory was a surprise as Adelbert had won the Western football championship in 1894 and had narrowly lost to Cornell the previous week by a score of 12 to 4. Against Michigan, however, Adelbert had the ball only five or six minutes in the entire game and, as one newspaper wrote, "was never in the hunt."

The only setback was a 4–0 loss to Harvard on November 9, 1895. Harvard was then one of the leading football powers, winning three national championships in the 1890s. The game was played on a wet, muddy field in Cambridge, Massachusetts as a "drizzling rain fell throughout the game." Michigan's offense had success in easily making holes in Harvard's line, but lost the ball repeatedly through off-side penalties. Due to the field conditions, both teams played a kicking game, punting the ball back and forth to gain advantage in field position. In the second half, Harvard kicked to Michigan's 18-yard line, and John A. Bloomingston immediately attempted to punt the ball back to Harvard. A Harvard player blocked the punt, and the ball was driven behind the goal line where another Harvard player fell on it for a touchdown. Harvard failed to convert its goal after touchdown resulting in the score of 4 to 0.

Despite the loss, one newspaper wrote: "[T]he wearers of the Crimson have not had such a battle before in years. The boys from Michigan simply covered themselves in glory by their splendid work." Edwin Denby, a Michigan player who later became U.S. Secretary of the Navy, later wrote that Michigan had traveled to "the distant and holy places of the East" and proved "to the reasonable people of the country that the men who came out of the West knew one or two games besides mumblepeg and marbles.""

The Wolverines finished the 1895 season by shutting out Minnesota (20–0) and Chicago (12–0). After the Chicago game, The World of New York wrote that the Michigan players had "clinched their claim to the Western championship."

=== Indoor football under electric lights ===
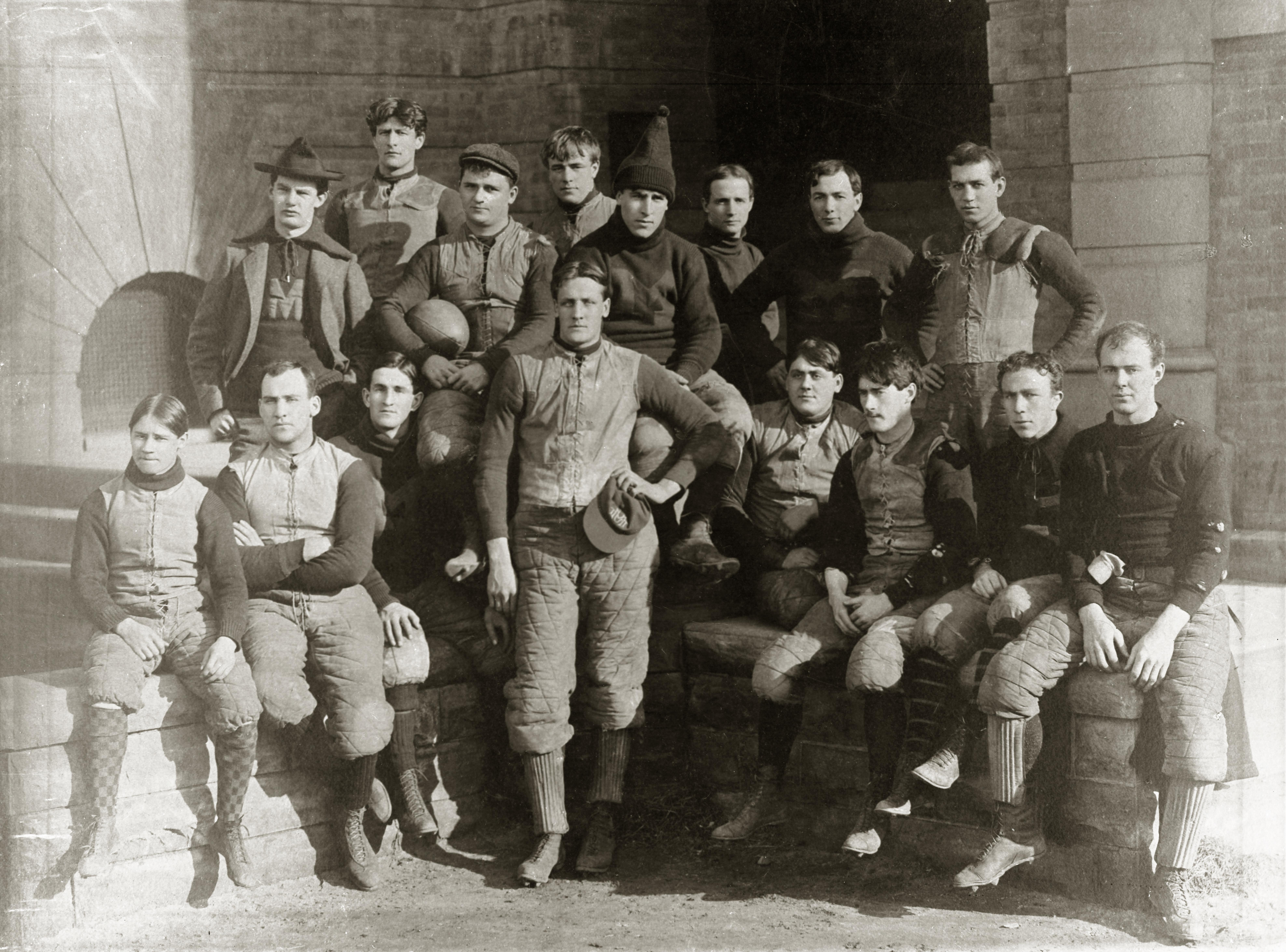
1896 Michigan Wolverines football team

In 1896, Michigan was a member of the newly formed Western Conference (later known as the Big Ten Conference). Under the guidance of a new head coach, William Ward, the Wolverines did not allow an opposing team to score a point in the first six games of the season. The team won nine consecutive games in which it outscored opponents 256 to 4.

The first close game of the 1896 season came in early November against Minnesota. Playing in Minneapolis, the Wolverines won, 6–4. When Michigan scored a touchdown in the second half, Michigan fans in the bleachers signaled the event with cowbells. Minnesota responded with a touchdown (worth 4 points under 1896 rules), but the score came at the far corner of the field where a straight kick for the goal after touchdown (worth 2 points) was impossible. Accordingly, Minnesota attempted a double kick, kicking the ball first to the fullback who caught the ball so close to the goal posts that his kick for goal "was easily stopped by Michigan players."

On Thanksgiving Day 1896, Michigan faced the Chicago Maroons coached by Amos Alonzo Stagg. The Maroons defeated the Wolverines, 7–6, depriving Michigan of the first Western Conference football championship. Chicago's scoring came on a blocked punt resulting in a safety and a drop kick (worth five points under the rules at the time) by Clarence Herschberger from the 45–yard line. Michigan's sole touchdown came in the second half when Frederick Henninger was pushed into the endzone from the two-yard line. The most unusual feature of the 1896 game was that it was played indoors at the Chicago Coliseum and was "the first collegiate game of football played under a roof." Adding to the novelty, as daylight turned to darkness, the field inside the Coliseum was lit with electric lighting. After the field grew dark in the second half, and game was halted for ten minutes to discuss whether to continue. Play was resumed, and the lights were finally turned on after Michigan scored a touchdown. The press proclaimed the experiment in indoor football to be a success:

One thing at least was settled by the game, and that is, that indoor football is literally and figuratively speaking a howling success. The men had no trouble in catching punts, and football was played on its merits, without the handicaps of a wet field or a strong wind. Toward the end of the second half it got very dark, and the spectators were treated to a novelty in the shape of football by electric light.

Another newspaper wrote: "Indoor football is an innovation, but it promises to become a permanency for late games. While the other fields about Chicago were sloppy and the players were floundering about in the seas of mud, the athletes in the Coliseum played on dry surface and secure from the elements."

=== Champions of the West in 1898 ===
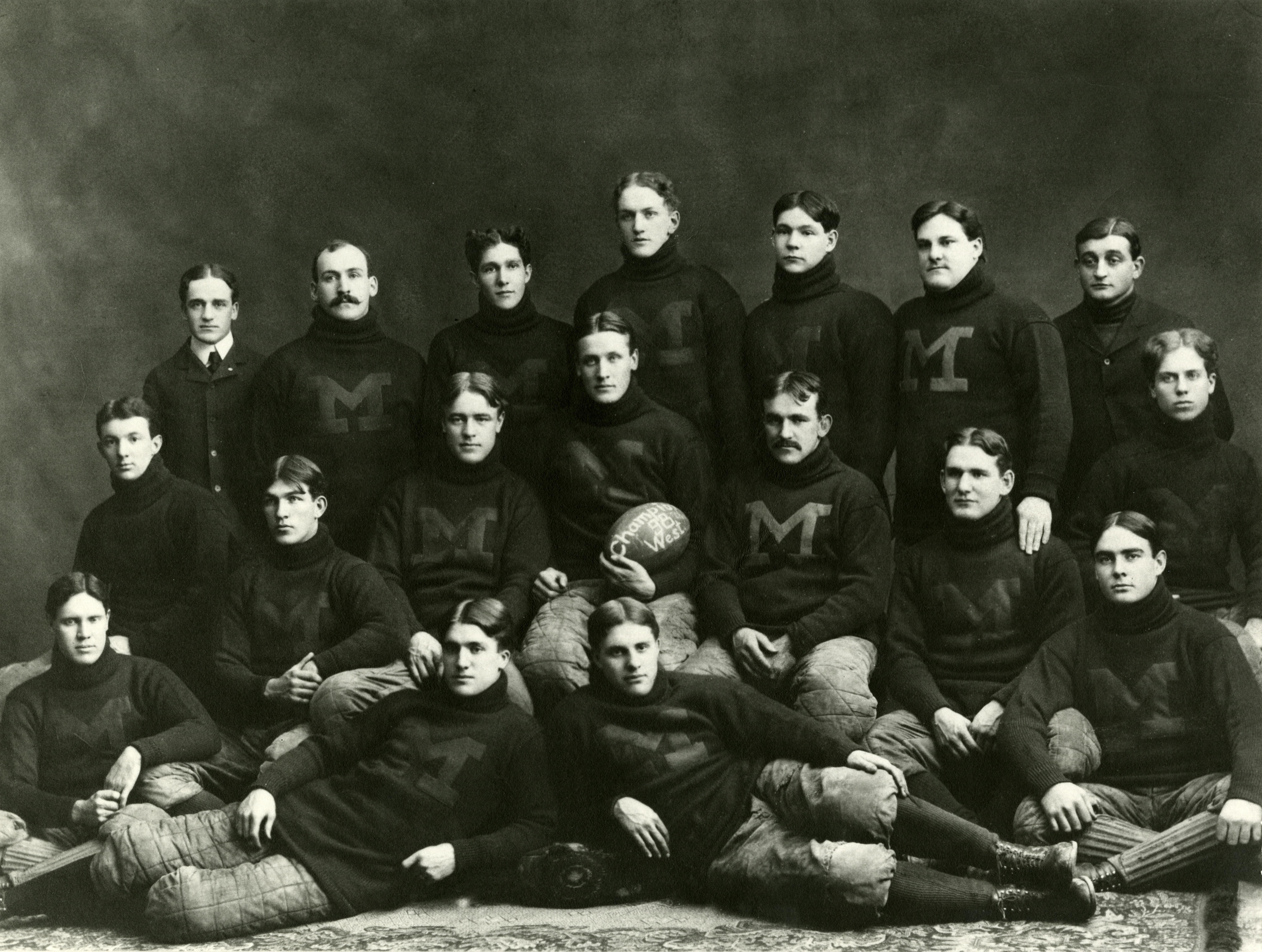
1898 Michigan Wolverines football team

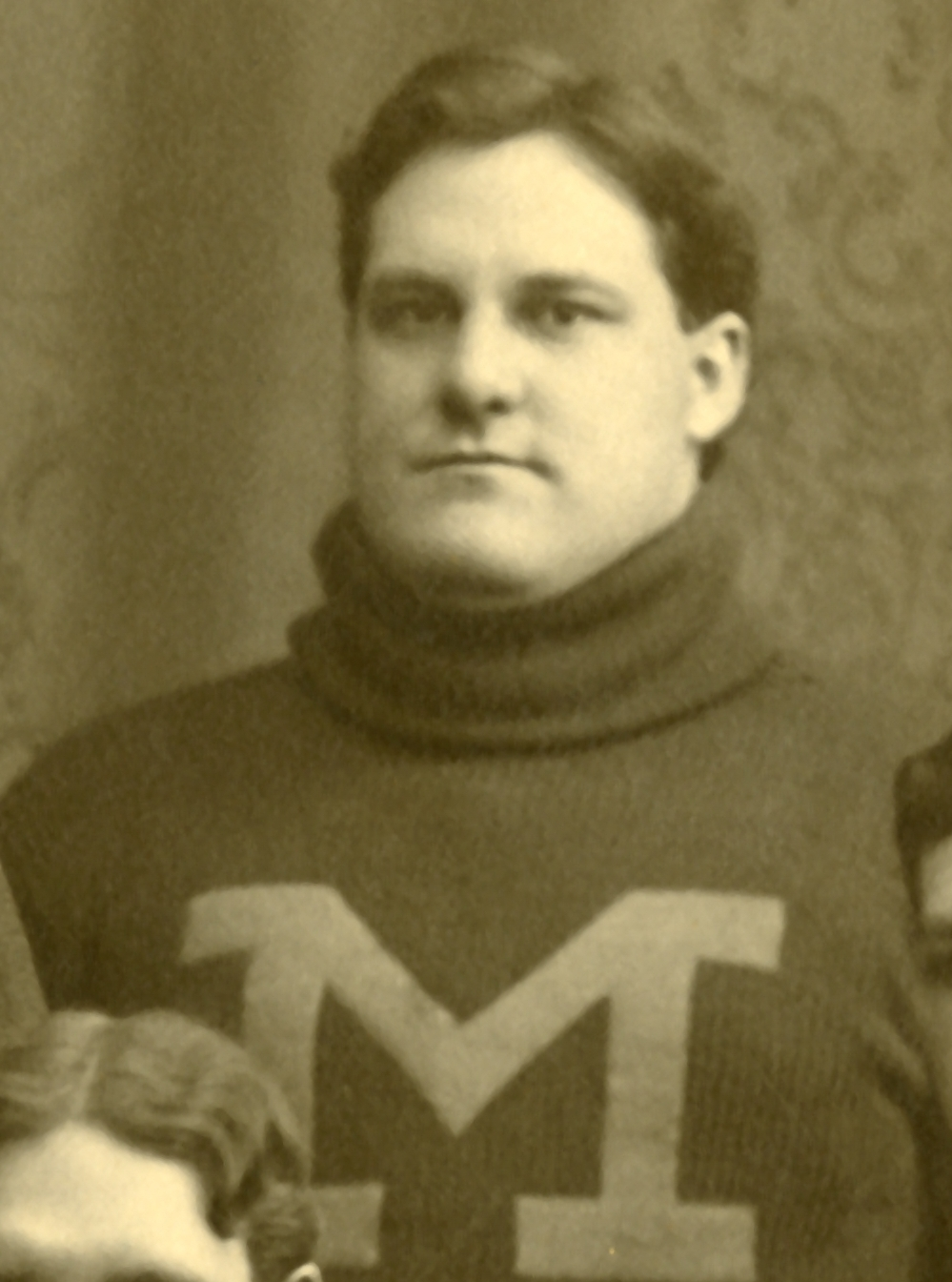
Michigan's first All-American William Cunningham

In 1897, and for the second consecutive year, Stagg's Chicago Maroons defeated a Michigan team that was undefeated up until the last game of the season. The 1897 team compiled a 6–0–1 record before losing to the Maroons on Thanksgiving Day.

Michigan turned the tables on Stagg's Maroons in 1898. With Gustave Ferbert in his second year as head coach, the team compiled an undefeated 10–0 record and outscored its opponents 205 to 26. The 1898 Wolverines shut out a total of six opponents, including Michigan Agricultural (39–0) and Notre Dame (23–0).

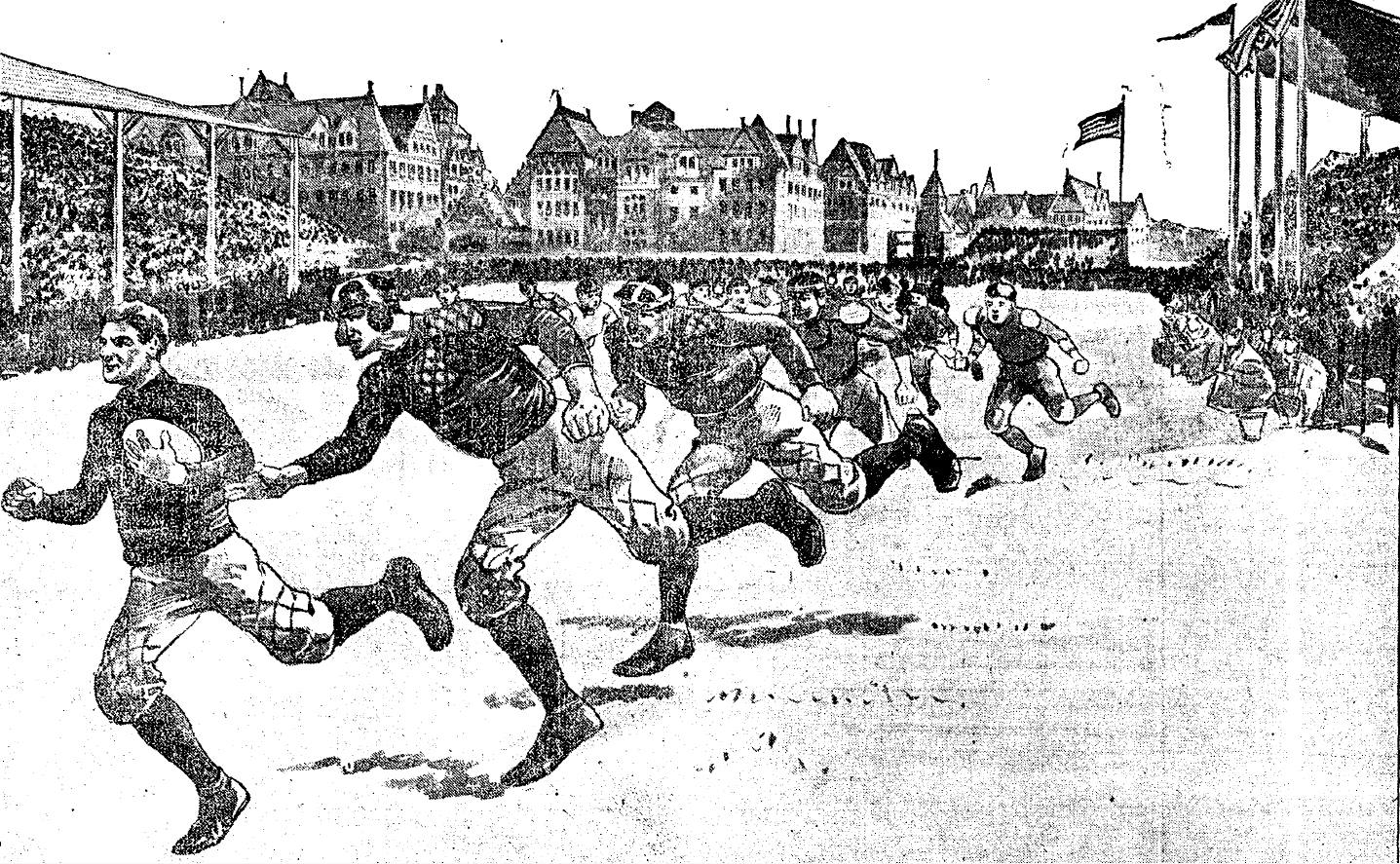
"[Charles] Widman of Michigan, Pursued by Chicago Players, Runs for Glory and a Touchdown"

Michigan concluded its undefeated 1898 season on Thanksgiving Day with a 12–11 victory over Chicago at Marshall Field. The Michigan Central Railroad arranged for two special trains to run from Ann Arbor to Chicago, and a crowd of 12,000 spectators attended the game. Charles Widman scored two touchdowns for Michigan, and his second touchdown run covered 65 yards on a "delayed pass." The Chicago Daily Tribune wrote:

Widman scurried out of the back of the mass of players with the ball under his arm and down the field with nothing in sight ahead of him except the goal posts. All the fast men of the Chicago team went in fast pursuit. It was a beautiful race down the field. Three Chicago men were close behind. But the blue-legged runner gained almost imperceptibly at times, and then barely held his own.

The Wolverines clung to the lead and became champions of the Western Conference for the first time in the school's history. Chicago coach Amos Alonzo Stagg said: "It was perhaps the finest game of football ever played in the West. It certainly was spectacular and full of features."

In Ann Arbor, 1,000 students gathered at the Athens Theater in Ann Arbor where they listened to a play-by-play account of the Chicago game as it was transmitted by telegraph. Michigan gains were met with cheering. When Widman's touchdown run was announced, "It seemed as if the whole assembly was thrown into the air by a volcanic eruption. Men threw their hats and coats at one another and hugged and danced in the aisles for fully ten minutes." After the game, the crowd marched through the streets to President James B. Angell's home. President Angell spoke to the crowd, expressing support for the team and gratitude "to the men who have won the laurels of our victory from the brow of our sister institution of higher learning."

After the 1898 season, center William Cunningham was selected as a first-team All-American by Caspar Whitney in Harper's Weekly – the first Michigan football player to receive first-team All-American honors.

=== Ferbert leaves for Alaska ===
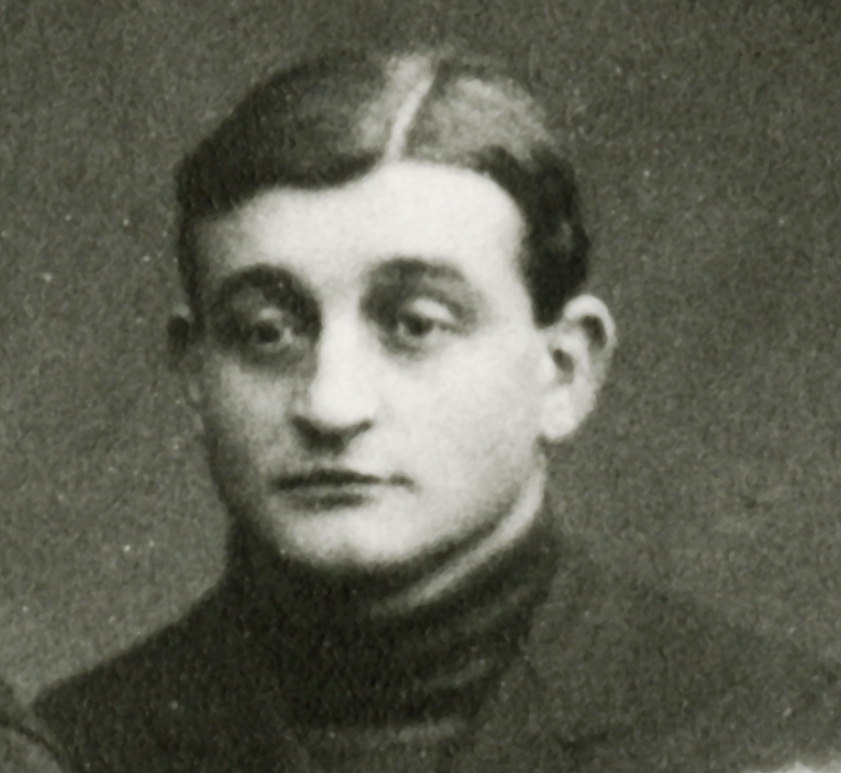
Gustave Ferbert in 1898

In 1899, Michigan was in its third year under head coach Gustave Ferbert. Ferbert had been a star halfback at Michigan from 1893 to 1896. During the four years Ferbert played, the Michigan team compiled a record of 33–4–1. In 1897, Ferbert took over as head coach and led the team for three years, compiling a record of 24–3–1, including a 16-game winning streak from 1898 to 1899.

In May 1900, newspapers reported that Ferbert had left Ann Arbor for Seattle, where he planned to join two of his former Michigan teammates, to prospect for gold in Alaska. For a considerable period of time, Ferbert was out of contact. In 1909, he returned from Alaska as a millionaire. One article reported on Ferbert's $1,000,000 "Touchdown in the Arctic."

Ferbert's abrupt departure in May 1900 left Michigan without a head football coach. The Wolverines looked east, hiring Langdon Lea, a four-time All-American from Princeton who was later inducted into the College Football Hall of Fame. The team opened the 1900 season with six wins, but went 1–2–1 in the final four games, including a scoreless tie against Ohio State and losses to Iowa (28–5) and Chicago (15–6). After the 1900 season, Lea returned to Princeton, and Michigan replaced him with a new coach, Fielding H. Yost.

== Notable games ==
Game	Home	Visitor	Location	Final score	Notes
1879 Racine	Michigan	Racine College	Chicago, Illinois	1-0	On May 30, 1879, Michigan played its first intercollegiate football game against Racine College at White Stocking Park in Chicago. The Chicago Tribune called it "the first rugby-football game to be played west of the Alleghenies." Midway through "the first 'inning'," Irving Kane Pond scored the first touchdown for Michigan. According to Will Perry's history of Michigan football, the crowd responded to Pond's plays with cheers of "Pond Forever."
1880 Toronto	Michigan	Toronto	Toronto, Ontario	1-0	Possibly the first college football game played outside the United States.
1881 Harvard	Michigan	Harvard	Cambridge, Massachusetts	4-0	The first game between "western" and "eastern" teams marked the birth of intersectional football. Western teams, including Michigan, played a more traditional form of rugby, while eastern teams played a more stylized predecessor to American football. In its report on the game, The Boston Journal wrote: "The Western college boys have long wished a chance to try their powers with Eastern opponents . . . As it was, Harvard won more by luck than by superiority in strength or skill . . ."
1883 Detroit Independents	Michigan	Detroit Independents	Ann Arbor, Michigan	40-5	The first game played by the Wolverines in Ann Arbor. The game was played at the Ann Arbor Fairgrounds.
1885 Penninsulars	Penninsulars	Michigan	Detroit, Michigan	42-0	The first Thanksgiving Day football game in Detroit (a tradition later revived by the Detroit Lions). Michigan made it a tradition to play annual Thanksgiving games, holding 19 such games from 1885 to 1905. The Thanksgiving Day games between Michigan and the Chicago Maroons in the 1890s have been cited as "The Beginning of Thanksgiving Day Football." In fact, Yale and Princeton began an annual tradition of playing against each other on Thanksgiving Day starting in 1876.
1887 Notre Dame	Notre Dame	Michigan	South Bend, Indiana	8-0	The first game in the Michigan–Notre Dame football rivalry. Players from the Michigan came to Notre Dame to teach them football, and Notre Dame established its first team. In their first game, Notre Dame suffered a decisive loss as each point was both a touchdown and a field goal. Michigan now holds the #1 and Notre Dame the #2 position for winningest programs in college football.
1890 Albion	Michigan	Albion College	Ann Arbor, Michigan	56-10	Michigan's first racially integrated football game. Fullback George Jewett became the first African-American to play football at Michigan. After the game, The Chronicle-Argonaut wrote, "Jewett, '94, showed up in good form though his work was not entirely perfect." Jewett was called "the Afro-American phenomenon of the University of Michigan." John Heisman described Jewett as a "superior athlete," and Amos Alonzo Stagg referred to him as "a very tough opponent."
1894 Cornell	Michigan	Cornell	Detroit, Michigan	12-4	The "first time in collegiate football history that a western school defeated an established power from the east." (Teams from the Ivy League were recognized as the national champions every year from 1869 to 1900.) Two-thousand students traveled to Detroit for the game, and Michigan players paraded down Woodward Avenue. After the game, "the Michigan men went wild" as blue and yellow were "all the colors that could be seen." An Indiana newspaper called it "the fiercest struggle at football that ever took place on Michigan soil" and opined that "the victory places Michigan in the position of worthy foeman of Yale, Harvard, Princeton or Pennsylvania."
1895 Chicago	Chicago	Michigan	Chicago, Illinois	12-0	With a victory over Chicago, the 1895 team "clinched their claim to the Western championship." After the game, a Chicago newspaper wrote: "The Michigan team is the finest set of football players Ann Arbor has ever sent out and completely out-classes any team in the West. . . . [T]he local team appeared like school-boys before them. It seemed almost wonderful that these giants could be kept from sweeping down the field and scoring as they willed."
1896 Chicago	Chicago	Michigan	Chicago, Illinois	7-6	The first college football game played indoors occurred at the Chicago Coliseum on Thanksgiving Day with the added novelty of a field lit with electric lighting. After the game, a Chicago newspaper proclaimed "indoor football is literally and figuratively speaking a howling success," noting that the game had been played "on its merits, without the handicaps of a wet field or a strong wind."
1897 Ohio State	Michigan	Ohio State	Ann Arbor, Michigan	34-0	First meeting in the Michigan–Ohio State football rivalry which is considered by many to be the fiercest in American sports. A newspaper account of the game reported that Michigan's points were scored in the first twenty minutes, "after which the play assumed the form of a practice game," as players were substituted and kicking and defense were the feature for the rest of the game. According to the report, the "Ohio players made no impression on the university of Michigan line."
1898 Chicago	Chicago	Michigan	Chicago, Illinois	12-11	Michigan's Thanksgiving Day victory over Chicago capped a perfect 10-0 season and gave Michigan its first Western Conference (now the Big Ten) championship. After watching the game, Louis Elbel wrote Michigan's fight song "The Victors" celebrating Michigan's first turn as the "Champions of the West."

== Rivalries ==
=== Chicago ===
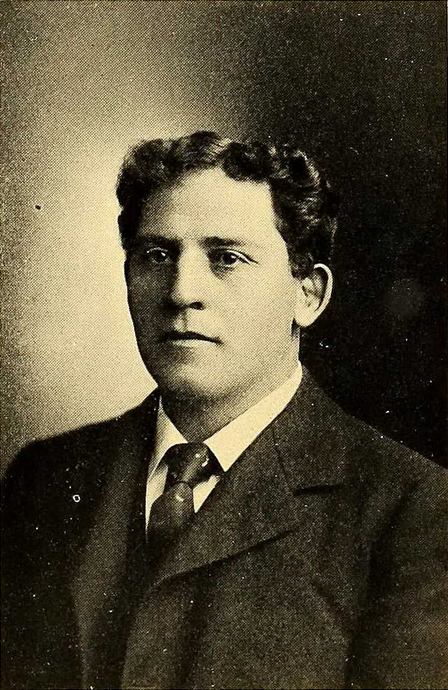
Amos Alonzo Stagg was both the coach and right halfback for Chicago in 1892.

Michigan's principal rivalry during the 1890s was with the University of Chicago Maroons football team. In the first nine games of the series, played from 1892 to 1900, Michigan compiled a record of 5–4.

After Michigan won the first game in 1892, Michigan and Chicago played two games in 1893. Chicago won the first game, 10–6, at the University of Chicago Athletic Grounds on October 21, 1893. The following month, the teams began a tradition of playing the last football game of their seasons against each other on Thanksgiving Day. The 1893 Thanksgiving Day game was played at Marshall Field in Chicago in front of a crowd of 2,000 spectators. Michigan won, 28–10.

The teams played again at Marshall Field on Thanksgiving Day 1894. Despite a "driving sleet storm" that hit two hours before kickoff, the game attracted a crowd of 6,000 spectators. The large attendance solidified Chicago's status as Michigan's "natural rival", and The Michigan Alumnus reported that "all parties hope to make this game the leading athletic event of the west." An account published in the Detroit Free Press described the atmosphere surrounding the game:

Notwithstanding the threatening weather, fully 6,000 of Chicago's best and fairest witnessed the hardest fought battle ever seen in Chicago. . . . The east and south sides of the field were lined with tally-hos, landaus, etc. ... The yellow and blue of Michigan was as prominently displayed as was the maroon of Chicago. Everyone was out to yell for his respective team and from the noise it seemed as if pandemonium had been turned loose.

After the game, Michigan supporters charged that Chicago's coach "Stagg had secured [Michigan]'s signals and made use of the knowledge, hoping to win by any means, however questionable."

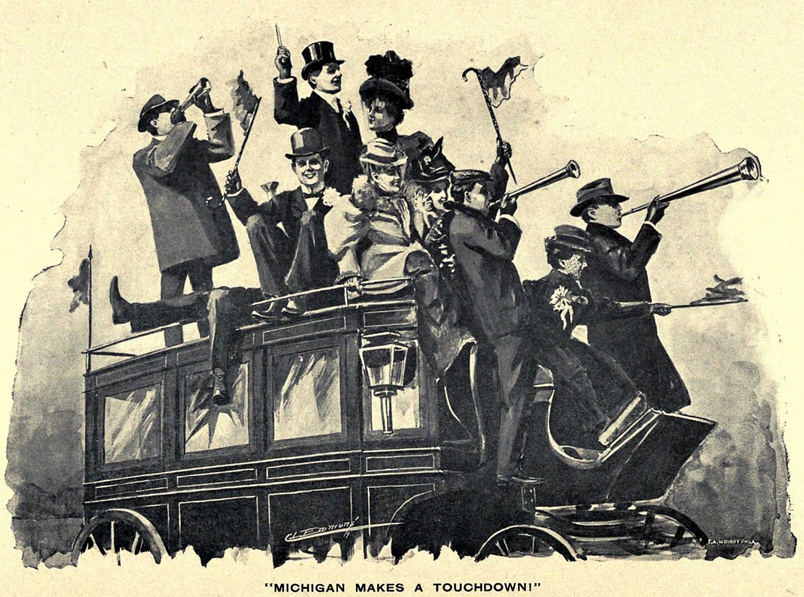
Michigan fans celebrate a touchdown

In 1895, the two teams played for the third consecutive year at Marshall Field on Thanksgiving Day. The game again attracted a large crowd, estimated at more than 6,000 spectators. The running of Michigan's fullback John Bloomingston, a Chicago native, was reportedly the high point of the game. Michigan won, 12–0. Michigan's dominance over Stagg's team led one Chicago newspaper to write: "The Michigan team is the finest set of football players Ann Arbor has ever sent out and completely out-classes any team in the West. ... [T]he local team appeared like school-boys before them. It seemed almost wonderful that these giants could be kept from sweeping down the field and scoring as they willed." The World of New York wrote that the Michigan players had "clinched their claim to the Western championship."

On Thanksgiving Day 1896, Stagg's Maroons defeated Michigan, 7–6, in "the first collegiate game of football played under a roof." In 1897, Michigan and Chicago again played their game on Thanksgiving Day at the Chicago Coliseum. Chicago won the game, 21-12, as Clarence Herschberger kicked three field goals (each worth five points under 1897 rules). Michigan scored two touchdowns, including a 55-yard fumble return by Michigan tackle William F. Baker. However, the touchdowns were not enough to overcome Herschberger's field goals under the 1897 scoring rules.

In 1898, Michigan's victory over Stagg's Maroons established Michigan as Western Conference champions for the first time in the school's history. After not playing against each other in 1899, the teams met again on Thanksgiving Day 1900. Chicago won the 1900 game, 15–6. The game was the last game of the 1900 season and the last game of the pre-Yost era. Fielding H. Yost was hired as Michigan's head football coach before the start of the 1901 season.

=== Michigan State ===
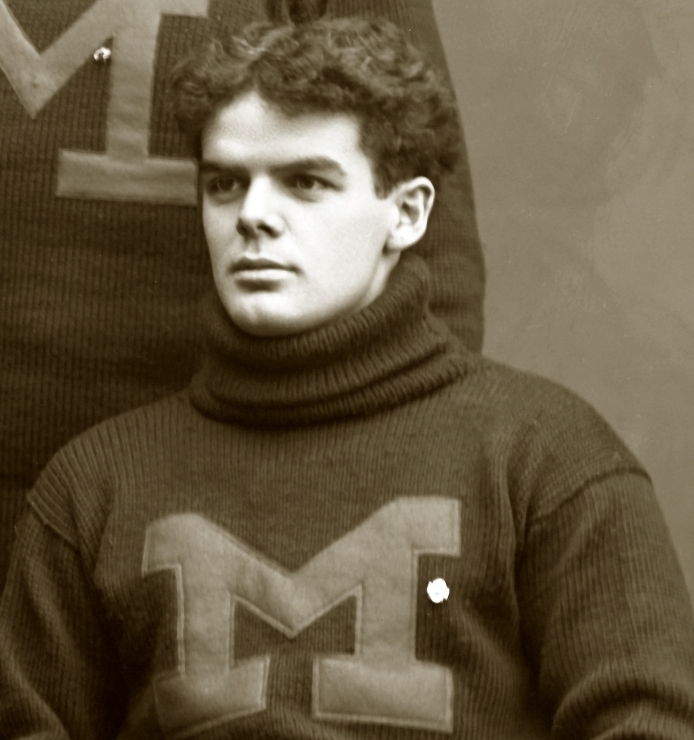
Leo J. Keena became the first Michigan player to kick a field goal from placement against the Michigan Aggies.

The 1898 season marked the first game played in the intrastate rivalry between Michigan and Michigan State (then known as Michigan Agricultural College). The teams met in Ann Arbor on October 12, 1898, and Michigan won, 39–0. The Detroit Free Press wrote that the game was "essentially a practice game", as Michigan played 25 different players during the game. Charles Widman scored two touchdowns and was "the strongest ground-gainer" for Michigan. In the second half, Leo J. Keena also kicked a field goal from a place-kick, "the first time a Michigan eleven has ever scored in that fashion."

After the 1898 shutout, Michigan sent its freshman team against Michigan Agricultural for the next three years. The two rivals have played each other more than 100 times since the inaugural meeting in 1898.

=== Minnesota ===
Although the tradition of the Little Brown Jug was not established until later, Michigan and Minnesota played five football games in the pre-Yost era. Michigan lost the first two games, which were played in 1892 at Minneapolis and in 1893 at Ann Arbor. The Wolverines then won three consecutive game against the Golden Gophers from 1895 through 1897.

=== Ohio State ===
The 1897 season marked the first game in the Michigan-Ohio State rivalry. The two teams met in Ann Arbor on October 16, 1897. Michigan won the game by a score of 34 to 0. A newspaper account reported that Michigan's scoring was made in the first twenty minutes, "after which the play assumed the form of a practice game", as players were substituted and kicking and defense were the feature for the rest of the game. According to the report, the "Ohio players made no impression on the university of Michigan line", as Michigan's varsity "showed up in fine form during the first half, the play being fast and the work steady."

After the 1897 game, the teams did not meet again until 1900. The 1900 game was played in Ann Arbor at Regents Field ended in a scoreless tie. According to a newspaper account, the two teams "struggled for two twenty-five minute halves on a slippery field this afternoon and neither side could score." In the second half, with the wind in Michigan's favor, "Sweeley's kicking gave Michigan an advantage, and the play was entirely in Ohio's territory." Michigan twice drove to Ohio State's 15-yard line by tandem plays and line-bucking, but the Ohio State defense rallied each time to stop the Wolverines. Everett Sweeley and Neil Snow were the stars of the game for Michigan.

=== Notre Dame ===
The first games in the Michigan–Notre Dame football rivalry occurred in November 1887 and April 1888. Michigan won all three games by a combined score of 66–10. After the 1888 games, no Michigan football team returned to play at Notre Dame until 1942. The teams did not face each other at all for a decade. Michigan and Notre Dame resumed their football rivalry in 1898 playing three games between 1898 and 1900. Michigan won all three games by a combined score of 42 to 0.

== Venues ==
- Regents Field – The home field for Michigan football team from 1893 to 1905. It was located along South State Street in Ann Arbor, Michigan, where Schembechler Hall stands today.
- Washtenaw County Fairgrounds – The first home field for the Michigan football team. The Wolverines played their home games at the Fairgrounds from 1883 to 1884 and again from 1886 to 1892. The first intercollegiate football game played at the Fairgrounds was a May 12, 1883, game between Michigan and the Detroit Independents. The game was part of a "field day" with events that included track-and-field events, wrestling, boxing, lawn tennis, chasing a greased pig, and other competitions.

== Culture and lore ==
=== Fight songs ===
The songs most associated with the Michigan football team in the 1890s were the alma mater, "The Yellow and Blue" (with lyrics by Charles Mills Gayley) and a version of the popular ragtime song, "There'll Be a Hot Time in the Old Town Tonight" with special Michigan lyrics. The latter was considered to be Michigan's school song during the 1890s and early 1900s.

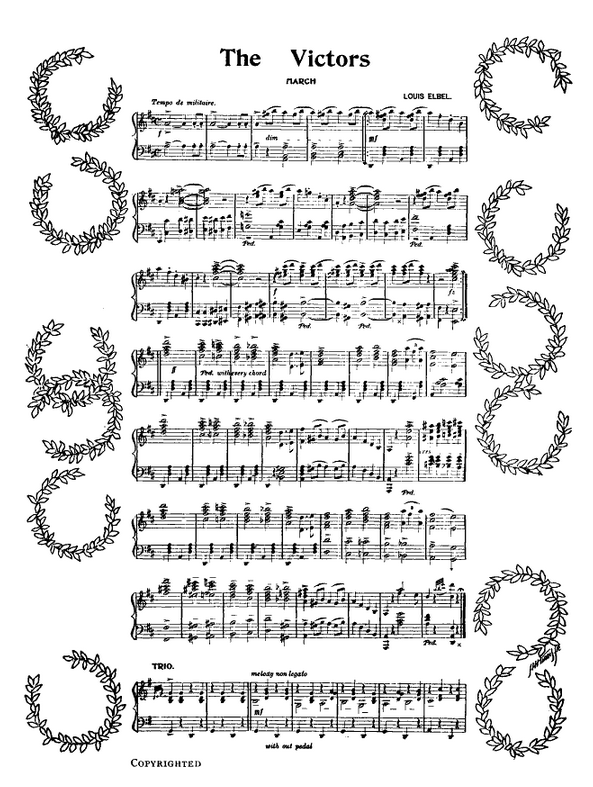
Elbel's "The Victors March" published in the 1899 Michiganensian

The current fight song, "The Victors", was composed by Louis Elbel, a student at the University of Michigan's School of Music, after watching Michigan's 12–11 victory over Chicago in 1898. Elbel began composing the song at his sister's house in the Englewood section of Chicago and continued the effort on the return train ride from Chicago to Ann Arbor. Elbel's lyric, "Champions of the West", refers to Michigan's having won the Western Conference championship for the first time in the school's history. Elbel later recalled:

We were crazed with joy. We paraded in the dark. We yelled and followed our U-M Band, singing to the tune of 'Hot Time in the Old Town.' It struck me quite suddenly that such an epic should be dignified by something more elevating, for this was not ordinary victory. My spirits were so uplifted that I was clear off the earth, and that is when 'The Victors' was inspired. I put in a lot of 'hails' and I knew the fellows would get them in with the proper emphasis. Through them, the title suggested itself, and I dedicated it to the Michigan team of 1898.

Elbel's march, originally known as "The Victor's March", debuted in the spring of 1899. On April 8, 1899, John Philip Sousa gave a concert at University Hall and performed a rendition of Elbel's new song. In May 1899, The Michigan Alumnus published an article touting the song:

THE NEW MICHIGAN MARCH

Louis Elbel, who is making a wide reputation as a clever musician and composer, has just published a new piece entitled The Victor's March. It is dedicated to the foot-ball team of '98, and is unusually stirring. Sousa played it at his recent concert here, and it has been performed on several other occasions. The following loyal words go with the music, and Ann Arbor is ringing with them: 'Hail to the victors valiant, Hail to the conquering heroes, Hail, hail to Michigan, The champions of the West.'

=== Michigan Marching Band ===
In describing his inspiration for "The Victors", Louis Elbel recalled following the band as it marched through Chicago. The history of the Michigan Marching Band began two years earlier in November 1896 when Harry dePont held a meeting of musicians to form a University band. Almost 30 musicians answered the call. The band played at the university's 1897 commencement ceremony and made a favorable impression.

The band's tradition of playing at Michigan football games began during the 1897 season. In November 1897, The Michigan Alumnus reported: "The University Band, which made such a hit last spring, has again organized. It plays at all the big football games and mass meetings." In October 1898, the same publication noted that the band had led a procession up Jefferson and Woodward Avenues when the football team played a game in Detroit in 1897. In November 1898, the band was sent to Chicago with new uniforms. The Michigan Alumnus observed: "They are fast becoming a necessary part of every university affair." In November 1899, when Michigan played against Virginia in Detroit, the band accompanied the football team and "several hundred students" on a special Michigan Central train. Upon arriving in Detroit, the team and students "with the band at the head, marched in double column to the Russell House, which for a number of years has always been athletic headquarters."

=== The "Azure Blue and Maize" ===
In 1867, a committee consisting of three students was appointed by the University of Michigan's literary department to select colors for the university. At a meeting in the College Chapel on February 12, 1867, the committee made the following report:

Your committee, appointed to select emblematic colors for our University, unanimously agree in presenting as their choice, Azure Blue and Maize, and recommend that the following resolution be adopted: 'Resolved, that Azure Blue and Maize be adopted as the emblematic colors of the University of Michigan.'

The resolution was adopted.

=== Professor Pattengill ===
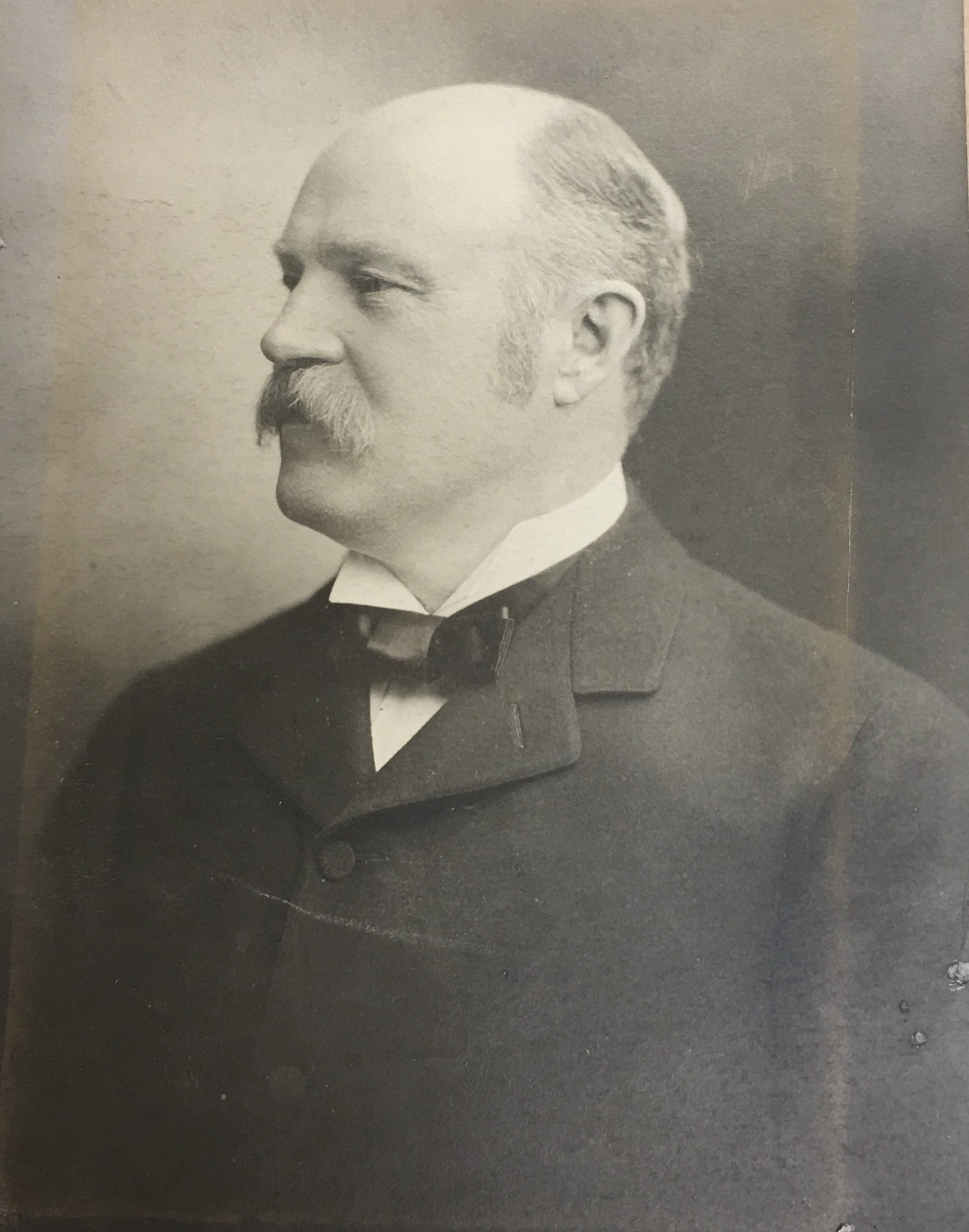
Professor Albert Pattengill

The three-person committee that selected the university colors in 1867 included Albert Pattengill, then an outfielder on the 1867 Michigan baseball team. Pattengill remained at the University of Michigan after receiving his degree and served for many years as a professor of Greek and French languages.

Pattengill was also an important leader in the development of Michigan's athletic program. In 1894, with the growing popularity of intercollegiate athletics, Michigan's faculty established a faculty Board in Control of Athletics. Pattengill was a member of the Athletic Board from the time of its formation. serving as its chairman from 1898 until the time of his death in 1906. He was also one of the leaders in the formation in 1896 of the Western Inter-Collegiate Athletic Conference (later known as the Big Ten Conference). The conference was composed of representatives from the athletic boards of seven leading Mid-Western universities, established with the goal of regulating and standardizing the conditions of inter-collegiate athletics and "to maintain a high ideal of amateurism in college sports." Professor Pattengill worked with Michigan's President James Burrill Angell on the formation of the conference and served as Michigan's faculty representative to the conference. He also served as Chairman of the Western Conference for a number of years.

In 1900 and 1904, Pattengill led the effort to send Michigan's best athletes to the Summer Olympic Games. Michigan's John McLean won a silver medal in the high hurdles at the 1900 Paris games, and Michigan athletes won nine medals, including six gold medals, at the 1904 St. Louis games.

The 1906 University of Michigan yearbook, the Michiganensian, credited Pattengill's "untiring energy to the betterment of athletic conditions" and opined that "the influence of his character" on the university's destiny was undying. The Michigan Alumnus called him "A Modern Greek" and added: "[C]ould anything be in more harmony with the finest traditions of Greek culture than Professor Pattengill's efforts for the establishment of collegiate and intercollegiate athletics on a high plane of sportsmanship and essential manliness? He was a tower of strength through the earlier days of Michigan's athletic history; to him, more than to any other one man, must be ascribed the inception and success of the Western Conference." In his 1920 history of the university, Wilfred Byron Shaw called Pattengill "the moving spirit in the [Western] Conference through many years; and to him, more than to any other, Michigan owes, not only the present effective organization of athletics, but the securing of Ferry Field and its equipment."

== Coaching staff and administration ==
=== Head coaching records ===
Name	Term	GC	W	L	T	%
No coaches	1879–1890	34	23	10	1	.691
Frank Crawford, Mike Murphy	1891	9	4	5	0	.444
Frank Barbour	1892–1893	22	14	8	0	.636
William McCauley	1894–1895	20	17	2	1	.875
William Ward	1896	10	9	1	0	.900
Gustave Ferbert	1897–1899	28	24	3	1	.875
Langdon Lea	1900	10	7	2	1	.750

=== Assistant coaches ===
- James Baird – player, 1892–1895; assistant coach, 1897–1898
- Ignatius M. Duffy – player, 1896; assistant coach, 1897 (head coach at Alma, 1895)
- James Duffy – player, 1885–1891; coach, 1891
- John Duffy – player, 1884–1887; assistant coach, 1898–1899
- Thad S. Farnham – player, 1894–1896; assistant coach, 1897
- Raynor S. Freund – player, 1892–1895; assistant coach, 1897
- H. G. Hadden – player, 1893–1894; assistant coach, 1899 (head coach at Notre Dame in 1895)
- Forrest M. Hall – player, 1895; assistant coach, 1898 and 1909 (head coach at Auburn in 1894)
- Frederick W. Henninger – player, 1893–1896; assistant coach, 1897–1899 and 1902
- William C. Malley – player 1888–1890; assistant coach, 1897–1898 (head coach at Wabash in 1892)
- William McCauley – assistant coach, 1896 (head coach, 1894–1895)
- Horace Greely Prettyman – player, 1892–1890; coach, 1891
- Archibald Stevenson – assistant coach, 1897 (played for Purdue, 1889–1892)
- Giovanni Villa – player, 1893–1896; assistant coach, 1897–1898

=== Others ===
- James Burrill Angell – President of the University of Michigan, 1871–1909.
- Charles A. Baird – athletic director, 1898–1909
- Keene Fitzpatrick – trainer, 1894–1895, 1898–1910 (also Michigan's track coach, 1900–1910)
- Edward Moulton – trainer, 1893
- Albert Pattengill – founding member of the University of Michigan Board in Control of Athletics; first faculty representative to the Western Conference

== Players ==
Name	Start Year	Last Year	Position(s)	Notes
Howard Abbott	1889	1890	Quarterback	Captain and quarterback of first Minnesota football team in 1886; played for Michigan as a law student
Frank Gates Allen	1879	1880	Forward	Later became president of the Moline Plow Company and president of the Moline State Trust & Savings Bank
William Allen	1898	1898	Guard	Served as head football coach, Washington State, 1900, 1902
James Baird	1892	1895	Quarterback	Directed the construction of the Flatiron Building, Lincoln Memorial, Arlington Memorial Amphitheater, and Tomb of the Unknown Soldier
Edmond H. Barmore	1879	1880	Halfback, quarterback	Later became a steamship builder and founder of the Los Angeles Transfer Co.
Elmer Beach	1882	1883	Quarterback	Founder of the Beach & Beach law firm in Chicago; brother of novelist Rex Beach
John W. F. Bennett	1896	1898	Guard, end	Supervised construction of Algonquin Hotel in New York and the Ritz and Waldorf Hotels in London
John A. Bloomingston	1894	1895	Fullback	Leading scorer on the 1895 team that won Michigan's first Western football championship
William Caley	1896	1898	Guard, halfback, fullback	Also played at Colorado, 1893–1895
Charles H. Campbell	1879	1879	Halfback	Became a prominent Detroit lawyer and president of the Detroit Board of Commerce
Martin H. Carmody	1899	1899	Guard	Served as the Supreme Knight of the Knights of Columbus from 1927 to 1939
Bert Carr	1894	1896	Guard, center	Selected in 1896 by the Chicago Tribune as "the best center in the West"; named the greatest guard in Michigan history in 1902
Thomas Chadbourne	1890	1890	Center	Founded the New York law firm Chadbourne & Parke
John Chase	1879	1880	Rusher, forward	Commander of the Colorado National Guard in confrontations with organized labor, including the Colorado Labor Wars of 1903–1904 and Ludlow Massacre of 1914
Frank Crawford	1891	1901		Crawford was both the unpaid head coach and a substitute player for the 1891 team
William Cunningham	1897	1899	Center	Michigan's first All-American football player
Edwin Denby	1895	1895	Center	U.S. Congressman from Michigan 1905–1911; Served as Secretary of the Navy 1921–1924; played role in the Teapot Dome scandal
Thomas Jesse Drumheller	1896	1896	Quarterback	Later became a leading sheep rancher in Walla Walla, Washington
William J. Duff	1882	1884	Halfback	Later a leading medical doctor in Port Huron, Michigan; served in the Spanish–American War
Ignatius M. Duffy	1896	1896	Fullback	
James E. Duffy	1885	1891	Halfback	Captain of the 1888 team; Set world record in 1886 by drop kicking a football 168 feet, 7-1/2 inches; later became an attorney and member of the UM Board in Control of Athletics
George Dygert	1890	1894	Fullback, halfback	
Royal T. Farrand	1887	1887	Quarterback	Quarterback in 1887 and manager in 1891; hired Michigan's football coach in 1891
Gustave Ferbert	1893	1896	Halfback, end	Michigan's head football coach 1897–1899; became rich in the Yukon Gold Rush
Forest Firestone	1896	1897	Reserve	Head football coach at Buchtel College, now the University of Akron, for one season in 1902
Richard France	1898	1899	Guard	First-team All-American 1899
George Greenleaf	1893	1896	Quarterback, end	Later coached the 1899 Miami football team and became a medical doctor
H. G. Hadden	1894	1894	Tackle	Transferred and served as player and coach of the 1895 Notre Dame team
William W. Hannan	1879	1879	Rusher	Played for the first Michigan football team; became the leading real estate developer in Detroit in the late 19th century
Frederick W. Henninger	1893	1896	Tackle, guard	Later served as an assistant football coach at Michigan before successful career in manufacturing
Albert E. Herrnstein	1899	1902	Halfback, end	Scored 6 touchdowns against Ohio State in 1902; Played on "Point-a-Minute" teams; Later served as head football coach at Haskell, Purdue and Ohio State
Frank G. Higgins	1885	1885	Forward	First native-born person from Montana admitted to the state's bar and to serve in its legislature; Lieutenant Governor of Montana, 1901–05
George S. Holden	1890	1890	Quarterback	
John W. Hollister	1893	1895	Halfback	Later served as head football coach at Mississippi, Beloit College and Morningside College
Walter S. Horton	1881	1881	Quarterback	The second Michigan player at the quarterback position; practiced law in Illinois for 50 years
Albert W. Jefferis	1891	1891	Center	Later served in the U.S. Congress from Nebraska
George Jewett	1890	1892	Fullback, halfback, place kicker	First African-American football player at both Michigan and Northwestern; one of the greatest players in the pre-Yost era
Collins H. Johnston	1879	1880	Halfback	Became a medical doctor, surgeon, and civic leader in Grand Rapids, Michigan
Leo J. Keena	1897	1899	Fullback	Later served as U.S. General Consul in Paris and Warsaw and as U.S. Ambassador to Honduras and South Africa
Henry Killilea	1883	1884	Center, forward	One of the five men, along with Connie Mack, Charles Comiskey and Ban Johnson, who founded baseball's American League in 1899; owner of the Milwaukee Brewers (which became the Baltimore Orioles) and Boston Red Sox
William Harrison Mace	1882	1882	Rusher	Later became renowned professor of American history and biographer of Abraham Lincoln
William C. Malley	1888	1890	Tackle, guard	
John McLean	1897	1899	Halfback	All-American 1899; Won the silver medal in the 110 metre hurdles at the 1900 Summer Olympics in Paris; Head football coach at Knox and Missouri
Thomas H. McNeil	1884	1885	Quarterback	Later became a lawyer in Missouri
Charles S. Mitchell	1879	1879	Goalkeeper	He was the founder of the Athletic Association; later served as editor of several newspapers in Minnesota and of the Washington Herald
Bill Morley	1895	1895	Quarterback	Went on to receive All-America honors in 1900 and 1901 as a player for Columbia; later inducted into College Football Hall of Fame
William M. Morrow	1885	1886	Forward, quarterback	Served more than 40 years in the U.S. Army, reaching rank of Brigadier General; decorated for bravery in World War I
William J. Olcott	1881	1883	Three-quarter back	Captain of 1882 and 1883 teams; later became president of a railway and a mining company
Irving Kane Pond	1879	1879	Rusher	Scored first touchdown in Michigan history, May 1879; became famous as an architect in the Arts and Crafts movement; three of his buildings are National Historic Landmarks
Horace Greely Prettyman	1882	1890		Holds record for most years playing for Michigan's football team (8); Scored the first touchdown in the first game played at Michigan's first home football field in Ann Arbor; later operated a boarding house, power company and Ann Arbor Press; held office as Ann Arbor city councilman, postmaster and Washtenaw County supervisor
Curtis Redden	1900	1903	End	Died while serving in Germany during World War I
Arthur Redner	1900	1901	Halfback	Last-surviving member of Yost's 1901 Point-a-Minute team
John W. Reynolds, Sr.	1893	1893	Substitute	Later served as Attorney General of Wisconsin; his son became Governor of Wisconsin
J. De Forest Richards	1894	1897	Halfback, quarterback	Son of the Governor of Wyoming; later became a bank president in Chicago
Henry M. Senter	1893	1896	End	Captain of the 1896 team
Walter W. Shaw	1899	1901	Quarterback, halfback	
Roger Sherman	1890	1893	Quarterback, End	Head football coach at Iowa, 1894
Bruce Shorts	1900	1901	Tackle	
Charles H. Smith	1893	1894	Line	Omission as an All-American led to criticism that selectors were biased against Western players
Frederic L. Smith	1888	1888	Quarterback	Later became a founder of the Olds Motor Works and General Motors and president of the Association of Licensed Automobile Manufacturers
Neil Snow	1898	1901	End	All-American 1901; College Football Hall of Fame
Benjamin H. Southworth	1900	1901	Guard, center	Later became a physician and surgeon in Kalamazoo
Ernest Sprague	1886	1887	Guard, rusher	Later gained renown as a contract engineer for the American Bridge Company and Bethlehem Steel
Allen Steckle	1897	1899	Tackle	Later served as the head football coach at Nevada and Oregon State
Everett Sweeley	1899	1902	End, fullback	
Clayton Teetzel	1897	1899	Halfback, end	Coached at Michigan State, BYU and Utah State
Charles Thomas	1891	1892	Guard	Later coached at Nebraska and Arkansas
Fred Townsend	1887	1887	Tackle	Later served as an Iowa state senator and chairman of the Iowa Democratic Party state committee
Virgil Tupper	1891	1892	Guard	
James Van Inwagen	1888	1891	Halfback, fullback, end	Captain of the 1891 Michigan team; Played at end in 1888, fullback in 1889 and halfback in 1891
Giovanni Raphael Frank "Count" Villa	1893	1896	Tackle	Star for Michigan teams that went 33-6-1 from 1893–1896; Assistant football coach 1897–1898
Alanson Weeks	1898	1898	Fullback	Fullback for the 1898 championship team; Later worked as a surgeon in San Francisco; decorated for service as a surgeon at the front in World War I
Boss Weeks	1900	1902	Quarterback	Quarterback of the 1901 "Point-a-Minute" team; Later served as a head football coach at Kansas and Beloit
Hugh White	1898	1901	Tackle, end	Captain of the 1901 "Point-a-Minute" team
Charles Widman	1898	1898	Halfback	Leading scorer on undefeated 1898 team
Ebin Wilson	1899	1901	Guard	Played on the 1901 Point-a-Minute team; Later served as head football coach at Wabash and Alma Colleges
John Wombacher	1895	1896	Center	Elected captain of the 1897 team but unable to play after contracting typhoid fever
