= Moline Plows =

Moline Plows may refer to:

- Moline Plow Company
- Moline Plowboys, minor-league baseball team
