= Frank Gates Allen =

American football player and businessman (1858–1940)

- Born: February 14, 1858
- Died: August 30, 1940 (aged 82); Moline, Illinois
- Citizenship: United States
- Education: University of Michigan
- Known for: Football player, manufacturer, banker

Frank Gates Allen (February 14, 1858 – August 30, 1940) was an American football player and businessman. He played for the first college football team at the University of Michigan and was a forward on the 1879 and 1880 Michigan Wolverines football teams.

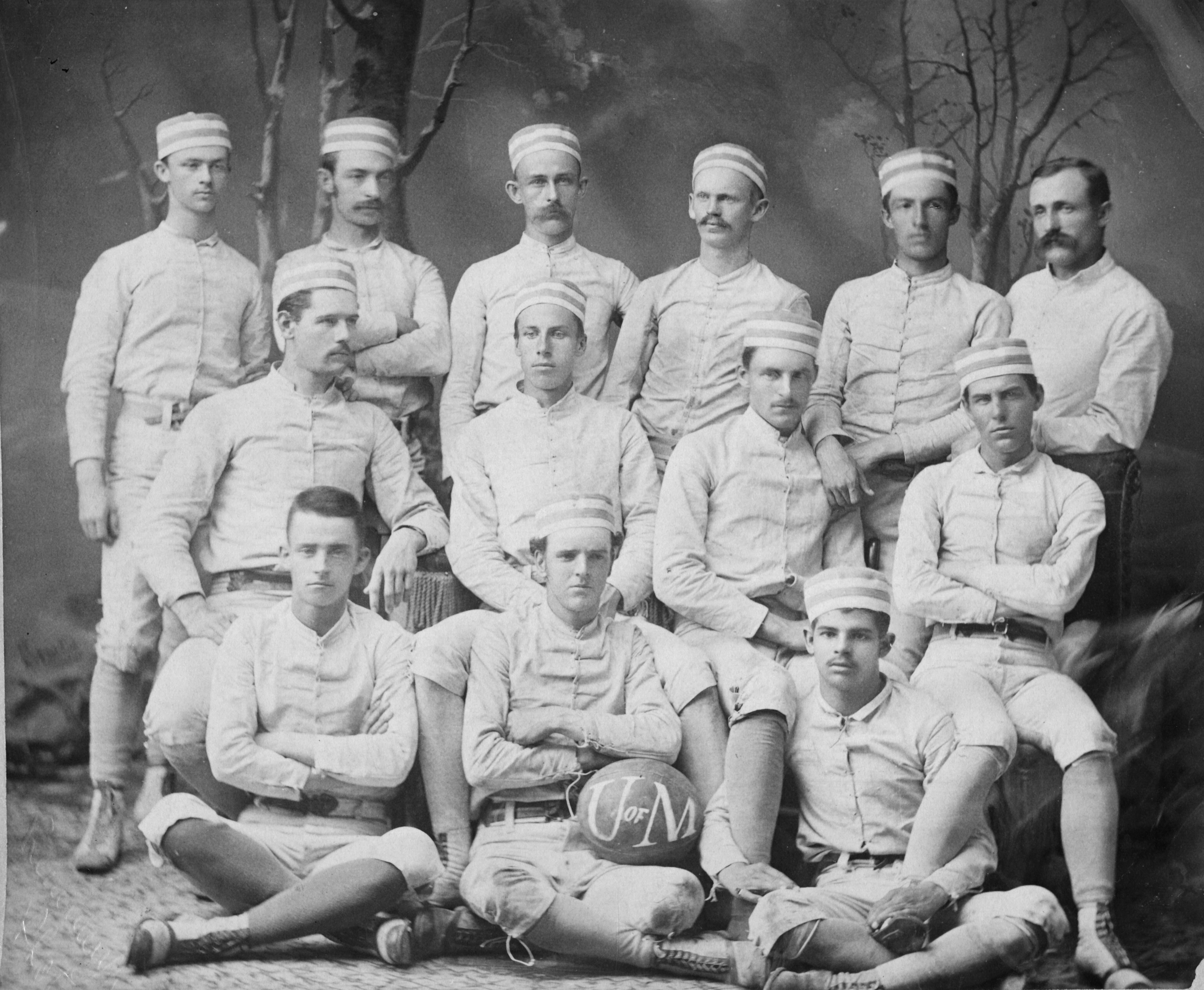
1879 Michigan football team

After graduating from Michigan, Allen moved to Moline, Illinois, in 1881. In June of the following year, he married Minnie Florence Stephens, a daughter of Moline Plow Company president, George W. Stephens. He organized the Moline-Milburn & Stoddard Co. in 1886 with brother-in-law George Arthur Stephens, but he left the company two years later to study law. In 1893, he became the secretary for the Moline Plow Company, and after the death of George W. Stephens in 1902 he was elected vice-president of the company. He was also president of the Moline State Trust and Savings Bank. After retiring as the bank president, he remained chairman of the board. He was also a 33rd degree Mason. In 1918, the Willys-Overland Co. purchased a majority interest in the Moline Plow Company, but Allen remained the vice-president of the company.

His daughter, Marjorie Allen Seiffert, was a nationally-known poet. In the 1930s, Allen donated his home in Moline, valued at $200,000, to the Moline Board of Education. Allen died of heart disease at his daughter's home in Moline in August 1940.

== See also ==
- 1879 Michigan Wolverines football team
- 1880 Michigan Wolverines football team
