= Against Malaria Foundation =

United Kingdom-based charity

- Founded: August 2004; 22 years ago
- Founder: Rob Mather
- Purpose: Preventing malaria
- Region served: Sub-Saharan Africa, Papua New Guinea
- Website: www.againstmalaria.com

The Against Malaria Foundation (AMF) is a UK-based charity that provides long-lasting insecticidal nets to populations at high risk of malaria, primarily in Africa. The foundation has distributed more than 200 million nets since its creation.

Nets are distributed through partnerships with the International Red Cross, the Malaria Consortium and UNICEF, with partners responsible for the costs of distribution. Distributions include malaria education for the local population, and they are documented through reports, photos, and video. Post-distribution check-ups are conducted by independent survey partners to assess net usage and conditions, typically after 9, 18, 27 and 36 months.

AMF has eight trustees and an advisory committee drawn from malaria experts around the world. The charity is registered in the United Kingdom and governed by the laws of England and Wales. It is also registered in sixteen other countries, including the US, Germany, Canada, Japan, and South Korea. It is named a top charity by GiveWell.

== History ==
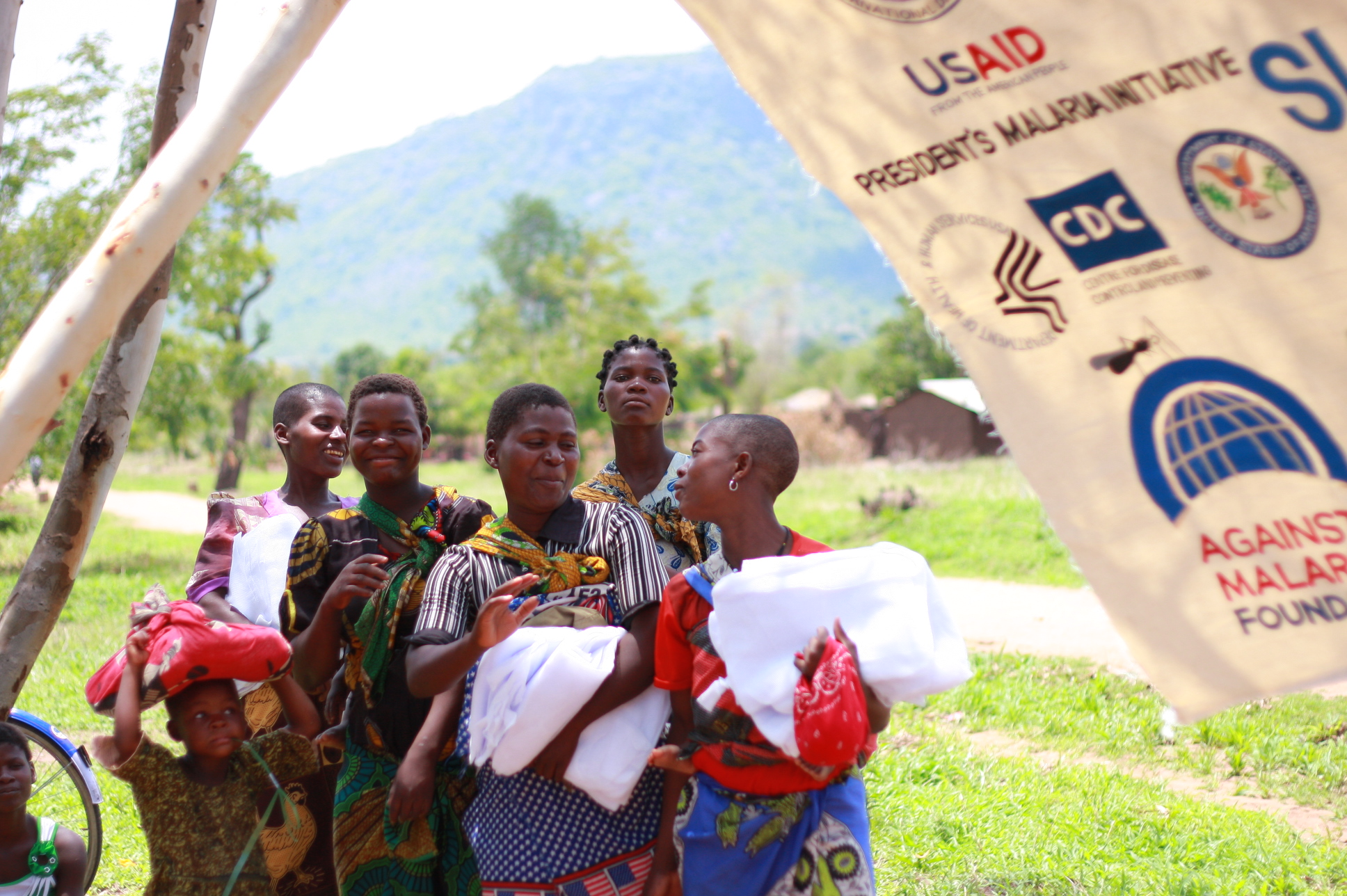
People receiving anti-malarial nets in Malawi

The World Swim Against Malaria was the brainchild of Rob Mather, a London-based strategy consultant. Mather had earlier organized a swim to raise money for a two-year-old girl who was badly burned in a house fire. Held in December 2003, the "Swim for Terri" started as a three-person fundraiser and grew to include 10,000 swimmers in 73 countries.

AMF was founded in 2004 in London. It is rated as a highly cost-effective charity by GiveWell. AMF was chosen as one of GiveWell's two highest-recommended charities (along with the Schistosomiasis Control Initiative) in 2011 and has continued to be recommended by GiveWell since then. GiveWell estimated in 2023 that AMF's bed net program costs on average US$5,500 per life saved.

== Operations ==
Countries served by AMF include Democratic Republic of the Congo, Ghana, Guinea, Malawi, Papua New Guinea, Togo, Uganda, and Zambia. Each net typically costs around US$5 to buy and distribute.

== Partners and supporters ==
AMF is supported by more than 100 corporations. AMF's founding partners are PwC, Citigroup, Speedo, Microsoft, Allen & Overy, Attenda, Vestergaard Frandsen, and Sumitomo Chemical. Speedo also partnered with AMF's precursor organization, World Swim Against Malaria, and continues to raise money for bed nets through swimming events. AMF has also received more than 50 million US dollars from Open Philanthropy.

AMF works with partners such as Concern Universal, IMA World Health, and Episcopal Relief & Development.

In March 2023, AMF reported a milestone of fundraising US$500 million, coming from 919,371 donations from 185,318 people.
