= Against Malaria Foundation Korea =

South Korea-based charity

Against Malaria Foundation Korea (한국말라리아 예방공동체)
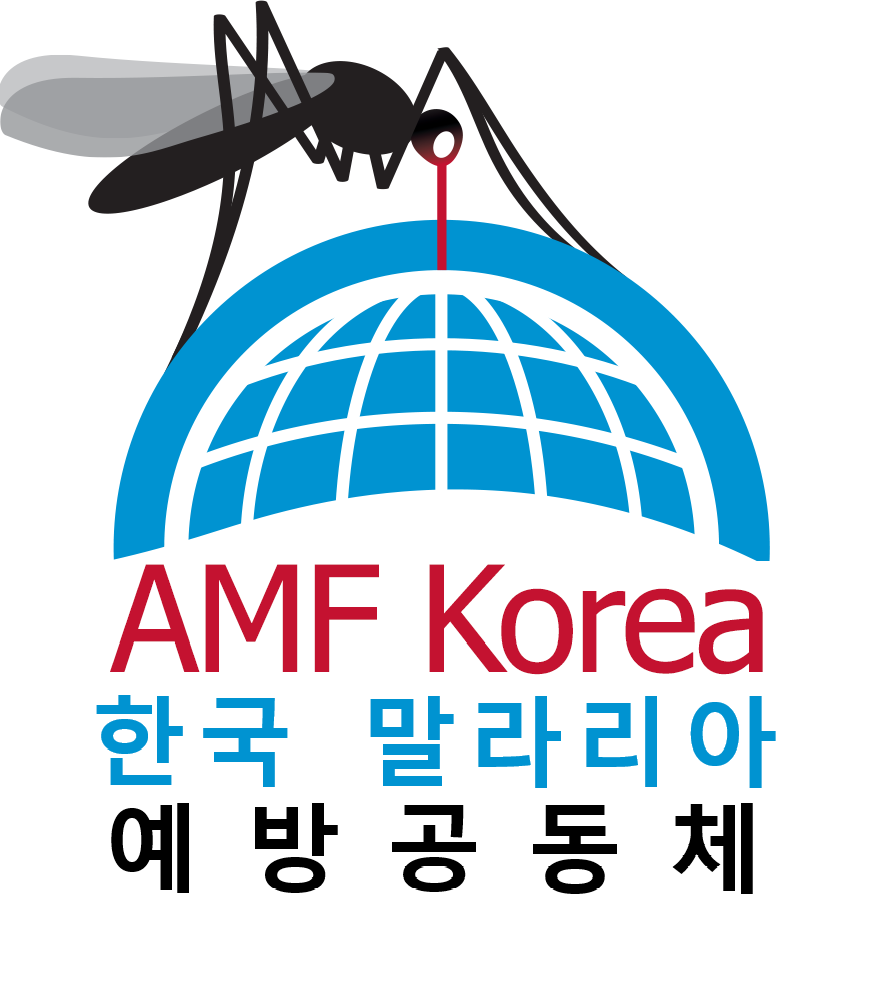
- Formation: August 30, 2023; 2 years ago
- Founder: Rob Mather
- Purpose: Preventing malaria
- Region served: Sub-Saharan Africa, Papua New Guinea
- Board of directors: Graham Nelson, Seok Pyo Hong, Robert Browell, Sang-Hee Rha, ByungJin Lee, Peter Sherratt, Rob Mather
- Website: www.againstmalaria.com/default_kr.aspx

The Against Malaria Foundation Korea (AMF Korea, 한국말라리아 예방공동체) is the South Korean arm of the Against Malaria Foundation charity. AMF Korea provides long-lasting insecticidal nets (LLINs) to populations at high risk of malaria, primarily in Africa.

AMF Korea was established in August 2023. It is presently the only charity rated as highly cost-effective by leading evaluator GiveWell to which donations can be made tax-efficiently within South Korea.

== Work ==
Nets are distributed through partnerships with the International Red Cross, the Malaria Consortium, and others, with partners responsible for the costs of distribution. Distributions include malaria education for the local population, and they are documented through reports, photos, and videos. Post-distribution check-ups are carried out 6, 12, 18, 24, and 30 months to assess net usage and conditions.

As of January 2024, the foundation has raised $555 million, and distributed or committed to fund more than 254 million LLINs since its founding in 2004. AMF estimates that its work to date has saved 185,000 lives and prevented 185 million cases of malaria. Because of the second-order economic damage malaria causes to affected communities (e.g. through medical costs, absence from work, and schooling), AMF estimates that its work has so far benefited the economies of the countries in which it operates by over $6.5 billion.

AMF Korea has seven trustees, headed by President and AMF CEO Rob Mather. The global organization is guided by an advisory committee drawn from malaria experts around the world. The charity is registered in governed by the laws of South Korea. It is also registered in sixteen other countries.

== History ==
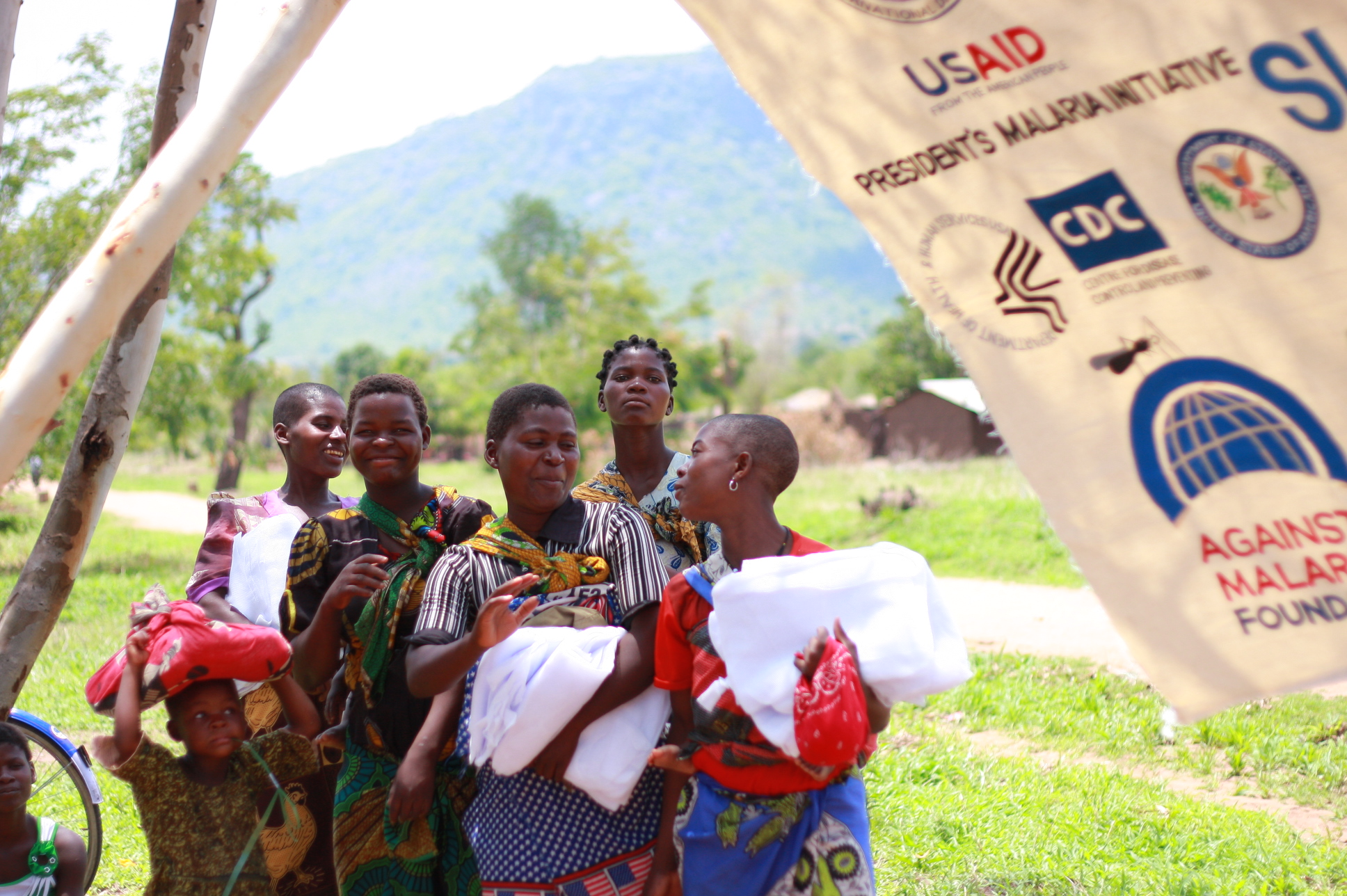
People receiving anti-malarial nets in Malawi

(for the history of AMF, see Against Malaria Foundation)

AMF Korea was established in 2023 as an initiative of the British-Korean community in Korea (the global headquarters of AMF is based in the UK). Its founder is AMF CEO Rob Mather and trustees include British diplomat Graham Nelson.

AMF's cost-effective global model is achieved in part by a highly streamlined structure, staffed primarily by volunteers, conducting no paid advertising, and with its administrative and running costs met through corporate donors and pro-bono partnerships. This model is highly atypical in South Korea (where charities typically maintain offices and significant local operations), leading to media attention and praise for its streamlined approach.

AMF Korea was formally approved for incorporation by the Seoul Metropolitan Government in July 2023, and its eligibility for tax-deductible status confirmed by Korea's National Tax Service in December 2023.

AMF is rated as a highly cost-effective charity by independent evaluator GiveWell. In 2011, AMF was chosen as one of GiveWell's two highest-recommended charities (along with the Schistosomiasis Control Initiative). It has continued to be recommended by GiveWell in each of the intervening thirteen years. Other evaluators recommending AMF include Giving What We Can and The Life You Can Save.

GiveWell estimates that AMF's bed net program costs about US$3000–5000 per life saved.

== Partners and supporters ==
AMF is supported by more than 100 corporations. AMF's founding partners are PwC, Citigroup, Speedo, Microsoft, Allen & Overy, Attenda, Vestergaard Frandsen, and Sumitomo Chemical.

AMF's principal distribution partners are Concern Universal, IMA World Health, and Episcopal Relief & Development.

AMF Korea's principal local partners are Lee & Ko and Samil PWC.
