= St. Margaret's Episcopal Church (Palm Desert, California) =

Coordinates: 33.7034°N 116.3978°W

Religion
- Affiliation: Episcopal Church in the United States of America
- Ecclesiastical or organisational status: active
- Leadership: The Rev. Andrew Butler III, Rector
- Year consecrated: 1965, 1989

Location
- Location: Palm Desert, CA, USA
- Interactive map of St. Margaret's Episcopal Church

Architecture
- Architect: Milt Chambers
- Groundbreaking: 1987
- Completed: 1989

Specifications
- Direction of façade: east
- Capacity: 1000+ (worship)
- Materials: Metal Frame and Stucco

Website
- www.stmargarets.org

St. Margaret's Episcopal Church is located in Palm Desert, California, United States, on State Route 74 in the Coachella Valley region. Parishioners come from Palm Desert, Indian Wells, and the Coachella Valley area. The parish is currently located in a modern church building completed in 1989. In 1963 St. Margaret's congregation was approved by the Bishop of the Diocese of Los Angeles as a mission. The congregation moved became a parish in 1967 with Fr. Brownlee as the first rector. The church facilities are designed as a multi-functional facility with sanctuary, multi-purpose rooms, and administrative offices.

President of the United States Gerald Ford and First Lady Betty Ford were seasonal members of St. Margaret's. Upon his death, Ford was taken to St. Margaret's for a private prayer service, and for public repose.

== History ==
In 1962, John Connell, Senior Warden at St. Paul’s in Palm Springs spoke to Fr. Barnhill about planting a new Episcopal church in the newly developed area of Palm Desert. A committee was formed to gain approval from Bishop Bloy of the Diocese of Los Angeles. The Bishop approved the new congregation in 1963. In 1964, The First Eucharist was celebrated at the Fairway Café in Palm Desert.

The first church building was consecrated in August 1965 by Bishop Rusack of Los Angeles. The Rectory was completed in 1967, and Fr. Brownlee became the First Rector as the congregation became a Parish. Rev. John Harrison became the Second Rector upon Fr. Brownlee's retirement in 1970.

A sanctuary expansion was devised in 1971 which included a new organ developed by Frank Own of St. Paul's Cathedral of Los Angeles. The bell tower was donated in 1974, which included a C bell cast in 1908. Since 1991, world-famous concert organist Frederick Swann has been artist-n-residence.

In 1978, Rev. Bob Burton became the Third Rector as Fr. Harrison retired.

Former President Gerald Ford participated in the ground-breaking ceremony for the new church building in 1987. The current sanctuary was consecrated by Bishop C. Brinkley Morton of San Diego on November 19, 1989. The current chapel was consecrated in 1990 by Bishop Morton.

President of the United States George H. W. Bush and First Lady Barbara Bush attended services at St. Margaret's Church in 1991.

== Public repose of Gerald Ford ==
On December 29, 2006, the casket of former President Gerald Ford was transported by motorcade from Eisenhower Medical Center to St. Margaret's Episcopal Church. The arrival ceremony included musical honors by a Marine Band from Twentynine Palms Marine Base. The casket was carried into the church, where Mrs. Betty Ford and family members attended a private prayer service.

Mrs. Ford and the family received several hundred invited friends and guests for visitation. A time of public repose began at 4:20 p.m. PST and concluded at 8:00 a.m. PST the following day due to overwhelming crowd numbers.

== Betty Ford memorial service ==
On July 12, 2011, a memorial service was held for former First Lady Elizabeth Ford at Mt. Margaret's, attended by former president George W. Bush, First Lady Michelle Obama and former first ladies Rosalynn Carter, Nancy Reagan and Hillary Clinton. The service was broadcast live on C-SPAN, including eulogies by Rosalynn Carter, journalist Cokie Roberts, and Geoffrey Mason.

== Mission today ==
The mission statement for St. Margaret's Episcopal Church includes "a telling presence in the community." St. Margaret's has several community outreach ministries including a food pantry, Angel Tree, Food In Need of Distribution (F.I.N.D.), prison ministry, soup kitchen, domestic abuse shelter, and a literacy program. St. Margaret's also supports the Episcopal Relief & Development Fund, which provided international relief and development.

=== Columbarium ===
The church has a columbarium as part of the Lee and Karns Buildings.

== See also ==
- Episcopal Diocese of San Diego
- Episcopal Church
