= Alexander O'Donovan Shiel =

Irish businessperson

Alexander O'Donovan Shiel (1903–1966) was the managing director and co-founder of the Dublin-based company Kelly & Shiel, and the Irish honorary consul for Austria.

He was secretary of the presbyterian church in Blackrock, Dublin. He became president of the Dublin Chamber of Commerce in 1956 and two years later chair of the Association of Chambers of Commerce for Ireland, a post he held until 1960. He was chair of the National Shippers Committee, the board for the Employment of the Blind and a member of Gorta (later merged with Self Help Africa) and the National Institute of Physical Planning and Construction Research. He was vice-president of the United Services Club in Dublin (now Stephen's Green Club).

He was nominated for the Seanad Éireann in 1956. The same year, he became the honorary consul for Austria. He was awarded an Austrian decoration of merit in 1966. He died aged 63, survived by his wife, Lilian and their children, Brian, Derek and Meriel.
