= Charles Spillane =

Chief Scientist of the FAO

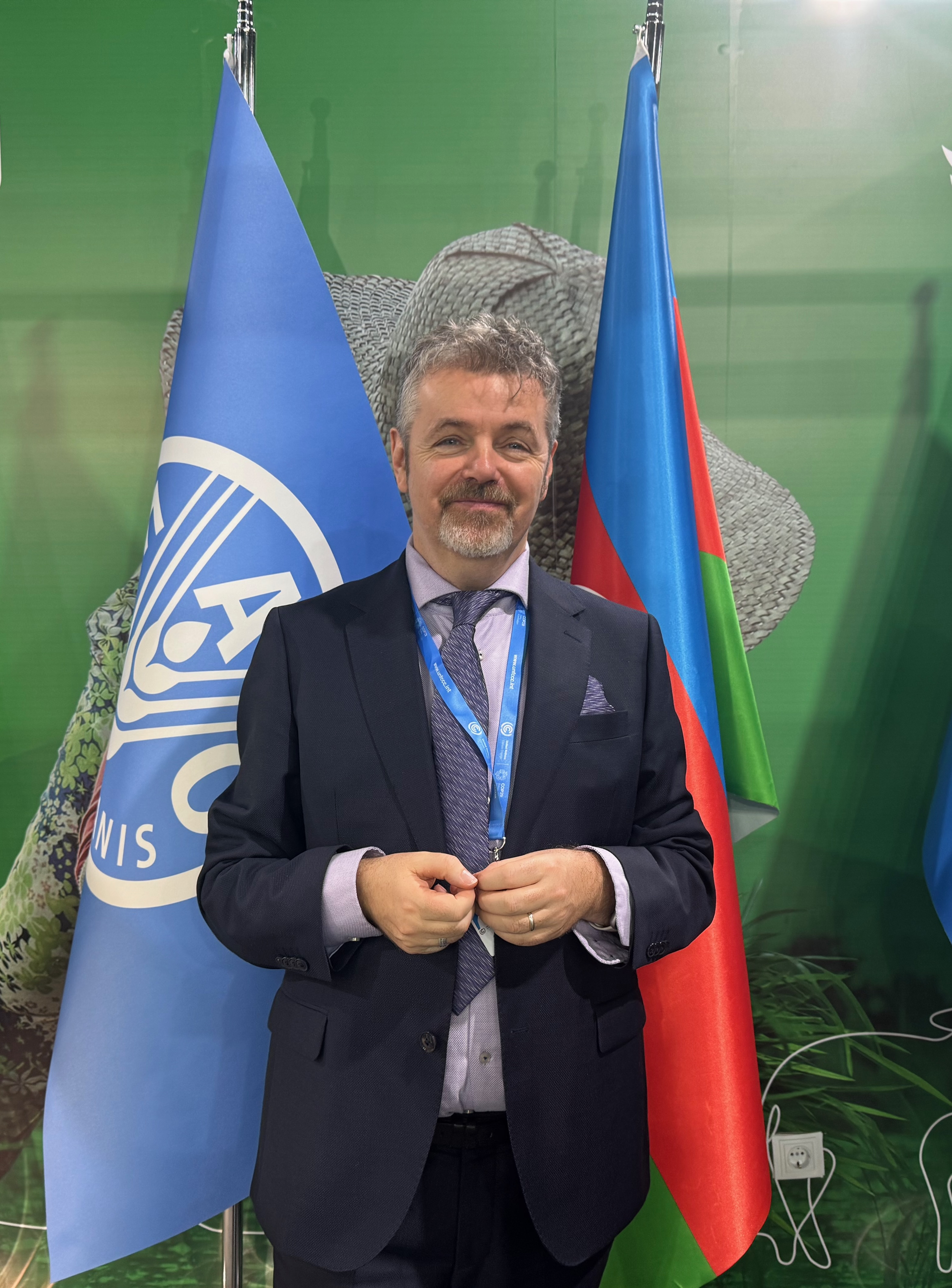
- Born: 31 December 1965 (age 60)
- Education: Dublin City University; Trinity College Dublin
- Known for: Plant genetics & epigenetics
- Spouse: Una Murray
- Scientific career
- Workplaces: Food and Agriculture Organization of the United Nations (FAO); International Center for Tropical Agriculture (CIAT); Cold Spring Harbor Laboratory (CSHL); Friedrich Miescher Institute (FMI); University of Zurich; University College Cork; University of Galway
- Thesis: Genetic Engineering of Potato for Resistance to Potato Virus X.
- Website: www.spillanelab.org

Prof. Charles Spillane is a United Nations diplomat and scientist from Ireland who is the FAO Chief Scientist, within the core leadership team of the Food and Agricultural Organisation of the United Nations.

Prior to joining FAO in January 2026, he has been the Established Professor, the Irish equivalent of a distinguished professorship, (Chair) of Plant Science, and the Lead of the Agriculture, Food Systems, and Bioeconomy Research Centre at the University of Galway, Ireland. He was the Director of the Ryan Institute at the University of Galway from 2017–2023, and Co-founder and Chair of the Irish Forum for International Agricultural Development (IFIAD) from 2016–2026.

== Education ==
After graduating from Dublin City University with a BSc in Biotechnology, Spillane completed his PhD in plant genetic engineering with Tony Kavanagh in the Genetics Dept, Trinity College Dublin, Ireland. His PhD research was focused on development of novel pathogen-derived resistance strategies against singe-stranded RNA viruses such as potato virus X.

== Career ==
Towards the end of his PhD, Spillane founded the Irish Genetic Resources Conservation Trust (IGRCT), a charitable NGO for the conservation of plant and animal genetic resources in Ireland.

After completing his Ph.D., Spillane worked as a Research Assistant in the group of David Baulcombe, Sainsbury Lab, John Innes Centre, Norwich.

After his postdoctoral work, Spillane worked at the headquarters of the Food and Agricultural Organization of the United Nations in Rome, Italy for three years (1995 – 1998). He also completed work for the Consultative Group on International Agricultural Research (CGIAR) Centers including IPGRI and Bioversity International, and with the United Nations Industrial Development Organization (UNIDO) on biosafety during this time.

In 1998, Spillane left Italy for the US and later Switzerland, where he worked as a Postdoctoral Research Fellow with Ueli Grossniklaus on plant epigenetics and apomixis technology development at the Delbruck Laboratory, Cold Spring Harbor Laboratory (CSHL), New York, USA, the Friedrich Miescher Institute, Basel, Switzerland, and at the Department of Plant & Microbial Biology, University of Zürich, Switzerland.

In 2003, Spillane moved back to Ireland where he established his research group in University College Cork, Ireland. In 2009, Spillane moved his research group to the University of Galway, where he was elected as Established Professor (Chair) of Plant Science. Spillane acted as Head of Discipline of Botany & Plant Science from 2009 – 2014 at the university. In 2017, Spillane was appointed as Director of the Ryan Institute.

Spillane established two degrees at University of Galway: the MSc Climate Change, Agriculture and Food Security (MScCCAFS) programme and the MSc AgriFood Sustainability and Technology (MScAST) programme. He further co-founded (with Cathal O'Donoghue) the University of Galway’s BSc. in Agricultural Sciences.

Spillane is a co-founder of (and was Chair of until January 2026) the Irish Forum for International Agricultural Development (IFIAD). Between 2024-2026, Spillane was a member of Board of Trustees of the CGIAR's International Centre for Agricultural Research in the Dry Areas.

In January 2026, Spillane began working within the Core Leadership Team of the Food and Agriculture Organization of the United Nations as the FAO Chief Scientist.

== Personal life ==
Spillane is married to Una Murray an Associate Professor in international development working with the University of Galway. The couple have two daughters, Shauna and Rian.
