= Death and state funeral of Gerald Ford =

2006–07 funeral of the 38th U.S. president

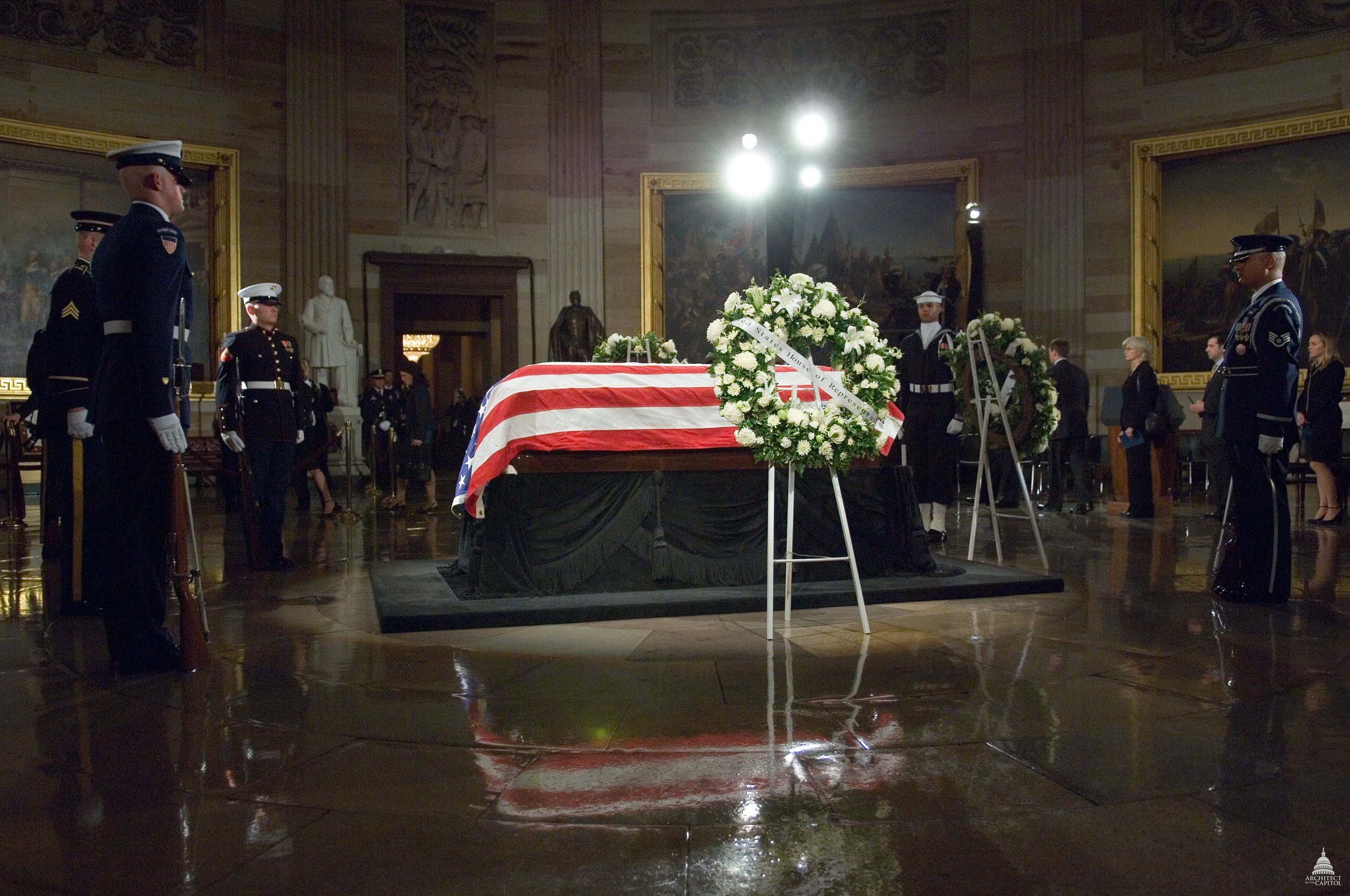
- Ford lies in state in the U.S. Capitol rotunda
- Date: December 30, 2006 – January 3, 2007 (state funeral); December 27, 2006 – January 25, 2007 (mourning period)
- Location: Capitol Rotunda, U.S. Capitol, Washington, D.C., U.S.
- Organized by: JTF-NCR; U.S. Department of Defense
- Participants: Jimmy Carter; George H. W. Bush; Bill Clinton; George W. Bush; Dick Cheney; Members of the 109th United States Congress; Members-elect of the 110th United States Congress

On December 26, 2006, Gerald Ford, the 38th president of the United States and the 40th vice president, died at his home at 40471 Sand Dune Rd., in Rancho Mirage, California, at 6:45 p.m. local time (02:45, December 27, UTC). At 8:49 p.m. local time, his wife of 58 years, Betty Ford, issued a statement announcing his death. The causes of death listed on the death certificate were arteriosclerotic cerebrovascular disease and diffuse arteriosclerosis.

At the age of 93 years and 165 days, Ford was the longest-lived U.S. president in history at the time of his death, a record which has since been surpassed by George H. W. Bush and Jimmy Carter.

Ford was the second former U.S. president to die during the presidency of George W. Bush and the second to die in the twenty-first century, the first being Ronald Reagan.

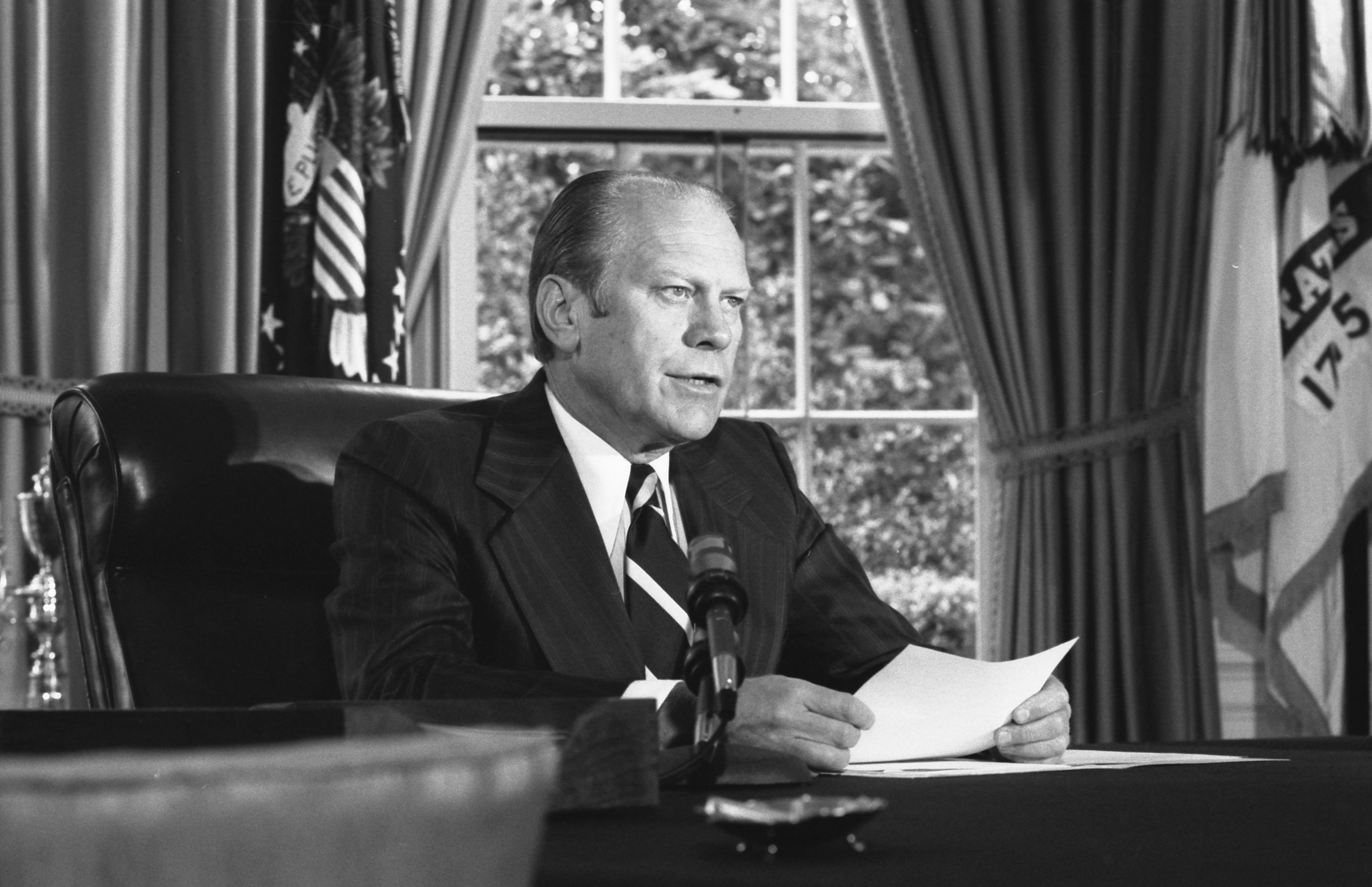
Gerald R. Ford

== Tributes from world leaders ==
Upon Ford's death, President George W. Bush said in a written statement:

Laura and I are greatly saddened by the passing of former President Gerald R. Ford. President Ford was a great American who gave many years of dedicated service to our country. On August 9, 1974, after a long career in the House of Representatives and service as Vice President, he assumed the Presidency in an hour of national turmoil and division. With his quiet integrity, common sense, and kind instincts, President Ford helped heal our land and restore public confidence in the Presidency. The American people will always admire Gerald Ford's devotion to duty, his personal character, and the honorable conduct of his administration. We mourn the loss of such a leader, and our 38th President will always have a special place in our Nation's memory. On behalf of all Americans, Laura and I offer our deepest sympathies to Betty Ford and all of President Ford's family. Our thoughts and prayers will be with them in the hours and days ahead.

There were also tributes from other Americans, including the living former American presidents: Jimmy Carter, George H. W. Bush, and Bill Clinton, as well as Ford's former Chief of Staff, Vice President Dick Cheney and former First Lady Nancy Reagan.

Foreign leaders who paid tribute included Canadian Prime Minister Stephen Harper, Czech President Václav Klaus and German President Horst Köhler. Harper advised Governor General Michaëlle Jean to order all flags across Canada flown to half-staff from sunrise to sunset on January 2, 2007, in sympathy with the national day of mourning in the U.S. In the United Kingdom, the Union Flag at Buckingham Palace was flown at half-staff on December 28.

== Funeral arrangements ==
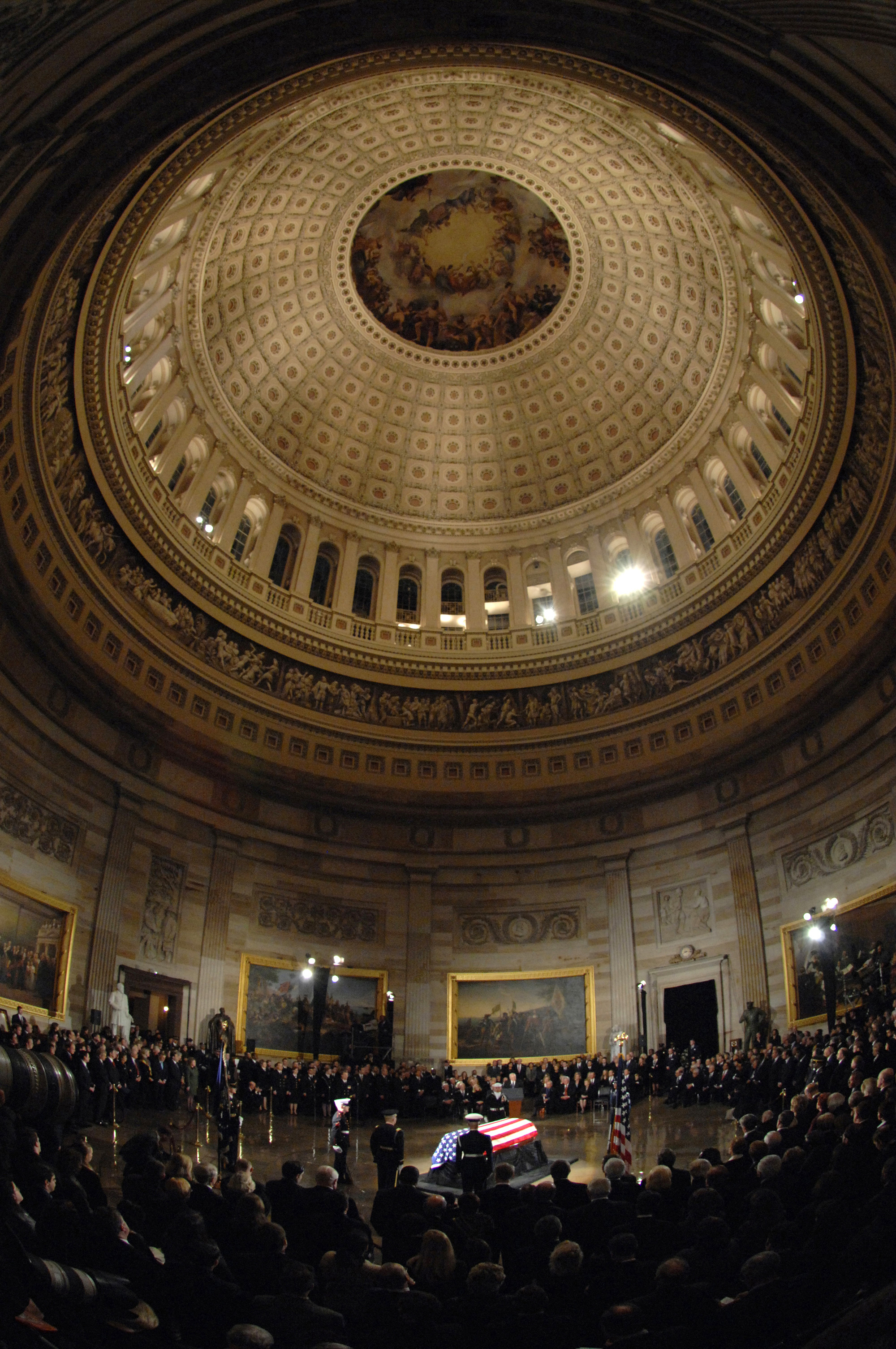
Ford is honored during a memorial service in the U.S. Capitol Rotunda in Washington, D.C., December 30, 2006.

Gregory Willard, President Ford's personal attorney and former White House aide, was responsible for the overall planning and conduct of the state funeral as president and Mrs. Ford and the Ford family's designated personal representative. The Joint Force Headquarters National Capital Region (JFHQ-NCR)/Military District of Washington (MDW), which oversees the military and ceremonial portions of state funerals, assisted President Ford and the Ford family in development of the funeral plans.

Army Major General Guy C. Swan III, Commanding General of the MDW (CG MDW) and JFHQ-NCR, was Betty Ford's official escort throughout the State Funeral. Michael Wagener, Chief of State Funeral Plans, was the MDW civilian liaison for the Ford family. Mr. Wagner provided advice to president and Mrs. Ford and the Ford family in planning the state funeral and accompanied the family throughout the state funeral.

The schedule for the state funeral was announced at a press briefing on December 27 in Palm Desert, California. The briefing was conducted by Gregory Willard, and also attended by Barbara Owens, spokesperson for the MDW, and by the Riverside County Sheriff. A personal statement from Betty Ford was read by Willard, and he announced details and answered media questions regarding the state funeral.

President and Mrs. Ford and their family previously chose to have the state funeral and related services conducted in three phases (Palm Desert, California; Washington, DC; Grand Rapids, Michigan), with interment in a previously selected hillside tomb next to the Gerald R. Ford Presidential Museum in Grand Rapids, Michigan. The services and ceremonies were conducted from December 29 through January 3.

Columnist Peggy Noonan summarized the nation's heartfelt farewell, "Ford's was the most human of presidential funerals. Maybe because the Fords wanted so little done, so insisted on modesty, all that was done was genuine and sincere, and ... perfect."

The state funeral took place at the U.S. Capitol on Saturday, December 30, 2006, with further funeral services on January 2 at Washington National Cathedral and on January 3 at Grace Episcopal Church in Grand Rapids. In addition, private services were conducted with Mrs. Ford and the family at St. Margaret's Episcopal Church in Palm Desert, California, and at the Gerald R. Ford Presidential Museum in Grand Rapids, Michigan. Mrs. Ford and her family also received approximately 300 invited guests at a December 29 visitation at St. Margaret's Church.

Ford's casket was flown to Washington and then on to Grand Rapids aboard the VC-25A Presidential Aircraft (29000), which normally serves as Air Force One. The hearse used to carry President Ford's casket flew the American Flag and had the Presidential Seal affixed to the sides.

Upon Ford's death, the nation's flags were ordered flown at half staff for 30 days. President George W. Bush declared a national day of mourning for President Ford on Tuesday, January 2, 2007, to mark the funeral service.

There were twenty honorary pallbearers for the services and ceremonies in Washington, D.C., and thirteen honorary pallbearers in Grand Rapids.

- Martin J. Allen, Jr., retired banker;
- James A. Baker III, former Secretary of State and Secretary of the Treasury; President Ford's Under Secretary of Commerce and Presidential Campaign National Chairman;
- Robert E. Barrett, President Ford's White House Army Aide;
- James Cannon, President Ford's White House Domestic Policy Advisor; author, Time And Chance: Gerald Ford's Appointment With History;
- Kenneth I. Chenault, chairman and chief executive officer, American Express Company;
- Dick Cheney, Vice President of the United States; former Secretary of Defense; President Ford's White House Chief of Staff;
- Mary Sue Coleman, President, University of Michigan;
- William T. Coleman, Jr., President Ford's Secretary of Transportation;
- Richard DeVos, co-founder of Amway Corporation;
- Robert J. Dole, Former U.S. Senator; 1996 Republican presidential candidate; President Ford's vice presidential running mate;
- Richard A. Ford, Younger brother of President Ford;
- David G. Frey, Philanthropist and bank executive with JPMorgan Chase;
- Pepi Gramshammer, Member of original founders group – Vail, Colorado; former member, Austrian National Ski Team;
- Alan Greenspan, Former Chairman of the Board of Governors of the Federal Reserve System; chairman, President Ford's Council of Economic Advisors;
- Robert T. Hartmann, White House Counsellor to President Ford;
- Carla A. Hills, President Ford's Secretary of Housing and Urban Development;
- Robert L. Hooker, Philanthropist and retired business executive;
- Henry A. Kissinger, President Ford's Secretary of State and National Security Advisor;
- John O. Marsh, White House Counsellor to President Ford;
- Frederik Meijer, Chairman Emeritus, Meijer, Inc.;
- Jack Nicklaus, Professional Golfer; chairman, Nicklaus Design;
- Paul H. O'Neill, Former Secretary of the Treasury; deputy director, President Ford's Office of Management and Budget;
- Leon W. Parma, President, Parma Management Co., Inc.;
- Donald H. Rumsfeld, President Ford's White House Chief of Staff and Secretary of Defense;
- Brent Scowcroft, President Ford's National Security Advisor;
- Peter F. Secchia, Retired Businessman;
- L. William Seidman, President Ford's White House Assistant for Economic Policy;
- Steve Van Andel, chairman, Alticor Inc.;
- Sanford I. Weill, Chairman Emeritus, Citigroup Inc.;
- Frank Zarb, Administrator of President Ford's Federal Energy Administration;
- Glenn "Bo" Schembechler (In memoriam), former Head Football Coach, University of Michigan.

Former President Jimmy Carter and his wife Rosalynn accompanied Mrs. Ford and the Ford family aboard the presidential aircraft from Washington, DC to Grand Rapids. Vice President and Mrs. Dick Cheney and former Ford White House Chief of Staff and Secretary of Defense and Mrs. Donald Rumsfeld joined the Ford family in Grand Rapids for the funeral service at Grace Episcopal Church and for the subsequent interment. At the conclusion of the interment service, Vice President Cheney presented the folded American flag from the casket to Mrs. Ford.

Several elements of the state funeral paid tribute to Ford's service in the Navy during World War II. They included a member of the Navy bearing the presidential flag, the Navy Hymn, "Eternal Father, Strong to Save", a Navy rifle team firing three volleys, and a Navy bugler blowing "Taps", a boatswain's mate sounding "Pipe The Side" at the World War II Memorial, the Chaplain of the Navy reading the Prayers during the Funeral Service at the National Cathedral, and female naval officers who were graduates of the U.S. Naval Academy gathering at the ceremonial pause at the World War II Memorial to pay tribute to President Ford's being the first president to appoint women to the Naval Academy.

=== Security measures ===
The Department of Homeland Security designated the Washington phase of the state funeral as a National Special Security Event.

== Events in California ==
Ford's body was taken to Eisenhower Medical Center, where it remained until the start of state funeral services on December 29. That day, his casket was transported by motorcade from Eisenhower Hospital to St. Margaret's Episcopal Church in Palm Desert, California. Mrs. Ford and the family proceeded to the porch of St. Margaret's from where they viewed the arrival ceremony. Mrs. Ford was accompanied on the porch by General Guy Swan, her children and their spouses. Opposite them on the porch were President and Mrs. Ford's seven grandchildren, and their spouses, and two of their four great-granddaughters. The arrival ceremony included musical honors by a Marine Band from Twentynine Palms Marine Base. The casket was carried into the church, where Mrs. Ford and family members attended a private prayer service inside. Following the prayer service, Mrs. Ford and the family had a period of private time alone in the church. Thereafter, long-time staff members of President Ford, including Ms. Penny Circle, Ms. Ann Cullen, Mr. Lee Simmons, and Mr. David Hume Kennerly, were escorted by Gregory Willard to pay their respects at the casket.

Beginning at 1:20 p.m., Mrs. Ford and the family received several hundred invited friends and guests until 3:10 p.m. After the visitation, Mrs. Ford and the family returned to the Ford residence in Rancho Mirage, California, and members of President and Mrs. Ford's U.S. Secret Service detail and their families, together with local law enforcement and government officials, were invited to pay their respects privately at the casket. The casket was then moved onto the altar at St. Margaret's, and a period of public repose commenced at 4:20 p.m. PST. The public repose continued until the following morning. Due to the extremely large crowds who wished to pay their respects to the former president, the public was directed to the Indian Wells Tennis Garden, from where they were transported by shuttle buses to and from the public repose at St. Margaret's Church. Each person attending the repose was presented a special tribute card on behalf of Mrs. Ford and the family. During the repose, some family members returned to St. Margaret's and greeted and thanked several thousand of the guests for their tributes and condolences.

The public repose concluded at approximately 8:00 a.m. on December 30, 2006. At 8:45 a.m. Mrs. Ford and her family returned to St. Margaret's Church, where a Departure Ceremony was conducted. President Ford's casket was then transported by motorcade to Palm Springs International Airport, where large crowds had gathered to pay tribute to President Ford and say farewell. Following a departure ceremony at the airport that included musical honors and a 21-gun salute by a cannon battery from 3rd Battalion 11th Marines, the casket was loaded onto a Boeing VC-25 at approximately 9:55 a.m. The aircraft departed shortly thereafter en route to Washington, D.C.

== Events in Washington ==
The events in Washington, D.C. began on December 30, 2006, when Ford's body, flown aboard the Presidential VC-25A (SAM 29000), arrived at Andrews Air Force Base that evening. From there, it was driven by hearse in a simple procession, passing through Alexandria, Virginia, to pay tribute to where he lived when in the House, into the capital city, pausing by the National World War II Memorial to pay tribute to his service as a Lieutenant Commander in the U.S. Navy during World War II, and onto Capitol Hill. At the World War II Memorial, Eagle Scouts stood along the street for a short distance, in honor of Ford's status as an Eagle Scout. In addition, Ford was piped aboard, a Navy tradition used to honor senior officers, including his position as Commander in Chief.

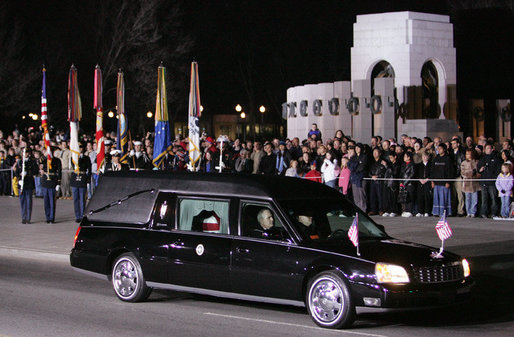
Hearse with Ford's body pauses at the World War II Memorial

Female alumnae of U.S. military academies joined in an elongated salute in tribute to Ford. Ford signed legislation in 1976 allowing women to attend the military academies.

Ford's family honored his wishes to have details of his funeral made as simple as possible. As such, a hearse was utilized en route to the Capitol, rather than having the sometimes utilized horse-drawn caisson.

=== Capitol Hill events ===
Upon arrival at the U.S. Capitol and in an unprecedented historical tribute to President Ford's distinction as the President who served the longest in the House of Representatives, his casket was carried up the east House Steps and then placed in repose just outside the main doors to the House Chamber. The casket remained there for a brief period of repose throughout which, in another unprecedented tribute to Ford, the doors to the House Chamber were opened and the House Chamber was lit during the period of Repose. The casket was then carried through Statuary Hall to the Rotunda to lie in state on Abraham Lincoln's catafalque.

The Rev. Daniel Coughlin, the House of Representatives' chaplain, gave the invocation. Eulogies were delivered by Senate President pro tempore Ted Stevens, House Speaker Dennis Hastert, and Vice President Dick Cheney. The service was briefly interrupted when one of the mourners, former U.S. Congressman William Broomfield, collapsed from exhaustion.

After the eulogies, the eulogists laid a wreath, Pastor Barry Black, Senate chaplain gave the benediction. The dignitaries, which included members of the U.S. Congress, the U.S. Supreme Court, and members of the diplomatic corps and others, paid their respects during the next half hour.

=== Public viewing ===
The doors were opened to the public after the dignitaries filed by. The Capitol Rotunda remained open until midnight EST.

Viewing continued through Sunday, December 31 and Monday, January 1. People visited the rotunda at a rate of 2,500 per hour. Members of the Ford family were on hand in the Rotunda to receive the public who came to pay their respects.

President George W. Bush and his wife, Laura, visited the Rotunda after coming back from Crawford, Texas and paid their respects, as did former Presidents Jimmy Carter, George H.W. Bush, Bill Clinton, and their respective spouses. In all, about 57,000 people paid their respects to Ford in the Rotunda.

The Rotunda closed early on Tuesday morning, January 2, 2007, to allow preparations for the second half of the Washington ceremonies, which were held in Washington's National Cathedral. In an unprecedented tribute, Ford's casket was taken from the Rotunda to the Senate side of the Capitol, where he lay in repose for a short period of time, in tribute to his service as Vice President (the Vice President serves as President of the Senate by direction of the Constitution). The hymn "Abide With Me" was played as Ford's casket was carried down the Senate steps to a hearse for the trip to the National Cathedral for a mid-morning service. As the cortège moved from the Capitol to the cathedral, the carillon's bells tolled 38 times to honor the 38th president.

== National funeral service ==
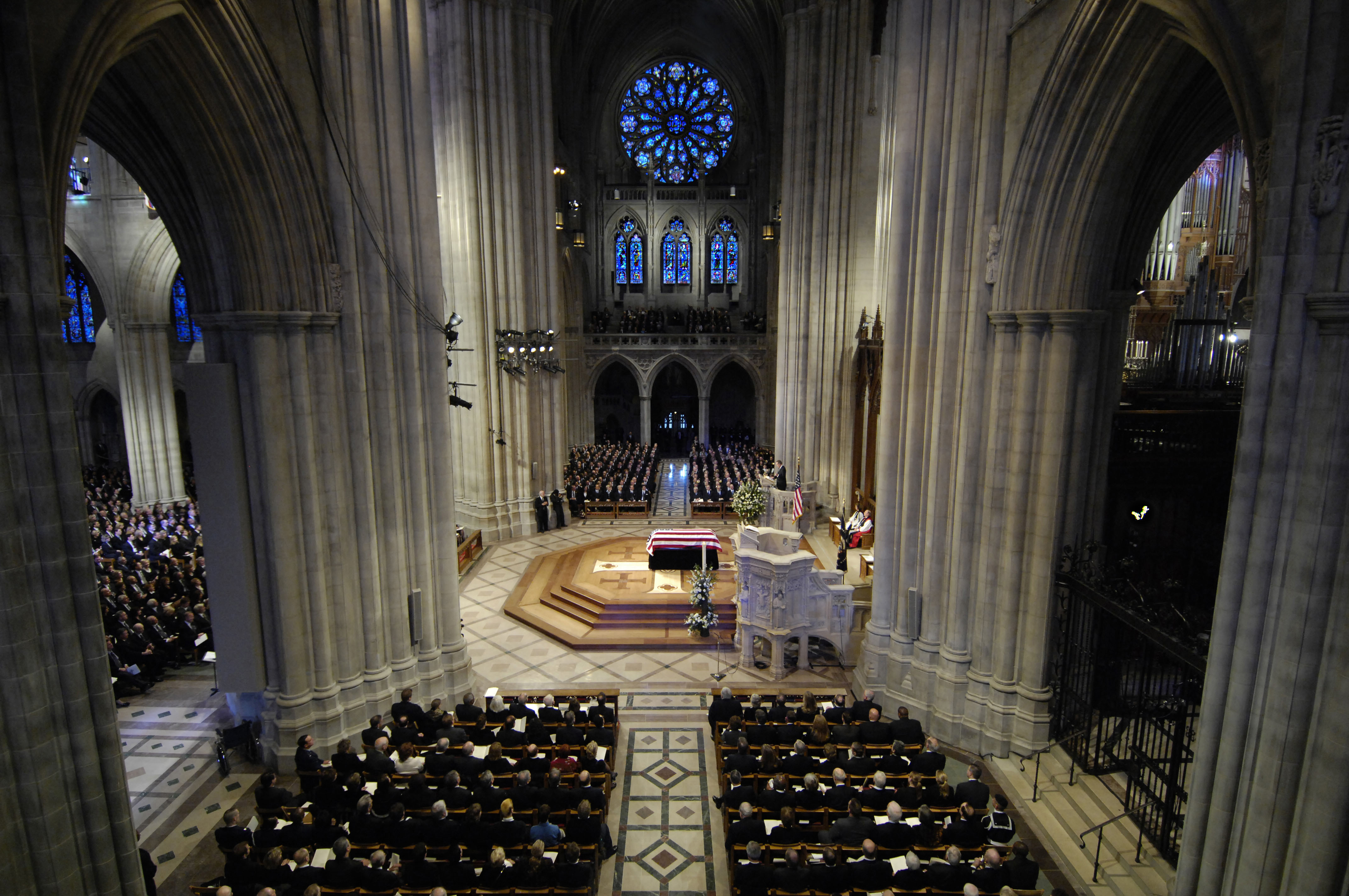
Funeral of President Ford in Washington National Cathedral.

As the casket was removed from the hearse, the U.S. Coast Guard Band played Hail to the Chief and Nearer, My God, to Thee.

The service (Note: The Christian service strictly followed Episcopal liturgy "Burial of the Dead, Rite I.") in Washington National Cathedral was officially entitled "In Celebration of and Thanksgiving for the Life of Gerald Rudolph Ford, 1913-2006."

=== Music ===
Service music was provided by the cathedral organists; the United States Marine Orchestra (COL Michael Colburn, Conductor); Armed Forces Chorus (LTC John Clanton, Conductor); Cathedral Choirs of Men, Boys and Girls; and opera soloist Denyce Graves. The congregation sang the hymn, "For All the Saints". All selections had been chosen by President and Mrs. Ford while planning the service. Musical selections chosen by the Fords are included below as a footnote. (Note: Some of the music that was played during various services included four ruffles and flourishes, "Hail to the Chief", "O God, Our Help in Ages Past", "America, the Beautiful", "All Hail the Power of Jesus' Name", "The King of Love My Shepherd Is", "The Lord's Prayer", "Holy Ghost with Light Divine", "Abide With Me", "Soul of My Savior", "Nearer, My God, to Thee", "Holy, Holy, Holy", "Going Home", "The Yellow and Blue", "The Victors", "Amazing Grace", "Crown Him With Many Crowns", "Fairest Lord Jesus", "A Mighty Fortress is our God", "Battle Hymn of the Republic", "God Bless America", "Faith of Our Fathers", and "The Star-Spangled Banner".)

=== Readings and eulogies ===
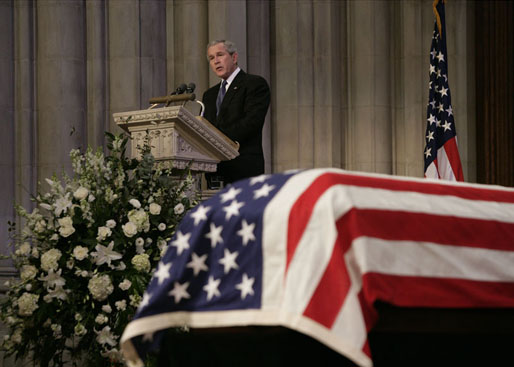
President George W. Bush gives a eulogy at President Gerald Ford's national funeral service

Ford was eulogized by former President George H. W. Bush (director of the U.S. Liaison Office in Beijing and Director of the CIA in the Ford Administration), Dr. Henry Kissinger (Secretary of State in the Ford Administration), former NBC Nightly News anchor Tom Brokaw (NBC White House correspondent during the Ford Administration), and by President George W. Bush. The homily (sermon) was delivered by the Rev. Dr. Robert G. Certain, the Fords' pastor in Palm Desert, California. Scripture was read by President Ford's son, John (Jack) Ford, and daughter, Susan Ford Bales.

=== Dignitaries ===
President George W. Bush and First Lady Laura Bush, Vice President Dick Cheney and Second Lady Lynne Cheney, former Presidents Jimmy Carter, George H. W. Bush, and Bill Clinton, along with their respective wives, former First Ladies Rosalynn Carter, Barbara Bush, and Hillary Clinton, attended the funeral services. Former First Lady Nancy Reagan also attended the funeral services. Former First Lady Lady Bird Johnson, who died 6 months after Ford's state funeral, was represented by her older daughter Lynda Bird Johnson Robb. Also attending were presidential children Tricia Nixon Cox, Dorothy Bush Koch, and Chelsea Clinton. Near the altar of the Cathedral just prior to the funeral service, President and Mrs. Ford's son-in-law, Vaden Bales, greeted Supreme Court Justice John Paul Stevens, who was the only Justice appointed to the Supreme Court by President Ford, and thanked him on behalf of Mrs. Ford and the Ford family for his distinguished service on the Court. Also seated with the Ford family were former Second Lady Happy Rockefeller, the widow of Ford's former Vice President Nelson Rockefeller, her son Nelson Rockefeller Jr., as well as Virginia Senator John Warner. Only two foreign delegates were presented, which were Shimon Peres (the President of Israel) and Brian Mulroney (the former Prime Minister of Canada). In addition, about 100 foreign ambassadors and diplomats attended the service.

At the conclusion of the service, Vice President Cheney accompanied the casket from the altar, and President George W. Bush and Steven Ford escorted Mrs. Ford to the cathedral narthex.

== Events in Grand Rapids ==
Following the service in the National Cathedral in Washington, D.C., the casket was taken to Andrews Air Force Base on January 2 for the flight to Grand Rapids, Michigan on SAM 29000, one of the two VC-25A aircraft which currently serves as Air Force One. En route, the plane descended to very low altitude and flew over Ford's alma mater, the University of Michigan and Michigan Stadium in Ann Arbor, where Ford played center on Michigan's college football team from 1932 to 1934.

Upon arrival in Grand Rapids, the university of Michigan Marching Band played ruffles and flourishes, "Hail to the Chief", Michigan's alma mater "The Yellow and Blue", and the university's fight song "The Victors", and a 21-gun salute was rendered as Ford's casket was transferred from the aircraft to the waiting hearse at Gerald R. Ford International Airport. The casket was then taken by motorcade to the Gerald R. Ford Presidential Museum in Grand Rapids. A private service was conducted in the Museum. The presidents of the University of Michigan and Yale University, representing President Ford's college and law school education, laid wreaths, Grand Rapids Mayor George Heartwell gave the invocation, and Michigan Governor Jennifer Granholm spoke. "Shall We Gather At The River" was sung by The Army Chorus, and prayers were offered by Mayor Heartwell. Also present for the service were the four remaining members of the 30/30 Club, consisting of President Ford's championship high school football team.

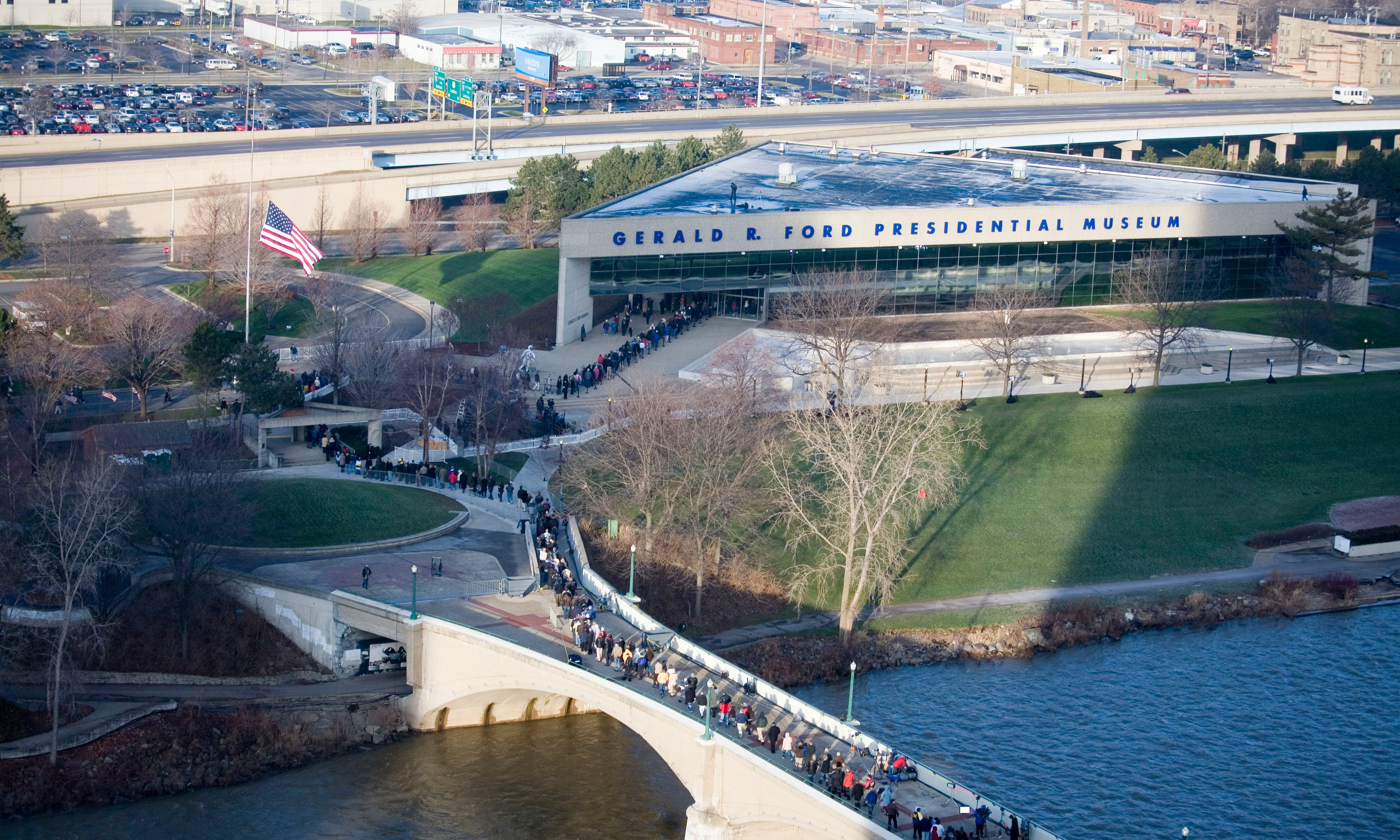
Citizens lining outside of the Gerald R. Ford Presidential Museum in Grand Rapids, Michigan during a public visitation of Ford.

On Tuesday night (January 2), the former President's remains lay in repose in the museum's lobby where an estimated 67,000 mourners, despite the cold winter temperatures, stood in line for over 6 hours in order to pay their respects to Ford. Several of President and Mrs. Ford's children and grandchildren came to the museum that night and greeted mourners for several hours.

Shortly after noon on January 3, Ford's body was removed from the museum and taken by motorcade to Grace Episcopal Church in East Grand Rapids, where a private funeral service was conducted. Thousands of people lined the entire motorcade route to the church.

During the service, eulogies were delivered by Donald Rumsfeld (President Ford's White House Chief of Staff and Secretary of Defense), former President Jimmy Carter, Richard Norton Smith (former Director of the Gerald R. Ford Presidential Library and Museum and a close personal friend of President Ford), President Bush, and Vice President Cheney. Gerald R. Ford Presidential Library and Museum Prayers were offered by Sarah Ford Goodfellow, Tyne Vance Berlanga, and Christian Gerald Ford, grandchildren of President and Mrs. Ford. The Army Chorus sang "The Battle Hymn Of The Republic" and a solo of "On Eagle's Wings" sung by Master Sergeant Alvy Powell. One pew was draped with a University of Michigan stadium blanket in honor of legendary Michigan coach Bo Schembechler, who was to be an honorary pallbearer for President Ford but died two months earlier.

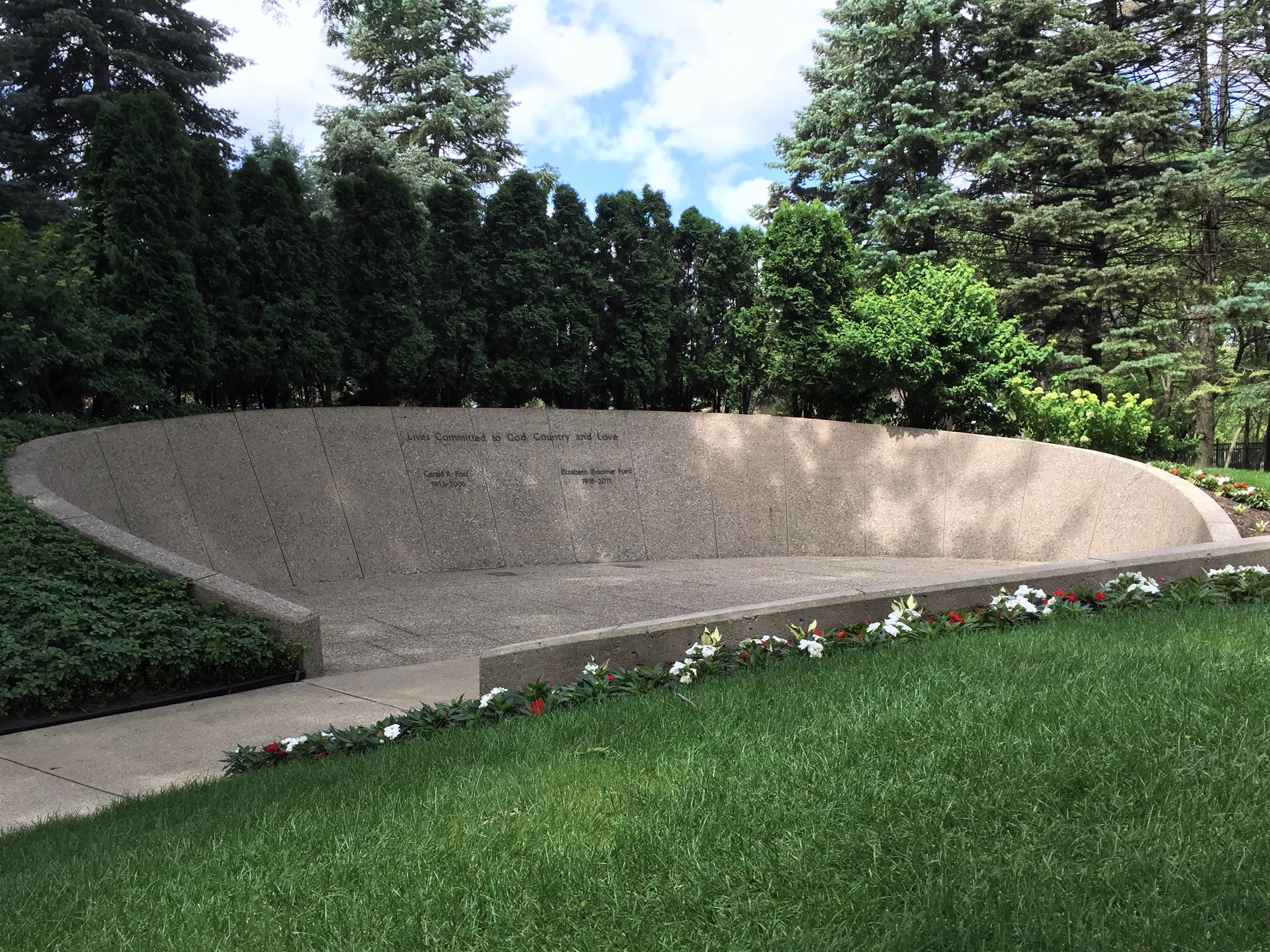
Gravesite of Gerald Ford and Betty Ford

After the church service, Ford's remains were transported back to the museum and carried to his tomb in a hillside just north of the museum. A small group of invited friends joined Mrs. Ford and the family at the Interment Service, including Vice President and Mrs. Richard Cheney, former President and Mrs. Jimmy Carter, former Secretary and Mrs. Rumsfeld, Ann Cullen, Len Nurmi, Penny Circle, Richard Norton Smith, Gregory Willard, Ann Willard, and Ms. Lilian Fisher. The 126th Army Band from the National Guard Unit based in Wyoming, Michigan performed during the Interment Service. A 21-gun salute was completed by the 119th Field Artillery Regiment, the only such unit in the state of Michigan. After the salute, a benediction was given. Three volleys from seven rifles were then fired, followed by the playing of "Taps". As "Taps" was sounded, 21 F-15E's from Seymour Johnson AFB in North Carolina did a south-to-north missing man flyby of the casket just as the sun began to set on the western horizon. The flag covering Ford's casket was then folded and presented to Mrs. Ford by Vice President Cheney, at which point media coverage of the Interment Service, by prior request of the Ford family, concluded.

After the Interment Service, Mrs. Ford and her family and President Ford's brother, Dick Ford, spent a few moments at the casket and then proceeded inside the Museum. Vice President and Mrs. Cheney, President and Mrs. Carter, and former Secretary and Mrs. Rumsfeld approached the casket together for their final farewells. They then proceeded inside the Museum with Mrs. Ford. Lilian Fisher, Ann Cullen, Leonard Nurmi, Penny Circle, Richard Norton Smith, Gregory Willard, Ann Willard, Douglas "Chip" Emery, Richard Garbarino, Michael Wagner, Janice Hart, and Carol Buck were individually escorted to the casket. As a special tribute to Master Sergeant Alvy Powell of the Army Chorus and his thirty years of friendship with President and Mrs. Ford, he was escorted by Greg Willard to the casket where he paid his final respects. Honorary Pallbearers Richard DeVos, Robert Hooker, Jack Nicklaus, Fred Meijer, Leon Parma, Dr. Mary Sue Coleman, David Frey, and the other Honorary Pallbearers and spouses then approached the casket, along with Shelli Archibald, Jordan Lewis, Lee Simmons, Jeannete Simmons, and other guests. Later that evening, members of the Army Chorus were accompanied by Michael Wagner to the casket, where each of them paid his respects. At approximately 12:38 a.m. that night, President Ford's casket was placed into his tomb during a private procedure, following which the tomb was closed and sealed.

Before departing Grand Rapids the following afternoon, Mrs. Ford and her family returned to President Ford's tomb. In front of the tomb was a large bouquet of flowers that had been prepared from individual flowers taken from bouquets and other floral tributes placed by members of the public earlier in the week.

== Attending guests ==
=== American politicians ===
Thousands of American politicians attended the funeral, including:

- President George W. Bush and First Lady Laura Bush
- Former president Bill Clinton and former first lady Hillary Clinton
- Former president George H. W. Bush and former first lady Barbara Bush
- Former president Jimmy Carter (Ford's 1976 election opponent) and former first lady Rosalynn Carter
- Former first lady Nancy Reagan
- Former first lady Betty Ford (Ford's widow)
- Vice President Dick Cheney (Ford's White House chief of staff) and Second Lady Lynne Cheney

== Gallery ==
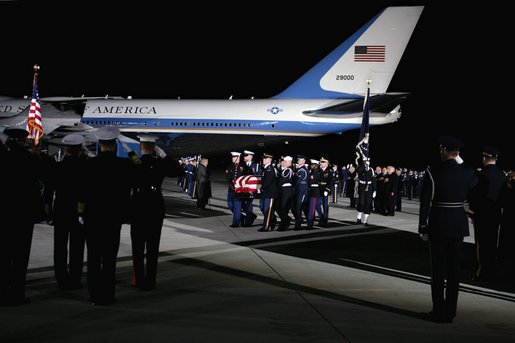
Honor guards carry the casket of former President Gerald R. Ford upon arrival to Andrews Air Force Base in Maryland, Saturday, December 30, 2006.

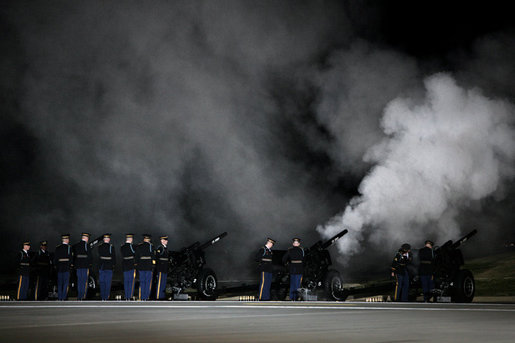
A 21-gun salute is given during the arrival of the casket of former President Gerald R. Ford at Andrews Air Force Base in Maryland, Saturday, December 30, 2006.

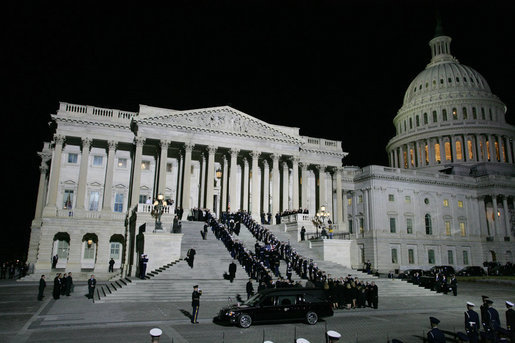
Honor guards carry the casket of former President Gerald R. Ford up the East Steps of the United States Capitol Building, Saturday evening, Dec. 30, 2006 in Washington, D.C.

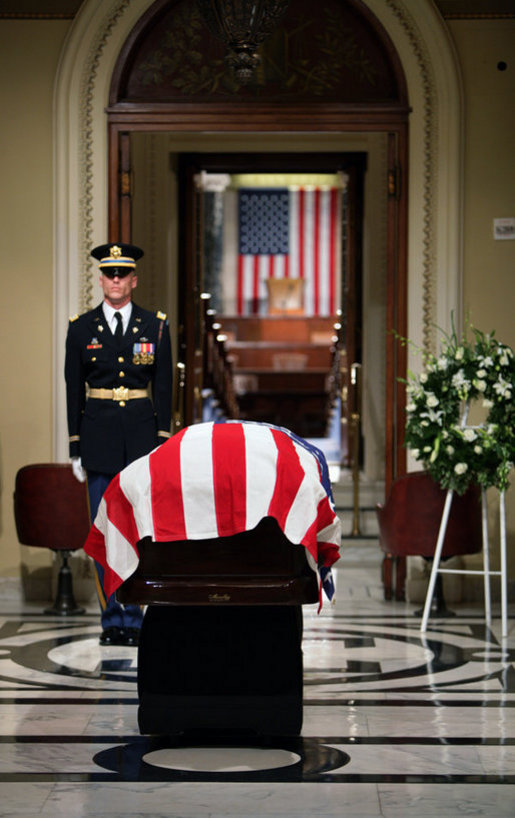
Former President Gerald R. Ford lies in repose in front of the House Chamber at the United States Capitol Building, Saturday, December 30, 2006.

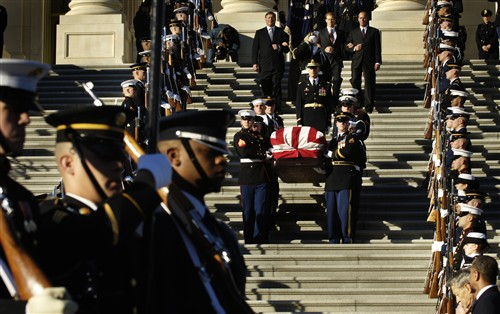
Honor guards carry the casket of former President Gerald R. Ford out of the United States Capitol Building in Washington, D.C., January 2, 2007 en route to Washington's National Cathedral for a funeral service.

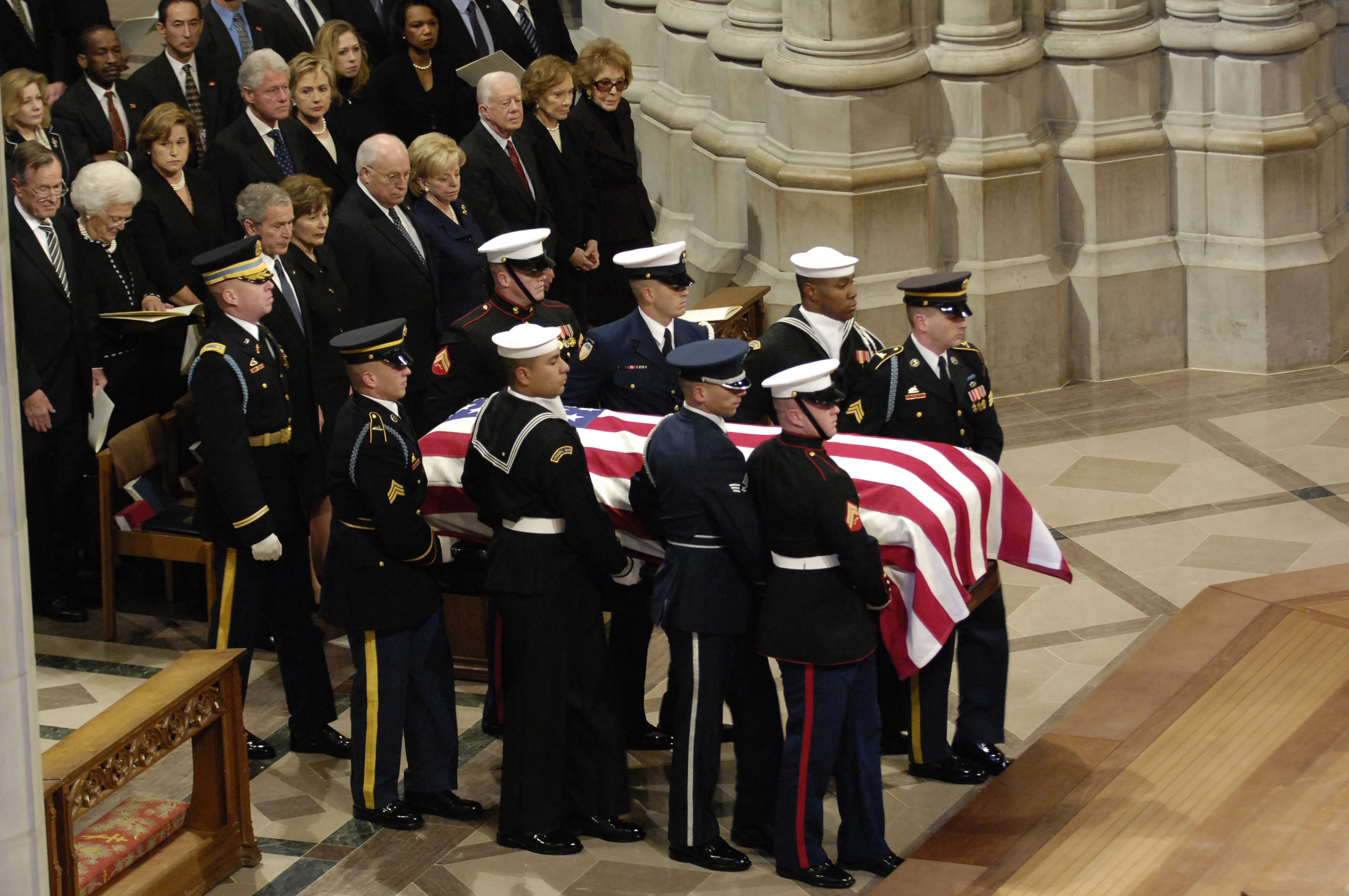
The casket of President Gerald R. Ford is carried past a group that includes President George W. Bush, First Lady Laura Bush and former Presidents George H. W. Bush, Bill Clinton, and Jimmy Carter at the National Cathedral in Washington January 2, 2007.

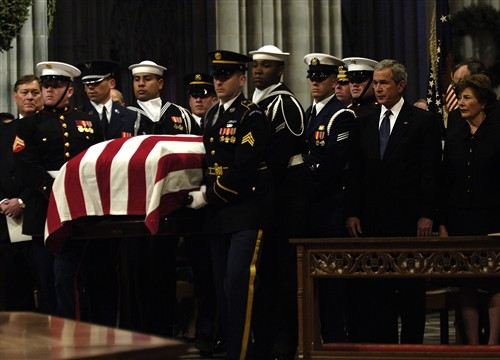
The casket of former President Gerald Ford is carried past President George W. Bush and First Lady Laura Bush during Ford's state funeral at the National Cathedral in Washington, D.C., January 2, 2007.

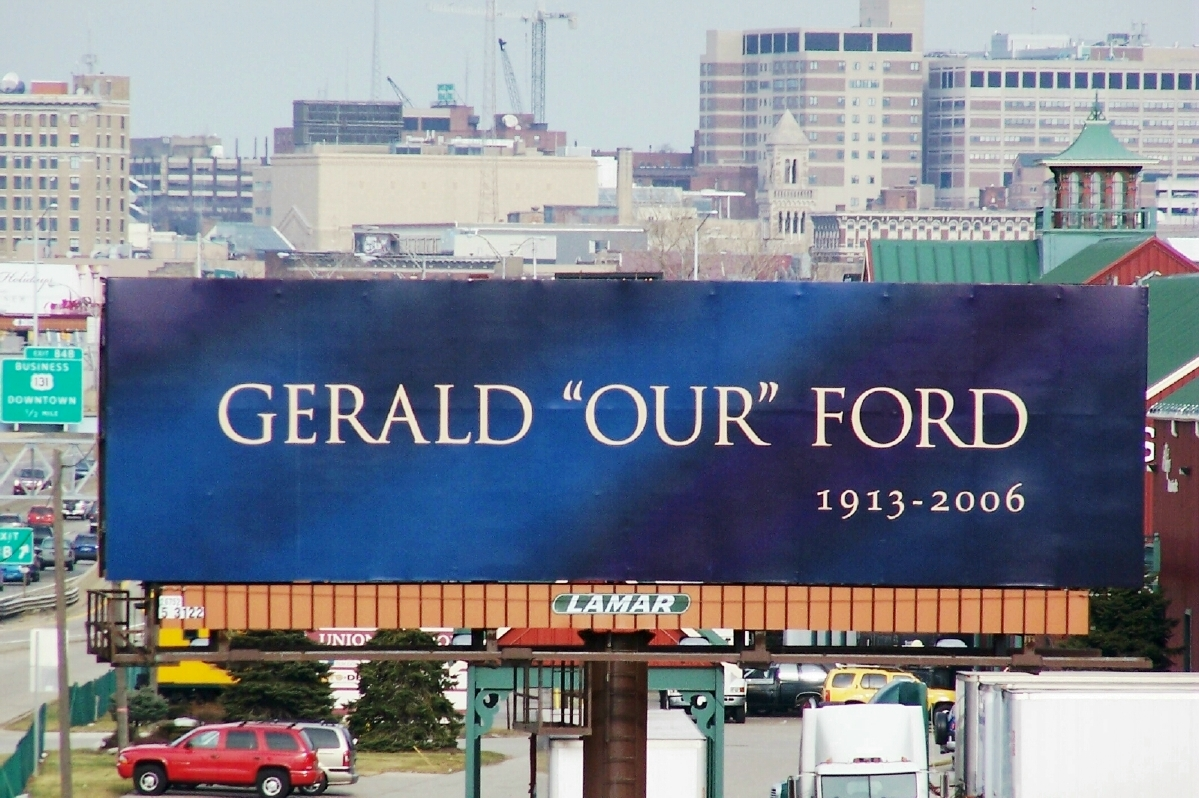
Billboard in Grand Rapids following the death of Gerald R. Ford

== See also ==
- State funerals in the United States
