= Gerald R. Ford Presidential Museum =

Presidential museum for U.S. President Gerald Ford in Grand Rapids, Michigan

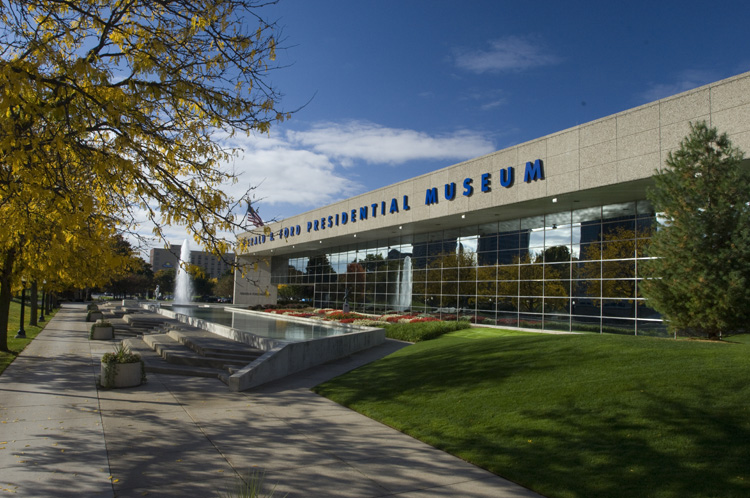
- The Gerald R. Ford Presidential Museum in 2009

- Location within Michigan Location within the United States

General information
- Location: Grand Rapids, Kent County, Michigan, United States
- Coordinates: 42°58′06″N 85°40′39″W
- Named for: Gerald Ford
- Construction started: January 7, 1976; 50 years ago
- Inaugurated: Dedicated on September 18, 1981; 44 years ago
- Cost: $11 million
- Operator: National Archives and Records Administration

Technical details
- Size: 44,000 ft^{2} (4,100 m^{2})

Design and construction
- Architects: Marvin DeWinter Associates; Jordan Sheperd

Website
- fordlibrarymuseum.gov

The Gerald R. Ford Presidential Museum is the presidential museum and burial place of Gerald Ford, the 38th president of the United States (1974–1977), and his wife Betty Ford. It is located near the Pew Campus of Grand Valley State University in Grand Rapids, Michigan. Ford's presidential museum is the only such facility under the auspices of the National Archives and Records Administration to be separate from the presidential library, which is located approximately 130 miles (210 km) to the east in Ann Arbor. Despite the separation, the library and museum are a single institution with one director.

== Gerald Ford ==
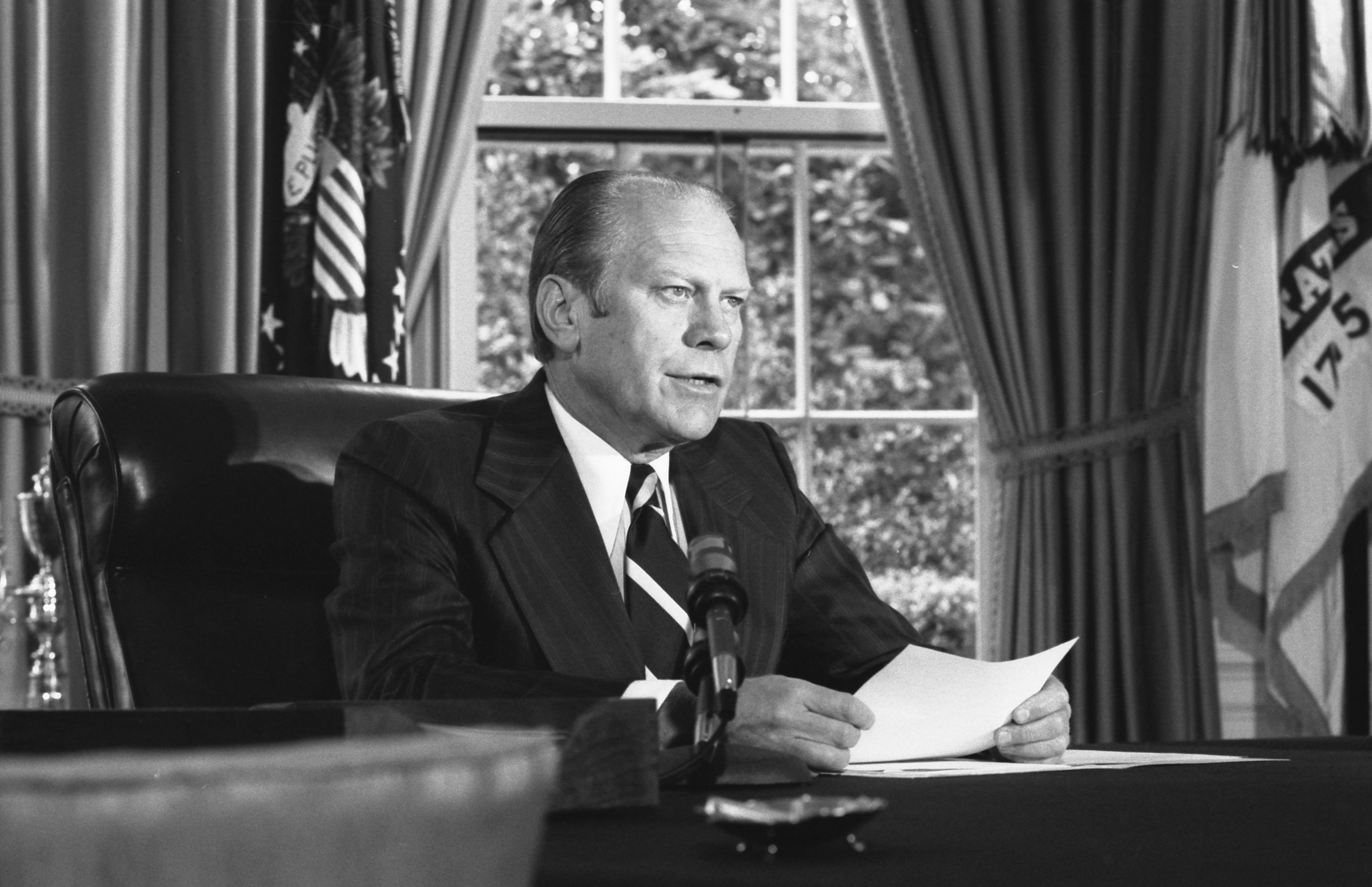
President Ford announcing his pardon of Richard Nixon from the Oval Office. September 8, 1974

Gerald Rudolph Ford, Jr. (born Leslie Lynch King, Jr.) was born on July 14, 1913. Ford served nearly 25 years as a Representative of Michigan's 5th congressional district, eight of them as the Republican Minority Leader. Serving from 1973 to 1974 as the 40th Vice President of the United States, Ford was the first person appointed to the vice-presidency under the terms of the 25th Amendment. He then became President upon Richard Nixon's resignation on August 9, 1974, and served until January 20, 1977 as the 38th President of the United States. Ford is the only President of the United States who was not elected by ballot for his terms as either President or Vice-President.

== Building and dedication of the museum ==
Funds for the construction of the museum were raised from over 14,000 individual donations through the efforts of the Gerald Ford Commemorative Committee, the University of Michigan, the State of Michigan, Kent County, and the City of Grand Rapids.

The 44,000-square-foot (4,100 m^{2}) two-story triangular museum was designed by Marvin DeWinter Associates and built at a cost of $11 million. The museum is located in a 20-acre (8.1 ha) park complex that includes the Grand Rapids Public Museum along the west bank of the Grand River in downtown Grand Rapids. The building was dedicated September 18, 1981, and was attended by Ronald and Nancy Reagan, Mexican president José López Portillo, Canadian prime minister Pierre Trudeau, Japanese minister of foreign affairs Sunao Sonoda, former French president Valéry Giscard d'Estaing, and former secretary of state Henry Kissinger. Bob Hope served as master of ceremonies and part of the festivities were recorded for TV broadcast.

The east side of the structure is enclosed by a 300-foot-wide (91 m) glass wall providing a view of the river and downtown Grand Rapids beyond. The main entrance features a reflecting pool and fountain. The site is linked with downtown hotels and shops by a pedestrian bridge spanning the river.

The core exhibits were redesigned as part of a building expansion completed in 1997 allowing for a broad program of changing feature exhibits and events. Expanded funding from the Gerald R. Ford Foundation supported the expansion and additional programming.

== Exhibits ==
The main floor contains exhibits on President Ford's life and career as President of the United States. Candid photographs of Ford interacting with his family and colleagues provides a personal glimpse of the president. This floor includes a full-scale replica of the Oval Office furnished as it was during Ford's presidency.

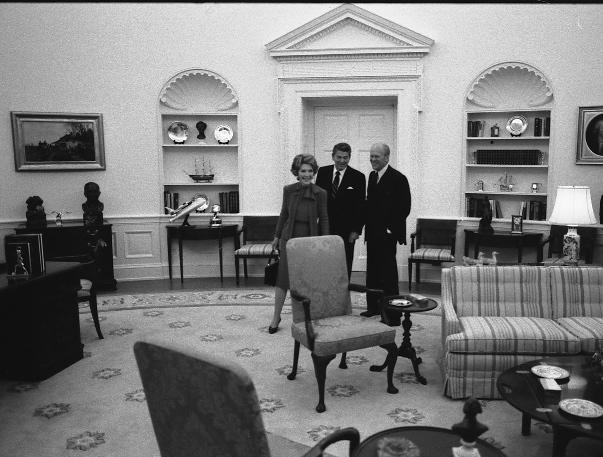
Ford with Ronald and Nancy Reagan in the replica of the Oval Office at the museum, September 17, 1981

Special exhibits highlight the United States Bicentennial celebration in 1976 and Betty Ford's role during her husband's term in office. Other exhibits, which are the core of the museum's program, enable visitors to travel by video with President Ford and Secretary Kissinger to various hot-spots around the globe; take a holographic tour of the Ford White House; and experience a day in the Oval Office through a sound and light show. A Watergate gallery includes a six-minute, multi-screen history beginning with the June 1972 break-in and a display of the actual burglary tools. An interactive Cabinet Room allows visitors to take part in presidential decision making. Visitors can see gifts presented by heads of state and other foreign dignitaries, as well as personal gifts to Ford from the American people. The award-winning film, "A Time To Heal," is shown hourly in the museum auditorium. A section of the Berlin Wall stands in the museum's lobby, which was dedicated by Ford on September 6, 1991.

=== Permanent ===
- Gerald Ford's America: pop culture of the 1970s
- Young Jerry Ford: His formative years to inauguration as vice president
- Constitution in Crisis: The Watergate years
- At Work in the Oval Office: A recreation of the Oval Office during Ford's years as President of the United States
- Leadership in Diplomacy: Ford's foreign trips with Secretary of State Henry Kissinger
- Ford Cabinet Room: A recreation of the Cabinet Room of the Ford Presidency. Videos highlight the pardon of Richard Nixon, the seizure of the SS Mayagüez, and the New York City financial crisis

In addition to the permanent exhibits, a succession of temporary exhibits draws upon the rich holdings of the entire presidential libraries system, the Smithsonian Institution, the National Archives, and others

=== Temporary ===
Along with hosting traveling exhibits from public and private institutions, the museum also develops temporary shows in-house.

== Collections ==
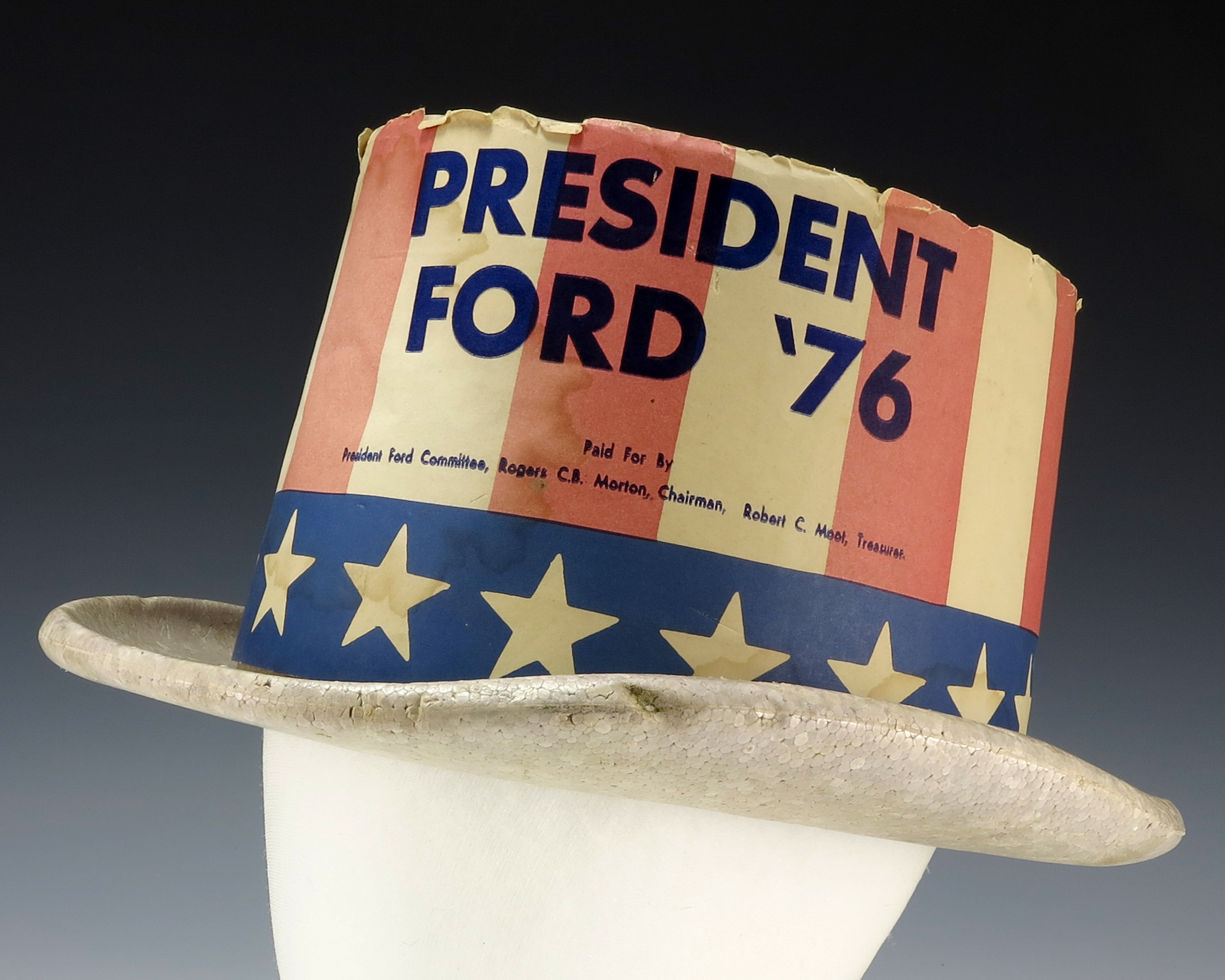
Foam campaign top hat featuring a stars and stripes design and the text "President Ford '76" worn by Gerald R. Ford's delegates during the 1976 Republican National Convention

The museum collections houses approximately 20,000 artifacts from the life and career of President Ford. Mrs. Ford's life is represented as well. Artifacts include Boy Scout materials, head of state gifts, bicentennial materials, re-election campaign materials, and clothing.

== Educational and community programs ==
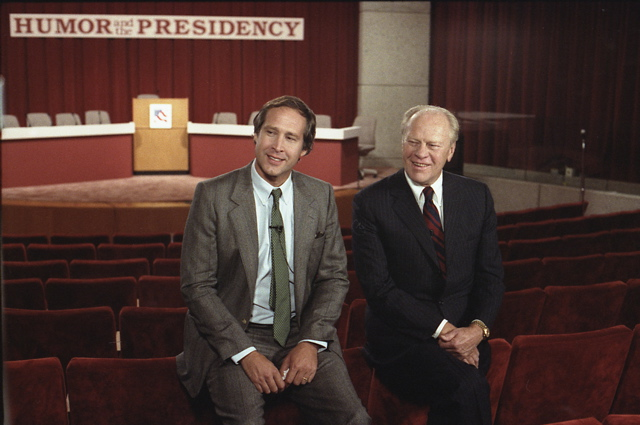
President Ford meeting with comedian Chevy Chase (who portrayed Ford on SNL) prior to the commencement of the Conference on Humor and the Presidency, held at the Gerald R. Ford Museum in 1986

The Gerald R. Ford Presidential Library and Museum are sponsored by the Gerald R. Ford Presidential Foundation whose mission is to support historical exhibits, educational programs, conferences, research grants, and awards. In addition to providing funding for the library and museum, the foundation publishes a semi-annual report of activities, sponsors the William E. Simon Lectures in Public Affairs, awards journalism prizes for excellence in reporting on the presidency and defense issues and awards grants-in-aid of up to $2,000 to researchers who use the Ford Library archival holdings. Another part of the foundation's mission is to honor the principles and values demonstrated by Gerald Ford throughout his public service career.

The museum collaborates with various organizations, including the Ford Presidential Foundation, University of Michigan, and Domestic Policy Association, to host scholarly conferences and community events. Museum staff organizes and hosts many other special events. The museum annually hosts naturalization ceremonies for new citizens and opens the grounds to community festivities and Independence Day fireworks. Other regular programs include the Great Decisions Lecture Series which brings guest speakers on selected foreign policy topics and features audience discussions and completion of "opinion ballots". It maintains an ongoing partnership with the Close Up Foundation and sponsors a Citizens Bee, a competitive exam for high school students with questions focused on history and political affairs. The American Political Film Series annually presents eight motion pictures that frequently deal with highly charged topics for discussion.

== In the media ==
The library was the taping site of a PBS series on The Presidency and the Constitution that aired in 1987. In December 1988, it hosted a gathering of representatives from 44 nations for an All-Democracies Conference. Perhaps the most popular conference sponsored by the library and museum was Humor and the Presidency held at the museum September 17–19, 1986. The conference featured presentations by politicians, well-known comedians, press secretaries, newspaper columnists, and political cartoonists to explore all sides of the topic. President Ford and Chevy Chase appeared on several morning news/talk shows generating wide interest in the event. The conference was taped for later broadcast on HBO.

== The Fords' funerals ==
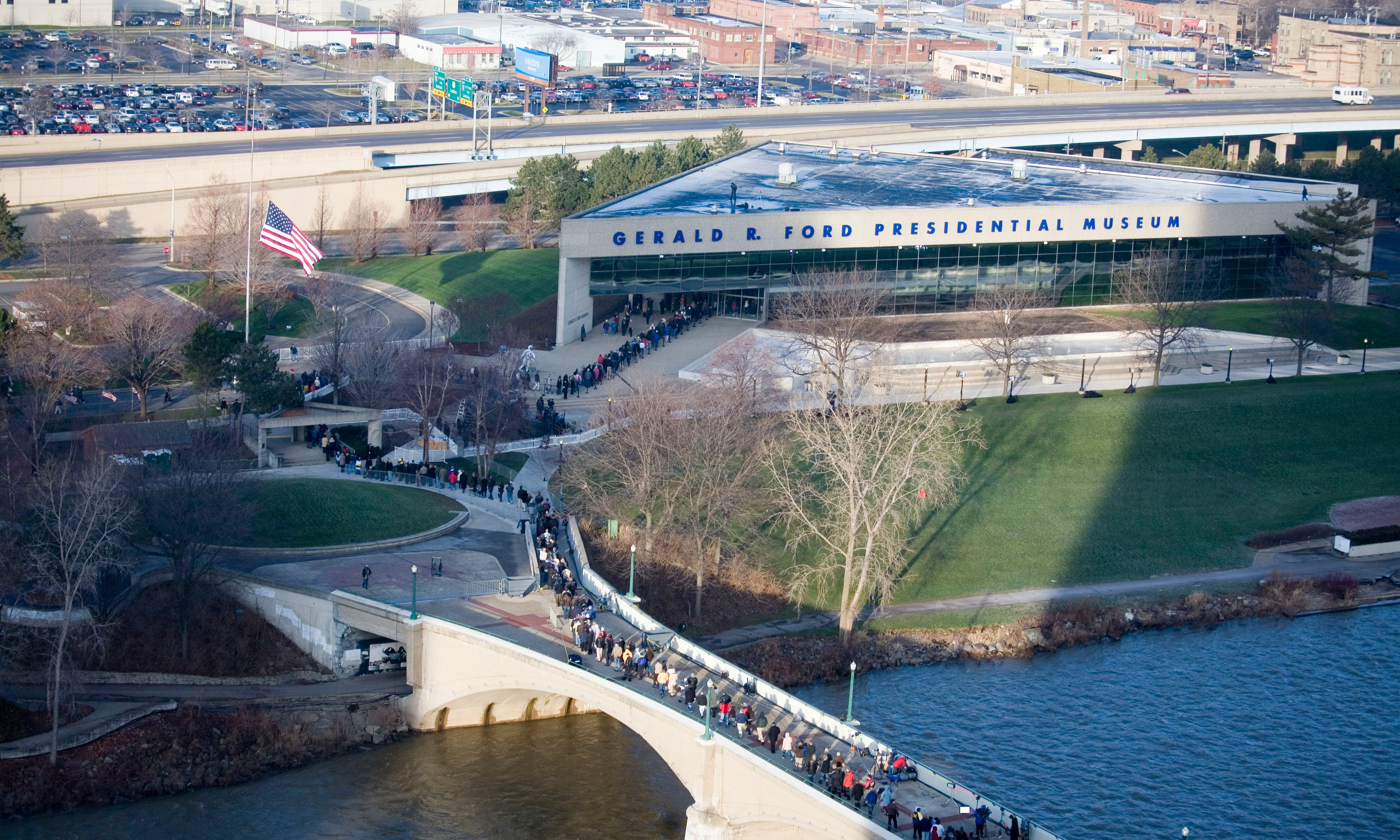
Thousands wait in line to pay their respects to Ford as his casket lay within the museum.

Following Gerald Ford's death on December 26, 2006, thousands of people paid tribute to the president on the grounds of the museum. Visitors created a spontaneous memorial with candles, flags, flowers, and handwritten notes at the Pearl Street entrance. During the night of January 2, 2007, through the morning of January 3, approximately 60,000 people viewed the casket as Ford lay in repose in the museum lobby. On January 3, Ford's body was taken to Grace Episcopal Church in East Grand Rapids for a funeral service. During the service, former President Jimmy Carter, former Defense Secretary Donald Rumsfeld, and historian Richard Norton Smith gave eulogies. Following the service, President Ford was interred on the museum grounds.

After Betty Ford's death on July 8, 2011, the museum closed the following day to prepare for her funeral. Throughout the closure, the lobby remained open for guests to sign a condolence book. Later that day, the Ford family announced that her casket would be returned to Grand Rapids and lie in repose at the museum for public visitation from the evening of July 13 through noon July 14, when a service was held at Grace Episcopal Church. After the service, the casket was returned to the museum for burial next to her husband.

== See also ==
- Presidential memorials in the United States
- List of burial places of presidents and vice presidents of the United States
