= Self Help Africa =

International development charity

- Founded: 1984
- Founder: Noel McDonagh; Fr. Owen Lambert
- Merger of: Gorta (2014)
- Purpose: Improving agriculture and food production, promoting entrepreneurship, supporting women, and climate change adaptation
- Headquarters: Dublin, Ireland
- Location: Kingsbridge House, 17-22 Parkgate Street, Dublin 8
- Origins: Ireland
- Region served: sub-Saharan Africa
- Members: 163
- CEO: Feargal O'Connell
- Chair: Geoff Meagher
- Subsidiaries: Partner Africa, TruTrade, Traidlinks.
- Revenue: €40m annually
- Employees: 890
- Website: selfhelpafrica.org
- Formerly called: Self Help Development International; Harvest Help; Gorta-Self Help Africa (2014-2018); United Purpose

Self Help Africa is an Irish international charity that promotes and implements long-term rural development projects in Africa. Self Help Africa merged with Gorta, in July 2014, and the combined entity was known for a period as Gorta-Self Help Africa. In 2021, the organisation merged with the UK-based international non-governmental organization, United Purpose. The enlarged organisation took the Self Help name. Self Help Africa also owns a number of social enterprise subsidiaries: Cumo Microfinance, TruTrade, and Partner Africa.

The charity works with rural communities in fifteen African countries – supporting farm families to grow more and earn more from their produce. Self Help Africa provides training and technical support to assist households in producing more food, diversifying their crops and incomes, and accessing markets for their surplus produce.

The charity, which has also undertaken development projects in Bangladesh and Brazil, also helps rural communities to access micro-finance services, and supports sustainable agricultural solutions that enable rural farmers to adapt and mitigate the effects of climate change. Self Help Africa works with local partners across its African programmes to support the provision of good quality local seed and planting materials. This work includes assistance to local communities to multiply their own seed, and provision of support for rural groups so that they can get certification for the seed that they produce.

Self Help Africa has its headquarters in Dublin, Ireland, UK offices in Shrewsbury, Belfast, London and American offices in New York and Boston. It is a recipient of funding from Irish Aid, the European Commission, US AID, the United Kingdom Department of Foreign and Overseas Development (DFID), of variety of trusts, foundations, other institutional donors, and the general public. It has three subsidiary companies: an ethical auditing provider, and two trade network promoters.

== History ==
=== Formation ===
Self Help Africa was founded in 1984 when an Irish priest asked Irish farmers to send seed potatoes to famine-affected parts of Ethiopia. It was established by Noel McDonagh and Father Owen Lambert in the immediate aftermath of the 1983–85 famine in Ethiopia.

As of 2007, Raymond Jordan was Chief Executive Officer of Self Help Africa. In mid-2008, Self Help Africa merged with Self Help Development International (SHDI) and the UK agency Harvest Help - both also set up in the wake of African famines in the mid-1980s.

As of 2013, Self Help Africa reported an annual turnover of €9.5million.

=== Merger ===
In 2014, Self Help Africa merged with Gorta, the oldest development organisation in Ireland. Gorta was established in 1965 as 'Gorta: The Freedom from Hunger Council', in response to a call by the Food and Agriculture Organization (FAO) for member countries to raise public awareness and financial support for long-term agricultural development. The word Gorta, meaning "extreme want" or "hunger" in the Irish language, was chosen to reflect both the work of the organisation in combating hunger and to reflect Ireland's own legacy of hardship during the Great Famine known in Irish as An Gorta Mór. Initially set up by the Irish Department of Agriculture and Fisheries, Gorta moved to the remit of the Department of Foreign Affairs in 1979. In 1998, Gorta severed its links with the Irish government to become a completely independent NGO with its head office in Dublin. Gorta remained the Irish affiliate organisation of the FAO. Since the 1960s, Gorta funded small and large-scale agricultural development projects in close to 50 countries across Africa, Asia, South and Central America. In later years, a majority of projects were focused on Sub-Saharan Africa, with the exception of funding for a large-scale rehabilitation centre for differently-able children in Tamil Nadu, India.

The merged organisation became one of the largest non-profit agricultural organisations in Ireland and Britain, and was planned to invest around €19m in projects across Africa during 2014. The merger was reported upon positively by both the Irish media and Dóchas, the umbrella association of Irish Non-Governmental Development Organisations.

Following the merger, the organisation operated in Ireland as 'Gorta-Self Help Africa'. From May 2018, the organisation has operated solely under the Self Help Africa brand.

=== 2010s ===
In 2015, Self Help Africa increased its turnover to more than €18m, and Tom Kitt, a former government minister and former Minister for Overseas Development, succeeded co-chairs Tom Corcoran and Sean Gaule at the helm of the organisation.

Also in 2015, Self Help Africa secured $750,000 from the Bill & Melinda Gates Foundation for a development project in West Africa. During the year the organisation also co-authored a report by NGOs in Ireland on the application of climate-smart agriculture techniques in Africa.

In 2016, Self Help Africa increased its turnover to more than €18.7m, rising to over €20m in 2017.

A multi-media story-telling project, won an award from Ireland's NGO representative body Dochas in 2017, for its accounts of the lives of people living in Northern Zambia over a period of years. Also in 2017, a cashless trading platform designed for farmers in sub-Saharan Africa, and developed by Self Help Africa subsidiary social enterprise TruTrade received an innovation award from MIT. Also in 2017, Self Help Africa took over the operations of Irish-based trade development NGO, Traidlinks.

In 2018, Self Help Africa's social enterprise subsidiary won the annual Dóchas award for innovation, while its annual report was short-listed at the Ireland Good Governance Awards and by the Leinster Institute of Chartered Accountants. Self Help Africa also concluded a merger with "War on Want Northern Ireland" in 2018, and formally launched a new branch – Self Help Africa NI at City Hall, Belfast, in March 2018.

The president of the Irish Farmers' Association, Joe Healy, visited Self Help Africa projects in Ethiopia and Kenya and reaffirmed Self Help Africa as the chosen charity of the IFA.

=== 2020s ===
Self Help Africa responded to the coronavirus pandemic by providing personal protective equipment to vulnerable communities in several project countries during 2020. In Spring, the organisation embarked on a public campaign to plant 'One Million Trees' in Africa during the year. Supported by yogurt brand Glenisk, the campaign was also supported by the Irish National Teachers Organisation (INTO) and by the Gaelic Athletic Association's Gaelic Players Association (GPA).

In Autumn 2020 Self Help Africa was one of the six founding member agencies of the Irish humanitarian response consortium the Irish Emergency Alliance which ran its first campaign to support communities in the Global South vulnerable to the pandemic.

In 2021, United Purpose merged with Self Help Africa.

Former CEO, Ray Jordan, left the organisation in late 2022. In April 2023, Feargal O'Connell became CEO of Self Help Africa.

The charity closed all of its shops in Northern Ireland in 2025.

== Campaigns and initiatives ==
In 2011, a campaign, titled "Change Her Life", was mounted by Self Help Africa that sought to lobby funding agencies and donors to provide support to Africa's women farmers. Also in 2011, a promotional video produced by Self Help Africa, "It starts with a seed", was selected as the Best Video entry in the Gates Foundation's "Answering the Challenge" competition.

In 2012, Self Help Africa were the beneficiaries of a trans-Asian 'Silk Roads to Shanghai' expedition that took Irishmen Maghnus Collins Smyth and David Burns overland across a distance of 18,000 km from Istanbul to Shanghai - by bike, run and raft. The expedition took the participants ten months to complete, and succeeded in raising close to €50,000 to support the charity's work in Africa. Also in 2012-2013, Self Help Africa extended its work to Benin, and established Partner Africa. Self Help Africa was also involved in the creation of the African Agriculture Alliance.

=== World Food Day ===
From October 1981, Gorta hosted an annual conference in Dublin to mark the FAO's World Food Day. Each year a separate theme was selected by the FAO and Gorta invited personalities and experts to present and lead discussions based around that theme. Notable past speakers included Bob Geldof, Mary Robinson, Father Niall O'Brien and Olivier de Schutter (UN Special Rapporteur on the Right to Food).

== Programmes in Africa ==
=== 20th century ===
Gorta's work initially involved support for both small and large-scale agricultural development projects. The first such project, in 1965, was the establishment of a village settlement and farmers’ training school in rural Tanzania. During the 20th century, Gorta's approach to the issue of hunger evolved. Initial support focused on providing inputs in the form of improved seeds, livestock, machinery or infrastructure, to projects run by missionary groups or Irish volunteers. The very first volunteer was John Hay, who worked on a livestock project in Southern India in 1967.

As the growth in indigenous development organisations increased in number and technical capacity, Gorta's model in the early 1990s shifted away from sending Irish volunteers and supporting missionary groups to working alongside local experts and partner NGO groups within the countries themselves. With the shift in who Gorta was working with also came a move away from the model of providing inputs to a more comprehensive approach to modern development. Focusing on maximising the potential of hard-pressed communities through skills exchange and the encouragement of innovation and entrepreneurship.

=== 21st century ===
Self Help Africa collaborates with government agencies and local partner non-governmental organisations (NGOs) on programmes in Ethiopia, Malawi, Kenya, Uganda, Zambia, Togo and Burkina Faso. It has a presence in Goma in Eastern Democratic Republic of Congo and in Bujumbura, Burundi from where it runs a number of agri-trade development projects. It has also worked in Eritrea, Ghana and Benin.

Other projects carried out by Self Help Africa include a cassava development project in Kenya that was backed by the European Union, and two challenge funds – AgriFI Kenya Challenge Fund and ENTERPRISE Zambia, which provided investment match-funding to agri-businesses in these two countries. AgriFI Kenya, backed by the European Union and Slovak Aid, was funded to disburse €18M in funding to create jobs and markets for small-holder farmers, while ENTERPRISE Zambia was backed by the EU to disburse €24M in grant funding.

Self Help Africa are founder members of the Irish Forum for International Agricultural Development (IFIAD). Its members include the Irish farm advisory service Teagasc, the Irish Department of Agriculture, Irish Farmers Association and other NGOs.

A subsidiary of Self Help Africa, Partner Africa based in Nairobi, Kenya, was established in 2012 to support ethical and socially responsible business practice.

== Funding ==
As of 2013, Gorta's work in Africa was funded largely through public donors in Ireland and the UK, in addition to money raised through sponsored events, annual campaigns, and by revenue generated by a network of charity shops in the Republic of Ireland. The first Gorta charity shop, known initially as the 'Gorta Gift Shop' opened on South Frederick Street in Dublin in 1970. In July 2014, Gorta opened its 11th shop in Newcastle West, Limerick. In 2014, Gorta's "Just a Little Extra" fundraising campaign won an award for Acorn Marketing at the An Post Smart Marketing Awards in the Smartest Fundraising/Not for Profit category.

As of 2022, Self Help Africa was in receipt of approximately €6 million in funding from the Irish state.
