= Irish Forum for International Agricultural Development =

Self Help Africa
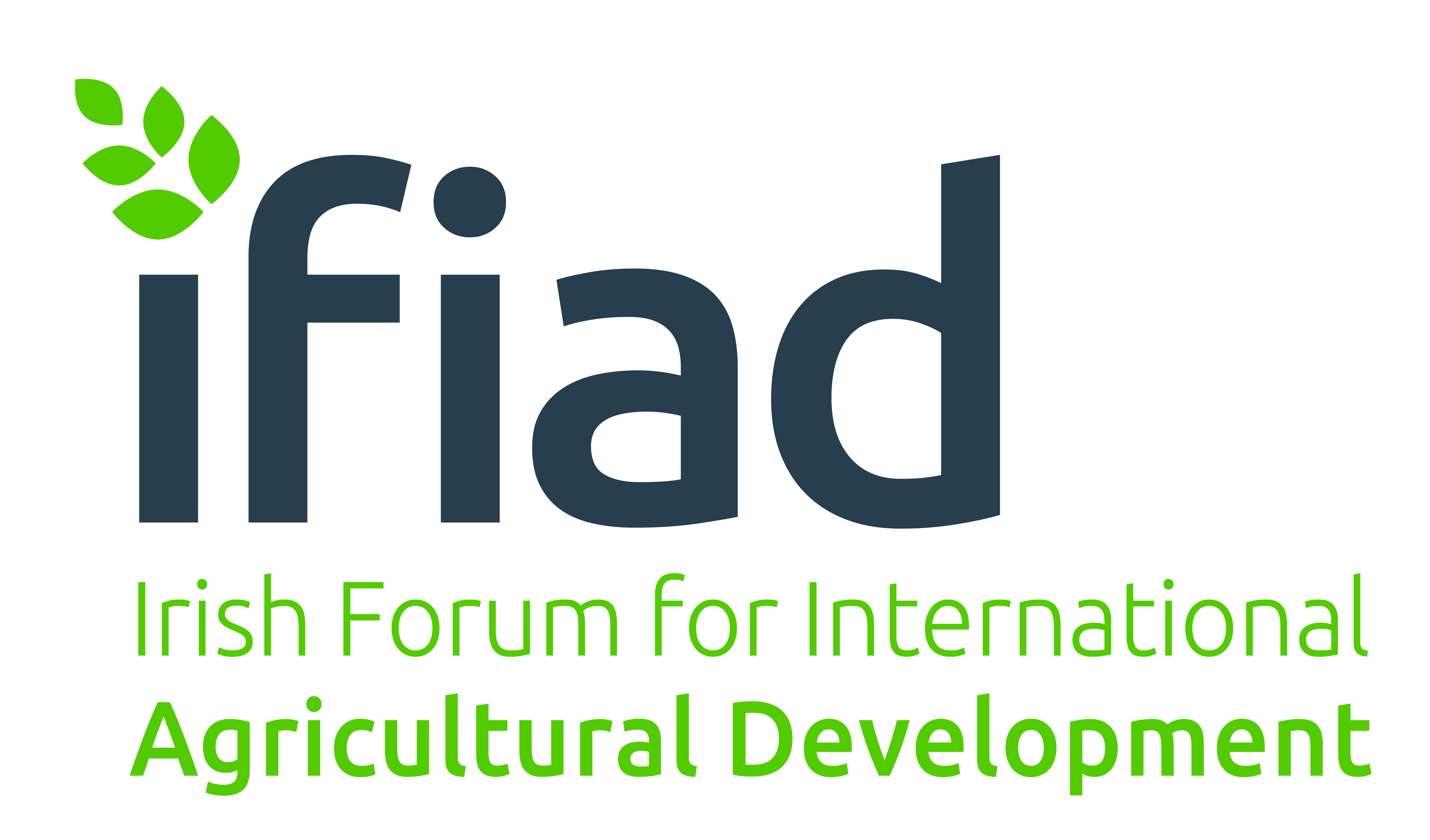
- Founded: 2016
- Location: Kingsbridge House, 17-22 Parkgate Street, Dublin 8
- Origins: Dublin, Ireland
- Region served: Ireland; Developing Countries
- Members: Irish Aid, Irish Dept of Agriculture, Food and the Marine, Self Help Africa, Trocaire, Vita, Concern Worldwide, Misean Cara, Teagasc, Sustainable Food Systems Ireland, University of Galway, University College Dublin, University College Cork
- Key people: Prof. Charles Spillane, (IFIAD Chair); Patrice Lucid (IFIAD Coordinator)
- Website: ifiad.ie

The Irish Forum for International Agricultural Development (IFIAD) was established in early 2016 as a platform to share knowledge and good practices in agriculture for the benefit of international development.

The organisation has "sought to harness Ireland's knowledge in the agri-food sector for the benefit of overseas agricultural development programming and policy, and as a means of supporting Ireland’s development objectives". IFIAD was launched by then Minister of State for the Diaspora and Overseas Development Aid, Joe McHugh. It brings together representatives from the agri-food, agricultural research and the international development sectors.

Founder members included Self Help Africa, Vita, Misean Cara, University of Galway, Teagasc, Irish Aid, the Department of Agriculture, Food and the Marine, Concern Worldwide and Trócaire.

IFIAD's vision is to "transform the livelihoods of people living in poverty in the developing world through initiatives that support resilient sustainable agriculture, and increase food and nutrition security".

IFIAD has hosted conferences to mark UN World Food Day since its inception. For instance, in 2017, its conference looked at the topic of One Health, the inter-connectivity of plant, animal, human and environmental health.
