= United Purpose =

Non-governmental organization

United Purpose, formerly known as Concern Universal, is an international development and emergency relief organization that works in a number of the poorest countries of the world to assist in finding local, sustainable solutions to poverty and inequality. In 2021, United Purpose merged with Self Help Africa, and in 2022 the organisation agreed that it would trade as Self Help Africa. Concern Universal was created by Father Raymond Kennedy and a group of volunteers who had been working in developing countries during the late 1960s and early 1970s. The organization was officially established in January 1976 and, as of 2018, has approximately 600 employees. Influences on the founding members included the first-hand experiences of the suffering they saw and social movements that encouraged engagement in the struggles of the poor. United Purpose aims to work in conjunction with struggling nations to challenge local poverty and inequality. Their vision is a world where "justice, dignity, and respect prevail for all". The organization aims to end poverty and inequality by "enabling people to improve their lives for the long term by providing them with access to resources they need". They also work to "challenge the dependency culture" and provide practical local application of Sustainable Development Goals. The organization headquarters are currently located in the United Kingdom.

== History ==
According to the United Purpose website, after 40 years of establishment United Purpose has assisted with moving 35 million people out of poverty. They registered to work in Malawi in 1989. Since then, United Purpose has established offices in Malawi, Mozambique, Ghana, Guinea, Nigeria, Senegal, Gambia, Bangladesh, and Brazil. They also continually work on projects with local partners in Cameroon, Ethiopia, Kenya, Zambia, India and the Caribbean.

The work of United Purpose is not strictly based in one specific sector. In the years 1997–2000, while working under the name Concern Universal, the company participated in a study involving soil fertility in Central Malawi. In this study, Concern Universal provided legume seeds to participating farmers in Malawi. The organization also introduced the clay stove and created 65 stove manufacturing groups within Malawi to assist with district development.

In December 2014, United Purpose's National AIDS Coordinator, Mphatso Magwaya, was in Malawi with the goal of enhancing public awareness on the growing number of people being diagnosed with AIDS/HIV. Magwaya's spoke to a crowd at the Mvimbo Headquarters in Ntcheu about the need for testing and counseling for expecting women in the area.

United Purpose has worked with other charitable organizations to reach the maximum number of people possible. BeOnePercent.org has worked with United Purpose since 2015 and has conducted five separate campaigns to raise money for assistance for areas in need. Their most recent campaign, in July 2017, was their largest with 211 members donating £4795.90 (USD $6830.31).

=== Founder ===
Father Raymond Kennedy was born on January 22, 1926, in Palo Alto, California, and died on November 3, 2004, at age 78. Kennedy was a humanitarian who worked tirelessly in the poorest countries of the world to help provide assistance in many ways he could. In 1970 after the war ended, he worked alongside his brother John and his wife Kay as a founder of the organization, Africa Concern. It eventually grew into a global concern organization where the three founders, as well as thousands of unpaid volunteers, provided assistance wherever they could.

In 1976, Kennedy developed Concern Universal in Britain and left the Africa Concern organization to his brother and wife. But, it wasn't until 1987 that he became an active member of Concern Universal because he was highly involved with his new membership of the Holy Ghost Fathers. Kennedy was ordained to the priesthood in Rome in 1951 and served for 36 years as a member of the Holy Ghost Fathers Congregation in Ireland, Nigeria, and Bangladesh.

=== Irrigation systems in Malawi ===
Malawi is predominantly an agricultural country, with farming production accounting for 90% of its foreign exchange. Irrigation farming needed to be renovated and new technologies needed to be implemented in order to keep up with need. By the early 1980s, nearly sixteen irrigation systems were constructed, two of which were in the Lake Chilwa basin at Likangala and Domasi.

Concern Universal was highly involved with the irrigation system installations in Domasi, Malawi. They provided water, sanitation, and other mechanical services to farmers in Malawi. Two different irrigation methods were implemented and farmers were able to select which they preferred to use permanently.

The Domasi Water User Association (DWUA) was also established during this time by a group of farmers who were to assume control of the water resource management structure after the construction was completed. After the creation of this group, Concern Universal trained farmers on the operational factors having to do with management and the physical rehabilitation of canals, bridges and roads.

In January 2002, Concern Universal assisted farmers in creating a formal guide of operations for the DWUA. Unfortunately, the process continued slower than expected because farmers failed to attend the meetings organized by Concern Universal. Farmers found the timing of meetings inconvenient with the important farming and agricultural work that needed to be completed. While this frustrated farmers, members from Concern Universal also grew frustrated because of the ongoing traveling back and forth from Balaka in Southern Malawi where they were staying. Eventually, the guide was ratified in January 2003.

=== Maize productivity in Malawi ===
Farmers in Chisepo and Bembeke, Malawi, were given legume seed of their choice provided by Concern Universal. The farmers were then able to plant the seeds as sole crops, intercrops or in rotation with maize in farmer-led trials.

Concern Universal and World Vision International, another NGO, participated in the conducting on the trials. Sets of experiments were conducted by farming communities with the goal of evaluating released and pre-released seeds under farmer-managed conditions. The trials were maintained in a Mother-Baby scenario. For each Mother trial, there were as many as 6-12 corresponding Baby trials within walking distance. All Baby trials contain portions of the seeds from the Mother. Often Baby trials consisted of beans and soyabean seed that Concern Universal distributed through the community feedback initiative. The Mother trials were designed by researchers within the study groups to evaluate a proper area for optimal growth conditions. Ultimately, a local individual will manage the Mother trials.

Through these research trials conducted in Malawi, farmers were able to educate themselves on a variety of seeds and the proper development and nurturing of them through the season. This also helped to eliminate the seeds that did not grow well so that farmers are aware of what will grow in the soil they already have near them when they go to market. Through Concern Universal's assistance in providing these resources, Malawi seed companies were able to choose to multiply hybrid seed packs that would best benefit them.

=== Gambia is Good partnership ===
Gambia is Good was established by Haygrove, a UK-based horticultural company, and Concern Universal, a non-governmental organization, in 2003 to develop sustainable lives among those living in The Gambia who have experienced poor quality of crop growth and seasonal flooding. The partnership's efforts addressed need specific demands for enhancing the tourist industry within the area in regard to hotels, restaurants, and supermarkets. In 2007, Gambia is Good diverted £34,000 ($48,713.74 USD) of its sales from imports to local producers in Gambia. Gambia is Good, began as a strategic collaboration but evolved to consider fundamental questions about the nature of business and development in regard to Corporate Social Responsibility (CSR). Data was collected for this study through interviews held by Haygrove in conjunction with participant observation conducted by Concern Universal.

Haygrove and Concern Universal aimed to influence others by example through their partnership agreement. While Concern Universal, an NGO, seeks to drive social change, companies do not usually have the same mentality. This partnership challenged the traditional system of NGO vs CSR business models and defined the nature of sustainable development.

=== Concern Universal becomes United Purpose ===
In November 2016, representatives from Concern Universal met with members of International Inspiration, a sports development charity, to discuss a merger of the two organizations. During this meeting, Concern Universal representatives introduced a new organizational strategy for delivering assistance within the NGO sector. During this merge, Ben Jackson, chief executive of bond, was promoted to "global director of innovations and partnerships". During this time, portions of the Concern Universal staff will relocate from London, United Kingdom to Wales to have easier access to merge partners.

To celebrate their 40th anniversary, Concern Universal created a video commemorating the organization's forty years of accomplishments and to formally introduce their new brand to the world. The video utilizes archived footage and current footage to create a short film showing the growth of the organization through the past and into the future.

Concern Universal created a new brand identity changing the name to United Purpose on February 9, 2017, in Lilongwe, Malawi. They announced this change at an event held with representatives from Malawi government, including Water Development and Food Security Bob Chilemba, as well as United Purpose staff members. United Purpose has provided assistance to Malawi for several years in 17 of their districts. Their main source of aid has been the introduction of stove production groups to Malawi to assist in achieving the goal of 2 million cleaner cookstoves by 2020. Chilemba says Malawi plans to continue working alongside the organization throughout their brand change.

Along with a new organization name, a new motto was also announced at the event by Country Director, Heather Campbell. The new motto, "Up and out of poverty", summarizes the organization's focus on development, innovation, and independence.

== Examples of work ==
- Establishing safe water points in Malawi
- Training village water user associations to maintain and manage these in Malawi, Kenya, Nigeria, and Bangladesh
- Providing emergency humanitarian relief to victims of conflict and famine in Guinea and Malawi
- Adult literacy and basic education training for children and adolescents in Colombia, Brazil, and Bangladesh
- Supporting children at risk and promoting child rights in Brazil, Colombia, and Bangladesh
- Developing water and sanitation improvement strategies in Kenya and Nigeria
- Creating 65 cookstove manufacturing groups in Malawi
- Participated in a soil fertility study in Central Malawi
- Provided wood for Chikwati during a fuelwood shortage
