= Episcopal Relief & Development =

Anglican charitable organization

- Founded: 1940
- Type: International Relief and Development Agency
- Location: 815 Second Avenue, New York, NY 10017
- Origins: The Episcopal Church
- Region served: Global
- Method: Asset Based Community Development
- Key people: Rob Radtke, President; Neel Lane, Chairman of the Board
- Website: www.episcopalrelief.org

Episcopal Relief & Development is an international relief and development agency of the Episcopal Church. It was established in 1940 as the Presiding Bishop's Fund for World Relief. Episcopal Relief and Development works in approximately 40 countries in Africa, Asia, Latin America, the Caribbean, North America, and the Middle East. They build partnerships with local Episcopal and Anglican dioceses and related organizations based on need, capacity and available resources. In 2024, it claimed total revenue of $29,802,695, total giving of $14,168,945, and total assets of $37,696,238.

== Program Areas ==
Episcopal Relief and Development works with church partners to rebuild after disasters and empower people to create lasting solutions that fight poverty, hunger and disease. Working in close to 40 countries, their programs impact the lives of approximately 3 million people. Their international development programs seek to mobilize local resources and expertise toward sustainable, community-led programs that address poverty, hunger, and disease.

The four core program areas are:

- Alleviate hunger and improve food supply
- Create economic opportunities and strengthen communities
- Promote health and fight disease
- Respond to disasters and rebuild communities

Starting in 2012, Episcopal Relief and Development introduced Asset-Based Community Development. This model of development uses the gifts and talents that people already possess, while facilitating solutions rather than directing them. The method produces sustainable community-driven solutions. Episcopal Relief and Development staff conduct regular monitoring visits to all program sites.

Sustainable Development Goals, an initiative of the United Nations, is a set of goals which build on the work of the Millennium Development Goals. They target a range of development issues such as poverty, hunger, disease, gender inequality, and access to clean water and sanitation. Inspired by these global goals, all of Episcopal Relief and Development's international development programs seek to mobilize local resources and expertise toward sustainable, community-led programs that address poverty, hunger, and disease.

== History ==
Originally called the Presiding Bishop's Fund for World Relief (the PB Fund), the organization was established in 1940 by the Episcopal Church. Its initial mission was to assist refugees fleeing Europe during World War II. Soon after the war, the agency's efforts expanded to include additional humanitarian assistance, focusing mostly on disaster relief.

With increased funding in the 1960s and 1970s, the PB Fund increased its operational capacity and expanding programming to incorporate sustainable development. In the 1980s, major fundraising initiatives supported responses to famine in Ethiopia, an earthquake in Mexico, and a volcano eruption in Colombia. Later that decade, the Episcopal Migration Ministry was developed, funded out of the PB fund to meet the growing needs of refugee ministries, allowing the fund to focus on long-term development work.

After Hurricane Mitch in 1998, the PB Fund undertook disaster relief work in Honduras that focused on integrated community development. Over four years, an entire community was constructed, with 200 houses, a school, a clinic and a church. Micro-finance activities and agricultural projects were launched to create economic opportunities and improve food supply. The combination of rebuilding and development through micro-finance and other initiatives helped spur economic growth in the devastated region. This integrated approach became a core element of the agency's disaster relief work.

In 2000, the PB Fund was renamed Episcopal Relief and Development to emphasize its disaster relief work and its increased programmatic focus on integrated community development. Two years later, Episcopal Relief and Development was incorporated as an independent, 501(c)(3) organization. In 2003, the board of directors decided to shift from administering small grants for domestic and overseas projects to implementing long-term development programs and partnerships. The organization formally endorsed the Millennium Development Goals, eight benchmarks developed by the international community to reduce extreme global poverty by 2015. In 2004, the agency worked in 21 countries, reaching nearly 250,000 people annually. As of 2015, Episcopal Relief and Development is working with close to 3 million people each year in approximately 40 countries.

In 2004 and 2005, Episcopal Relief and Development undertook large-scale disaster responses to the 2004 Indian Ocean earthquake and tsunami and Hurricane Katrina. NetsforLife, a program partnership to fight malaria in sub-Saharan Africa, began as a pilot in 2006 and was established in a growing number of countries. Since 2010, the US disaster program has expanded through the Disaster Preparedness Initiative to support and equip Episcopal Church leaders to prepare for and respond to disasters in their communities.

Episcopal Relief and Development partnered with the Episcopal Diocese of Haiti to offer immediate aid to those affected by the 2010 Haiti earthquake. In the initial years following the quake, the agency provided emergency relief in the form of food, medicine, and assistance in finding shelter for those who lost their homes. The organization has since shifted to long-term sanitation, shelter provision and employment creation programs, assisting more than 40,000 people in 2011 alone. Episcopal Relief and Development collaborates with World Health, Idjen, and the Bishop Tharp Business and Technology Institute to foster activities in education, business development and micro-credit.

2014–15 marked Episcopal Relief and Development's 75th anniversary. Elements of the celebration included a traveling photo exhibition, the 75 Stories Project, and fundraising campaigns.

Episcopal Relief and Development began a Hurricane Harvey Response Fund to provide support for communities affected by Hurricane Harvey, which made landfall in Texas on August 26, 2017, where more than 185,000 homes were damaged and 9,000 destroyed. One of the immediate ways Episcopal Relief & Development and its partners help individuals is by handing out gift cards to local stores so that people can choose what they need the most.
