= Moline =

Moline may refer to:

== Places in the United States ==
- Moline, Illinois, the largest city of that name in the United States
  - East Moline, Illinois, a city
- Moline Township, Rock Island County, Illinois
- Moline, Kansas
- Moline, Michigan, an unincorporated community
- Moline, Ohio, an unincorporated community

== People ==
- Charles Moline (1863–1927), Anglo-Austrian businessman and cricketer
- Edgar Moline (1855–1943), Anglo-Austrian cricketer
- Georganne Moline (born 1990), American hurdler
- Jack Moline (born 1952), American Conservative rabbi
- Matt Moline, ex-husband of Kathy Griffin
- Pierre-Louis Moline (c. 1740–1820), French dramatist, poet and librettist
- Robert Moline (1889-1979), Australian Anglican bishop and Archbishop of Perth

== Other uses ==
- Moline Automobile Company (1904–1919), American automobile manufacturer in Moline, Illinois
- Moline Plow Company, a former American manufacturer of plows and other farm implements based in Moline, Illinois
- Moline High School, Moline, Illinois
- Moline station, a proposed train station in Moline, Illinois
- Moline Plowboys, a primary name of the minor league baseball teams based in Moline, Illinois
- Moline Universal Tractors, an independent American football team that played in 1920
- Cross moline of heraldry
- Ulmus americana 'Moline', a cultivar of the American Elm

== See also ==
- Minneapolis-Moline, a tractor company
