= Molina =

Molina or La Molina may refer to:

== People ==
- Molina (surname)

== Places ==
=== Chile ===
- Molina, Chile, a town and municipality in Curicó Province, Chile

=== Italy ===
- Castelletto Molina, a municipality in the Province of Asti, Piedmont region
- Castello-Molina di Fiemme, a municipality in the Province of Trento, Trentino-Alto Adige/Südtirol region
- Molina (Pecetto di Valenza), a hamlet forming part of the commune of Pecetto di Valenza, in the Province of Asti, Piedmont region
- A civil parish of the municipality of Vietri sul Mare (SA)
- Molina Aterno, a town in the Province of L’Aquila in the Abruzzo region of Italy
- Molina di Ledro, a former municipality in the Province of Trento, Trentino-Alto Adige/Südtirol region

=== Peru ===
- La Molina District, a district of Lima Province, Peru

=== Spain ===
- La Molina (ski resort), a ski resort in Catalonia
- Molina de Aragón, a municipality in the province of Guadalajara
- Molina de Segura, a municipality in the province of Murcia
- Taifa of Molina, a mediaeval kingdom under Muslim control that existed from around the 1080s to 1100

=== Switzerland ===
- Molina, Switzerland, in the municipality of Buseno, Grisons

=== United States ===
- Molina, Colorado, United States, an unincorporated town

== Institutions ==
- Moisés E. Molina High School, Dallas, Texas, United States
- Molina's Cantina, a Tex-Mex restaurant in Houston, Texas
- La Molina National Agrarian University (Universidad Nacional Agraria La Molina), Lima, Peru

== Arts and entertainment ==
- Molina's Culpa, a 1993 Cuban short film that pioneered the blood and gore genre in Cuba
- "Molina", a song by Creedence Clearwater Revival on the 1970 album Pendulum
- Molina, an upcoming film in development by The Walt Disney Company

== Other uses ==
- Molina, a common name for the plant Dysopsis glechomoides
- Molina's hog-nosed skunk (Conepatus chinga), a South American skunk species
- Molina Healthcare, an American managed care company
- Ballester–Molina, semi-automatic pistol, Argentina, introduced 1938

== See also ==
- Malena (disambiguation)
- Malina (disambiguation)
- Melena
- Melina (disambiguation)
- Milena (disambiguation)
- Milina, Serbia
- Molena, Georgia, United States
- Moline (disambiguation)
- Molinism
- Molniya (disambiguation)
