= Melina =

Melina may refer to:

- Melina (given name), including a list of people with the name
- "Melina", a No.1 hit song by Camilo Sesto 1975
- "Melina", a song by Tapani Kansa
- Melina, Dobretići, a village in Bosnia and Herzegovina
- An alternative spelling of Gmelina, a species of trees

== See also ==
- Melena, a kind of feces
- Milina, a Serbian village
- Molena, Georgia
- Malena (disambiguation)
- Malina (disambiguation)
- Malina (disambiguation)
- Molina (disambiguation)
