= Milena =

Milena may refer to:

- Milena (skipper), a genus of skippers in the family Hesperiidae
- Milena, Sicily, a comune in Italy
- Milena (given name), a Slavic feminine name
- Milena (film), a 1991 French biographical film about Czech writer Milena Jesenská

== See also ==
- Mileena, a video game character
- Malena (disambiguation)
- Molina (disambiguation)
- Malina (disambiguation)
- Melena
- Melina (disambiguation)
- Milina
- Molena
