= Milina =

Milina may refer to:

- Milina, Serbia, a village near Loznica
- Milina, a village near Pelion in Thessaly, Greece
- Antoni Milina (born 1989), Croatian football player
- Jure Milina (born 1987), Croatian football player
