= Melina (given name) =

- Pronunciation: /məˈliːnə/
- Gender: Female

Origin
- Language: Greek
- Meaning: honey

Other names
- Related names: Malina, Malena, Melena

Melina is a feminine given name of Greek origin, derived from the word "méli", which means "honey".

Notable people with the name include:

- Melina Almodóvar, Puerto Rican salsa singer, songwriter, dancer, and entertainer
- Melina Andersson, Swedish canoeist
- Melina Bath, Australian politician
- Melina Delú, Argentinian politician
- Melina Džinović, Serbian fashion designer
- Melina Georgousakis, Australian scientist and founder of Franklin Women
- Melina Giorgi, Argentinian politician
- Melina Gomba, South African Member of Parliament
- Melina Havelock, fictional character in James Bond
- Melina Kanakaredes, Greek-American actress
- Melina Laboucan-Massimo, Cree/Canadian climate justice advocate
- Melina León, Puerto Rican merengue singer and actress
- Melina Marchetta, Australian author
- Melina Matsoukas, American director
- Melina Mercouri, Greek actress, singer, and politician
- Melina Perez, American professional wrestler
- Melina Teno, Brazilian water polo player
- Melina Turk, Canadian squash player
- Melina Markkanen, Finnish microbiology researcher
