= Malina (given name) =

Malina is a female given name. It may refer to:

- Malina (Bulgarian singer) (born 1967), Bulgarian singer
- Malina Joshi (born 1989), Nepali actress
- Malina Moye (born 1984), American singer-songwriter
- Malina Popivanova (1902–1954), Macedonian communist
- Malina Suliman (born 1990), Afghan artist
- Malina Weissman (born 2003), American actress and model

== See also ==
- Malina (surname)
- Mălina (name), Romanian given name
