= La Molina =

La Molina may refer to:

- La Molina (ski resort), ski resort in Catalonia, Spain
- La Molina District, district of Lima Province, Peru

== See also ==
- Molina (disambiguation)
