= Malena =

Malena may refer to:

== People ==
=== Professional name ===
- Maléna (singer) (born 2007), Armenian singer

=== Given name ===
- Malena Ernman (born 1970), Swedish opera singer
- Malena Alterio (born 1974), Argentine-born Spanish actress
- Malena Josephsen (born 1977), Faroese football midfielder
- Malena Cano (also known as La Perla), ranchero music and mariachi singer
- Malena Burke (born 1958), Cuban singer
- Malena Belafonte, Danish fashion model turned singer, performer
- Malena Watrous, American novelist
- Malena Mörling (born 1965) Swedish-American poet and translator
- Malena Gracia (born 1971), Spanish actress, singer, and TV presenter
- Malena (pornstar) (born 1983), pseudonym of Filomena Mastromarino, a politician, pornstar, and contestant on L'Isola dei Famosi 12
- Malena Nunes (born 1995), Brazilian YouTuber

=== Surname ===
- Ben Malena (born 1992), Canadian football player
- Marion Malena, American Samoan beauty pageant winner
- Lena Malena, actress in the 1928 American drama film Tropic Madness

== Music ==
- "Malena" (tango), a 1941 tango song
- Malèna (soundtrack), a soundtrack of the 2000 film Malèna
  - "Malena", a song from the soundtrack by Ennio Morricone and recorded on Paradiso
- "Malena", a song by Dolly Parton and sung with Porter Wagoner on the 1969 album Always, Always
- "Malena", a song by the Yugoslavian rock groups Videosex and Idoli from the EP VIS Idoli

== Other ==
- Malèna (film), a 2000 film directed by Giuseppe Tornatore
- Malena (stork)

== See also ==
- Marlene (disambiguation)
- Milena (disambiguation)
- Molina (disambiguation)
- Malina (disambiguation)
- Melena
- Melina (disambiguation)
- Milina, Serbia
- Molena, Georgia, United States
