= BF Avery =

American tractor manufacturer

BF Avery was an American manufacturer of agricultural machinery known for its line of tractors. The company began in 1825 with the manufacturing of plows before shifting to tractors in the late 1930s. The company was purchased by Minneapolis-Moline in 1951, and the line of tractors was discontinued in 1955.

== History ==
Benjamin Franklin Avery began manufacturing plows in Clarksville, Virginia, in 1825. The business moved to Louisville, Kentucky in 1847. In 1863, Avery re-formed the company with his children, renaming it BF Avery and Sons. During this time, the company released cast iron and steel plows, as well as released a semi-monthly magazine, called Home and Farm. In 1865, following Avery's death, the business was passed to his three sons. Production shifted to tractors in the 1930s. In 1951, the BF Avery company was purchased by Minneapolis-Moline tractor company. In 1955, Minneapolis-Moline shut down the Louisville plant, discontinuing the Avery line of tractors.

== Products ==
In 1930, Avery designed a tractor and contracted with Cletrac to produce it. In February 1942, Avery moved production of the tractor to its own facilities. The tractor was relaunched as the BF Avery Model A in 1943, being sold simultaneously as the Cletrac GG and the Montgomery Ward Twin-Row. It featured a singular front wheel. Avery later released the smaller Model V in 1946, and the larger Model R in 1950.

Under Minneapolis-Moline, the Model A was discontinued and the Model R was renamed to the BF. The Model V was the only tractor to be released under both companies' names.
