= Twin City tractors =

Tractor manufacturers of the United States

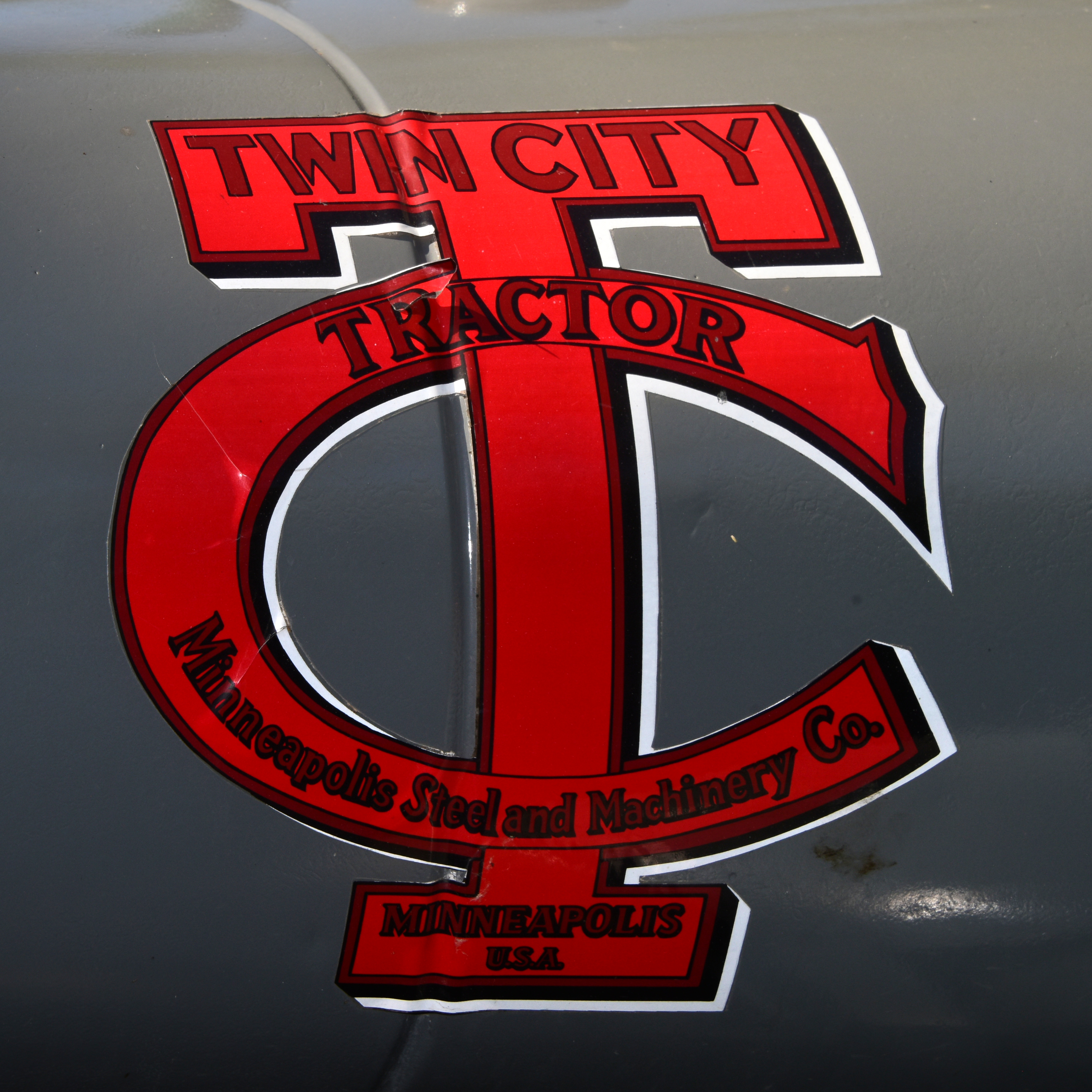
Minneapolis Steel & Machinery Company Twin City

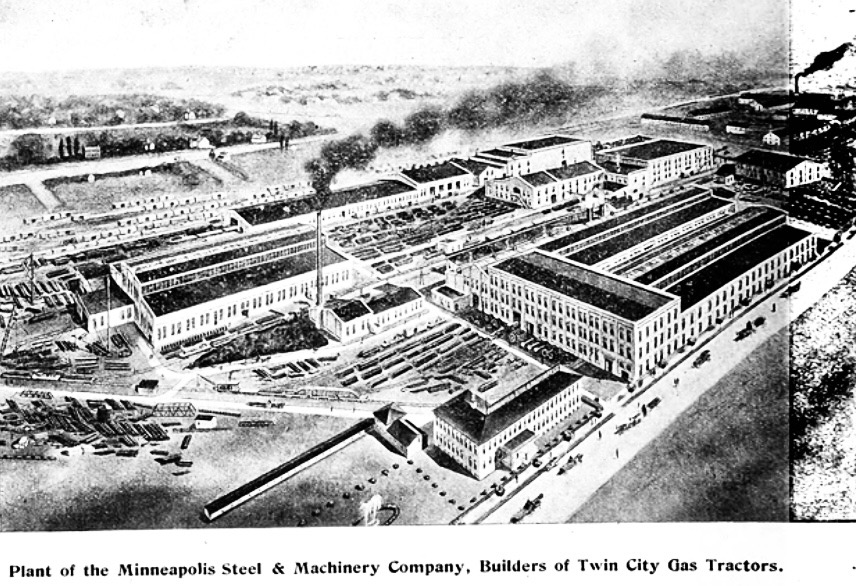
Minneapolis Steel & Machinery Company plant of the Twin City Tractors (1911)

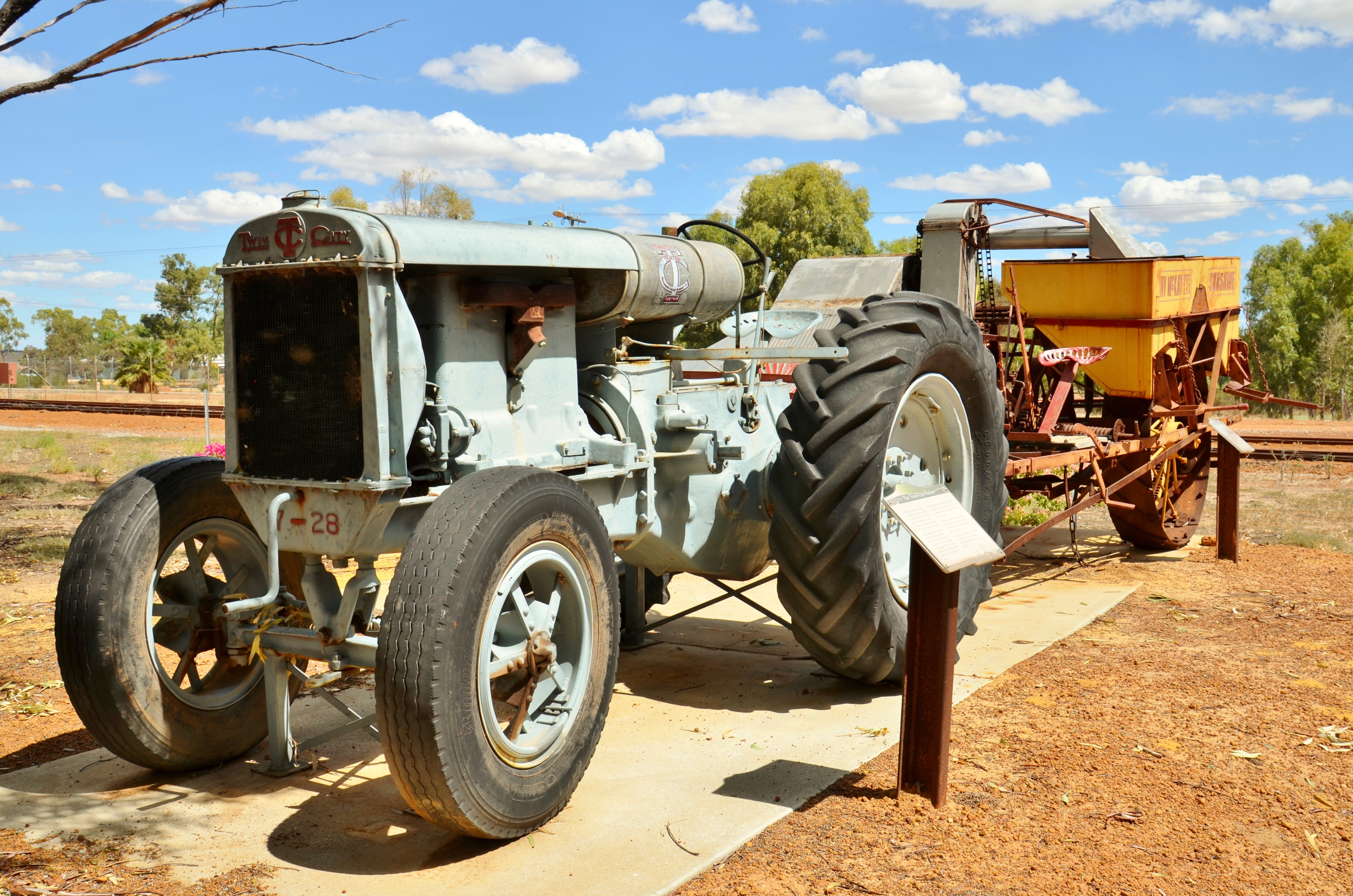
Twin City 17-28 (1919-1929)

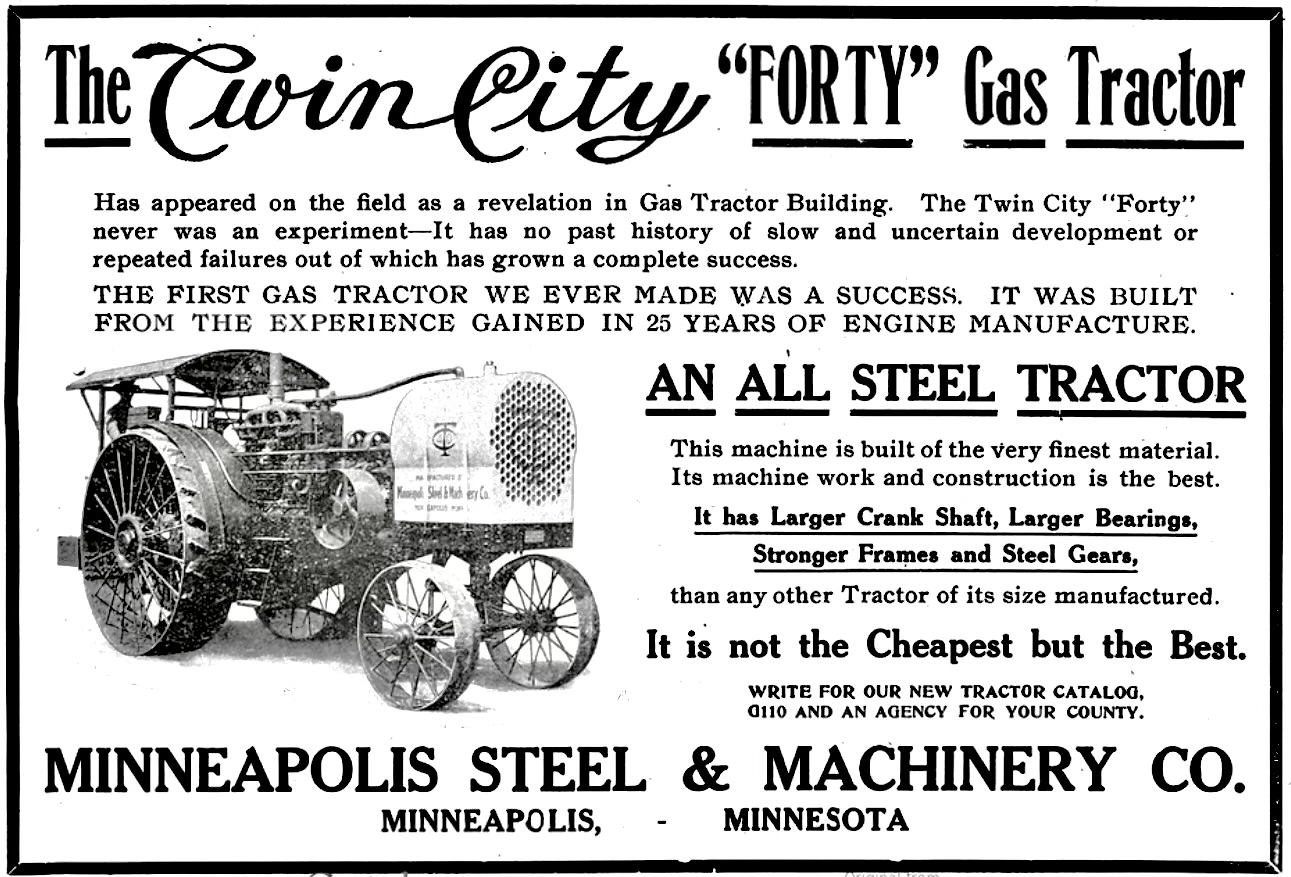
Twin City 40 (1911)

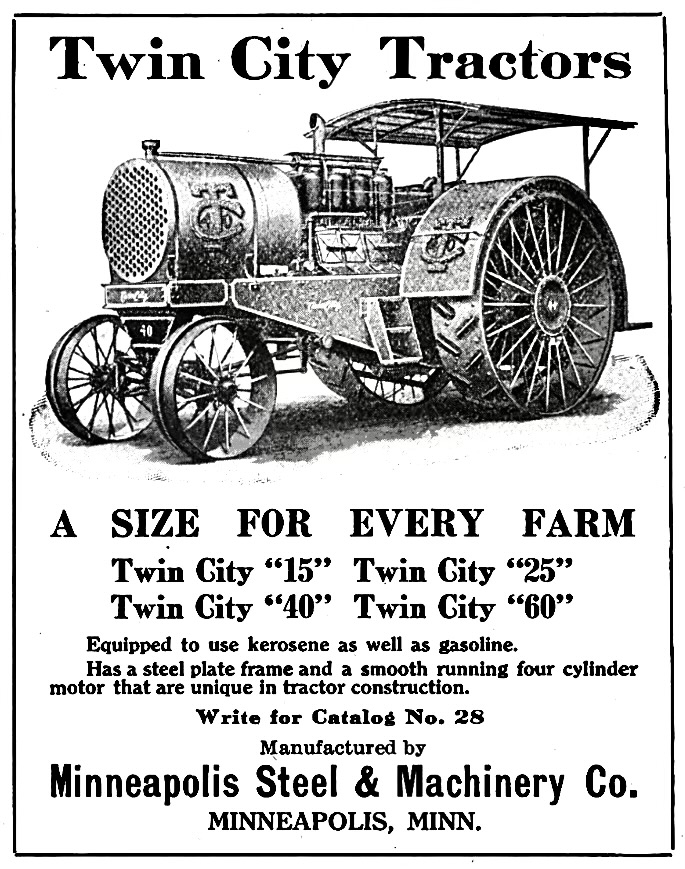
Twin City advertisement (1914)

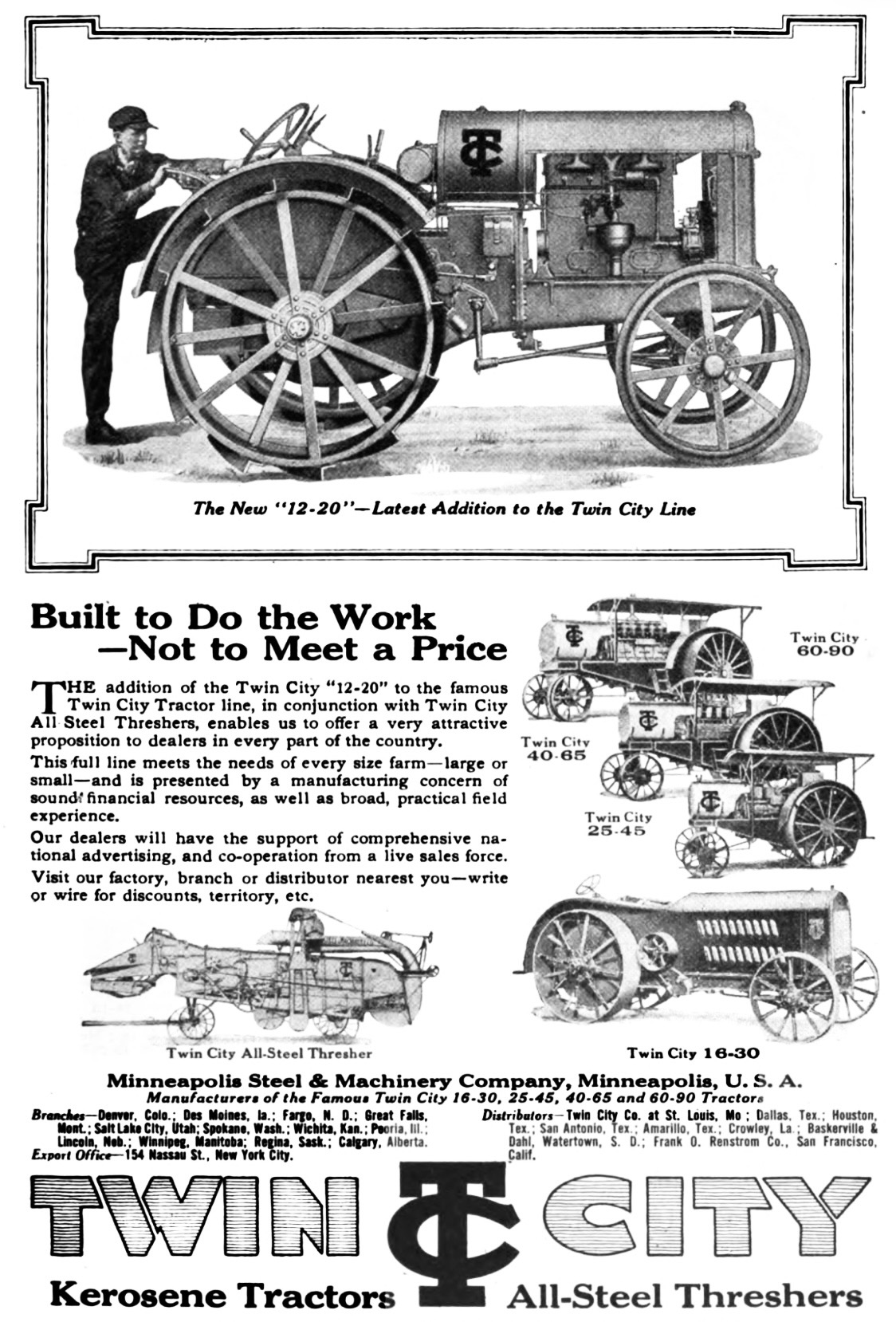
Twin City advertisement (1919)

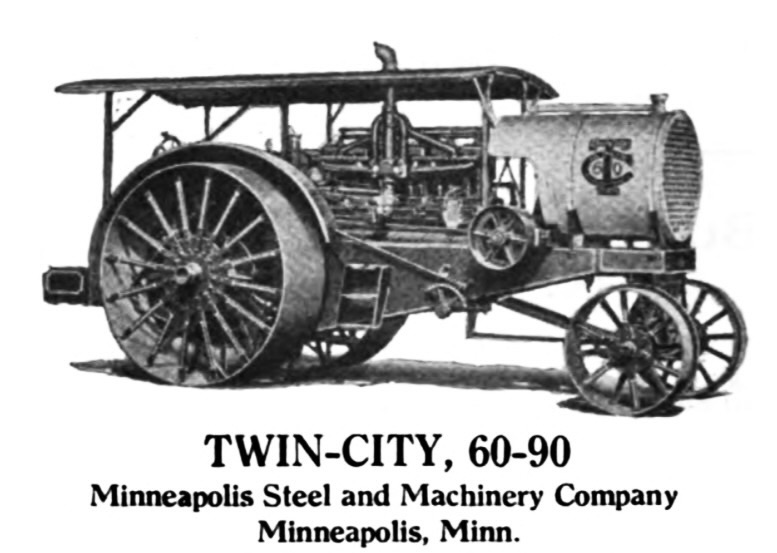
Twin City 60-90 (1916-1920)

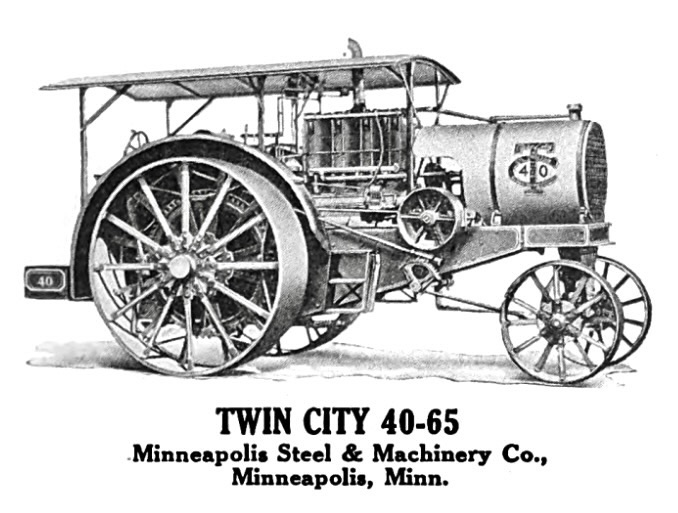
Twin City 40-65 (1916-1925)

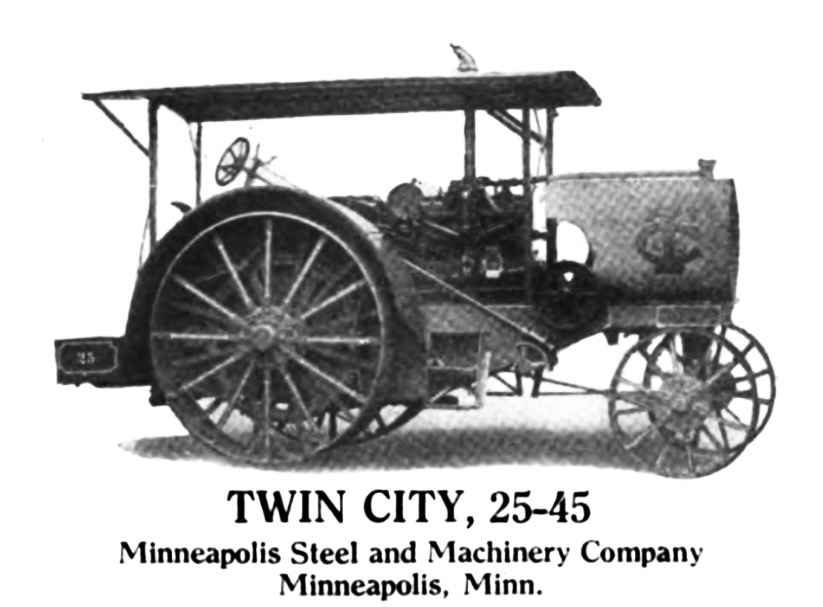
Twin City 25-45 (1916-1920)

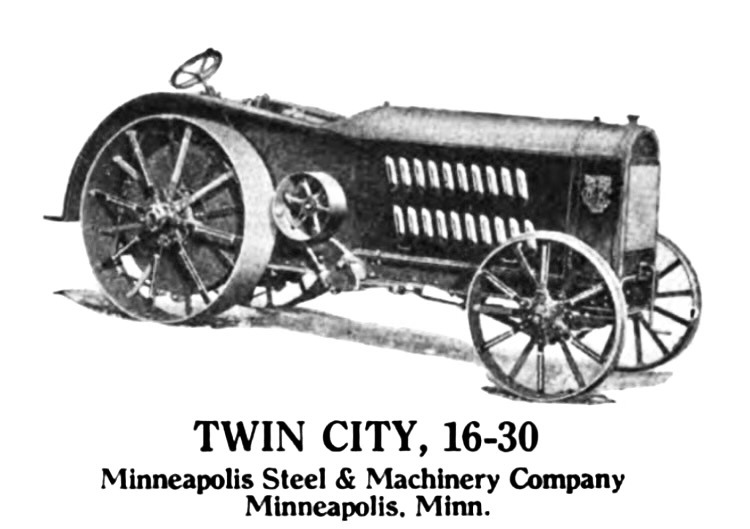
Twin City 16-30 (1918-1920)

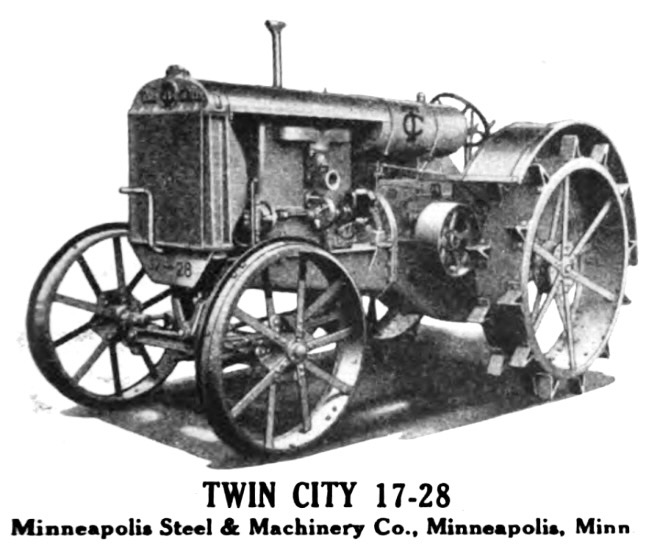
Twin City 17-28 (1919-1929)

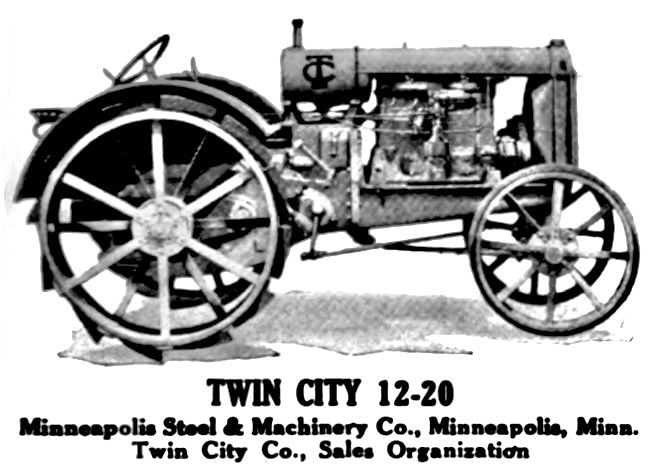
Twin City 12-20 (1919-1926)

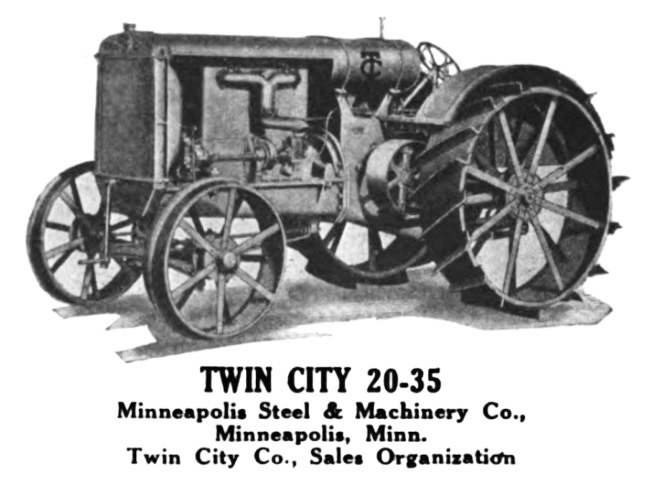
Twin City 20-35 (1920-1927)

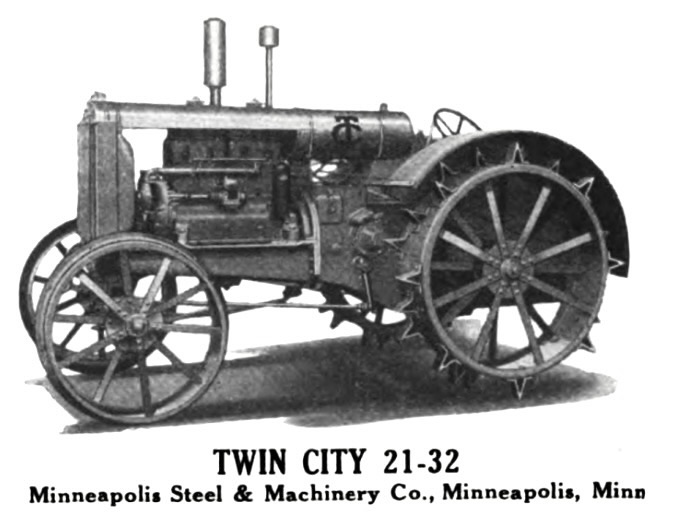
Twin City 21-32 (1928-1929)

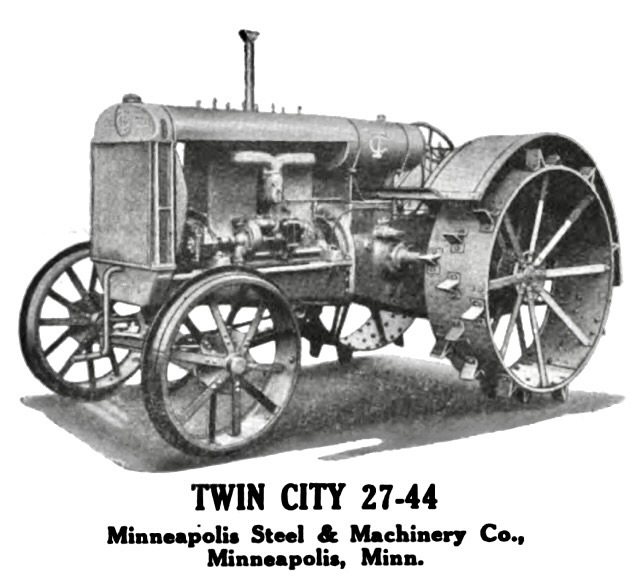
Twin City 27-44 (1919-1929)

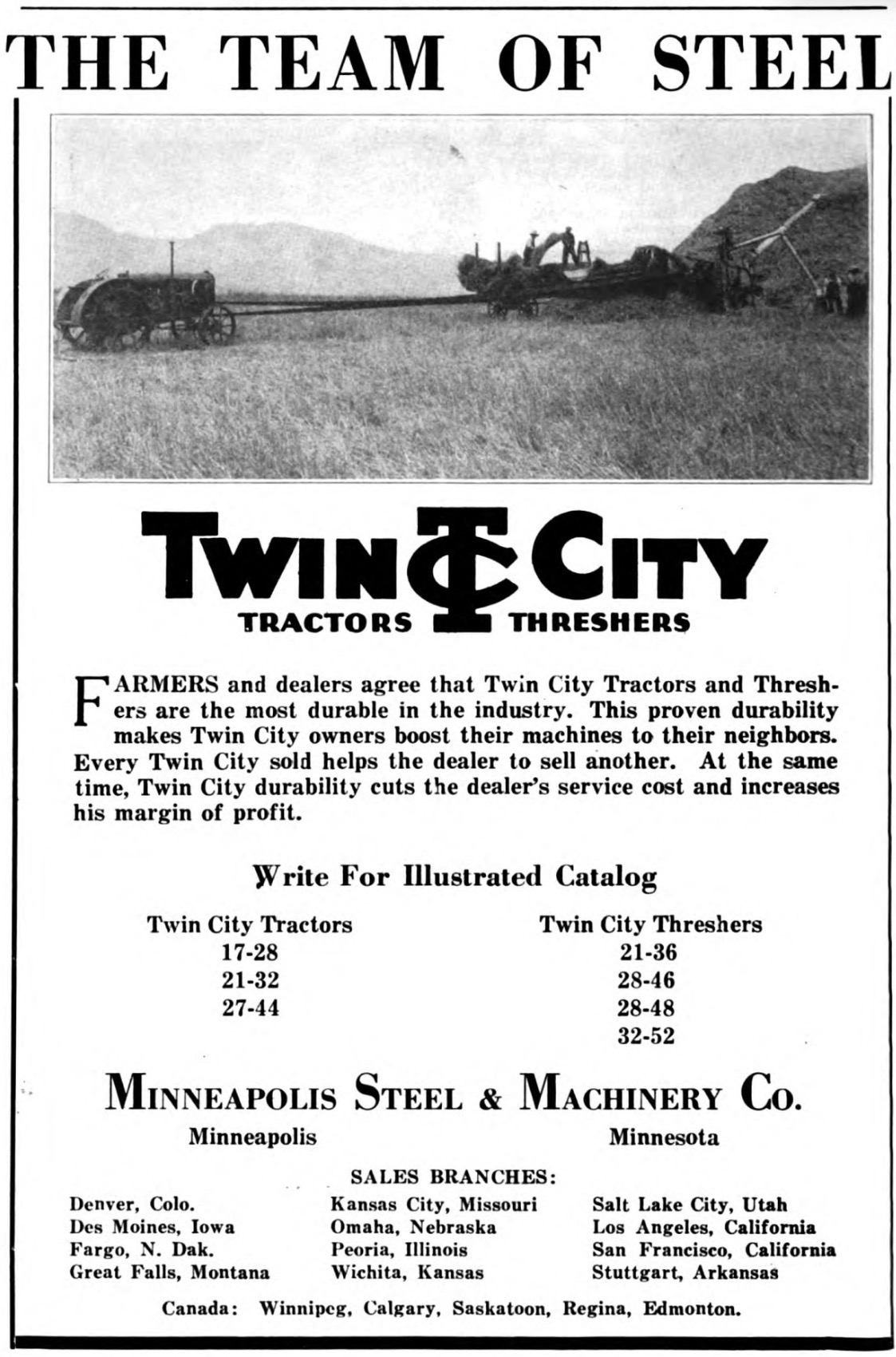
Twin City advertisement (1929)

Twin City tractors were built by the Minneapolis Steel & Machinery Company until 1929 when it merged with the Moline Implement Company of Illinois and the Minneapolis Threshing Machine Company of Hopkins, Minnesota.

In 1918, Twin City produced its first truck in the 3,5-ton class. The truck's engine came from Buda. A two-ton truck followed. The 3.5-tonner had the model designation AW, the 2-tonner BW. In 1923, a few buses were also made. The bus for 25 passengers had the model designation DW.

Twin City tractors were dark gray in color, and had a logo much like the "TC" that the Minnesota Twins baseball club uses. The following is a list of all the models of Twin City tractors made by the Minneapolis Steel & Machinery Company and the specifications for each model according to the Nebraska test reports.

Year	Production	Model
1886		Twin City Corless Steam Engine
1911		40
1912		20, 40
1913		
1914		15, 25, 40, 60
1915		
1916		40-65, 25-45, 60-90
1917		40-65, 25-45, 60-90
1918		40-65, 16-30, 25-45, 60-90, 3,5 to truck AW, BW
1919		40-65, 17-28, 27-44, 12-20, 16-30, 25-45, 60-90, AW, BW
1920		40-65, 17-28, 27-44, 12-20, 20-35, 16-30, 25-45, 60-90, AW, BW
1921		40-65, 17-28, 27-44, 12-20, 20-35, AW, BW
1922		40-65, 17-28, 27-44, 12-20, 20-35, AW, BW
1923		40-65, 17-28, 27-44, 12-20, 20-35, AW, BW
1924		40-65, 17-28, 27-44, 12-20, 20-35, AW, BW
1925		40-65, 17-28, 27-44, 12-20, 20-35
1926		17-28, 27-44, 12-20, 20-35
1927		17-28, 27-44, 20-35
1928	~ 4,500	17-28, 27-44, 21-32
1929		17-28, 27-44, 21-32

== Twin City 12-20 ==
- Manufacturer......................................Minneapolis Steel & Machinery Co., Minneapolis, MN
- Nebraska test number.................................19
- Test date............................................June 3-June 12, 1920
- Test tractor serial number...........................12278
- Years produced.......................................1919-1926
- Serial number range..................................10201-19903
- Serial number location...............................brass plate left side front of transmission Number
- Produced......................................approximately 9700
- Engine...............................................Minneapolis Steel vertical, valve-in-head
- Test engine serial number............................12137
- Cylinders............................................4
- Bore and stroke (inches).............................4.25x6.00
- Rated rpm............................................1,000
- Displacement (c.i)...................................340.5
- Fuel.................................................kerosene/gasoline
- Main tank capacity (gallons).........................23
- Auxiliary tank capacity (gallons)....................3
- Carburetor...........................................Holley, 1.25-in.
- Air cleaner..........................................Bennett
- Ignition.............................................Bosch DU4 magneto
- Cooling capacity (gallons)...........................7

=== Maximum brake horsepower tests ===
- PTO/belt horsepower..................................27.93
- Crankshaft rpm.......................................1,017
- Fuel use (gallons per hour)..........................3.18

=== Maximum drawbar horsepower tests ===
- Gear.................................................low
- Drawbar horsepower...................................18.43
- Pull weight (pounds).................................3,476
- Speed (miles per hour)...............................1.99
- Percent slippage.....................................20.10
- SAE drawbar horsepower...............................12
- SAE belt/PTO horsepower..............................20
- Type.................................................4 wheel
- Front wheel (inches).................................steel 34x5.75
- Rear wheel (inches)..................................steel 50x12
- Length (inches)......................................84 wheel, 134 total
- Height (inches)......................................63.50
- Rear width (inches)..................................63
- Weight (pounds)......................................4,000
- Gear/speed (miles per hour)..........................forward 1/2.20, 2/2.93 reverse1/na

== See also ==
- List of tractor manufacturers
- tractor
