= Minneapolis-Moline =

Tractor company

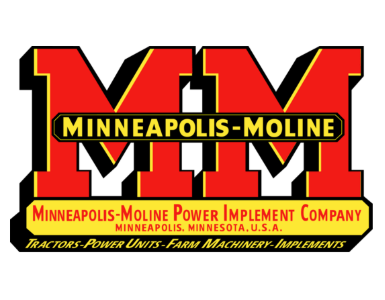
- Founded: 1929
- Defunct: 1974
- Fate: Discontinued
- Successor: White Motor Corporation
- Products: Tractors

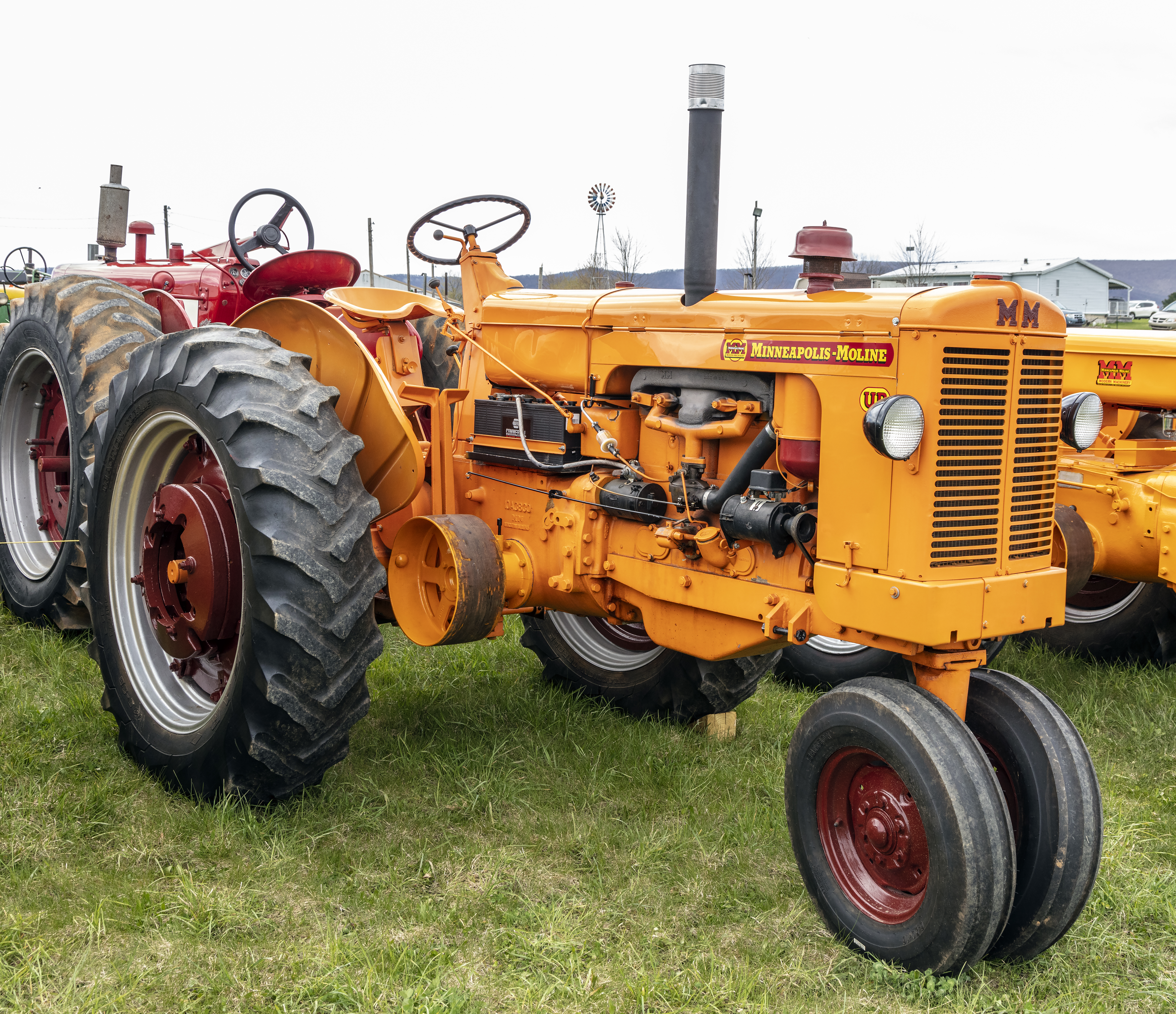
Restored M-M UB

Minneapolis-Moline was a large tractor and farm and industrial machinery producer based in Minneapolis and Hopkins, Minnesota, Minnesota known for its Minneapolis-Moline tractor line. It was the product of a merger of three companies in 1929: Minneapolis Steel & Machinery (MSM) which was noted for its Twin City tractors, Minneapolis Threshing Machine Company (MTM) which also produced Minneapolis tractors, and the Moline Implement Company formerly known as the Moline Plow Company. It had manufacturing facilities on Lake Street at Hiawatha Avenue in Minneapolis, in Hopkins and in Moline, Illinois. Originally known as the Minneapolis-Moline Power Implement Company, and later shortened Minneapolis-Moline Company. Motec Industries was a short lived corporate name change from ca. 1960 until the company's acquisition by White Motor Corporation in 1963.

== History ==
=== Labor ===
MSM, the largest of the merged companies, had been a leader in the anti–labor union (open shop) movement. It was a member of the Citizen's Alliance (CA), a powerful Minneapolis business league that kept the city largely union free for over 20 years. During World War I, the unions agreed to not strike to aid the war effort, in exchange the National War Labor Board ordered wage hikes for workers. MSM refused, starting a court battle that would not be fully resolved until the 1940s.

Minneapolis-Moline inherited MSM's CA membership and attitude. However, it signed a contract with the AFL Machinists Union in 1935, during the Flour City Ornamental Iron strike and after the 1934 Teamster's Strikes, both of which were notable for their violence. This was a notable defection that foreshadowed the collapse of the open-shop movement in Minneapolis. However, this did not mean peaceful labor relations in the years to come. After World War II, the company would have to deal with strikes and pension disputes.

=== British assembly ===
Between 1946 and 1949 the company offered two tractors assembled in Great Britain, the UDS which appeared in 1946 with a price of £1,050 and the Meadows diesel powered UDM which was introduced in 1948 with a price of £1,200. Both tractors were too expensive for the British market and after poor sales, production stopped in 1949.

=== Acquisition of BF Avery ===
In 1951 Minneapolis-Moline acquired the BF Avery & Sons farm equipment company.

=== Motec Industries ===
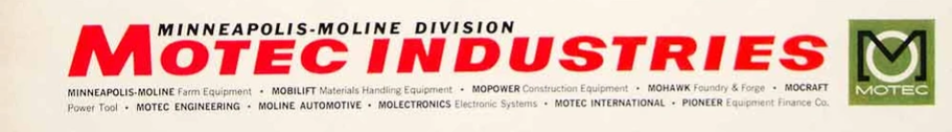
Motec Logo with Subsidiaries listed

In the 1960's Minneapolis-Moline reorganized under the name Motec. Minneapolis-Moline tractors became a subsidiary of Motec.

=== 1963 acquisition by White ===
Motec was acquired in 1963 by the White Motor Company who also owned the Oliver brand. The purchase also included the workers pension fund which White absorbed as an asset and hundreds lost all of their pension contributions plus the matching amounts. The Minneapolis-Moline brand name was dropped by White in 1974, six years before White folded. AGCO purchased White in 1991 and produced tractors under the latter's name until 2001. The Hopkins headquarters site has been redeveloped, and is now the location for a Honda automobile dealership. The Minneapolis Hiawatha Avenue site has been developed as a shopping mall, anchored by a Target store and a Cub (SuperValu) grocery store.

== Tractors ==
=== Moline Universal ===
The Universal was originally produced by Universal Tractor Co until it was acquired by Moline. The tractor consisted of a single axle with power to it, this was then connected to a variety of interchangeable implements from which the operating station is located. This was Moline's most successful tractor. Four different series were made over its production span, beginning with The Original, followed by the B and C, and the last upgraded model, the D. Introduced in 1917 (20–30 years prior to many competitors), Model D featured what many believe to be the first electric starter for a tractor. It featured built-in electric lights as well, which was rarely available in this time period. This interchangeable implement holding design later evolved into the Uni-Tractor.

=== UDLX Comfortractor ===
Minneapolis-Moline pioneered the concept of the closed-cab farm tractor in 1938 by developing the UDLX Comfortractor (also known as the Model U Deluxe). The UDLX had flowing enclosing bodywork and a well appointed all-weather cabin, which contained a passenger seat, the idea being that the farmer and his wife would ride in comfort. Entry to the cabin was by a large rear door. The bodywork was painted in as the bright "Prairie-Gold" colour while the bumper and hubcabs were chromed. It was equipped with automotive features such as safety glass windscreen, windshield wipers, an electric starter and a dashboard with a speedometer, clock, sun visor, rear view mirror, plus several firsts in a tractor, including a heater, a cigarette lighter, ashtray, and a radio.

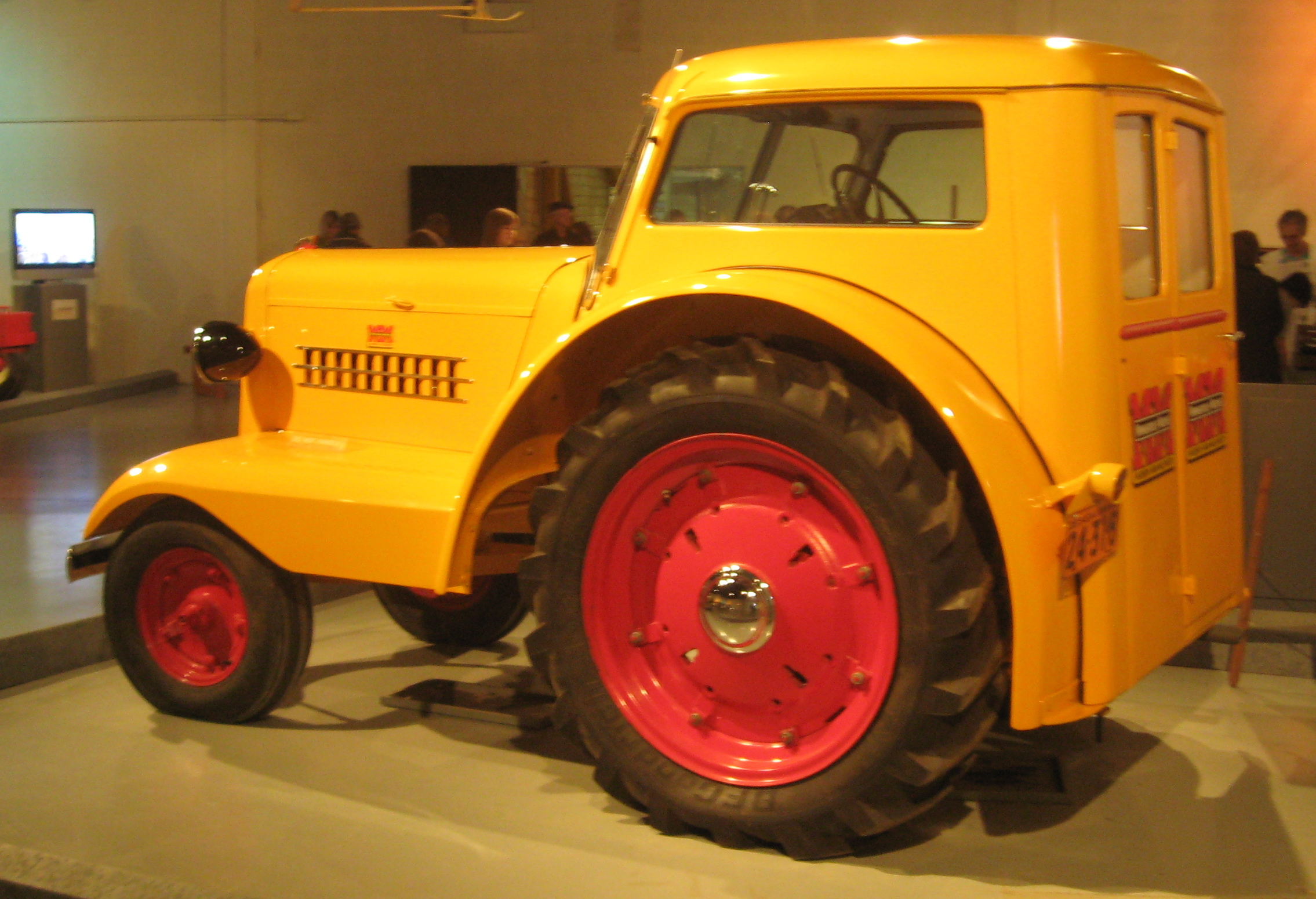
1938 Minneapolis-Moline UDLX tractor side view

The 2.9 ton tractor was powered by a high compression Minneapolis-Moline four-cylinder 283 cu.in (4,637 cc) KED petrol engine which produced 46 hp and drove a gearbox with five forward and one reverse gears which gave it a top speed of 40 mph. The model experienced poor sales due to its high cost of US$2,155 (1938) (double that of a Farmall or Deere),. A general recession starting in 1938 also negatively impacted sales of this and most other durable goods.

Only 125 of the UDLX were produced before production stopped in 1941. UDLX was part of one of Minneapolis-Moline's most popular series. The U series saw a number of variants, including the UTU, UTS, UTL, UDU, UDU, UOPL, UB, UTIL, and UT.

=== GT ===
Introduced in 1941 this tractor was powered by a four cylinder petrol/paraffin engine which produced 40 hp and which was sufficient to give it a five-plow US power rating. Its transmission had four-forward and one-reverse gears.

=== Uni-Tractor ===
In the early 1950s M-M introduced the Uni-Tractor which was a three-wheeled powered unit used to drive other units. The concept was instead of having different tractors and harvesters, one power unit mated to the correct unit could do all the jobs a farmer needed—i.e. of as M-M sales stated "All-in-One". While it was sold in small numbers the concept never was popular with most farmers. Many farmers referred to the Uni-Tractor as the Minneapolis-Moline Motorcycle. The Uni-System design was sold to New-Idea in 1963 after being acquired by White.

=== ZB series ===
Introduced in 1953 the ZB was an improved version of the ZA tractor with a more comfortable seat and improved steering. It was powered by a four-cylinder petrol engine which produced 34.8 hp and drove a gearbox with five-forward and one reverse gears. The ZBU version had a tricycle front axle with double front wheels, while the ZBN version had a single front wheel and the ZBE had a wide front axle. production stopped in 1955.

=== M series ===
The M series was introduced in 1960 with the M-5, followed by the M-504 in 1962, the M-602 and M-604 (4WD) in 1963, and finally the M-670 in 1964. The M series ended production in 1970.

=== G series ===
The six cylinder G series actually started in 1954 when Moline took the engine block of their six cylinder gas power plant engine turned it into a diesel and installed it on a G series tractor in place of the four cylinder. In 1955 they made a few changes to larger engine bearings and the final drive and introduced the model GB Diesel.

The six-cylinder G series comprises the largest and most powerful Minneapolis-Moline tractors. Production started in 1959 with the G-VI, followed by the G-704 in 1962. Models that followed were the G-705, G-706, G-707, G-708, G-1000, G-900, G-1000 Vista, G-950, G-1050 and the G-1350.

The G-1350 which was introduced in 1969 was powered by a six-cylinder diesel engine which produced 141 hp and drove a transmission with ten-forward and two-reverse gears. It was also sold as the Oliver 2155. It was only sold for two years before being replaced by the G-1355. The G-1355 was introduced 1972 and was the most powerful Minneapolis-Moline tractor ever built with 142 PTO HP. The G-955 was manufactured between 1973 and 1974 and was the last tractor manufactured under the Minneapolis-Moline name, as White ceased using the brand name in 1974.

In the early 1970s, White also sold four Oliver models rebranded as Minneapolis-Moline: the Oliver 1555 was sold as the G-550, the Oliver 1655 was sold as the G-750, the Oliver 1755 was sold as the G-850 and the Oliver 1855 was sold as the G-940. These tractors had 53, 70, 86, and 92 PTO horsepower, respectively.

In 1971, White sold two diesel imports made by Fiat as Minneapolis-Moline: the MM G-350 (41 PTO horsepower, 3-cylinder) and the MM G-450 (54 PTO horsepower, 4-cylinder). The G-350 was also sold as the Oliver 1265 and the Cockshutt 1265; the G-450 was sold as the Oliver 1365 and the Cockshutt 1365.

A pair of articulated 4 wheel drives were produced as the A4T 1400 and A4T 1600, both available in LP or Diesel versions. Unique to these tractors was the fact they were developed and brought to production in about 8 months time. They were also found wearing Oliver colors carrying 2455 and 2655 respevtively with the same options.

== Gallery ==
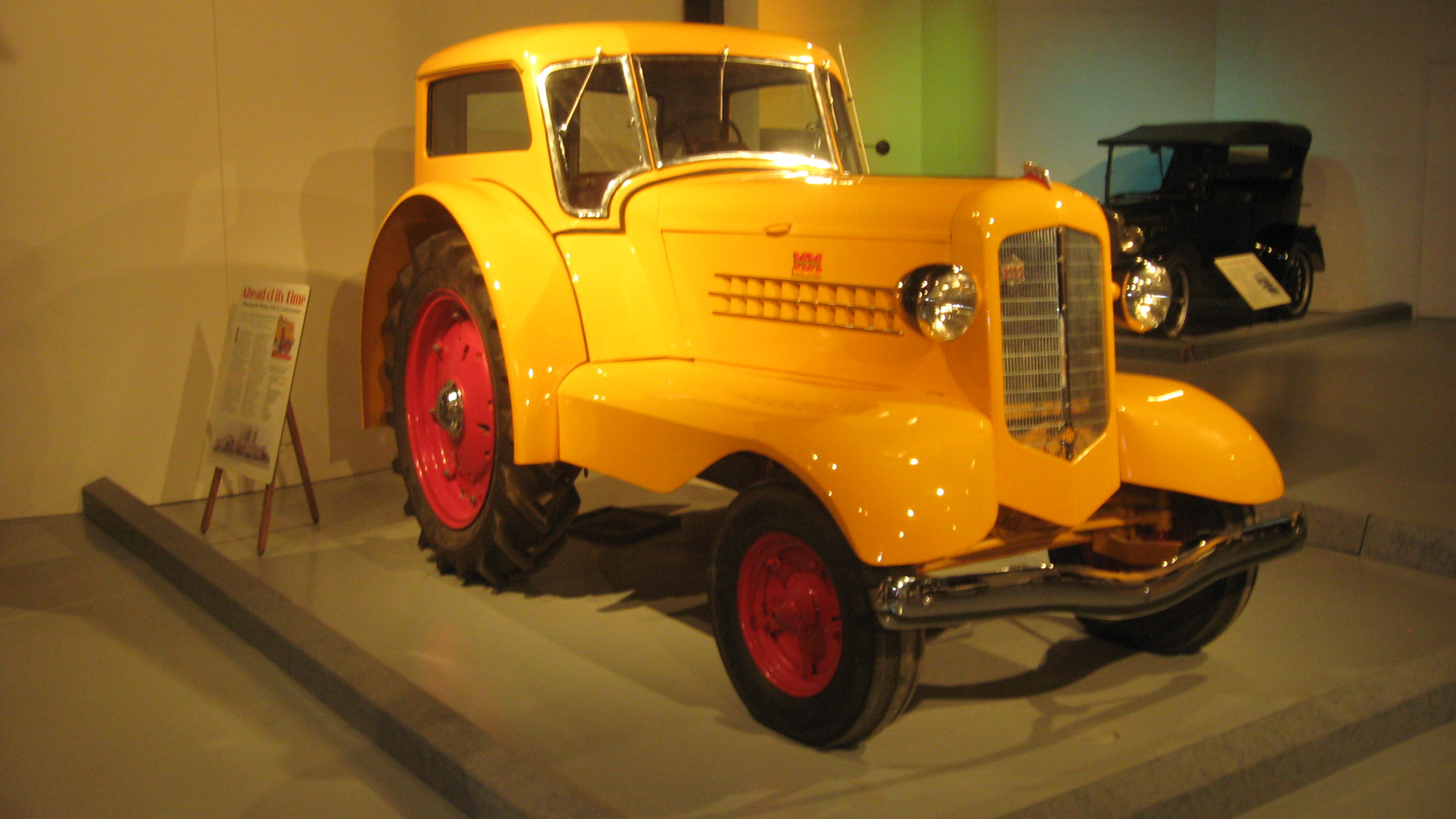
1938 Model UDLX in the Saskatchewan Western Development Museum in Saskatoon

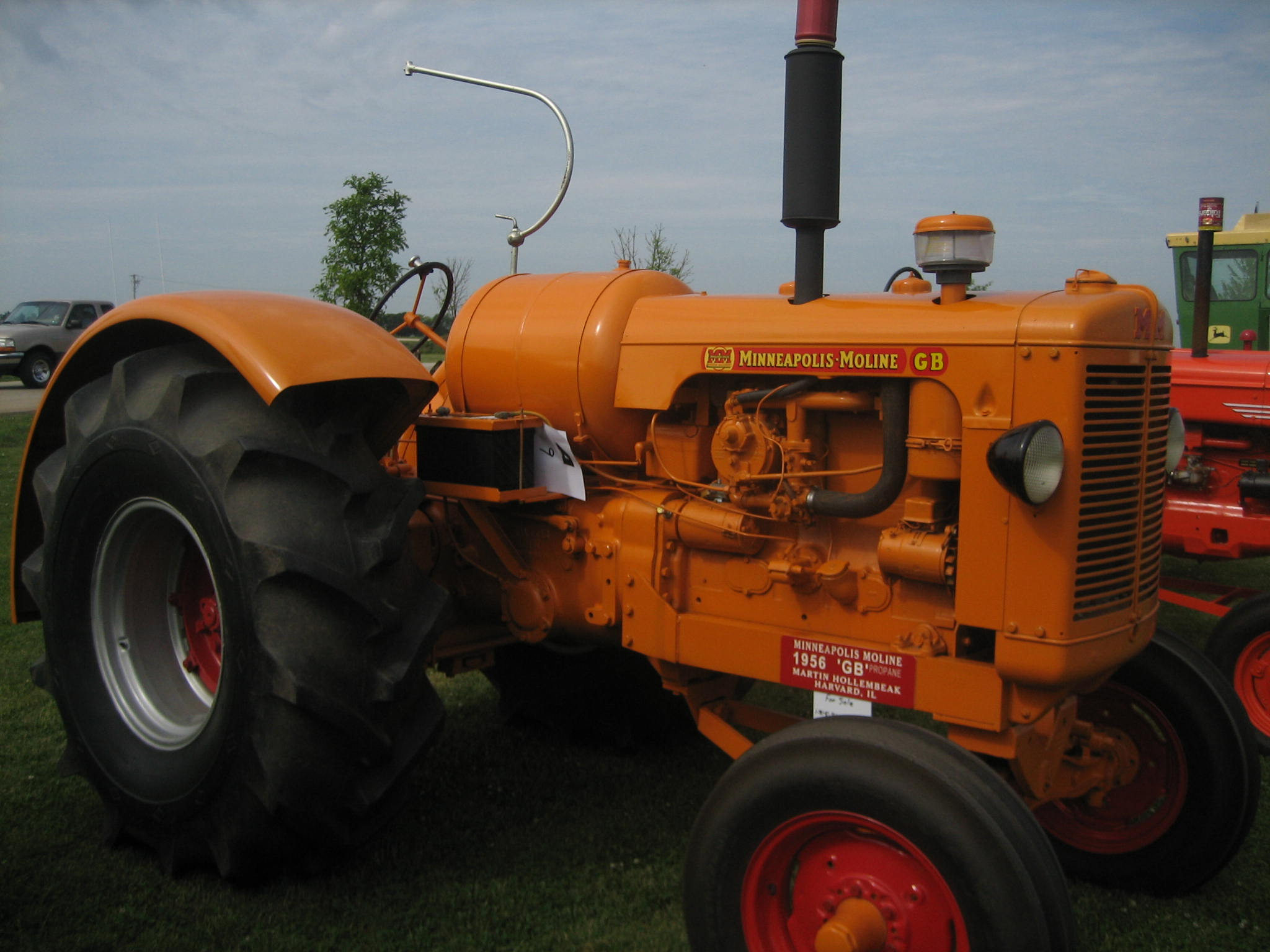
1956 GB (Propane)

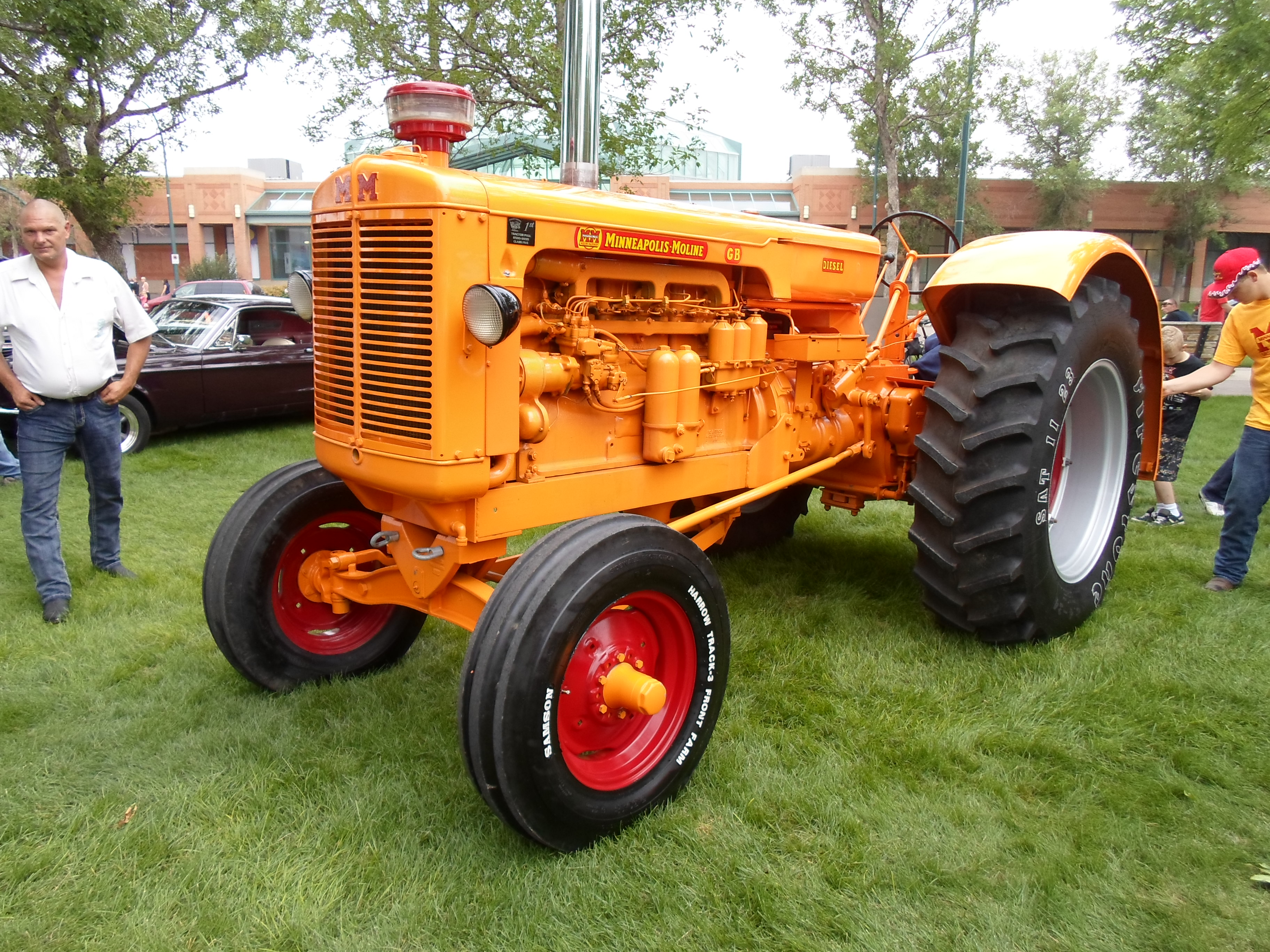
GB (Diesel)

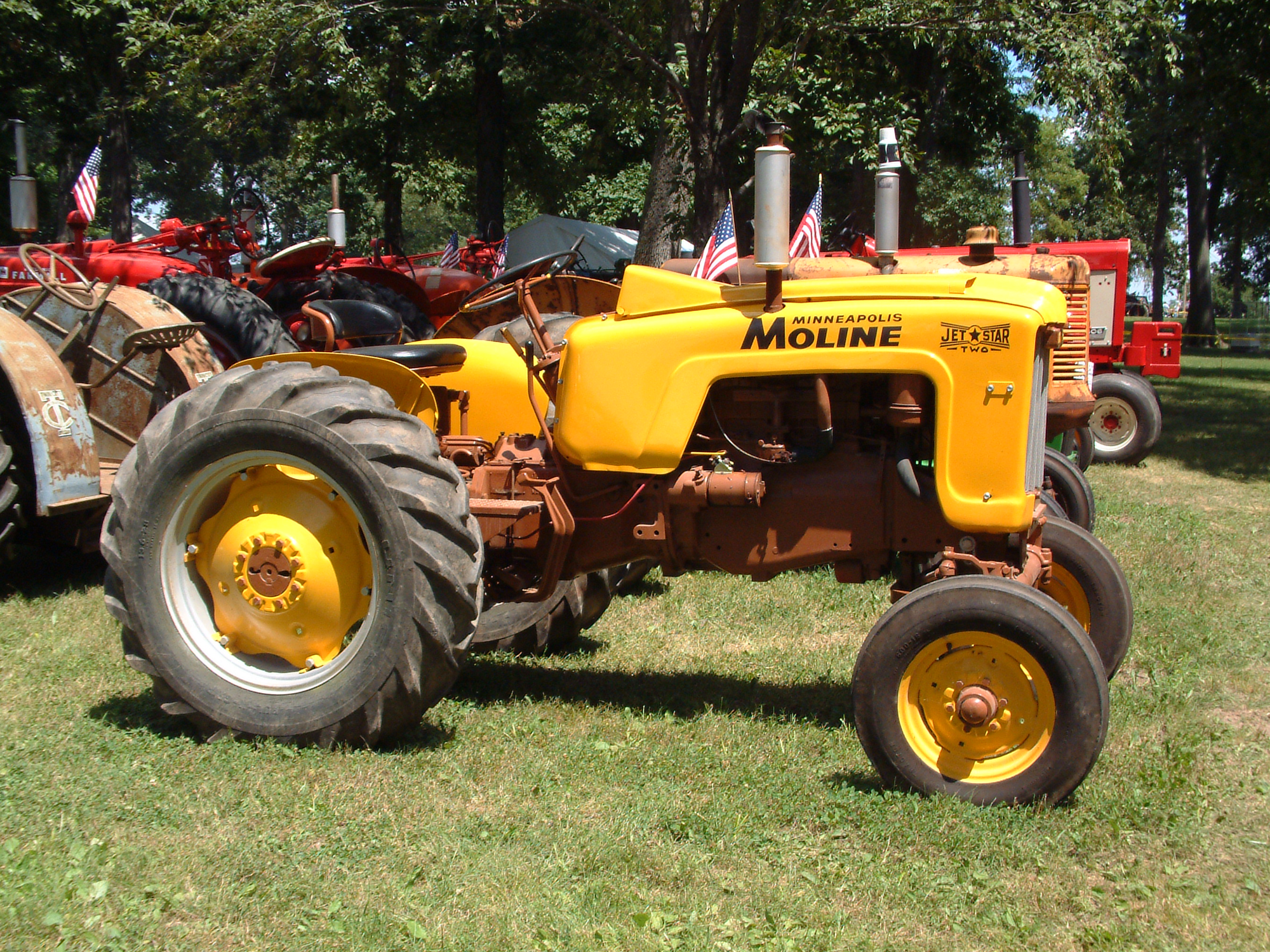
Jet Star Two

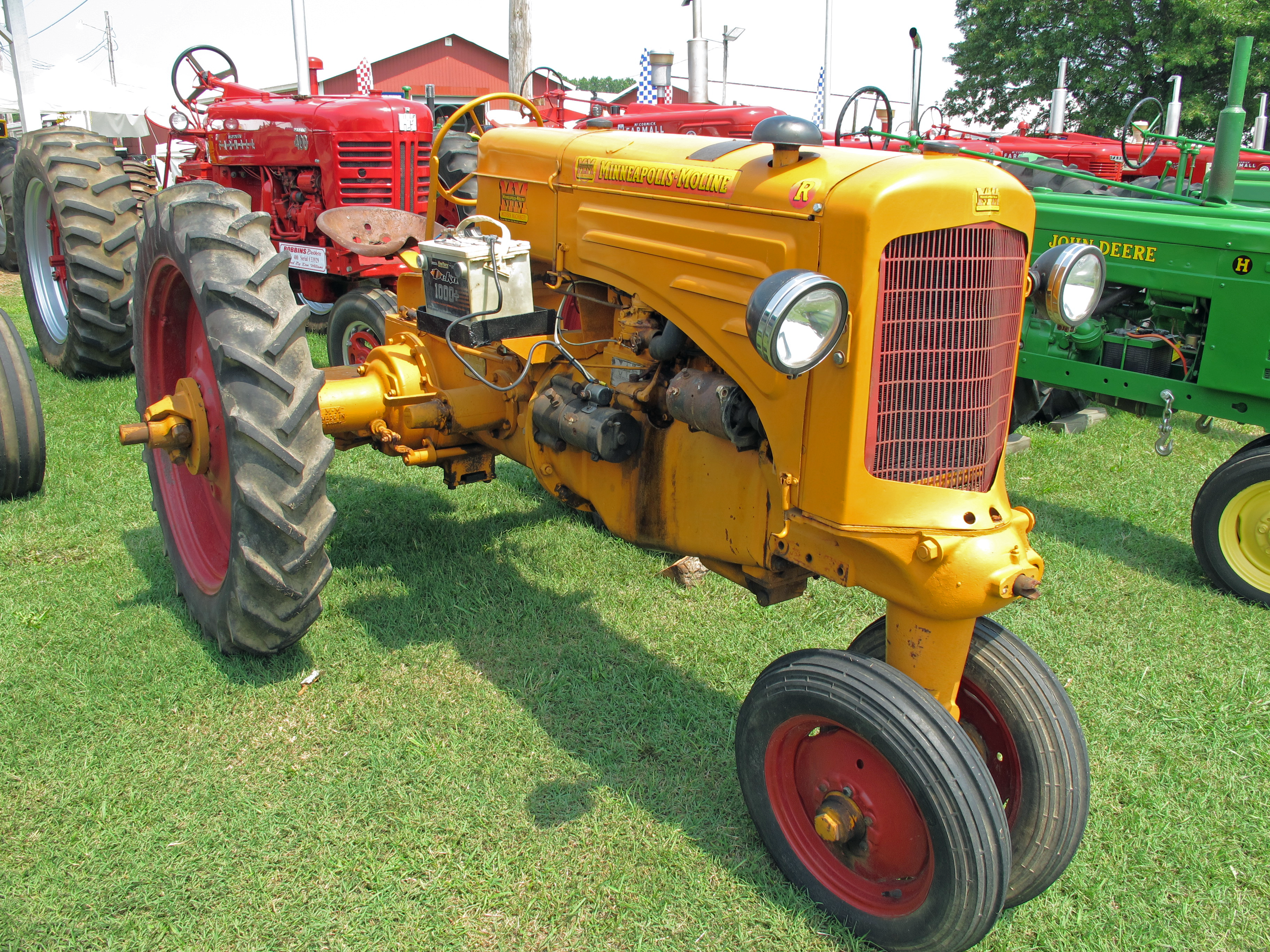
Minneapolis-Moline R at the 2012 Salem County Fair, NJ.

== See also ==
- Oliver Farm Equipment Company
- White Farm Equipment
- New Idea
