= Malina =

Malina may refer to:

== Places ==
- Malina Cove, Antarctica
- Malina (depopulated settlement), between Bileća and Trebinje in Bosnia and Herzegovina
- Malina (river), a tributary of the Morava river in Slovakia
- Mălina, a tributary of the river Iapa in Neamț County, Romania
- Mălina, a tributary of the river Siret in Galați County, Romania

=== Bulgaria ===
- Malina, Dobrich Province
- Malina, Burgas Province

=== Poland ===
- Malina, Kuyavian-Pomeranian Voivodeship (north-central Poland)
- Malina, Łódź Voivodeship (central Poland)

== People ==
- Malina (surname)
- Malina (given name)
- Malina (Bulgarian singer)
- Mălina (name), a Romanian female name

== Fiction ==
- Malina (novel), a 1971 novel by Ingeborg Bachmann
  - Malina (film), a 1991 German-Austrian film based on the novel
- Malina, a character from the 2015 TV miniseries Heroes Reborn
- Malina (The Emperor's New School), a character in the 2006 TV series The Emperor's New School
- Malina, a character from the video game Helltaker

== Taxonomy ==
- Diboma malina, a beetle in the family Cerambycidae
- Ilnacora malina, a plant bug in the family Miridae
- Langsdorfia malina, a moth in the family Cossidae
- Rekoa malina, a butterfly in the family Lycaenidae

== Other uses ==
- Malinas score, an evaluation of whether a pregnant woman is about to give birth
- Malina (mythology), a poorly attested name for the Inuit solar deity in the story Sun and Moon (Inuit myth)
- Malina (album), a 2017 album by progressive rock/metal band Leprous
