= NK Adriatic =

Croatian football club

- Full name: Nogometni klub Adriatic
- Founded: 2010
- Ground: Pomoćni teren u Dugopolju
- Capacity: 500
- Manager: Duško Vulikić
- League: 2. ŽNL
- 2022/23: 3rd

NK Adriatic is a Croatian football club based in the town of Split. They currently compete in 2. ŽNL, the regional league for Split-Dalmatia. The club is well known for their youth player development.

== History ==
NK Adriatic was founded on 25 May 2010.

== Current squad ==
Note: Flags indicate national team as defined under FIFA eligibility rules; some limited exceptions apply. Players may hold more than one non-FIFA nationality.

No.	Pos.	Nation	Player
—	GK	CRO	Jure Milina
—	GK	CRO	Duje Poklepović
—	DF	CRO	Antonio Jurko
—	DF	CRO	Dominik Šaškor
—	DF	CRO	Kristian Smoljanović
—	DF	CRO	Ivo Jovanović
—	DF	CRO	Josip Marinović

No.	Pos.	Nation	Player
—	MF	CRO	David Varnica
—	MF	CRO	Mislav Koljanin
—	MF	CRO	Tonći Radovniković
—	MF	CRO	Jan Morović
—	FW	CRO	Tino Babnik
—	FW	CRO	Luka Petrović
