= Molniya =

Molniya (Russian for lightning) may refer to:

- Molniya (Drone), a Russian military drone
- Molniya (satellite), a Soviet military communications satellite
  - Molniya orbit
- Molniya (explosive trap), a KGB explosive device
- Molniya (rocket), a variation of the Soyuz launch vehicle
- OKB-4 Molniya, a design bureau responsible for the Molniya R-60 and Vympel R-73 air-to-air missiles
- NPO Molniya, a Soviet design bureau responsible for the Shuttle Buran programme
- Molnija, a watch and clockmaker
- Molniya, a version of Tarantul-class corvette
