= Malina (depopulated settlement) =

Historical and archaeological site in Herzegovina

Malinska Gradina
- Location within Bosnia and Herzegovina
- 42°47′17″N 18°23′41″E
- Type: Hillfort
- Location: Malinska Gradina is situated north of Mosko, close to Radanov Do.
- Region: Bosnia and Herzegovina

Malina (Serbian Cyrillic: Малина) is a depopulated settlement located between Bileća and Trebinje in Herzegovina (Republika Srpska, Bosnia and Herzegovina). It is 9.1 km to N-NE of Trebinje, 10.6 km to S-SW of Bileća, 28.9 km to E-NE of Dubrovnik and 38.7 km to N-NW of Herceg Novi. Malinska Gradina is situated north of village Mosko, close to village Radanov Do. Hill Malinska Gradina has an elevation of 705 meters.

== Antiquities ==
The area of Malina has preserved many of the antiquities, including old grave monuments. The monuments are rectangular in shape and are often engraved with images. These engravings represent people, animals, crescents, bows and arrows. There are no preserved inscriptions on these monuments.

Foundations and other remains of old houses are also well preserved. Families of the Maleševci clan have lived at the Malina location. It is near the spring of Malinski Potok Stream. Old stones, which represented border walls of parcels, remain on site. The hill named Malinska Gradina shows that this location was "gradina“, the remains of old fortresses. Between Malina and Preslo is an area called Gomila (the Serbian word for tumuli), where a few prehistoric tumuli may be found.

== History of the Settlement ==
Malina is mentioned in the census of Herzegovina, dated 1475-1477. In this source, Malina is mentioned along with its neighboring Skrobotno ('Skrobodna'), as a winter shepherd settlement. From the years of 1475-1477, the leader of the shepherd community (džemat) Radan son of Novak inhabited the area and some of its close settlements . This community had 25 homes out of which 3 homes were for unmarried men at that time. Their summer settlement was in Koročica. From 1475 to 1477, Malina was administratively within nahia Rudine.

The Maleševci is a clan that originated in Malina. Some members started to immigrate from this settlement during the 15th century. In Skrobotno, there is a record of a branch found of this clan during the 15th century. Presently, records show that Malina was inhabited only by the descendants of Maleševci clan.

== See also ==
- Maleševci
