= Melina, Dobretići =

Melina
- Village
- Location within Bosnia and Herzegovina
- Coordinates: 44.3760222°N 17.4410441°E
- Country: Bosnia and Herzegovina
- Entity: Federation of Bosnia and Herzegovina
- Canton: Central Bosnia
- Municipality: Dobretići

Area
  - Total: 1.71 sq mi (4.42 km^{2})

Population (2013)
  - Total: 196
  - Density: 115/sq mi (44.3/km^{2})
- Time zone: UTC+1 (CET)
  - Summer (DST): UTC+2 (CEST)

Melina is a village in the municipality of Dobretići, Central Bosnia Canton, Bosnia and Herzegovina.

== Demographics ==
According to the 2013 census, its population was 196, all Croats.
