= Malina (surname) =

Malina (Czech/Slovak feminine: Malinová) is a surname. Notable people with the surname include:

- Andrzej Malina (born 1960), Polish wrestler
- Bruce Malina (1933–2017), American biblical scholar
- Frank Malina (1912–1981), American engineer and painter
- Jaroslav Malina (disambiguation), multiple individuals
- Joshua Malina (born 1966), American actor
- Judith Malina (1926–2015), American actor
- Libor Malina (born 1973), Czech discus thrower
- Ľubomír Malina (born 1991), Slovak ice hockey player
- Roger Malina (born 1950), American physicist and astronomer
- Tom Malina (born 1978), Czech windsurfer
