= Minneapolis Steel & Machinery Company =

Minneapolis Steel and Machinery
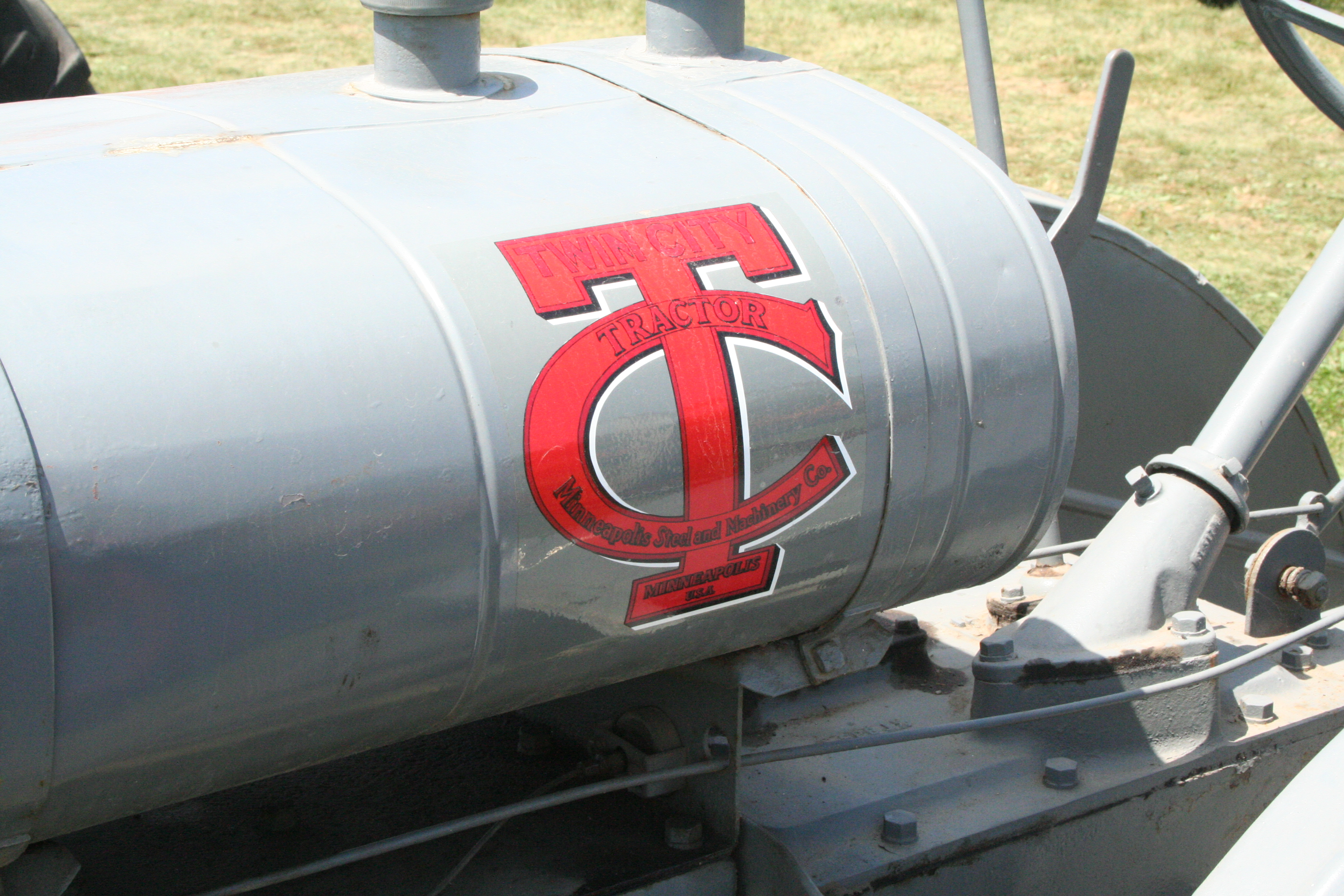
- Minneapolis Steel & Machinery Company Twin City logo
- Industry: Heavy equipment; Engines; Structural Materials; Bridge building
- Predecessors: Minnesota Malleable Iron Company; Twin City Iron Works
- Founded: April 24, 1902; 124 years ago in Minneapolis, MN, United States
- Founder: Geo. M. Gillette
- Defunct: 1929
- Successor: Minneapolis-Moline
- Headquarters: Minneapolis, MN

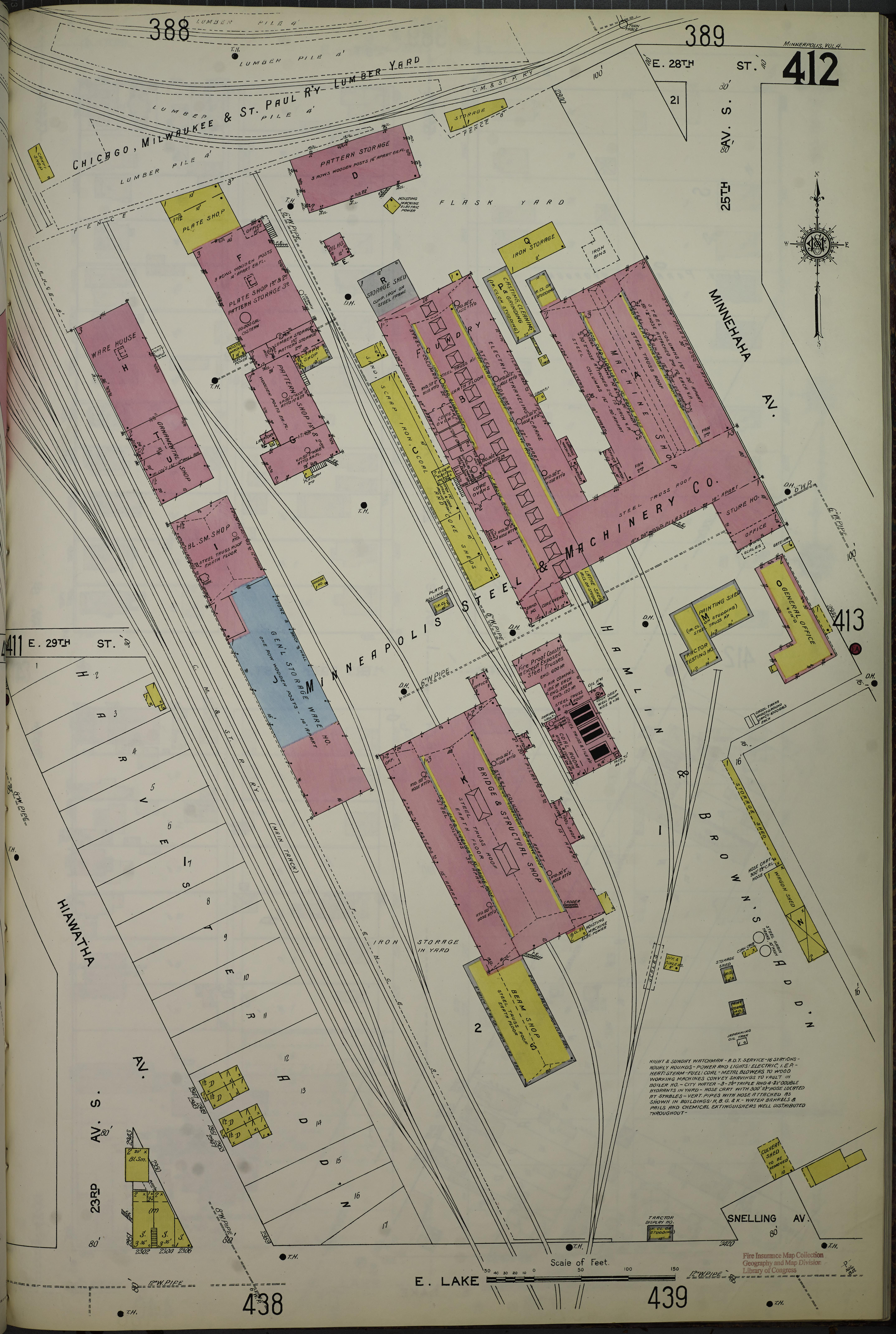
Minneapolis Steel & Machinery Company Plant (1912)

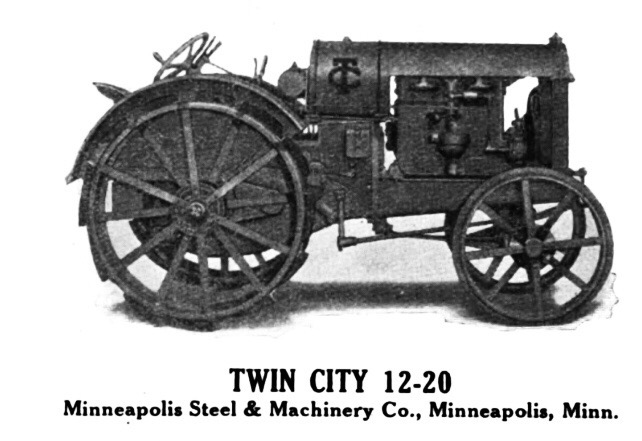
Minneapolis Steel & Machinery Company Twin City 12-20

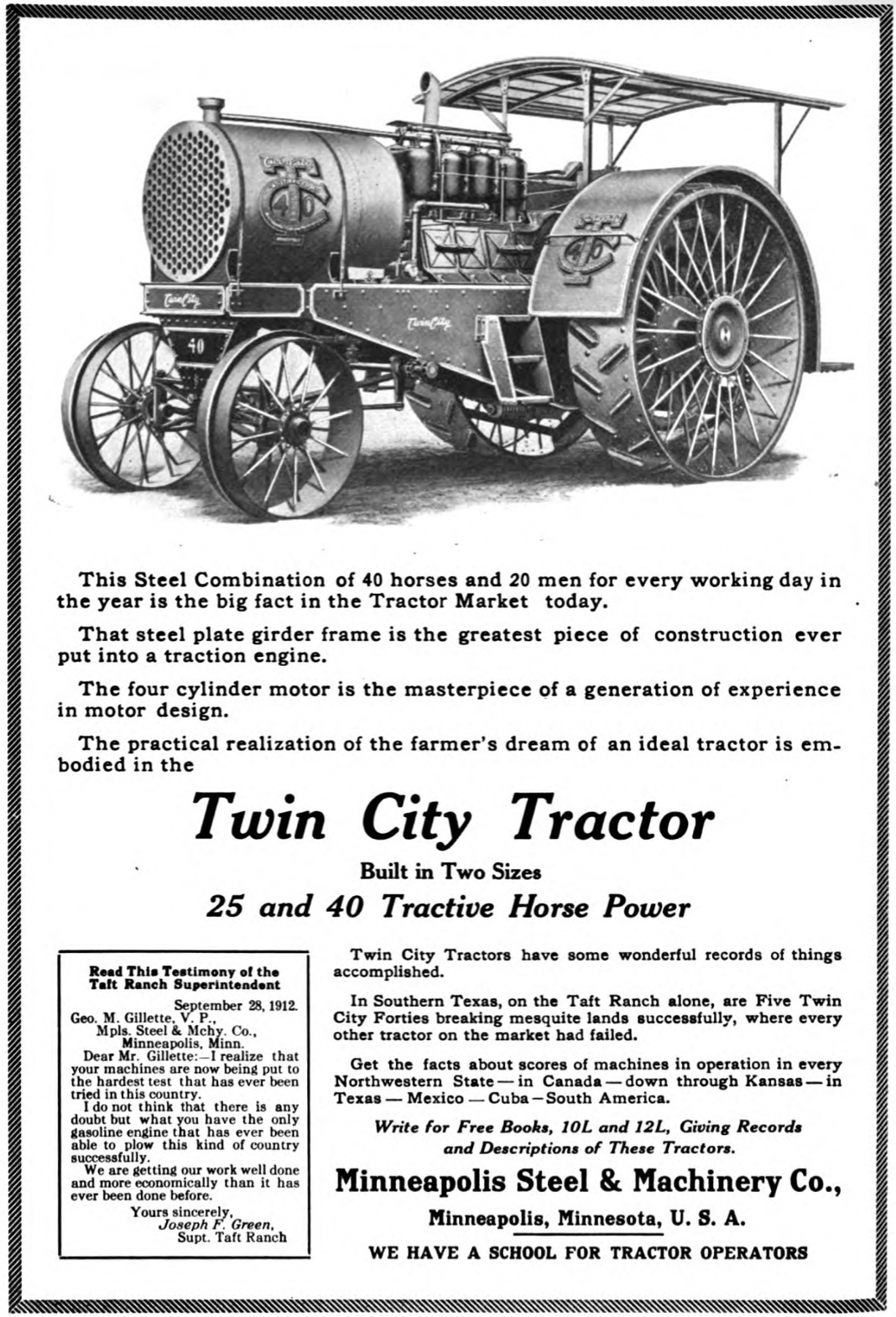
Minneapolis Steel & Machinery Company Twin City 25 or 40 hp

The Minneapolis Steel & Machinery Company was located at and around the intersection of East 29th street, Minnehaha Avenue, and Lake Street, near the triangle-shaped Longfellow Field (now gone). Approximately 4.500 tractors were produced in 1928. It was one of the companies that merged to form the Minneapolis-Moline tractor company in 1929. All but one of the buildings in the old factory complex were leveled in the 1970s to make way for the first urban Target store in Minneapolis. The surviving building was designed by the local firm of Hewitt and Brown as a three-story brick "garage" and engineering facility. Prototypes for the "Jeep" were invented and implemented for use in World War I in this structure, now occupied by 7-SIGMA, Incorporated.
