= Malinas score =

- Purpose: determine when birth will occur

The Malinas score is an evaluation that allows to determine whether a pregnant woman is about to give birth. It was invented by Yves Malinas (French physician, died 20 January 1997).

It is mainly used in case of unexpected prehospital cases: the score indicates if it is possible to transport the pregnant woman or if it is best to let her give birth onsite. It is based on five criteria: how many times she has been pregnant, the duration of the labour so far, the duration of each contraction, the interval between two contractions, and whether or not her waters have broken. Each criterion is evaluated by a number between zero and two:

Malinas score
Score	Number of pregnancies to date	Duration of labour	Duration of contractions	Interval between two contractions	Breaking of waters
0	One	< 3 hours	< 1 minute	> 5 minutes	No
1	Two	Between 3 and 5 hours	1 minute	Between 3 and 5 minutes	Recently (< 1 hour)
2	Three or more	> 6 hours	> 1 minute	< 3 minutes (at least 2 in 5 minutes)	> 1 hour

The score is the sum of these five criteria. When the score is less than five, it is possible to transport the pregnant woman to a maternity hospital or a medical structure. When the score is six or more, an imminent parturition (i.e. childbirth) is likely, especially if the woman feels a need to push.

== Criticisms ==
In a study published in 2001, it was suggested that the Malinas Score alone was not a reliable indicator of imminent birth as approximately 25% of unplanned homebirths in the study had a Malinas Score of less than five. An amended scoring system has been proposed which would add additional scores for hemorrhaging, whether the expectant mother was panicking and how long transport to the hospital would take. This amended system would result in the pregnant woman being transported on a score less than seven.
