= Moline Plow Company =

American plow manufacturer

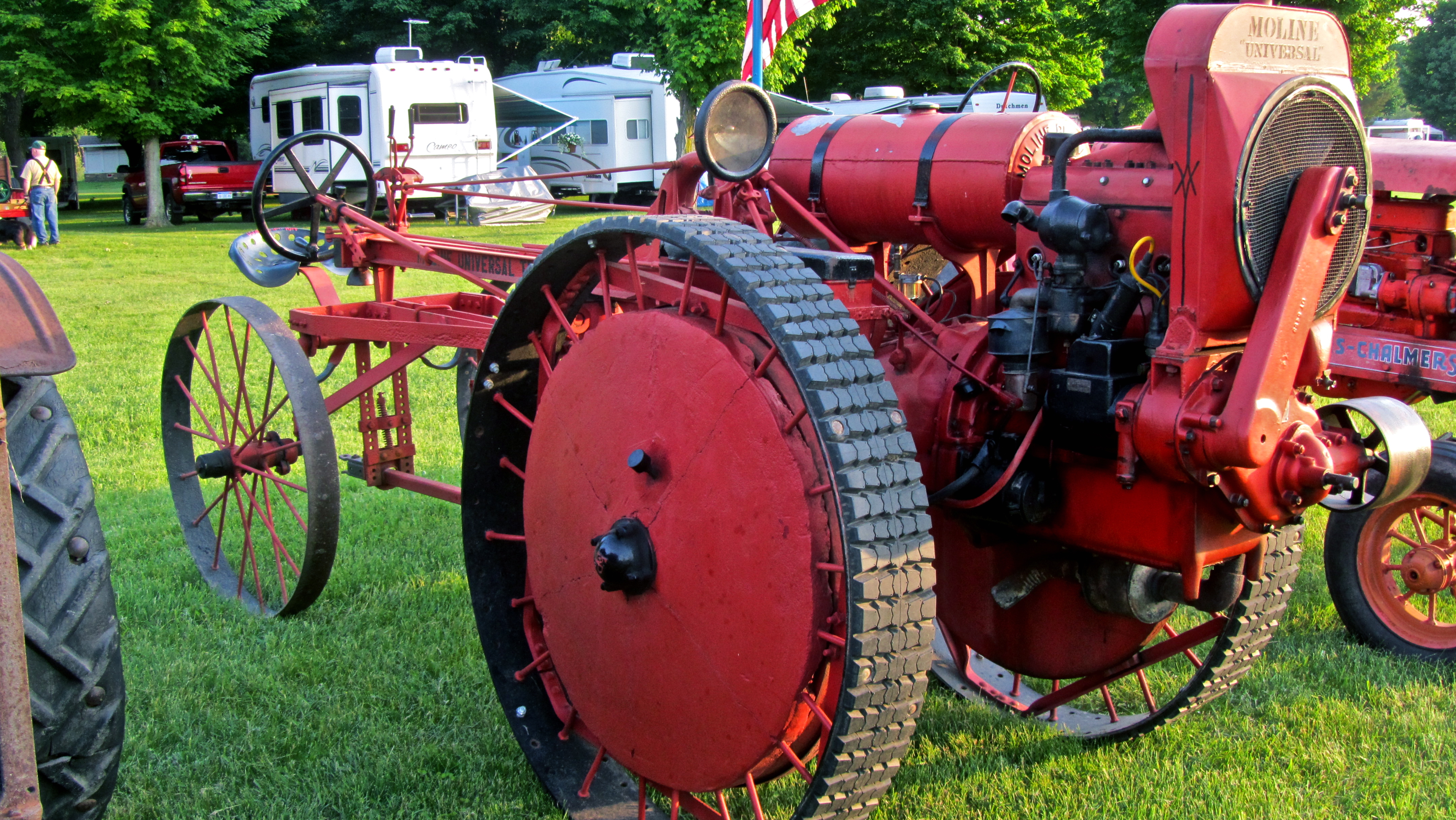
A restored Moline Universal.

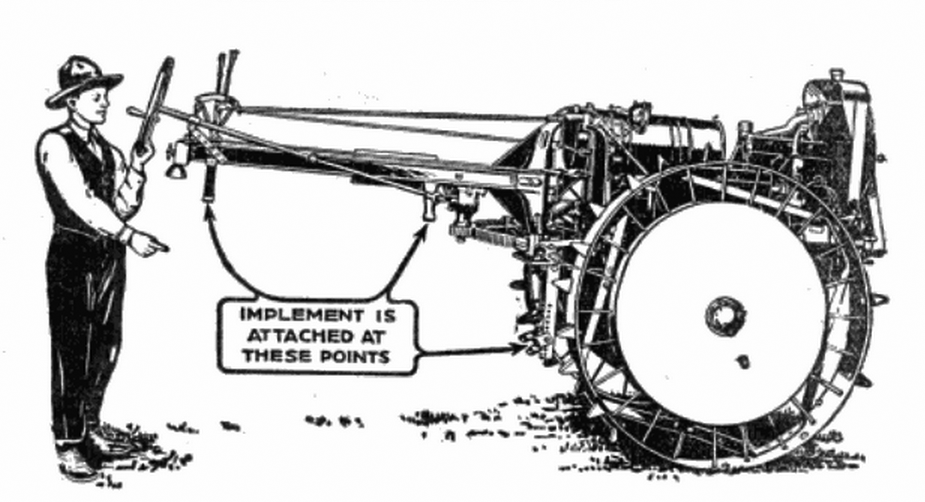
Moline Universal implement attachment points, 1920.

The Moline Plow Company was an American manufacturer formed in the 1870s and headquartered in Moline, Illinois, USA. Its primary products were plows and other farm implements, but it also produced the Moline Universal Tractor (1916–1923), the Stephens automobile (1916–1924), and wagons and carriages (during its earlier years).

After divesting itself from the tractor and automobile businesses, the company refocused on implement production and changed its name to the Moline Implement Company in 1925.

In 1929, the Moline Implement Company merged with two other companies, the Minneapolis Steel & Machinery Company and the Minneapolis Threshing Machine Company, to form the Minneapolis-Moline Power Implement Company.

== Beginnings ==
Moline Plow was formed in the 1870s when the firm of Candee & Swan won a lawsuit against their competitor Deere and Company, allowing it to use the "Moline Plow" name. Reorganized under the new name, Moline built a line of horse-drawn plows and other implements to serve the large American agricultural market. The company also produced wagons and carriages, absorbing similar but smaller manufacturers.

== Expansion Into Tractors ==
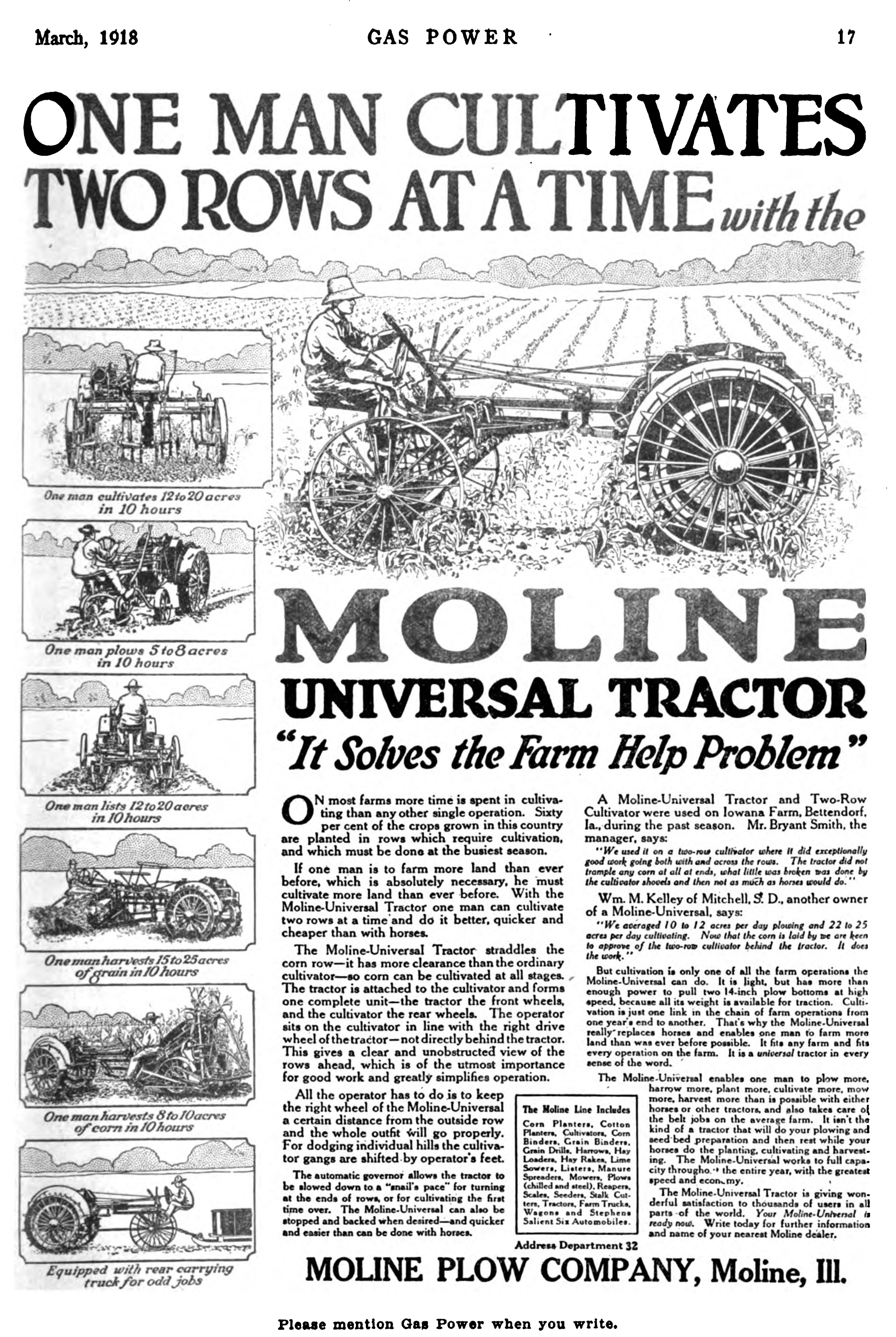
Moline Universal Tractor advertisement, 1918.

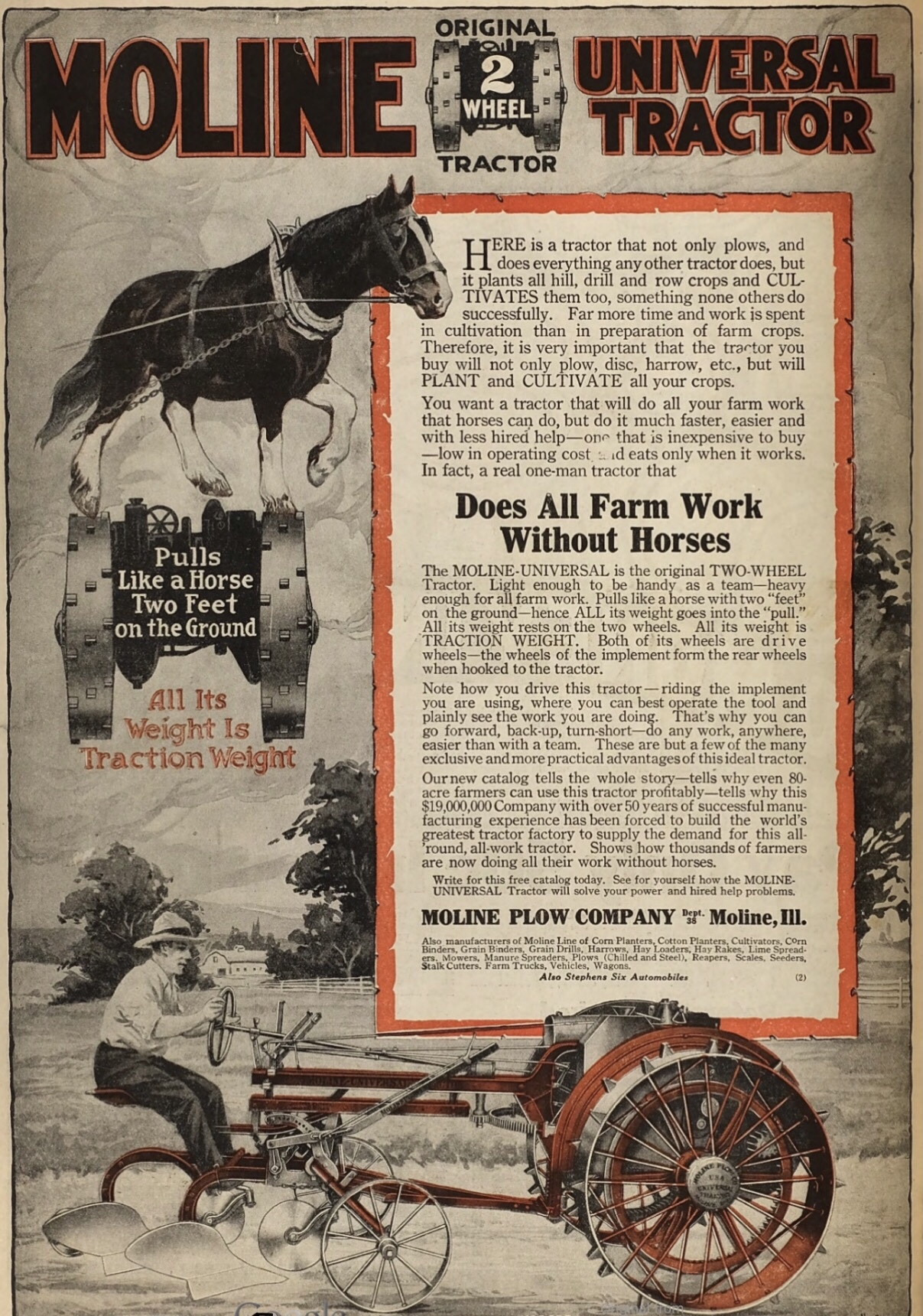
Moline advertisement (1917)

In 1915, Moline Plow purchased the Universal Tractor Company for its patents, then redesigned Universal's tractor in an early attempt to serve unmet market demand for a small, light, affordable, general-purpose tractor. The resulting Moline Universal Tractor (sometimes hyphenated as "Moline-Universal" in various advertisements) was a commercial success, selling from about 1916 until 1923.

Moline Plow considered a very similar tractor, the Allis-Chalmers Model 6-12, to be a patent-infringing copy.

The design was a two-wheel tractor, whose trailing implement provided the rear wheels to form a four-wheel articulated unit. The front powered design was familiar to farmers using horses, and it was nimble, more suitable for cultivating row crops than were most contemporary tractors.

The Moline Models B and C used a 2-cylinder opposed engine, while the model D used a 4-cylinder engine. The model D was the first production tractor to come standard with a starter and lights. The model D also utilized the Remy Governor Generator system, which used a rheostat linked to the generator as both governor and throttle.

An overview of Moline Universal design and operation was written by corporate author Harry W. Adams. It appeared as an article in a 1920 how-to guide for farmers, and is available in the 1920 book Adams' Common Sense Instruction On Gas Tractor Operation.

== Expansion Into Automobiles ==
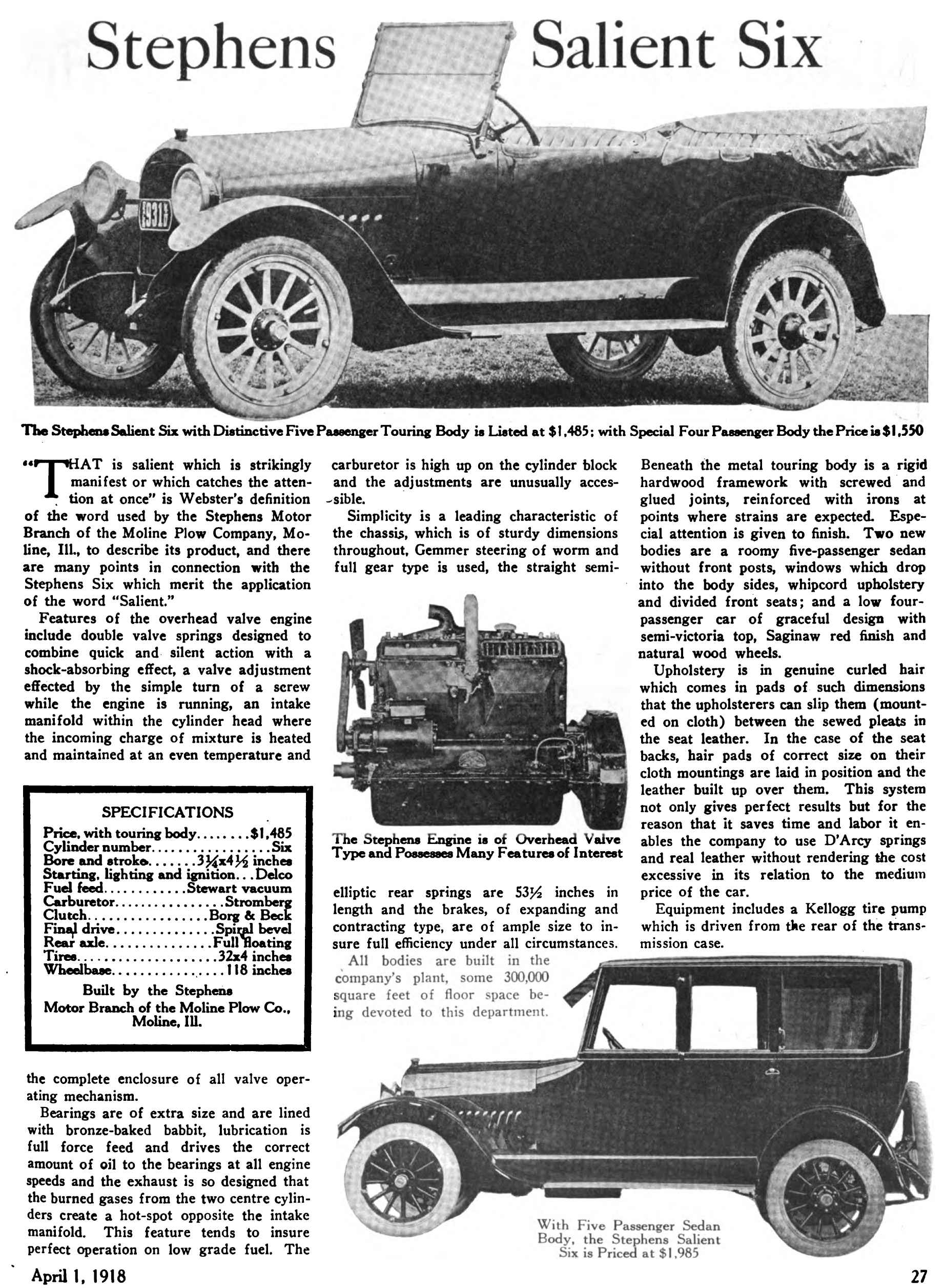
An overview of the Stephens Salient Six automobile, built by the Stephens division of the Moline Plow Company, in the journal Horseless Age, 1918.

Also around 1916, Moline Plow entered the automobile business with the Stephens brand, named after one of the founders of Moline Plow.

Around 1918 or 1919, the Willys-Overland Company purchased a majority interest in the Moline Plow Company. The company continued to function without a branding change.

== Refocus On Implements ==
The unfavorable economic climate of the early 1920s, which included the post–World War I recession, the depression of 1920–21, and the tractor wars, ended production of both the Moline-Universal tractors and the Stephens automobiles. With the end of these two business lines, Moline Plow divested itself from the tractor and automobile businesses, and chose to focus on the implement line for its future. To reflect this, the name was changed to the Moline Implement Company.

== Notable Employees ==
Several famous people served as executives or engineers at Moline Plow, including Frank Gates Allen, William P. Bettendorf, George Peek, and Hugh S. Johnson.

== Bibliography ==
- Adams, Harry W., ed. (1920), Adams' Common Sense Instruction On Gas Tractor Operation: A Book For Tractor Operators Who Desire To Know The Most Efficient Methods Of Maintaining A Tractor At Its Highest Working Power. With Contributions From Many Of The Leading Tractor And Accessory Manufacturers Of The United States, Minneapolis, Minnesota, USA: Jensen Printing Company.
- Sanders, Ralph W. (1996), Vintage farm tractors: the ultimate tribute to classic tractors, Stillwater, Minnesota, USA: Town Square Books, ISBN 978-0896582804.
