= Charles Moline =

Anglo-Austrian businessman and cricketer

Charles Harry (or Henry) Moline (June 1863 – 23 May 1927) was an Anglo-Austrian businessman and a cricketer who played in two first-class cricket matches for Cambridge University in 1886. Moline was born in Ljubljana, then called Laibach and at that stage in the Austrian Empire, but now in Slovenia; he died in Weston-super-Mare, Somerset, England. His precise date of birth is not known.

Charles Moline was the son of an English father who was a businessman who set up sugar refining factories in Ljubljana and married a local woman, Emma Kranz, in 1852. The family returned to England in the mid-1860s to live in Bristol where they had sugar refining interests, and Charles was educated at Bristol Grammar School and at Jesus College, Cambridge. Moline had two matches for the university team as a right-handed tail-end batsman and a right-arm slow bowler: in the first he made 16 out of a last-wicket partnership of 40 that took Cambridge's total to 84, and also took his only first-class wicket, but he was not successful in the second game and did not appear again. He played club cricket for Clifton Cricket Club alongside his brothers, Edgar, who also played two first-class matches for Gloucestershire, and Frank.

There is no record that Moline took a degree at Cambridge University; he went into business in the family sugar refinery trade.
