= Edgar Moline =

Anglo-Austrian cricketer (1855-1943)

Personal information
- Full name: Edgar Robert Moline
- Born: 2 January 1855; Laibach, Austrian Empire
- Died: 16 December 1943 (aged 88); Lynton, Devon, England
- Batting: Right-handed
- Bowling: Right-arm slow
- Role: Batsman

Domestic team information
- Years: Team
- 1878: Gloucestershire
- FC debut: 29 July 1878 Gloucestershire v Yorkshire
- Last FC: 19 August 1878 Gloucestershire v Sussex

Career statistics
Competition	First-class
Matches	2
Runs scored	31
Batting average	10.33
100s/50s	0/0
Top score	28
Catches/stumpings	0/0
- Source: CricketArchive, 24 April 2014

Edgar Robert Moline (2 January 1855 – 16 December 1943) was an Anglo-Austrian born in the Austrian Empire to a British father and an Austrian mother. He moved as a child to England and played first-class cricket for Gloucestershire briefly in 1878. Moline was born in Laibach, then in Austria, but now named Ljubljana and part of Slovenia. Together with his brothers Charles Moline, who played cricket for Cambridge, and Frank Moline, who played for Clifton and Bristol Grammar School, he moved to England.

A right-hand bat, Moline played for an invitational XI at the behest of WG Grace in 1877, scoring two and 38. He also made zero and nine against South Wales Cricket Club in 1880. His two first-class matches for Gloucestershire came against Yorkshire and Sussex in July and August 1878 respectively. He scored thirty-one runs in total, with a batting average of 10.33. Moline also bowled underarm right-arm slow, but he was not called upon to bowl in his first-class career. He died in Lynton, Devon.
