= Jaroslav Malina =

Jaroslav Malina may refer to:

- Jaroslav Malina (scenographer) (1937–2016), Czech scenographer
- Jaroslav Malina (anthropologist) (born 1945), Czech archaeologist and anthropologist
