= Antoni Milina =

Croatian footballer

Personal information
- Date of birth: 20 December 1989 (age 36)
- Place of birth: Croatia
- Position: Goalkeeper

Senior career*
| Years | Team | Apps | (Gls) |
| -2008 | Excelsior Mouscron | 0 | (0) |
| 2008-2010 | Cádiz B | 0 | (0) |
| 2010-2011 | Primorac Stobreč | | |
| 2011-2013 | Imotski | 32 | (0) |
| 2013 | Tammeka Tartu | 0 | (0) |
| 2013 | Val Kaštel Stari | | |
| 2013 | Real Aranjuez | 0 | (0) |
| 2013-2014 | Zmaj Blato | | |
| 2014 | Lučko | | |
| 2014-2015 | Zmaj Blato | | |
| 2015-2016 | Hrvace | | |
| 2016-2018 | Župa Dubrovačka Čibača | | |
| 2018 | Lokomotiv Plovdiv | 10 | (0) |
| 2018 | Zmaj Blato | | |
| 2020 | Slaven Gruda | | |
| 2020-2021 | Imotski | | |
| 2021 | Croatia Gabrile | | |
| 2022- | Zmaj Blato | | |
- * Club domestic league appearances and goals

Antoni Milina (Bulgarian: Антони Милина; born 20 December 1989 in Croatia) is a Croatian footballer who last played for BŠK Zmaj in his home country.

== Career ==
Milina started his senior career with R.E. Mouscron. In 2018, he signed for PFC Lokomotiv Plovdiv in the Bulgarian First Professional Football League, where he made ten league appearances and scored zero goals. After that, he played for BŠK Zmaj.

== Personal life ==
Milina is younger brother of former goalkeeper Jure Milina
