= Jure Milina =

Croatian footballer (born 1987)

Personal information
- Date of birth: 8 January 1987 (age 39)
- Place of birth: Croatia
- Height: 1.89 m (6 ft 2 in)
- Position: Goalkeeper

Youth career
- NK Jadran KS

Senior career*
Years	Team	Apps	(Gls)
-2006	Mosor		
2006-2008	Kamen Ingrad	1	(0)
2008-2009	HNK Val		
2009-2010	Ponikve		
2010	Hrvace		
2010-2012	GOŠK Kaštel Gomilica		
2012	Imotski	0	(0)
2019-	Adriatic	6	(0)
- * Club domestic league appearances and goals

Jure Milina (born 8 January 1987) is a Croatian former footballer who played as goalkeeper.

== Career ==
=== NK Mosor ===
NK Mosor is Milina’ s first senior club. He was one of key players in NK Mosor's quest in staying in 04/05 2. HNL and 05/06 2.HNL.

=== NK Kamen Ingrad ===
Milina came from NK Mosor to 1.HNL side NK Kamen Ingrad in 06/07 1.HNL.

He made one appearance in last (33.) round of 06/07 1.HNL vs HNK Rijeka when Kamen Ingrad lost 2–0 on Rijeka's stadium Kantrida. He entered the match in 55’ minute of second half while the score was 0-0. The two goals were scored by Nino Bule and Ivan Sertić

Milina stayed only one more season in Kamen Ingrad because it was the last season of Kamen Ingrad's existence. The club was dissolved in 2008. Milina made no appearances.

=== NK Val ===
Jure Milina signed for NK Val in the start of 2008/09 3. HNL. He made all 30 appearances. Unfortunately NK Val was relegated.

=== NK Ponikve ===
Next season Milina signed for 1. ŽNL side NK Ponikve from Zagreb. He stayed there half a year until 1 January 2010. NK Ponikve finished 7th that season.

=== NK Hrvace ===
Milina's new club from 1 January 2010 is 3. HNL side NK Hrvace. He stayed there until the end of 2009/10 season when Hrvace finished 7th.

=== NK GOŠK Kaštel Gomilica ===
At the start of 2010/11 season Milina signed for NK GOŠK from Kaštel Gomilica. He stayed there for one and a half year until he joined NK Imotski.

=== NK Imotski ===
Milina joined club that was home of his younger brother Antoni Milina, 2. HNL side NK Imotski in February 2012. He made 0 appearances while his brother Antoni made 29 appearances. NK Imotski had financial problems and players didn't receive their wages. NK Imotski was Milina's last club. Milina retired at the age of 25.

== Personal life ==
Milina is older brother of Antoni Milina
