= Melina Turk =

Canadian squash player

Personal information
- Born: Winnipeg, Manitoba

Sport
- Country: Canada
- Handedness: right-handed
- Racquet used: Dunlop

Women's singles
- Highest ranking: 88 (February 2016)

Melina Turk is a Canadian former professional squash player who currently serves as a squash coach following her retirement from the sport in 2016. She was coached by her father Gene Turk who also served as a former head coach of Canada men's squash team. Melina also played squash in junior level competitions for Dartmouth College in US. She achieved her highest career singles ranking of 88 in February 2016 during the 2015–16 PSA World Tour.

== Coaching career ==
After ending her playing career on a brief note, she pursued her career as a squash coach similar to her father. She had coaching stints at Westchester Squash Club in New York, Calgary Winter Club in Alberta before moving to Bermuda in late 2018 to coach at Victoria Street Club. Melina is currently residing in Bermuda coaching at The Court House Squash and Wellness in Hamilton.
