= Mălina (name) =

Mălina is a Romanian female given name. Notable people with the name include:

- Mălina Călugăreanu (born 1996), Romanian fencer
- Mălina Olinescu (1974–2011), Romanian singer

== See also ==
- Molina (surname)
