= William Revelli =

American musician, music educator, conductor, and marching band director

Doctor William D. Revelli

Background information
- Born: William Donald Revelli; February 12, 1902; Spring Gulch, Colorado, U.S.
- Died: July 14, 1994 (aged 92) Ann Arbor, Michigan, U.S.
- Genres: Classical; Marching Band
- Occupations: Musician, music educator, conductor, and marching band director
- Instrument: Violin
- Years active: 1912–1994

Hobart High School Band Director
- In office 1925–1935

University of Michigan Director of Bands
- In office 1935–1971
- Preceded by: Bernard Hirsch
- Succeeded by: George R. Cavender

Personal details
- Resting place: Washtenong Memorial Park, Ann Arbor, Michigan, Michigan, U.S.
- Education: Beethoven Conservatory of Music, Chicago Musical College, Vandercook School of Music, and Columbia School of Music D.M.

William Donald Revelli (February 12, 1902 – July 16, 1994) was an American music educator and conductor best known for his association with the University of Michigan, where he directed the university's bands including the Michigan Marching Band 1935 to 1971. During his 36 years as director, the Michigan Marching Band won international acclaim for its musical precision. Revelli is also credited with innovations that moved college marching bands across the country away from rigid military formations. Among other things, Revelli's Michigan Marching Band was the first to synchronize music and movement and the first to use an announcer.

== Early years ==
Born in Spring Gulch, Colorado, Revelli studied violin as a child, graduated from the Beethoven Conservatory of Music in St. Louis, and received degrees from the Chicago Musical College, Columbia School of Music and Vandercook School of Music. He also played in various pit orchestras in Chicago before accepting a high-school conducting job at Hobart High School in Hobart, Indiana, in 1925. Revelli transformed the Hobart High School Band into one of the best small high school bands in the country. He was music director at Hobart from 1925 to 1935, where his bands won either five or six national championships. In 1934, Revelli's Hobart band was invited to play at the World's Fair, and one newspaper reported: "William Revelli has developed his Hobart, Ind., class B band to a point where it is ranked by many with the best class A organizations from larger schools." In 1931, Revelli was paid a salary of $5,000 a year, a large sum at that time.

== University of Michigan ==
=== Overview of career at Michigan ===
William Revelli, 1944

In 1935 Revelli was hired by the University of Michigan as director of bands. Revelli almost decided against applying for the Michigan job because the pay was significantly lower than what he was earning in Hobart, but he did apply for and later accept the job, a position he held for 36 years. Revelli retired in 1972 and was director emeritus until his death in 1994, Under his direction, the Michigan Marching Band was acclaimed for its musical precision, intricate formations and high-stepping style. The Marching Band under Revelli was "the first to score original music to band shows, to synchronize music and movement, to use an announcer, to do a post-game show, and the first to host a high school Band Day."

=== Reputation as taskmaster ===
Known on Michigan's campus as "The Chief", Revelli was known as a tough taskmaster. Revelli had a fierce dedication to excellence and drilled the desire for perfection into his band students. One former band member recalled that the "sequence of our attitudes toward him often went from fear to anger to respect to awe to reverence.'" Another recalled: "He was a tyrant who was feared by many, and an educator revered by all." One of his students from the 1940s recalled the same emotions but noted: "I learned more about music-making in that little class ... than I had learned in my prior 12 years of private lessons." It has been said that, if asked, "nearly every student who played under Revelli could vividly recount some memory of him; he left a lasting impression on everyone with whom he crossed paths."

Interviewed in 1970, Revelli said: "I've been called the Vince Lombardi of Ann Arbor because I just won't compromise. I'm intolerable when it comes to perfection. Sometimes I'm even downright mean about it." Revelli added that his pursuit of perfection was about more than the music: "This striving for perfection will carry over into other areas of their lives." In December 1964, Revelli described the guiding principles that he sought to instill into his students for 36 years. In a speech delivered to the Marching Band prior to its appearance at the 1965 Rose Bowl game (and published in its entirety in the October 1994 issue of Michigan's alumni magazine Michigan Today), Revelli said:

"Demand of yourself! How much do you demand of yourself of what I'm talking about? Not even 10 percent, some of you. ... I want to know how you can dedicate yourself to your forthcoming positions in the musical world, when you can't dedicate yourself right now to what you're doing in a simple little march. ... The world is full of people who do things just about right. Just about. And a few on the top do them just right—most of the time. Nobody's perfect! When are you going to start to demand of yourself what I demand of myself? When are you going to be as uncompromising with what you do as I am uncompromising in what I hear and what I insist on? When? Are you waiting for some miracle? The miracle will be when you demand of yourself everything you've got of yourself. That'll be the day. And I don't only mean 5 minutes of 10; I mean 10 minutes out of 10; I mean 60 minutes out of an hour, 24 hours a day, at least all of your waking hours. ... I don't want it just about right! To me, just about right is terrible! ... Now, nobody's killed when you play a half-note as a dotted quarter. But you might, from learning to play a half-note a full half-note, make the difference in the lives of 50,000 little kids. ... You don't piddle with music—it's a good-time-Charlie business, and for me, the wonderful good times come out of hearing somebody play beautifully. I don't care if it's 'Stars and Stripes,' 'The Victors' or what it is. I mean, there's a pride. And this guy knows he's good! And nobody can take that away from him. When they play sloppy and don't care or don't know—a great many of them don't even know, they don't know how bad it is—they can be forgiven, but more they should be pitied."

Revelli also viewed school bands as a bulwark against juvenile delinquency. He noted: "We keep our musicians too interested and busy to get into mischief." On another occasion, he noted, "Young music students have better things to do than get in trouble."

=== Development of the Michigan Bands ===
William Revelli, 1956

Revelli recruited talented musicians to Michigan like a football coach recruited top athletes. Revelli required all male wind instrument majors to participate in the Marching Band. This requirement swelled the number of students in the Marching Band. Revelli was also known for his use of new music in his performances, often commissioning new pieces. Another innovation during Revelli's years as band director was the introduction of dance steps. The tradition began with a dance routine to the tune Alexander's Ragtime Band which proved to be a big hit with the crowd.

In the 1930s, General Motors divisions, Buick and Chevrolet, paid for the band to travel to away games. In a show of appreciation, Revelli had the band line up in a "Buck – I" formation at the 1938 Ohio State game. Then, while playing Buick's theme song, the letter "I" moved between the "u" and the "c" in "Buck" spelling out "Buick". The next morning, athletic director Fielding H. Yost reportedly called Revelli at his home at 2:00 a.m. and said: "Young man, never do that again!" Yost did not approve of the injection of commercial advertising onto the college football field.

Revelli was also dedicated to furthering musical education in high schools. He regularly toured the Midwest offering band clinics in small towns and big cities. In 1949, Revelli held the first Band Day at Michigan Stadium. Twenty-nine high school bands marched into the stadium and played with the Michigan Marching Band under the direction of Revelli. By the 1960s, the number of Band Day participants had grown to more than 14,000. Revelli was also the Chairman of the Instrumental Winds Department at the University of Michigan. He was an advocate within the School of Music for wind music. Aside from directing the large ensembles, Revelli promoted chamber music as well as the importance of private instruction on each student's wind instrument at the university. Starting in 1942, Revelli offered the "Small Wood-wind ensemble", as a way to encourage wind chamber music. The vision of professor Revelli helped bring in teachers for every wind instrument and paved the way for the University of Michigan to become one of the premiere music institutions in the United States.

In 1946, the band moved to Harris Hall. Revelli joked that the band was making "progress" as it moved from a building built in 1854—Morris Hall—to one built in 1888. The large upstairs room with its plaster walls and wooden floor provided the perfect acoustical setting for a band rehearsal. Revelli later said the "Michigan Band sound" was in part due to the perfect acoustics of Harris Hall and Hill Auditorium.

In 1961, Revelli and the U-M Symphony Band, under sponsorship of the U.S. State Department, toured the Soviet Union, Romania, Egypt, Greece, and five other Near East countries for 15 weeks. One of the attendees at the USSR concert in Minsk, USSR - according to the Warren Commission report - was none other than Lee Harvey Oswald - the reported assassin of John F. Kennedy. On other tours, the Symphony Band under Revelli appeared at Carnegie Hall in New York, the Philadelphia Academy of Music, Boston Symphony Hall, and the Shrine Auditorium in Detroit.

=== Revelli teaches "The Victors" to the football team ===
Revelli on Michigan Stadium game program, October 1970

When Bo Schembechler was hired as Michigan's football coach in 1969, Revelli was the first person to visit him when he arrived at his new office: "I'm in my office, and the first visitor that I get, the absolute first visitor is William D. Revelli." Revelli sat down and said, "I want you to know that I coach my band exactly the same way you coach your football team. We'll have discipline, and we'll do it the way it's supposed to be done!" Revelli added, "Anything you need from me or the band, all you need to do is ask."

When the freshmen football players arrived in the fall of 1969, Schembechler took Revelli up on his offer and asked Revelli to teach the freshmen how to sing "The Victors". Schembechler gathered the freshmen at Yost Field House, and Revelli entered in full uniform – described by Schembechler as "a lean, short, distinguished-looking older gentleman—a band director right out of central casting." Schembechler told the freshmen that they were about to learn "about the greatest college fight song from the greatest band director in the history of college football". Revelli rose to the podium, tapped his baton, looked right into their eyes and said, "John Philip Sousa called this the greatest fight song ever written. And you will sing it with respect!" Revelli brought out a pitch pipe and began the instructions. "You sing from down in here, in your diaphragm. You bring it up from down here with feeling." Then he blew the starting note on his pitch pipe. The players started, "Hail to the Victors, valiant –" Revelli interrupted, "No, No, No! That's terrible! There's no enthusiasm. You didn't sing it without enthusiasm!" They started again, and Revelli interrupted again. "No, no, no! We're gonna get this right if I'm here all night!"

Schembechler marveled at how Revelli "had those big lugs in his back pocket" from the moment he took the podium. As he put it, "He didn't just teach them 'The Victors.' He taught them Michigan tradition!" He thought so much of Revelli's performance that he invited him back every year to teach the freshmen what Michigan tradition was about. Schembechler recalled, "He was absolutely great, and the freshmen absolutely loved it. And let me tell you, every one of those freshmen came out of that session with Revelli knowing 'The Victors.' They knew the words, they knew how to sing it, and they knew how to emphasize the right spots. They flat out knew how to do it. And it was only because he came over there with the idea that those guys were going to come out of that meeting room knowing how to sing this fight song the right way or else! And they did. That was Bill Revelli."

The admiration between Revelli and Schembechler was mutual. In a 1970 interview, Revelli compared himself and his training methods to those of Schembechler. "Bo and I speak the same language. Psychologically, our practices are the same. Both the team and the band have to perfect their fundamentals before they can do anything else. And both need proper warmups to stay in shape in the off-season. Sometimes we'll spend 45 minutes on calisthenics of the embouchure (perfecting the position of the lips on the mouthpiece of an instrument). I had one boy come back who hadn't practiced all summer. His lips were about six months behind everyone else's."

== College Band Directors National Association ==
Revelli was the founder of the College Band Directors National Association (CBDNA) in 1941. The CBDNA began as a committee of the Music Educators National Conference (MENC). In the fall of 1938 that committee, under the leadership of Revelli, met independently in Chicago. The group met again in December 1941 and formed the University and College Band Conductors Conference. The name of the organization was changed to the College Band Directors National Association in 1947. Revelli also served as a President of the National Band Association and the American Bandmasters Association, and was named Honorary Life President of the CBDNA.

== National High School Honors Band ==
For the United States 200th Birthday, Congress created the American Revolution Bicentennial Administration (ARBA) who tasked the MENC (Music Educators National Convention) with creating a National Band made up of high school students for several concerts during the Bicentennial celebrations. In 1975, the MENC set up the Bicentennial Commission and started planning the National High School Honors Band.1 With the help of the MEJ (Music Educators Journal), high school band directors were asked to send in applications for only their best musicians who were at or near a professional level of skill to be considered for an audition. Revelli was the only person considered to direct the band. He was asked to conduct and accepted with amendments to the MENC plans for choosing students, among other caveats. While two exceptional senior high school students were to be chosen from every state, Revelli instead picked the best high school musicians, leaving multiple states without representatives and even choosing a student who was only a junior at the time. His requirement for excellence were uncompromising for this most important event, the final performance of which would take place at the Kennedy Center.

The music was chosen from great American composers, including Stars and Stripes Forever by John Philip Sousa, Trittico by Vaclav Nelhybel, as well as The Star-Spangled Banner. Because William Revelli only conducted band and classical music he declined conducting Somewhere by Leonard Bernstein. George Roberts, " Mr. Bass Trombone", accompanied the National High School Honors Band as a soloist in Somewhere as it was nearly impossible for professional musicians. He agreed at Revelli's request even though Bill wasn't conducting Somewhere. The events were considered a great success due to the perfection demanded from William Revelli of the country's finest high school musicians and a fitting tribute to the nation. The success spurred "National High School Honors Bands" popping up across the country in the years following the 1976 Bicentennial, although none are considered to be close to the success of Revelli's Bicentennial Band.

== Revelli International School of Music ==
In the 1970s, Revelli headed a school in Glion/Montreux Switzerland called the Revelli International School of Music. High School students from various states attended for a short time and then toured through various countries in Europe.

== Awards and honors ==
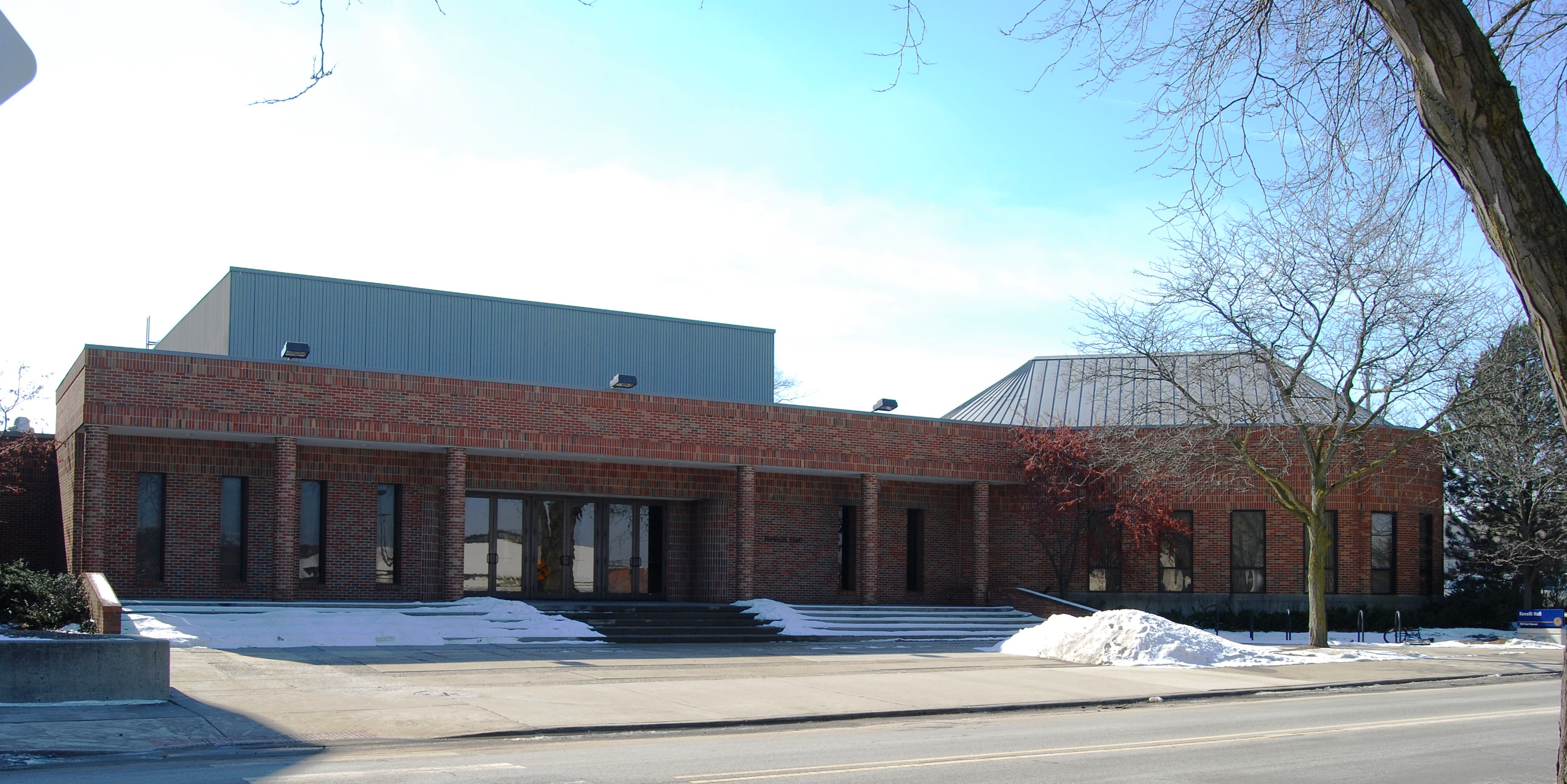
Revelli Hall

Revelli received numerous awards and honors for his contributions to marching band music, music education, and the University of Michigan. These honors include:

- In 1947, the Chicago Musical College conferred the honorary degree of Doctor of Music on Revelli.
- In 1949, at the Twelfth Biennial Convention of Kappa Kappa Psi, National Honorary Fraternity for College Bandsmen, Revelli was honored by being elected to the position of Grand Honorary President, "an honor seldom given and one of the highest honors that could be bestowed upon any conductor or member of the fraternity."
- In 1961, the University of Michigan presented Revelli with the faculty award for distinguished achievement.
- In 1964, Revelli was honored as one of the first ten recipients of Kappa Kappa Psi's Distinguished Service to Music Medal.
- In the 1970s, the Michigan Marching Band moved its first dedicated facility. The building, located at 350 East Hoover, was named William Revelli Hall.
- In 1981, Revelli was among the first living inductees to the National Band Association Hall of Fame of Distinguished Band Conductors.
- In 1989, the Louis Sudler Foundation and the John Philip Sousa Foundation presented Revelli with their highest award, the Order of Merit.
- In 1989, Troy State University (now Troy University) conferred the honorary degree of Doctor of Laws on Revelli.
- In 1994, he was posthumously awarded the Charles E. Lutton Man of Music Award by Phi Mu Alpha Sinfonia fraternity for men of music at its national convention in St. Louis, Missouri. The award was accepted on his behalf by his grandson. He had been initiated by the Fraternity's Alpha Lambda chapter at Illinois Wesleyan University in 1935.

== Death and family ==
Revelli died of heart failure on July 16, 1994, at St. Joseph Mercy Hospital in Ann Arbor at age 92. He was preceded in death by his wife, Mary, and his daughter, Rosemary Margaret Revelli Strong. He is survived by his grandson John William Revelli Strong and Kimberly (Strong) Snyder, and his great-grandchildren Sara and William Snyder. He is interred at Washtenaw Memorial Park in Ann Arbor.

== See also ==
- Michigan Marching Band
- University of Michigan
- Marching band
