= Robert Longfield =

American composer

Robert "Bob" Longfield is an American composer, arranger, conductor and educator, best known for his compositions for concert band and string orchestra. He is currently the music director of the Greater Miami Symphonic Band.

== Early life and education ==
Longfield was born and raised in Grand Rapids, Michigan. He graduated with honors from the University of Michigan where he studied with Jerry Bilik and Paul Boylan, and was a member of the band under William D. Revelli and George R. Cavender where he played saxophone. He received his master's degree in Music Education from the University of Miami where he was a student and personal friend of Alfred Reed.

== Career ==
For fifteen years, Longfield was the band and orchestra director at Davison High School in Davison, Michigan. Since 1987, he has held a similar position at Miami Palmetto Senior High School in Pinecrest, Florida. Longfield was the recipient of the Teacher of the Year Award by the Michigan School Band and Orchestra Association. In 1996, he received the Mr. Holland Award from the National Academy of Recording Arts and Sciences and Sciences for outstanding contributions to music education.

A member of ASCAP, Longfield has received several commissions and his compositions and arrangements have been played and recorded by bands throughout the United States as well as in Europe and Japan.

In honor of Longfield's accomplishments, Miami-Dade County officially recognizes April 5, 2006 as Robert Longfield Day.

== Selected compositions and arrangements ==
Music for concert band:

- Hallelujah Chorus (from "The Messiah")
- Allegretto
- Cross Current
- America
- The Avengers
- Downton Abbey (arrangement)
- Purple Twilight
- Eine Kleine "Pop" Music
- El Camino Real (arrangement)
- El Relicario (arrangement)
- Freedom, Justice, Honor
- In Glory Triumphant
- In Quest of Excellence
- Italian Holiday
- Menuetto
- Passacaglia on an Old English Carol
- Russian Sailor Dance
- Rapp's Woods Ramble
- Oblivion (arrangement)
- Sanctuary
- Symphony No.2 in C minor
- Take the Blues Train
- The Abduction from Seraglio
- The Honor Roll
- The Hounds of Spring (arrangement)
- The "X" Brigade
- Turkish March
- When Summer's in the Meadow
- Where Valor Proudly Sleeps
- Vortex
- Fanfare for a Celebration
- Fanfare for the Common Man (arrangement)

Music for string orchestra:

- American Heritage Suite No. 1
- Fugue No. 5 in D Major
- Intrigue (A Tangoed Web)
- Over the Waves
- Plaisir d'amour
- Prelude in E Minor
- Rondo in Blue
- The Skaters' Waltz
- The Journey of the Magi
- When Summer's in the Meadow
- The Godfather (Love Theme)
- Turning Point
- Vortex (there is also an orchestra form)
- Music from Frozen
- La La Land Medley
