= Varsity (fight song) =

Fight song of the University of Michigan

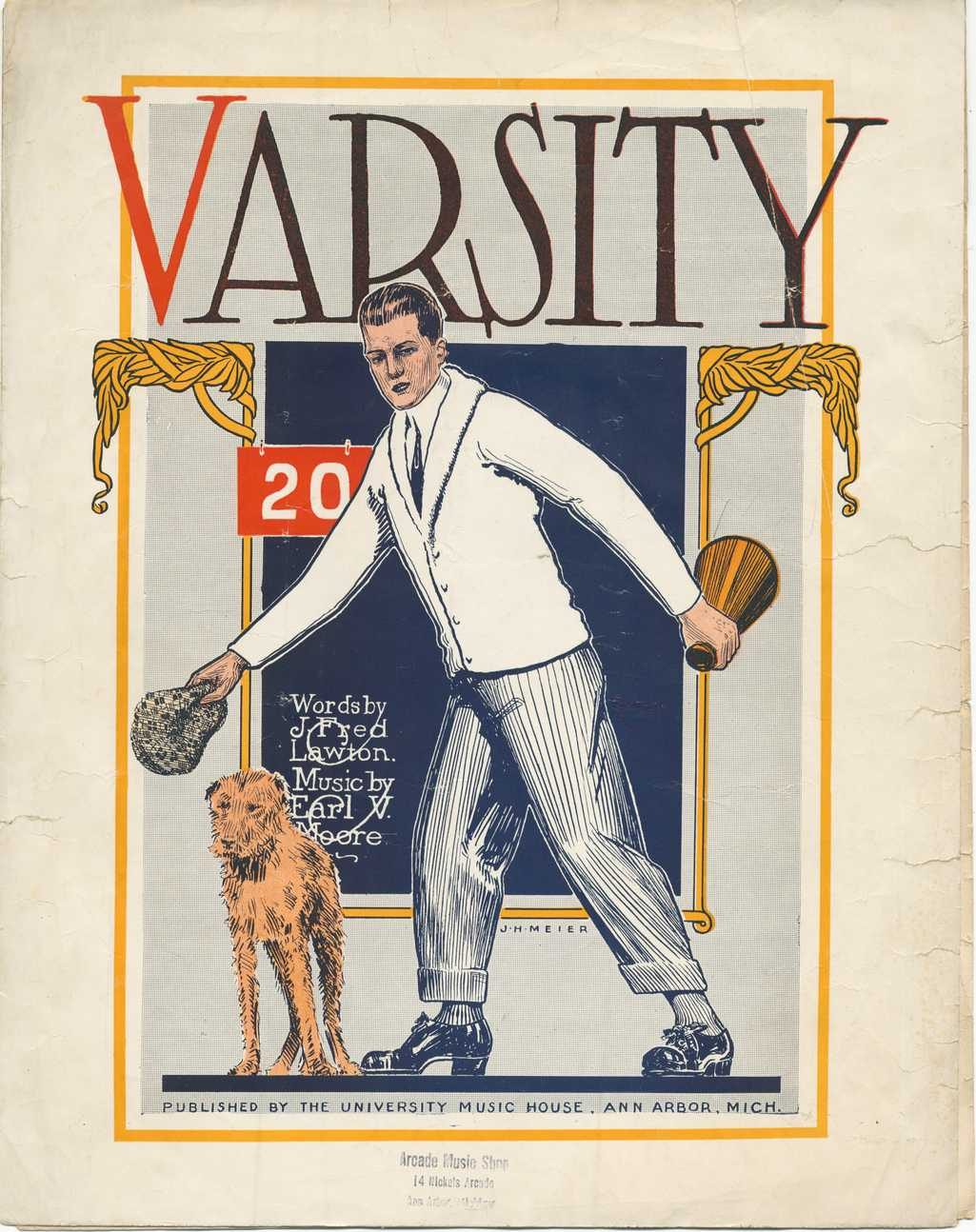
- Fight song of the University of Michigan
- Lyrics: J. Fred Lawton, 1911
- Music: Earl Vincent Moore, 1911
- Adopted: 1911

Audio sample
- file; help

"Varsity" is a fight song of the University of Michigan.

== History ==
It was composed by two Michigan students, J. Fred Lawton and Earl Vincent Moore, while they were riding a street car in Detroit in 1911. Lawton had graduated from Michigan in June 1911, and met Moore in Detroit that October. Moore suggested to Lawton that the university needed a new fight song, and that the two of them should create it. Lawton wrote the lyrics while Moore composed the music for the song.

"Varsity" was written in 1911 as a replacement for "The Victors", which includes the line "Champions of the West" that no longer applied to Michigan athletics after the university departed the Western Conference. Michigan football coach Fielding H. Yost pulled Michigan out of the conference in 1907 due to changes made to its recruiting and eligibility rules, and the football team played as an independent for the next decade before rejoining what ultimately became the Big Ten Conference. According to University of Michigan music historian Joseph Dobos, "The Victors" had all but disappeared from campus in the 1900s, and the most popular songs at football games and pep rallies were the alma mater, "The Yellow and Blue", and a modified version of "Hot Time in the Old Town Tonight" that included Michigan-specific lyrics.

"Varsity" was first played at a Friday night pep rally held at University Hall on October 6, 1911, where Michigan Marching Band director Eugene Fischer heard it and agreed to play it the very next day during the football team's game against Case. It is likely that Fischer made his own band arrangement of the song overnight. After the performance of "Varsity" at halftime of the Case game, The Michigan Daily called it "stirring" and opined that it would become "one of Michigan's most popular songs". It was featured in the song book Michigan’s Favorite College Songs in 1913, the third and final major song book to be produced by the university.

In 1917, "The Victors" began being played again as Michigan returned to the Western Conference, and it surpassed "Varsity" in popularity during the 1920s. In 1951, the "M Fanfare", the university fanfare, was composed from both of Michigan's fight songs, "Varsity" and "The Victors", as well as its alma mater, "The Yellow and Blue".

In 1969, Lawton, aged 81, collapsed and died just outside Michigan Stadium following a football game against Wisconsin during which he guest conducted the Michigan Marching Band in playing "Varsity". The marching band continues to play the song regularly at Michigan football games.

== Lyrics ==
Men of Michigan onto victory, Ev'ry man in ev'ry play.
Michigan expects her Varsity to win today!
Rah! Rah! Win for Michigan!
Varsity, Down the field.
Never yield, Raise high our shield.
March on to victory for Michigan,
And the Maize and Blue.
Oh Varsity, We're for you,
Here for you to cheer for you.
We have no fear for you. Oh Varsity!
