= J. Fred Lawton =

Michigan poet

- Born: J. Fred Lawton; January 26, 1888; Ridgetown, Ontario
- Died: November 1, 1969 (aged 81); Ann Arbor, Michigan
- Education: University of Michigan
- Occupations: Lyricist; writer; businessman
- Spouse: Marjorie Newton
- Children: George F. Lawton, J. Fred Lawton, Jr.

J. Fred Lawton (January 26, 1888 – November 1, 1969; full name James Frederick Lawton) was a lyricist, poet, and businessman active in the greater Detroit area who was closely associated with the University of Michigan for most of his life.

== Life and career ==
Born in Ridgetown, Ontario, to Thomas Morrison Lawton and Jane Green Lawton, Fred Lawton moved to Michigan in 1894. The family settled in Detroit, where, in 1900, Thomas and his relations became American citizens. Thomas was a physician, and Fred was raised in an upper-class family that valued education. After graduating from Central High School (Detroit), he enrolled at the University of Michigan, graduating in 1911 with a bachelor's degree from the Literary College. On December 14, 1912, he married Marjorie Newton; the couple had two sons, Fred Jr. Lawton and George F. Lawton. Fred worked for two years in the Detroit Juvenile Courts and then entered the insurance business, working for fifty years with the Connecticut Mutual Life Insurance Co. He lived in Detroit until 1924 and then moved to the suburb of Berkley, where he was active in civic organisations ranging from the Boy Scouts to the Board of Education.

The University of Michigan was a central part of Lawton's life for sixty years. While a student, he wrote the lyrics for at least two college musicals, Koanzaland (1909) and The Crimson Chest (1910). The score to the first was issued by Jerome H. Remick, a national publisher; the second was published locally by The University Company. His musical partner for both shows was Earl V. Moore, and in 1911 Lawton and Moore produced "Varsity," which quickly became a University of Michigan fight song. Lawton played football under legendary coach Fielding H. Yost (as did his brother, George M. Lawton), and in 1947 Fred published a memoir of sorts, "Hurry Up" Yost in Story and Song. He also published a collection of poetry in 1959, Roses That Bloomed in the Snow; the title poem reflects on the "snow bowl" victory that led to Michigan's 1951 Rose Bowl triumph.

In addition to the lyrics written for student shows, Lawton wrote about half a dozen incidental songs. Three were notable responses to World War I: "He Was a Soldier from the U. S. A. (Fighting for His Native Land)," "Say—You Haven't Sacrificed at All," and "H-O-M-E Spells Where I Long to Be." Music for the latter two was written by Will E. Dulmage, who went on to a successful career in the entertainment industry. "Say—You Haven't Sacrificed at All" was written for the Third Liberty Loan drive and was performed by fifty-nine women in an "animated song sheet" in October 1918. Lawton played an important part in all of the Detroit Liberty Loan campaigns, receiving a testimonial for his work that is now among his papers at the Bentley Historical Library.

J. Fred Lawton died of a heart attack at the age of 81, immediately after a Michigan football game at which he had conducted the University of Michigan marching band in a performance of the fight song he had created.

== Selected works ==
- Koanzaland. 1909. Donald A. Kahn, book and lyrics; J. Fred Lawton, lyrics; Earl V. Moore and Robert T. Moreland, music.
- "Varsity". 1911. Earl V. Moore, music. Ann Arbor, MI: University Music House.
- "He Was a Soldier From the U. S. A. (Fighting for His Native Land)". 1914. Howard Kocian, music. St. Louis, MO: Buck & Lowney.
- "Say—You Haven't Sacrificed at All". 1918. Will E. Dulmage, music. Battle Creek, MI: Chas. E. Roat Music Co.
- "Hurry Up" Yost in Story and Song. 1947. Ann Arbor: J. W. Edwards
