= Let's Go Blue =

Song for the University of Michigan

Song
- Written: 1973-4?
- Genre: Fight song
- Length: 0:40
- Composers: Joe Carl, Albert Ahronheim
- Lyricist: George Cavender

Audio sample
- Sample of University of Michigan's marching band performing the song in 1983: file; help

"Let's Go Blue" is a short song most often associated with the University of Michigan, but widely performed during high school and professional sports as well. It was composed by Joe Carl and first arranged by Albert Ahronheim in the 1970s. The song consists of 32 bars and is 40 seconds long.

== History ==
The melody to "Let's Go Blue" was written by Joe Carl, with various dates given for its composition is 1974 or later, including 1975 and 1976. Carl, who at the time of the song's composition was an undergraduate student at the University of Michigan and tuba player in the Michigan Marching Band, improvised the melody as a "time-out ditty" for use during a hockey game at Yost Ice Arena. The song's simple lyrics were spontaneously created by Michigan band director George Cavender who shouted them in a moment of enthusiasm after the song had been performed several times; the lyrics quickly caught on with the crowd. The song was subsequently arranged for band by Albert Ahronheim and, according to one source, first performed at a football game in September 1975 when Michigan played Stanford University. Another source claims the first football performance of the song occurred in November 1976 against Purdue University.

The song "went viral" after it was played by the Michigan Marching Band during the national telecast of the 1976 Orange Bowl. Sheet music for the song was published in 1978 followed by an organ version in 1983.

College	Cheer
Louisville	"Go Cards Go"
DePaul	"Go Team Go"
Syracuse	"Go S.U. Go"
Oklahoma	"Go Sooner"
Penn State	"Let's Go State"
Purdue	"Go Purdue"
Nebraska	"Go Big Red"
North Carolina State	"Go Big Red"
Virginia Tech	“Go Tech Go”
Univ. of Kentucky	"Go Big Blue"

Since its debut at Michigan, the melody has been used by Pennsylvania State University, DePaul University, Univ. of Kentucky, University of Nebraska–Lincoln, Purdue University, and North Carolina State University, in addition to countless high school and professional sports teams. By 1984, Carl and Ahronheim were each receiving approximately $1,000 annually in ASCAP royalty payments for the song.

A 2013 viral video shows Chicago Blackhawks fans celebrating a recent Stanley Cup shows a fan on a balcony playing the tune on trumpet and leading an impromptu chant of "Let's Go Hawks", followed by a man running in front of the camera and yelling "I'm going to jail!"

== See also ==
- "The Victors"
