= Will E. Dulmage =

American songwriter

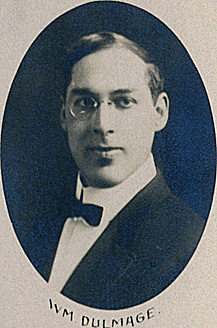
- Photo of Will when he was with Geo. & Wm. Finzel's Orchestra
- Born: August 17, 1883; Holly, Michigan, US
- Died: February 11, 1953 (aged 69); Dearborn, Michigan, US
- Occupations: Composer, lyricist, and music publisher
- Spouse: Nina Bell Tallman
- Children: 1

William E. Dulmage (August 17, 1883 – February 11, 1953) was a lyricist, composer, and music publisher in the first half of the twentieth century. In 1934, he composed "Tigers on Parade," which was dedicated to the Detroit Tigers and Mickey Cochrane. Dulmage wrote popular songs, including some World War I publications, and composed soundtracks for television shows and films.

== Personal life ==
Dulmage was born on August 17, 1883, in Holly, Michigan. Will's high school education was supplemented with private music lessons in Oakland County, Michigan, where he lived with his parents.

Dulmage married Nina Bell Tallman on September 23. The couple had one son together. The family resided in Detroit, Michigan.

Dulmage died on February 11, 1953, in Dearborn, Michigan.

== Career ==
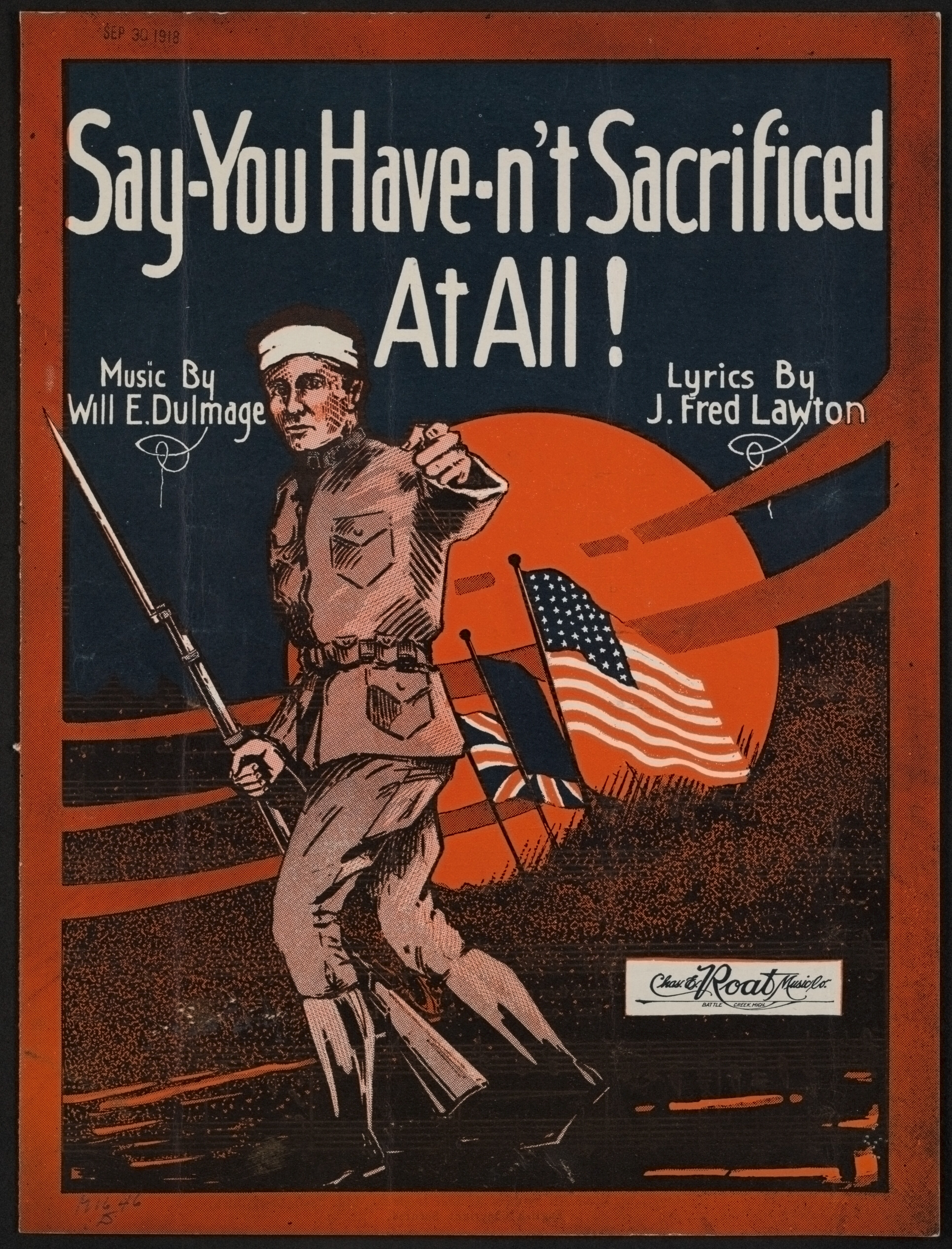
Cover of WWI song composed by Dulmage

At the age of 25, Dulmage began work in the music department at Grinnell Brothers in Detroit. He most likely started off as a song plugger and moved his way up to manager of the Grinnell Brothers' Band and Orchestral department. Dulmage stayed with the company for 22 years. He later joined the Wurlitzer Company, serving as an executive in the sheet music department for twelve years. His wife was also employed at Wurlitzer, but in their accounting department.

Dulmage was a member of the Geo. & Wm Finzel's Band and Orchestra.

Throughout his songwriting career, he collaborated with lyricist Richard W. Pascoe. The two wrote the songs "Tenderly Think of Me" and "When It's Night Time in Nevada." The latter was featured in the movie Night Time in Nevada, which starred Roy Rogers. Besides this film, Dulmage also wrote the soundtracks to The Gene Autry Show (1948) and The Black Rider (1950).

Dulmage was the composer of three World War I songs: Say—You Haven't Sacrificed at All!, H-O-M-E Spells Where I Long to Be, and A Laddie in France is Dreaming, Little Girlie, of You.

In the 1940s, Will was the proprietor of a music store. Each of his family members had a role in the running of the store. His wife worked as the treasurer and his son was a salesman.

In January 1947, Dulmage joined the American Society of Composers, Authors and Publishers.

== Selected works ==
- On the Highway to Galilee: Sacred Song. With H.A. Kelly. 1934. D.L. Schroeder. OCLC 367575761
- When It's Night-Time in Nevada. With Richard W. Pascoe and H. O'Reilly Clint. 1931. Jenkins Music. OCLC 21983861
- Tenderly Think of Me. With Louis Forbstein. 1926. J.W. Jenkins Sons. OCLC 20813677
- Dreaming the Hours Away. 1926. OCLC 497317299
- Faded Love Letters. With Billy Jones, Ernest Hare, Luella Lockwood Moore, and Richard W. Pascoe. 1923. Brunswick. OCLC 269441155
- Say—You Haven't Sacrificed at All!. With J. Fred Lawton. 1918. Chas E. Roat Music Co. OCLC 852379690
- H-O-M-E Spells Where I Long To Be. With Eddie MacGrath and J. Fred Lawton. 1918. Eddie McGrath Publishing Co. OCLC 499088592
- A Laddie in France is Dreaming (Little Girlie of You). With Eddie McGrath. 1918. Eddie McGrath Publishing Co. OCLC 18782784
