= Charles Mills Gayley =

American academic (1858–1932)

- Gayley c. 1890s
- Born: February 22, 1858; Shanghai, China
- Died: July 25, 1932 (aged 74); Berkeley, California
- Citizenship: American
- Education: Blackheath; Royal Belfast Academical Institution; University of Michigan
- Occupations: Professor and Dean
- Years active: 1887-1923
- Employer: University of California
- Known for: English scholar
- Title: Professor Emeritus of the English Language and Literature and Deputy Governor-General of Society of Mayflower Descendants
- Board member of: American University Union in Europe
- Spouse: Sallie Pickett Gayley
- Awards: Chevalier of the Legion of Honour

Charles Mills Gayley (February 22, 1858 – July 25, 1932) was a professor of English, the Classics, and Academic Dean of the University of California at Berkeley between the fall of 1889 and July 1932.

== Biography ==
Gayley was born in Shanghai to Irish-born American Presbyterian missionaries. In 1862, Charles' father (Rev. Samuel Rankin Gayley) became infected with cholera and died. Young Gayley's father was only 34 when he was buried on a hill overlooking the Straits of Pe-chi-li, China. Gayley soon relocated to Ireland with his mother, Sarah, where he was educated at Blackheath school and the Royal Belfast Academical Institution. Charles' stepfather, Rev. Andrew Brown, was pastor of the Presbyterian church at Hollymount, Ireland. Gayley earned his Doctorate at the University of Michigan and briefly served there as an Assistant Professor of English and Latin. While at Michigan, Gayley: (a) composed the Michigan college songs, "The Yellow and Blue" and "Laudes atque Carmina"; (b) developed a love of Shakespeare and poetry; (c) studied one year abroad at the University of Giessen, Hesse-Darmstadt, Germany (emphasizing German, medieval European history, and Modern French History); and (c) accepted what he regarded as a call (within ten minutes of receiving it) to teach in California.

At Berkeley, Gayley was an author, scholar, orator, and widely acclaimed literary critic. He served as University Examiner, Head of the English Department, Dean of Faculties, visiting professor at Oxford, and was a Director of the Commercial Bank of Berkeley. Occasionally, Gayley's lectures were relocated to the outdoor Greek theatre to accommodate overflow students and guests. A persistent advocate of education and idea-sharing, Gayley was instrumental in the development of the University Extension, the College of Commerce, building the Senior Hall, the Stephens Union (on the model of the Oxford Union), bringing Psi Upsilon to Berkeley, and establishing the student volunteers' Ambulance Corps. In 1895, Dr. Gayley composed the famous song "Golden Bear" which begins, "Oh, have you seen the heavens blue, heavens blue", to commemorate the victorious return of the first track team sent east by the University. The song contributed to the selection of the 'golden bear' as the mascot of athletic teams. A staunch patriot, Gayley was also a promoter of US involvement with World War I.

Gayley married Sallie Pickett Harris, daughter of Rt. Rev. Samuel Smith Harris, D.D., LL.D. (1841–1888), who was the second Protestant Episcopal Bishop of Michigan. Gayley first danced with Sallie at the 1888 Ann Arbor "Junior Hop", when their engagement was already rumored. When they met again, at the wedding of Lois Angell and Andrew McLaughlin in 1890, Gayley swore that "he would marry that young lady". The two were married a year later. One of the ushers of the religious ceremony of union was James R. Angell, son of Michigan's President Angell, who later himself became president of Yale University. On November 27, 1892, Gayley was confirmed at St. Mark's Episcopal Church in Berkeley. He immediately began assisting with readings, scripture lessons, and occasionally directed an entire service. When it was known beforehand that Gayley was to read the lessons, University students flocked to St. Mark's. His religious faith was profound. Gayley initiated the Berkeley Canterbury Club as a forum to discuss the application of Christian principles to everyday life; and his academic course, The Bible in English Literature, was popular among students. Gayley died at his home in Berkeley on July 25, 1932.

In 1943, former student Benjamin P. Kurtz authored the professor's biography, Charles Mills Gayley: The Glory of a Lighted Mind.

== Early life ==
Gayley was the eldest son of Rev. Samuel Rankin Gayley and Sarah Sophia Mills. Through his maternal grandmother, Gayley could trace his ancestry to the Mayflower through Thomas Rogers. His father, the son of a Scottish-Irish farmer, had emigrated to the USA due to the Great Famine. Hearing a call, he became a missionary in China, despite warnings that his constitution may not withstand the conditions. Samuel and Sarah were married in August 1856, and sailed for China some two months later in October. They arrived in early 1857, barely 119 days later. The next year, on the anniversary of George Washington's birthday, Charles Mills was born, named for his maternal uncle.

Gayley spent his early years in Shanghai, where the family struggled with the heat, illness and the Taiping Rebellion. Both his parents were repeatedly ill with dysentery and cholera, and Charles' younger brother Andrew died of dysentery in November 1860, barely one year old, just three weeks before the birth of his sister, Fannie. In 1861 the family decided to relocate north in the hope of fairer weather. With the American Civil War threatening to curtail money for foreign missionaries, Charles' father got them passage on a ship to Tengzhou, where they established a new mission. Here the family thrived for a time, until the cholera occurred again, killing both Charles' father and sister in 1862.

Charles and his mother left China, intending to sail for the United States to respect his father's final wish. But with the civil war still in progress, Charles' mother Sarah decided first to sail for Ireland, to pay her respects to her dead husbands family. On arrival, she discovered that both parents of her husband had died, her mother-in-law dying days before news of her son's death reached Ireland. Her brother-in-law took her in, and she soon accepted a proposal of marriage from a cousin of Charles' father, Reverend Andrew Brown. The new family settled at Brown's church in Hollymount.

== Education and early career ==
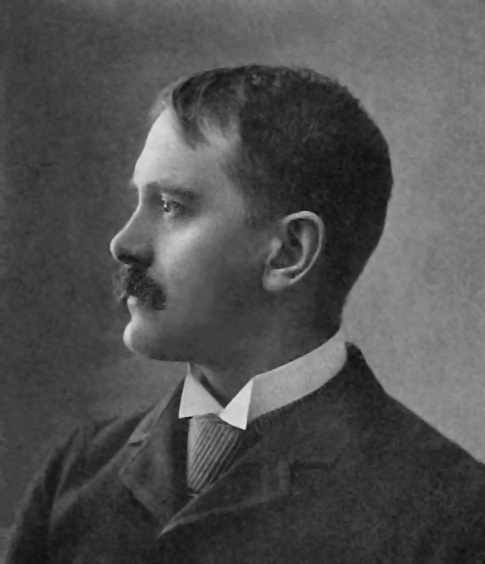
Charles Mills Gayley, c. 1905.

At the age of nine, Gayley was sent to Blackheath Proprietary School in London to be schooled, and at sixteen he studied at the Royal Belfast Academical Institution, Belfast. He excelled in both English and the classics, and graduated with honours, winning a place at Cambridge University. Gayley planned to study to be a Presbyterian clergyman, like his father and stepfather. The arrival of his great-uncle changed his aspirations, declaring that Charles, as an American citizen, should be educated in the United States. With his mother eventually giving her approval, Gayley left Ireland for the University of Michigan, there to study law. Gayley again excelled in both Latin and Greek, but now he developed a passion for Shakespeare. After attending a performance of Romeo and Juliet, Gayley found the work affected him in a way it had not done previously, and he began reading and re-reading the complete works and attending performance after performance. His energy and ability were such that in 1878 he was offered the position as Principal at the high school in Muskegon. Within two years Gayley returned to the University of Michigan as a teacher of Latin.

Graduates of Gayley's Latin classes at Michigan include Arba Seymour Van Valkenburgh and Walter Miller, who, recalling Gayley as a teacher, said "[i]t would be hard to decide whether Gayley was a better teacher of Latin than of English. He was supreme in both. And he was a great teacher of English when he was teaching Latin.". In 1884, Gayley was made assistant professors of Latin, his teaching abilities recognised and rewarded. Although a career as a professor in Latin was indicated for him, Gayley was eager to pursue his interest in poetry.

In 1886, he managed to get a poem accepted for publication in Atlantic Monthly. He was also surprised to win a competition to write a college song for Michigan, receiving the sum of $10 for his composition "The Yellow and Blue". Gayley returned to Ireland during every summer intermission, and spoke passionately about Irish matters. After a speech of his praising Gladstone's Home Rule Bill was received favourably, it was arranged that Gayley would meet with Irish liberals in London. Here Gayley encountered Thomas Power O'Connor, and with the pair beginning an immediate rapport, Gayley agreed to make speeches across Ireland during the summer of 1886, much to the consternation of his stepfather and cousins.

He received the honorary Doctor of Laws (DLL) from the University of Glasgow in June 1901.

In 1904, Gayley, along with Clement Calhoun Young, published The Principles and Progress of English Poetry. The book was published and distributed by the Macmillan Company. In his honor, streets on the UC Berkeley and UC Los Angeles campuses are named after him, as is Mount Gayley in California's Sierra Nevada.

== Publications ==
- Classic Myths in English Literature, 1893.
- Representative English Comedies, vol. i. 1903, vol. ii. 1913, vol. iii. 1914
- The Star of Bethlehem, 1903.
- Poetry of the People: Ballads, Lays of Heroism, and National Songs with Martin C. Flaherty, 1903.
- The Principles and Progress of English Poetry with Clement Calhoun Young, 1904.
- Plays of our Forefathers, 1907.
- Idols of Education, 1910.
- The Classic Myths in English Literature and in Art, 1911
- Beaumont the Dramatist, 1914.
- Shakespeare and the Founders of Liberty in America, 1917.
