= George R. Cavender =

American music educator, marching band director (1919–2004)

Major George R. Cavender
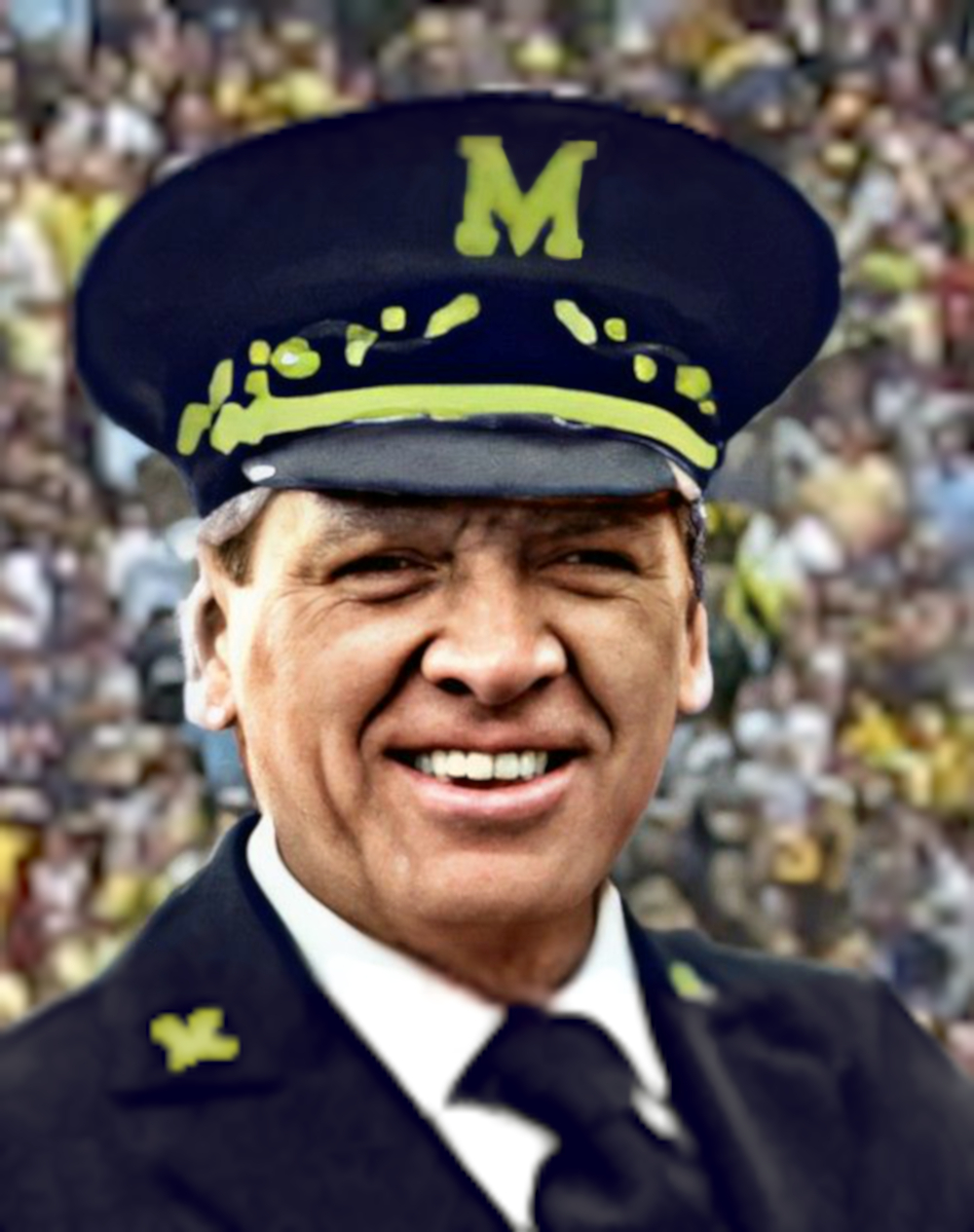

Background information
- Born: George Rudolph Cavender; October 10, 1919; Wakefield, Michigan, U.S.
- Died: March 2, 2004 (aged 84) Ann Arbor, Michigan, U.S.
- Genres: Classical; marching band
- Occupations: Musician, music educator, conductor, and marching band director
- Instruments: Violin, percussion
- Years active: 1952–1990
- Formerly of: Michigan Marching Band

University of Michigan Assistant Director of Bands
- In office 1952–1971

University of Michigan Director of Bands
- In office 1971–1975
- Preceded by: William D. Revelli
- Succeeded by: H. Robert Reynolds

Michigan Marching Band Director
- In office 1971–1979
- Preceded by: William D. Revelli
- Succeeded by: Glenn Richter

President of The Big Ten Band Directors Association
- In office 1971–1972
- Preceded by: Office established
- Succeeded by: Frederick C. Ebbs

Personal details
- Resting place: Fort Custer National Cemetery, Augusta, Michigan, U.S.
- Education: Northern Michigan College of Education
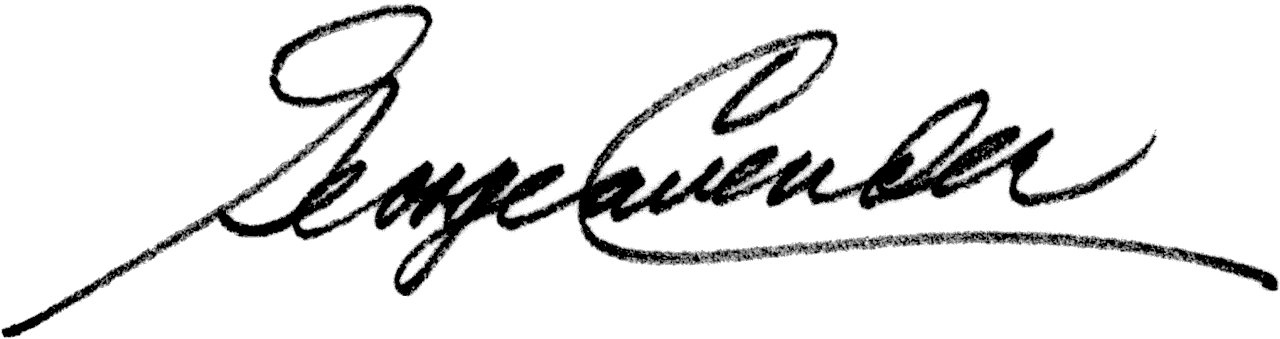
- Signature

George Rudolph Cavender Jr. (/ˈkæ.vɛn.dər/ October 10, 1919 – March 2, 2004) was an American music educator and director associated with the University of Michigan, where he led the university's bands, including the Michigan Marching Band, from 1952 until 1978, first as Assistant Director and then as Director. During those twenty-six years, Cavender worked closely with William Revelli to develop the Michigan Band into a globally recognized performance group.

== Early life and education (1919–1941) ==
Cavender was born in Wakefield, Michigan, in 1919, the only son of George and Emma Cavender. In 1941, he earned a bachelor's degree from Northern Michigan College of Education.

== Military service (1942–1946) ==
During World War II, Cavender attained the rank of Major while serving in the U.S. Marine Corps, commanding a group of tanks in the South Pacific. He received multiple commendations during his 29-month deployment which included the Bougainville campaign, Second Battle of Guam, and the Battle of Iwo Jima.

== Public education (1946–1951) ==
After the war, Cavender returned to the University of Michigan in 1946 and enrolled in the School of Music as a violinist. He joined the band as a percussionist. There, he received his M.Mus. degree in 1947. After earning his master's degree, Cavender served as the Director of Instrumental Music in Ypsilanti Public Schools until 1951. He then decided to pursue a faculty position at the University of Michigan.

== Assistant Director of the University of Michigan Bands (1952–1971) ==
As a newly hired faculty member, Cavender served as an instructor of music and was appointed Assistant Director of the University of Michigan Bands in 1952. He rose to the position of assistant professor in 1957, followed by associate professor in 1962, and then professor in 1966. He retained his Assistant Directorship until he was promoted to Director of Bands in 1971.

On September 27, 1958, Revelli and Cavender organized and conducted a massed band consisting of over 12,000 musicians.

Cavender played a significant role, including logistical support, on the University of Michigan Symphony Band's 15-week performance tour of the Soviet Union, Eastern Europe, and the Middle East in 1961.

Cavender was a member of Kappa Kappa Psi, Phi Mu Alpha Sinfonia, Phi Beta Mu, the American Bandmasters Association, the College Band Directors National Association, the Music Educators National Conference, and the Michigan School Band and Orchestra Association. In 1969, he was commissioned a Kentucky Colonel in gratitude for his services to Northern Kentucky high school bands.

== Director of the University of Michigan Bands (1971–1975) ==
Upon Revelli's retirement in 1971, Cavender became Director of Bands at the University of Michigan. He continued to serve in that role until 1975, when H. Robert Reynolds was named as his successor.

Also in 1971, Cavender founded the Big Ten Band Directors Association and became its first president.

Cavender is credited with creating the simple lyrics of "Let's Go Blue" in a moment of enthusiastic improvisation after the song had been played several times at a hockey game in Yost Ice Arena.

== Director of the Michigan Marching Band (1971–1979) ==
=== Pursuing improvements ===
Dr. Revelli's retirement in 1971 also led to Cavender becoming Director of the MMB that summer. During his tenure as the Director of the MMB, Cavender strove to build upon the band's success achieved in the preceding decades. He continually experimented with show elements, instrument placement, marching techniques, and uniform designs in pursuit of continuous improvement. A former member of the marching band under Cavender's direction noted that he "accomplished a lot through intimidation and humiliation".

=== Title IX ===
After the passage of the Education Amendments of 1972 which included Title IX, Cavender oversaw the integration of women into the Michigan Marching Band in 1972. Until that time, only men had participated in the marching band. Officially, the rule prohibiting female participation had been dropped when Cavender succeeded Revelli on July 1, 1971. When asked about it during an interview for The Michigan Daily, Cavender took sole credit for the change, describing it as a "program of action, not reaction. When a tradition denies a person his basic rights, then that tradition is made to be broken, I owe every qualified student an opportunity to play in the band if he wants to." News of the change was slow to reach students. When asked why he thought more women had not auditioned for the band, Cavender replied, "Gals aren't as interested in any activity as violently physical as marching." He then went on to say, "I don't paint a candy-coated picture of what being in the marching band is like. We don't coddle and we don't baby. We never have... If we have a girl in the band, it will be because she can play well. She won't be a token."

=== Other achievements ===
Keeping the Michigan Marching Band in the national spotlight, Cavender directed the band's performance at Super Bowl VII in 1973. Cavender championed the fund-raising efforts needed to build a modern practice facility for the band, Revelli Hall. He also helped get the name of the MMB's practice field changed from Wines Field to Elbel Field. This was the first campus property to be named in honor of the man who wrote "The Victors".

=== Passing the baton ===
At the conclusion of Cavender's time as Director of the Marching Band, Glenn Richter succeeded him in 1979. Cavender was the last person at the University of Michigan to serve simultaneously as the Director of Bands and the Director of the Marching Band.

== Senior faculty (1976–1990) ==
Cavender became the School of Music's Director of Development and School Relations in 1976 and served in that capacity until 1982 when he took on the new role of Coordinator of Special Events which he held until 1990.

== Retirement, awards, and honors (1990–2004) ==
In 1982, the Northern Michigan University Alumni Association honored Cavender with its Distinguished Alumni Award.

On May 1, 1990, the Regents of the University of Michigan named Cavender a Professor Emeritus of Music just prior to his retirement from faculty life on May 31 of that same year.

A Michigan Marching Band scholarship is named in honor of George Cavender.

The George R. Cavender Tower, an observation tower built at Elbel Field is also named in Cavender's honor.

== Personal life ==
George was married to Florence. He had a son named David, a daughter named Patricia, and several grandchildren including Brendan Cavender, Carly Cavender, Brian Crick, and Cathleen Crick. He died on March 2, 2004, in Ann Arbor after a prolonged illness. He is buried in Fort Custer National Cemetery.

== Publications ==
- Marching Fundamentals and Techniques for the School Bandsman (co-author), Les Strang Publishing Company, 1961.
- Michigan Band-o-rama Series Field Production Guide [for Marching Bands] · Volume 1, Hugo & Luigi-S. French Music Publications, 1967.
