= Night Time in Nevada =

1948 film

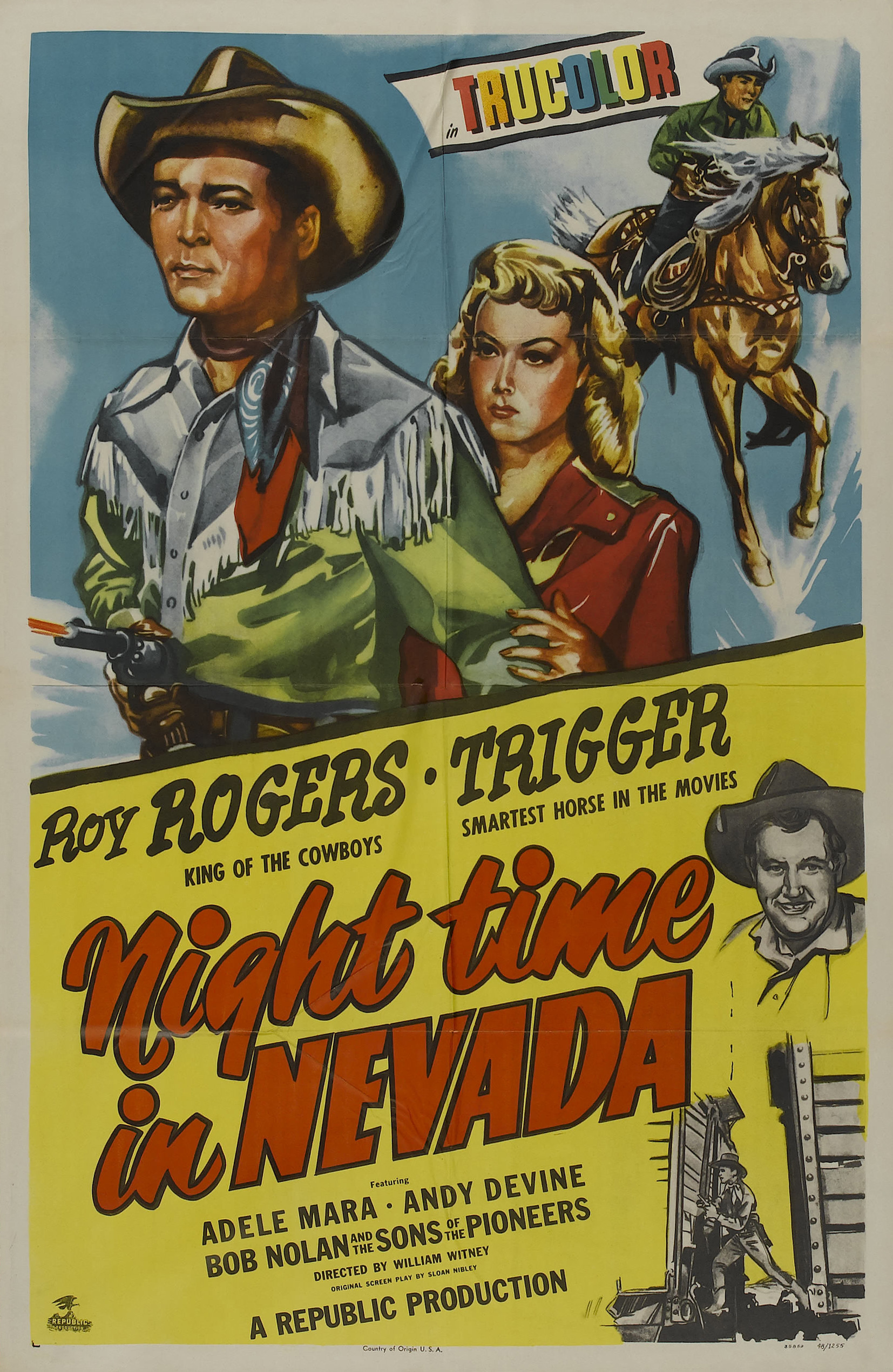
- Theatrical release poster
- Directed by: William Witney
- Written by: Sloan Nibley (writer)
- Produced by: Edward J. White (associate producer)
- Starring: Roy Rogers; Andy Devine
- Cinematography: Jack A. Marta
- Edited by: Tony Martinelli
- Music by: R. Dale Butts; Nathan Scott
- Color process: Trucolor
- Distributed by: Republic Pictures
- Release date: September 5, 1948
- Running time: 67 minutes (original version); 54 minutes (edited version)
- Country: United States
- Language: English

Night Time in Nevada is a 1948 American Western film directed by William Witney and starring Roy Rogers.

== Plot ==
While prospecting for gold Ran Farrell kills his mining partner—Jim Andrews—to keep the money for himself. As Andrews dies, he tells Farrell about money he has deposited for his daughter, Joan, to inherit upon turning eighteen. Farrell then works with an attorney, Jason Howley, to embezzle the money for himself. However, Farrell squanders all of the cash on gambling.

Roy Rogers and his gang have been raising cattle with the intent to sell them via a train operated by their friend, Casey. On the night that the cattle are shipped off the train is held up and Casey is killed.

Upon learning about Casey's death, Rogers goes to town Sheriff Cookie Bullfincher to be deputized, and to help track down the killers. Farrell and his gang secretly held up the train as a means to pay back Joan Andrews who newly arrives to town with her friend, Toni.

Farrell conspires to keep the money as Howley works to delay Joan's receiving the inheritance. In an attempt to stop any payment, Farrell attempts to kill Joan and Toni by filling their travelling camper with cooking gas. Rogers arrives just in time to stop the death, and they arrest Farrell.

Howley bails Farrell out of jail by telling Rogers and Bullfincher that he is really Jim Andrews, and was secretly checking in on his daughter. This is a lie constructed with the documentation from the real Andrews. Rogers and Joan ride out to the mine shaft and discover clues to show that Jim Andrews really is dead.

Farrell and Howley take Joan captive the next time she comes to ask for her money. They then conspire to rob Rogers' cattle shipment a second time, and use Joan as bait by feeding her false information. Howley is killed by Farrell in this plot to both allow Farrell to take a full cut, and to convince Joan that Rogers has been killed. Secretly, Rogers has really stowed away with his own cattle shipment as a safeguard.

Rogers' posse show up at the wrong location based on the false information Joan unknowingly gives them. However, Roy fights off the attackers long enough for Bullfincher and the others to arrive. Rogers gives chase to Farrell who goes careening off a cliff and dies.

== Cast ==
- Roy Rogers as Roy Rogers
- Trigger as Trigger, Roy's Horse
- Adele Mara as Joan Andrews
- Andy Devine as Cookie Bullfincher
- Grant Withers as Ran Farrell
- Marie Harmon as Toni Borden
- Joseph Crehan as Engineer Casey
- George M. Carleton as Attorney Jason Howley
- Holly Bane as Henchman Mort
- Steve Darrell as Tramp
- James Nolan as Jim Andrews
- Hank Patterson as Tramp
- Bob Nolan as Musician / Cowhand
- Sons of the Pioneers as Musicians / Cowhands

== Soundtrack ==
- Sons of the Pioneers - "Over Nevada" (Written by Tim Spencer)
- Roy Rogers - "The Big Rock Candy Mountain" (Written by Harry McClintock)
- Roy Rogers and the Sons of the Pioneers - "Night-Time In Nevada" (Written by Will E. Dulmage, Clint H. O'Reilly and Richard W. Pascoe)
- Sons of the Pioneers - "Sweet Laredo Lou" (Music by Bob Nolan, lyrics by Ed Morrisey)

== Preservation Status ==
=== Home Media ===
On August 25, 2009, Alpha Video released Night Time in Nevada on Region 0 DVD.

=== Restoration ===
A black-and-white/Trucolor hybrid restoration from Paramount Pictures was screened at the 2nd Annual Cinecon pop-up in El Segundo in March 2026.
