= Say, You Haven't Sacrificed at All! (March) =

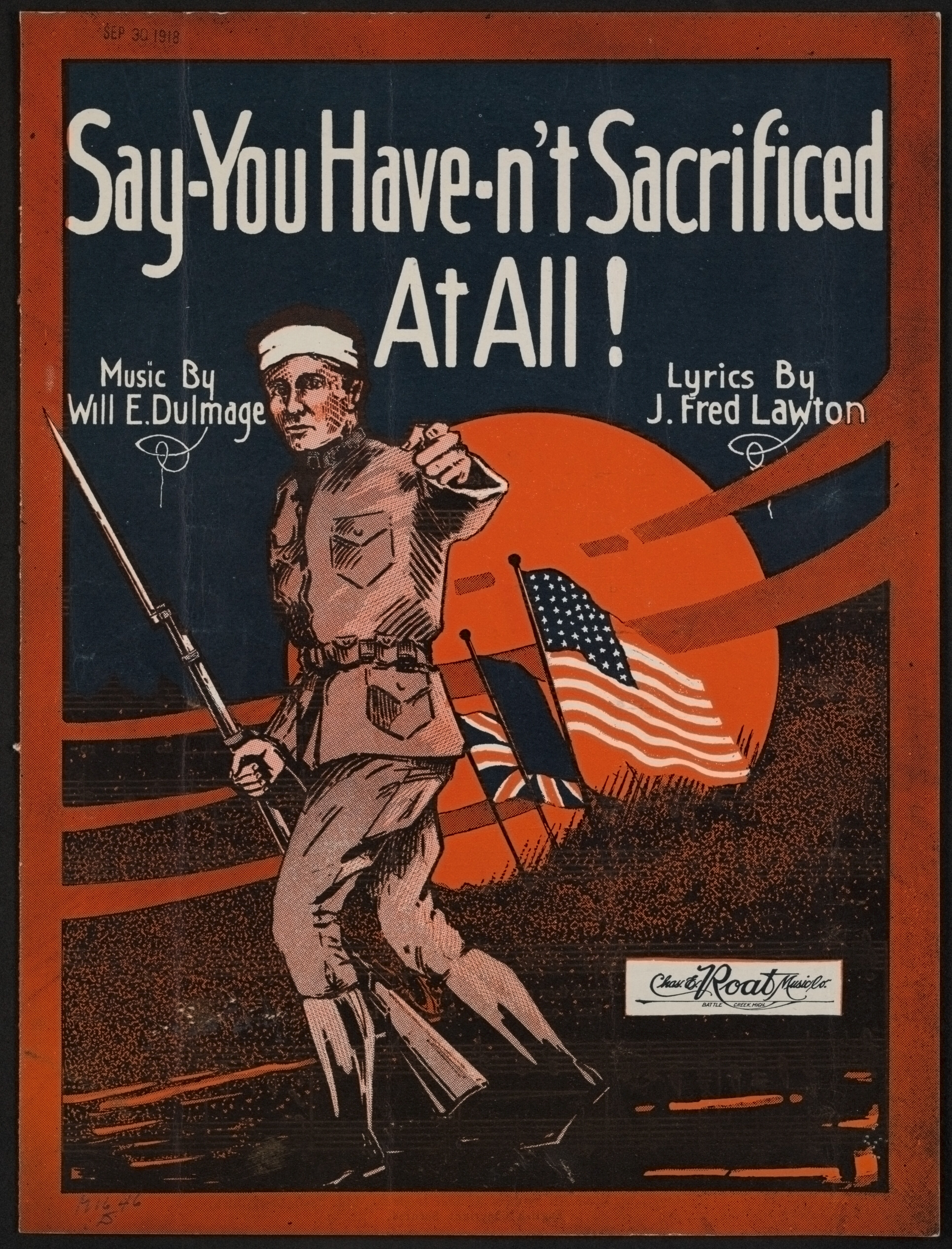

Song
- Released: 1918
- Label: Chas E. Roat Music, Co.
- Composer: Will E. Dulmage
- Lyricist: J. Fred Lawton

"Say, You Haven't Sacrificed at All! (March)", also written as "Say-You Haven't Sacrificed at All!" or "Say-You Have-n't Sacrificed at All!", is a World War I era song released in 1918. Most sources have attributed the role of composer to Will E. Dulmage and lyricist to J. Fred Lawton, as it is credited on the sheet music cover. One source has their roles reversed, and another source claims both composed the music. The song was published by Chas E. Roat Music Co. of Battle Creek, Michigan. On the cover is a soldier with a head wound, pointing. Behind him are British, French, and American flags. It was written for both voice and piano.

The song's lyrics conveys the message to listeners that they haven't done enough on their part to help the war effort. Only those who have actually fought in battle can say they have sacrificed for America. For those who are unable to fight, they are told they must give as much time and money as they can, because "to loaf on Uncle Sammy is a crime." The chorus is as follows:

Have you had a gun up on your good right shoulder?
Have you ever slept out in the mud?
Have you performed your duties
among the rats and cooties?
Have you ever shed a drop of blood for Uncle Sammy?
Have you ever charged out there on No Man's Land?
Have you ever heard your captain call
Over the Top Till
you know how bullets sing
how they ring
how they sting
Say you haven't sacrificed at all

The sheet music can be found at the Library of Congress and Pritzker Military Museum & Library.
