= Spring Gulch =

Ski area in Colorado, United States

Coordinates: 39°21′17″N 107°17′58″W

Spring Gulch is a cross-country ski area that is located on Thompson Creek Road in northwestern Pitkin County, Colorado, six miles west of Carbondale, Colorado, United States. The ski area shares its name with a historical 19th and early 20th century coal mining townsite, Spring Gulch, which is in the vicinity mostly to the south of the ski area proper. The area is run by the non-profit Mount Sopris Nordic Council for the benefit of community members and visitors. Use of the area is free of cost and limited to cross-country skiing activities.

The terrain consists primarily of rolling trails among gambel oak and aspen trees. Views of the nearby Mount Sopris and Elk Mountains are visible from some of the higher trails. The area was formed in cooperation with the local North Thompson Cattlemen's Association, which owns the land and uses it for summer grazing, during which time it is closed to all recreational use. Notable annual events include the Ski for Sisu fundraiser, the Alpine Bank Classic high school Junior Olympic qualifiers, and the Colorado Rocky Mountain School Rat Race.

Spring Gulch is the primary training ground for the Nordic team at CRMS.
