= Michigan Marching Band =

Student band at the University of Michigan

- School: University of Michigan
- Location: Ann Arbor, Michigan, U.S.
- Conference: Big Ten
- Founded: 1896; 130 years ago
- Director: John Pasquale
- Associate Director: Richard Frey
- Members: 400
- Practice field: Elbel Field
- Fight song: "The Victors"

Uniform
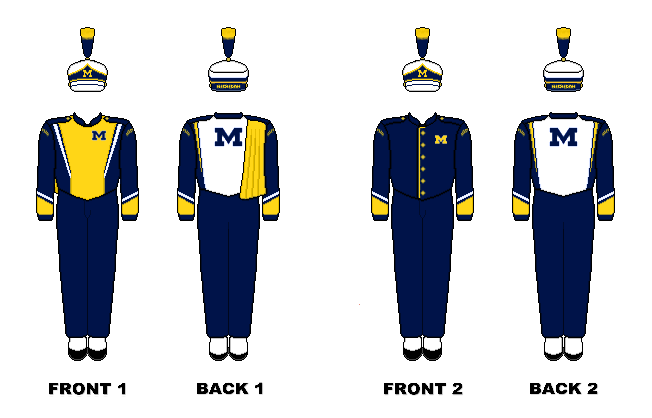
- Website: https://michiganmarchingband.com/

The Michigan Marching Band (also known as the University of Michigan Marching Band or the MMB) is the official marching band of the University of Michigan. The band performs at all Michigan Wolverines football home games, select away games, and numerous concerts, pep rallies, and parades. A student musical ensemble, the MMB evolved from the original Michigan Band of twenty-two players in 1896 to today's band of over 400 members.

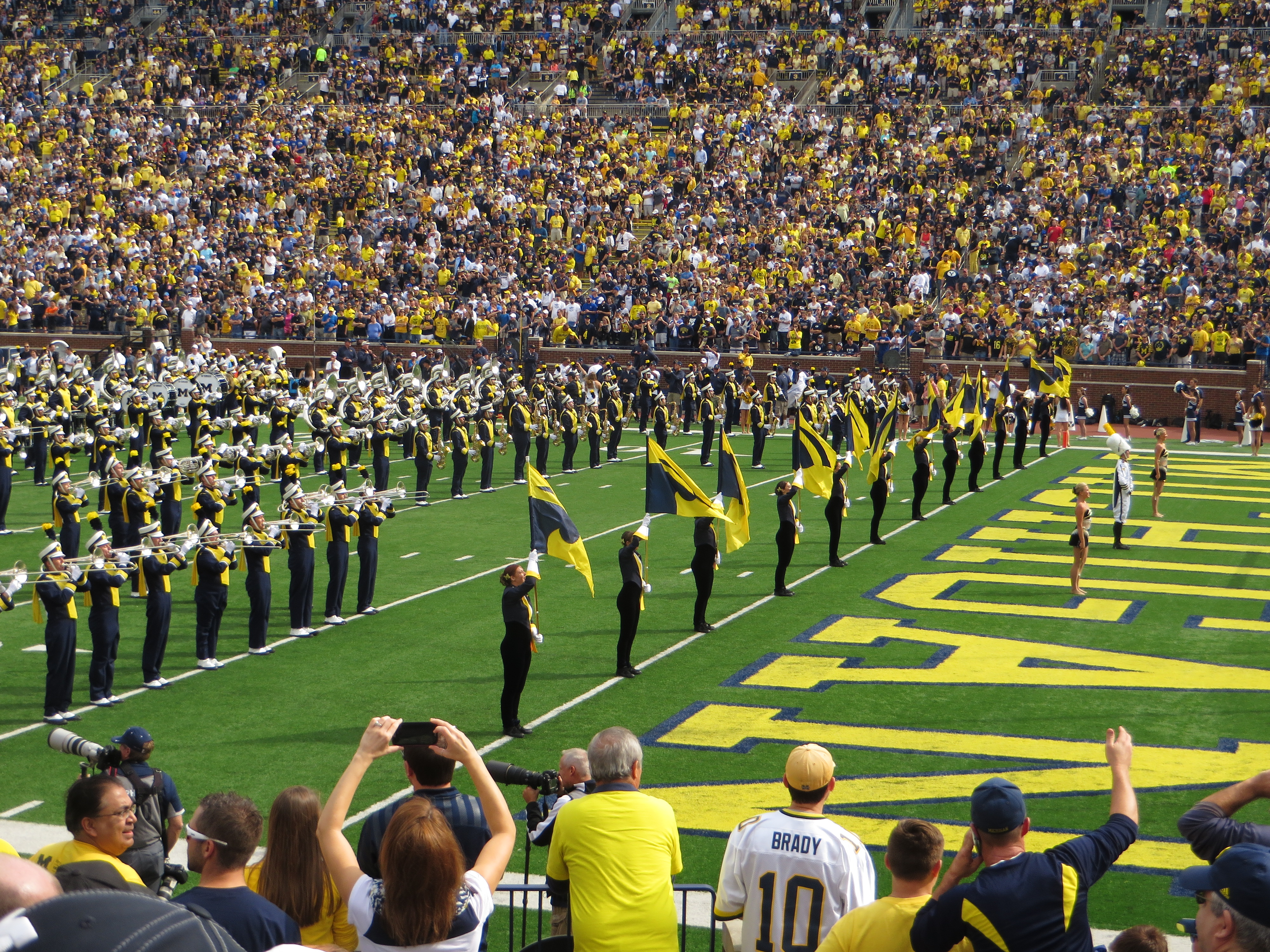
Michigan Marching Band on September 26, 2015

== History ==
=== Pre-1900 ===
Though there is evidence of one or more bands formed at the University of Michigan between 1844 and 1859, there is no continuous link between those early groups and the organization of a 22-member university band by Harry dePont on November 13, 1896. At the start, the dePont-organized band received no financial support from the university. The band's first public performance was for the Law School's observance of Washington's Birthday on February 22, 1897. University president James Burrill Angell granted dePont's request for rehearsal space in Room A of University Hall, and by 1898 the band was being referred to as the "University of Michigan Band" and performed at football games.

=== 1900–1929 ===
The ensemble disbanded in early 1903, but reunited that fall. Eugene J. Fischer became the band's conductor with the start of the 1906 season. During Wilfred Wilson's subsequent tenure as director, membership in the band grew to nearly 100 musicians and the university allocated permanent space for the band's use in Morris Hall. Nicholas Falcone was appointed as conductor in 1927. The band became an adjunct part of the university in 1929.

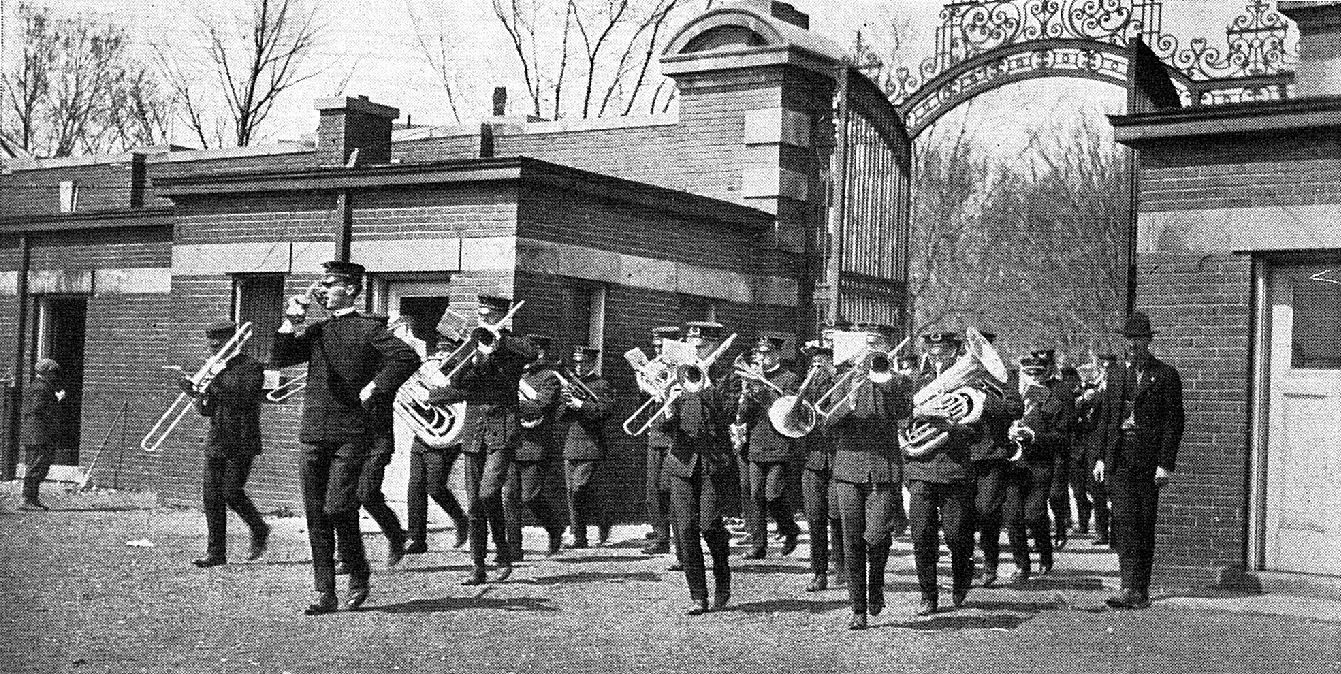
The 1920 Michigan Marching Band from the Michiganensian yearbook 1921

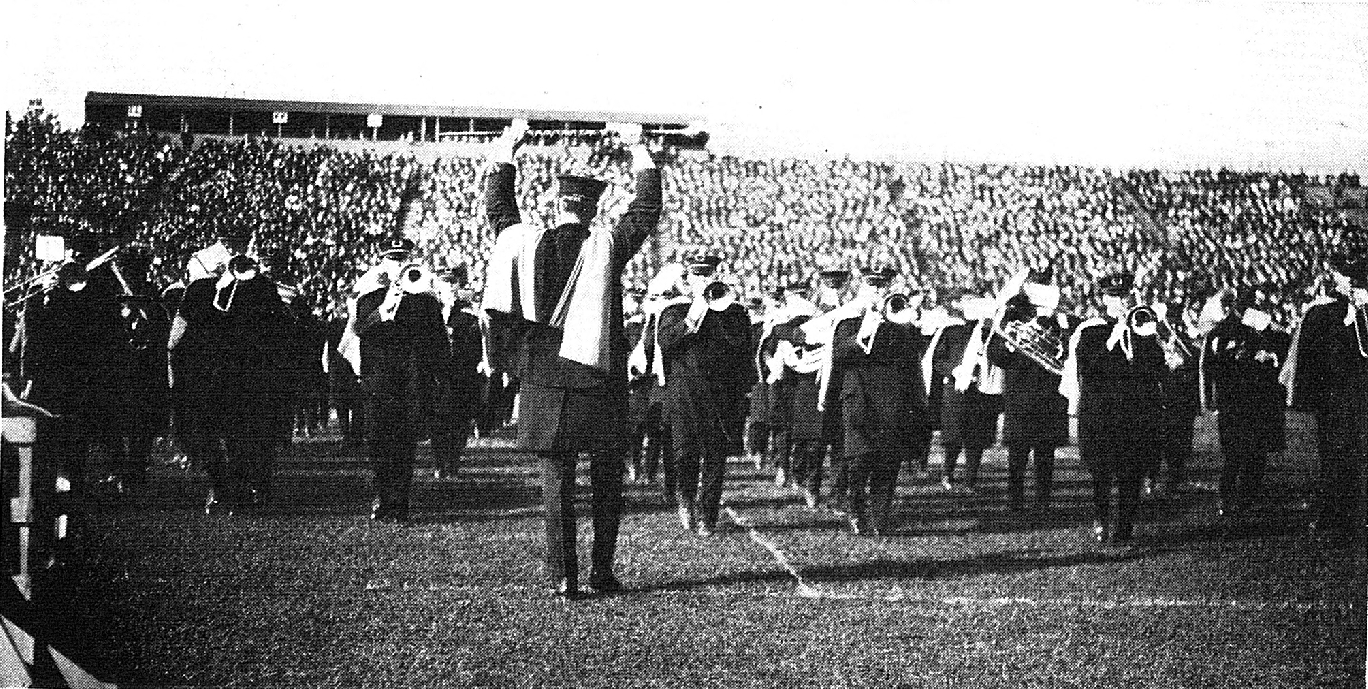
Michigan Marching Band performs Yellow and Blue at halftime of the Chicago game, 1920.

=== 1930–1949 ===
During the Michigan–Ohio State football game in 1932, the MMB first performed a "script Ohio" formation. That field formation was subsequently embellished by the Ohio State University Marching Band, which continues to perform a similar field routine today. The band performed at the Century of Progress exhibition in Chicago in October 1933.

On August 26, 1935, while Bernard Hirsch was serving as Acting Conductor during Nicholas Falcone's medical leave due to hearing loss, the university offered Falcone's position to William D. Revelli, who accepted. By 1942, the band had been "voted 'All-American Band' by the nation's sportswriters" for two consecutive years. The band was able to continue performing during the years of World War II. The band's home was relocated to Harris Hall in 1946.

=== 1950–1969 ===
Life featured the band's New York City performance in its October 30, 1950, edition that included an Alfred Eisenstadt photograph of children marching behind drum major Dick Smith. During Homecoming Weekend in November 1950, sixty-five former Michigan bandsmen attended a reunion which resulted in the formation of the University of Michigan Band Alumni Association. In 1953, the Alumni Band began to join the regular band playing and marching at the Homecoming pre-game and halftime shows. George R. Cavender was appointed as Assistant Director of Bands for the University of Michigan in 1952. The band was featured on a color broadcast of the "Today Show" with host Dave Garroway in October 1955. The MMB performed in the so-called "Snow Bowl" game against Ohio State in late November, and later traveled by train to perform in the 1951 Rose Bowl.

Starting in 1961, the Symphony Band recorded several music albums released by Vanguard Records that were credited to "University of Michigan Band". These albums documented the continued, functional specialization of the various ensembles comprising the Michigan Bands at that time. The Varsity Band played at basketball games and campus affairs. The Symphony Band performed in more traditional concert settings. The Marching Band performed at football games. The band received new uniforms, percussion equipment, and fiberglass sousaphones in 1962. The annual Band-O-Rama concert was first held in November 1964. The band performed its "Peace Show" at the nationally televised Michigan-Ohio State football game in 1969. The MMB also performed at the 1970 Rose Bowl following the 1969 season.

=== 1970–1989 ===
In 1970, Carl Grapentine was appointed the band announcer, becoming the "Voice of the Michigan Bands" (and, since 2006, the "Voice of Michigan Stadium"). The performance block had grown to 210 members. Dr. Revelli retired from the band in the summer of 1971 and was succeeded by Cavender. Women were allowed to join the marching band starting in 1972. The MMB performed as part of the halftime show at 1973's Super Bowl VII, collaborating with Woody Herman and Andy Williams. A new facility, named Revelli Hall, was built to house the marching band. The MMB's practice field formally known as Wines Field was renamed Elbel Field. Cavender retired in 1979 and was succeeded by Glenn Richter. The MMB performed at the 1972, 1977, 1978, and 1979 Rose Bowl games, as well as at the 1976 Orange Bowl game. The 1978 Rose Bowl performance featured the first public performance of the John Williams' musical score to the movie, Close Encounters of the Third Kind.

Eric Becher succeeded Richter as the MMB's conductor in 1980. The band appeared on the television special, A Bob Hope Celebration on October 22, 1981. In 1982, the MMB performed in Super Bowl XVI and was selected as the inaugural winner of the Sudler Trophy. The MMB also performed at the final game of the 1984 World Series in Tiger Stadium and survived a mob attack in the riot that followed. In 1989, Jerry Luckhardt became the MMB's conductor. The MMB performed at the 1981, 1983, 1987, and 1989 Rose Bowl games.

=== 1990–2019 ===
Dr. Gary Lewis became Director of the MMB in 1990. On November 20, 1992, the MMB appeared as musical guests on the ABC television variety show, Live with Regis and Kathie Lee. Jeff Grogan directed the band for the 1995 season. Dr. Kevin Sedatole was appointed as Director of the MMB in 1996, with Grogan remaining as Assistant Director. Dr. James Tapia was appointed as Director of the MMB in 1999. The band performed at the 1990 Rose Bowl.

In 2001, Jamie L. Nix was hired as the 13th Director of the MMB. That same year, the MMB elected Karen England as its first female Drum Major. On January 2, 2007, having performed at the Rose Bowl the previous day, the Michigan Marching Band attended the arrival of President Gerald Ford's body in Grand Rapids, Michigan. The MMB honored President Ford's funeral procession with somber performances of "Ruffles and Flourishes", "Hail to the Chief", "The Yellow and Blue", and "The Victors". Dr. Scott Boerma succeeded Nix as director of the band that same year.

In 2013, Dr. John Pasquale became Director of the MMB. He replaced Dr. Scott Boerma, who announced his resignation as director following the 2013 Outback Bowl to take the position of Director of Bands at his alma mater, Western Michigan University. Dr. Andrea Brown was hired as the band's Associate Director, becoming the first female Associate Director at the University of Michigan. In 2015, the band collaborated with conductor Alan Gilbert and the brass section of the New York Philharmonic for a halftime performance consisting of 1,000 performers. In 2018, Dr. Richard Frey was hired as the band's Associate Director.

=== 2020–present ===
The Michigan Marching Band announced an entirely virtual season for the 2020–2021 academic year in response to the coronavirus pandemic.

On September 11, 2021, for the 20th anniversary of the September 11 terrorist attacks on the United States, the Michigan Marching Band performed a tribute show entitled "We Remember", in conjunction with Durant Design. The show featured selections from John Williams' Summon the Heroes; West Side Story's Mambo; Billy Joel's New York State of Mind; Jay-Z and Alicia Keys' Empire State of Mind; Hamilton's Who Lives, Who Dies, Who Tells Your Story; Woody Guthrie's This Land is Your Land; and John Philip Sousa's Stars & Stripes Forever.

On September 26, 2026, the band performed with renowned cellist Yo-Yo Ma to perform music from The Lord of the Rings film soundtrack.

=== Past directors and drum majors ===
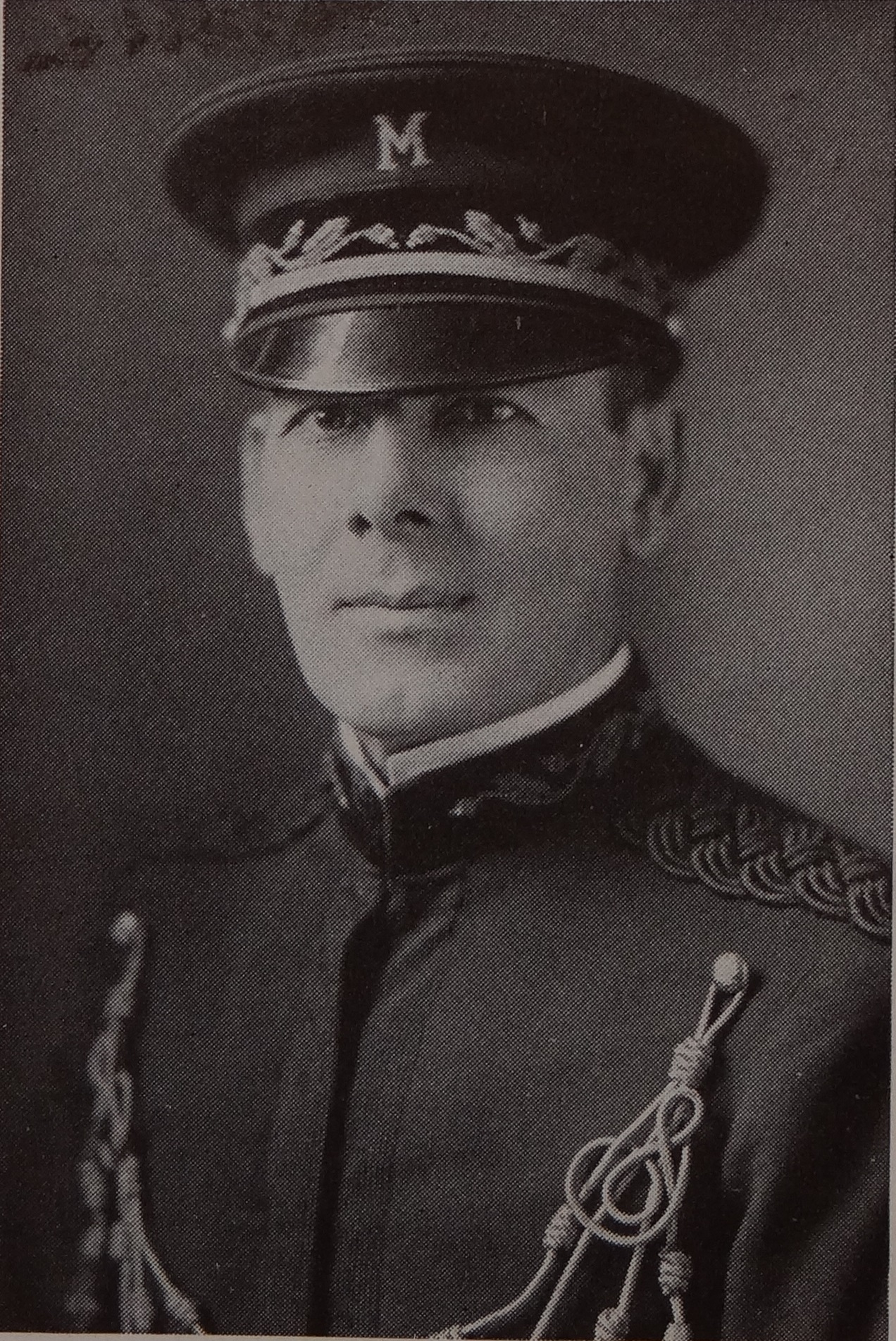
Capt. Wilfred W. Wilson, director 1915–1926

Year	Past directors:	Year	Past drum majors:
1896	Roy P. Warren		
1897	Lewellyn L. Renwick	1897	Fredrick Lawrence Travers
1900	Allen Lynn Darr	1898–1912	
1903–04	William Hoffman	1898–1912	
1906–14	Eugene "Ike" Fisher	1898–1912	
1906–14	Eugene "Ike" Fisher	1913–14	George Olsen
1914–15	Herbert E. Richards	1914–15	
1915–26	Captain Wilfred Wilson	1916–20	Eugene A. Osius
1915–26	Captain Wilfred Wilson	1921–22	John P. Lawton
1915–26	Captain Wilfred Wilson	1923–25	Paul R. Sellards
1915–26	Captain Wilfred Wilson	1924	Robert V. Halsey
1915–26	Captain Wilfred Wilson	1925–27	Gordon Packer
1926–27	Norman J. Larson	1925–27	Gordon Packer
1927–36	Nicholas Falcone	1925–27	Gordon Packer
1927–36	Nicholas Falcone	1928	Joe Narrin, Roger Kenneth Becker
1927–36	Nicholas Falcone	1928–29	Joe Narrin
1927–36	Nicholas Falcone	1930–32	Frank O. Riley
1934–35	Bernard Hirsch ("Acting Conductor")	1930–32	Frank O. Riley
1934–35	Bernard Hirsch ("Acting Conductor")	1933–34	Donald A. Strouse
1935–71	William D. Revelli	1935–36	Robert W. Fox
1935–71	William D. Revelli	1936–37	Frederick N. Wiest
1935–71	William D. Revelli	1937–38	Robert W. Fox
1935–71	William D. Revelli	1939–40	Gilbert Stevenson, John "Jack" Sherrill
1935–71	William D. Revelli	1940–41	John "Jack" Sherrill
1935–71	William D. Revelli	1941–42	Lynn Stedman
1935–71	William D. Revelli	1942–43	Lynn Stedman, Pat McNaughton
1935–71	William D. Revelli	1943–44	Lynn Stedman
1935–71	William D. Revelli	1944–45	Douglas Clark
1935–71	William D. Revelli	1945–46	Douglas Clark, John Harold Packer
1935–71	William D. Revelli	1946–47	Lynn Stedman
1935–71	William D. Revelli	1947–48	Noah Knepper
1935–71	William D. Revelli	1948–49	Fred Briedenbach
1935–71	William D. Revelli	1950–52	Dick Smith
1935–71	William D. Revelli	1953–54	Floyd Zarbock
1935–71	William D. Revelli	1954–55	Vic Walton, Gurdon "Champ" Patton
1935–71	William D. Revelli	1955–57	Gurdon "Champ" Patton
1935–71	William D. Revelli	1958–59	Gary Kocher
1935–71	William D. Revelli	1960–64	Bill McCann
1935–71	William D. Revelli	1965–66	Dave Smith, Lynn Cooper
1935–71	William D. Revelli	1966–67	Dave Smith, Dick Follett
1935–71	William D. Revelli	1967–68	Dick Follett
1935–71	William D. Revelli	1969–70	Dave Smith, Mark Brown
1935–71	William D. Revelli	1970–71	Mark Brown
1971–79	George R. Cavender	1970–71	Mark Brown
1971–79	George R. Cavender	1972–74	Albert Ahronheim
1971–79	George R. Cavender	1975–77	Jeff Wilkins
1971–79	George R. Cavender	1978–80	Guy Bordo
1979–80	Glenn Richter	1978–80	Guy Bordo
1980–1989	Eric A. Becher	1978–80	Guy Bordo
1980–1989	Eric A. Becher	1981–83	Steve Roberts
1980–1989	Eric A. Becher	1984–85	Andy Purvis
1980–1989	Eric A. Becher	1986–87	Kevin Ross
1980–1989	Eric A. Becher	1987–88	Andy Purvis
1980–1989	Eric A. Becher	1988–89	Jeff Stokes
1989–90	Jerry Luckhardt	1989–90	Jeff Stokes
1990–95	Gary J. Lewis	1990–91	Rodney Weir
1990–95	Gary J. Lewis	1992–93	Greg Macklem
1990–95	Gary J. Lewis	1993–95	Matthew Pickus
1995–96	Jeff Grogan	1995–96	Jason Wuellner
1996–99	Kevin L. Sedatole	1996–98	Ramon Johnson
1999–2001	James R. Tapia	1999–2000	Gregg Whitmore
1999–2001	James R. Tapia	2001–02	Karen England
2001–06	Jamie L. Nix	2001–02	Karen England
2001–06	Jamie L. Nix	2002–03	Matt Cavanaugh
2001–06	Jamie L. Nix	2004–05	Dennis Lee
2001–06	Jamie L. Nix	2006–07	Iden Baghdadchi
2007–12	Scott Boerma	2007–08	Cody Martin
2007–12	Scott Boerma	2009–10	David Hines, Jr.
2007–12	Scott Boerma	2011–12	Jeffrey McMahon
2013-	John Pasquale	2013–14	Jeff Okala
2013-	John Pasquale	2015–16	Matthew Cloutier
2013-	John Pasquale	2016–17	McKenna Thayer
2013-	John Pasquale	2017–18	Kevin Zhang
2013-	John Pasquale	2018–20	Kelly Bertoni
2013-	John Pasquale	2020–22	Walter Aguilar
2013-	John Pasquale	2022–23	Rachel Zhang
2013-	John Pasquale	2023–24	Blake Brdak
2013-	John Pasquale	2024–25	Christian Nunez
2013-	John Pasquale	2025-26	Miguel Retto
2013-	John Pasquale	2026-	Ella Blank

== Discography ==
=== Albums ===
- HAIL (2024)
- Forever Valiant (2017)
- This is Michigan (2012)
- 2008 Season Highlights (2009)
- Gameday Faves: Michigan Wolverines Classics (2009)
- The Maize Album (2009)
- The Blue Album (2008)
- 2005 Season Highlights (2005)
- The Victors Valiant (2003)
- 2002 Season Highlights (2002)
- It's All About Blue (2000)
- Hurrah for the Yellow and Blue (1998)
- A Saturday Tradition (1993)
- Fire Up... It's Saturday (1985)
- 1983 Rose Bowl Highlights (1983)
- Halftime Classics (1978)
- "Revelli's Michigan Stadium Echoes" 1935–1971 (Unknown date after 1970)
- MICHIGAN (1972)
- The Yellow And Blue / The Victors-March (1926)

=== Other album appearances ===
- Various Artists: Gameday Faves: Classic College Fight Songs (Volume 2): "The Victors - Michigan Wolverines (Live)" (2008)
- Destiny's Child: Destiny Fulfilled: "Lose My Breath", drum cadence sample (2004)

== Filmography ==
=== Documentaries ===
- Take The Field (2019)
- The Band Director (1973)
- Marching For Roses (1971)
- Pow Pow (1960)
- Here Comes the Band (1951)

=== Soundtrack contributions ===
- Love, Simon: "Bad Romance", "What Is Love" (2018)
- Deliver Us from Eva: "The Victors" (2003)
- Bicentennial Man: "The Washington Post" (1999)
- The Waterboy: "Entry Cadence", "Temptation", "Hawaiian War Chant" (1998)
- The Sixth Man: "Let's Go Blue" (1997)
