= Harris Hall =

- U.S. National Register of Historic Places
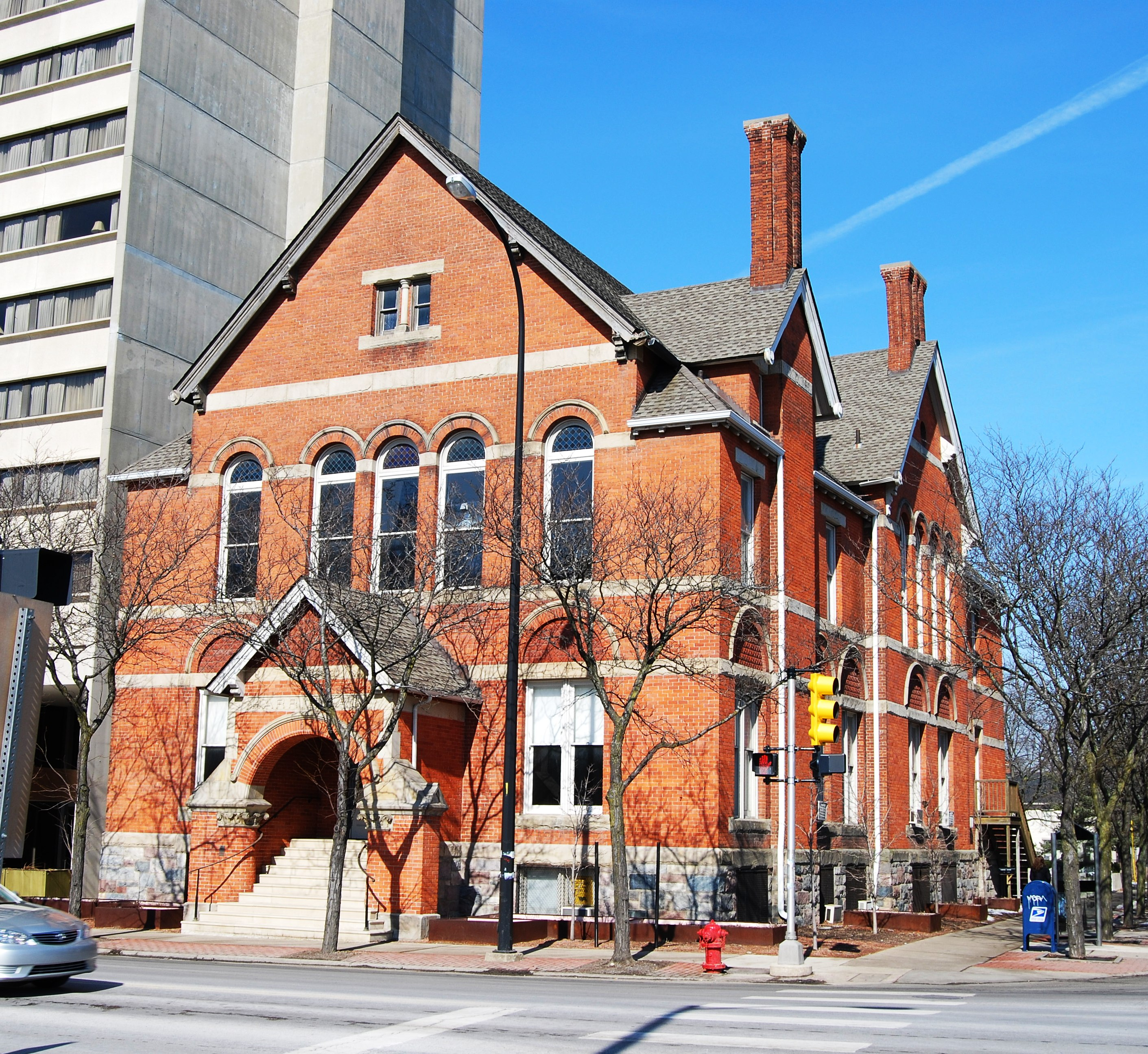
- Interactive map
- Location: 617 East Huron St., Ann Arbor, Michigan
- Coordinates: 42°16′53″N 83°44′28″W
- Area: less than one acre
- Built: 1886
- Architect: Gordon W. Lloyd
- Architectural style: Late Victorian
- NRHP reference No.: 82002885

Significant dates
- Dedicated: April 19, 1887; 139 years ago
- Added to NRHP: April 22, 1982

Harris Hall is a former auditorium and office building located at 617 East Huron Street in Ann Arbor, Michigan. It was listed on the National Register of Historic Places in 1982.

Harris Hall was built in the 1880s as an auditorium and student activities center affiliated with the St. Andrew's Episcopal Church, located blocks away. The building has served as a USO, offices, and a meeting space for the Christian organization Word of God. The University of Michigan purchased the building in 2025.

== History ==
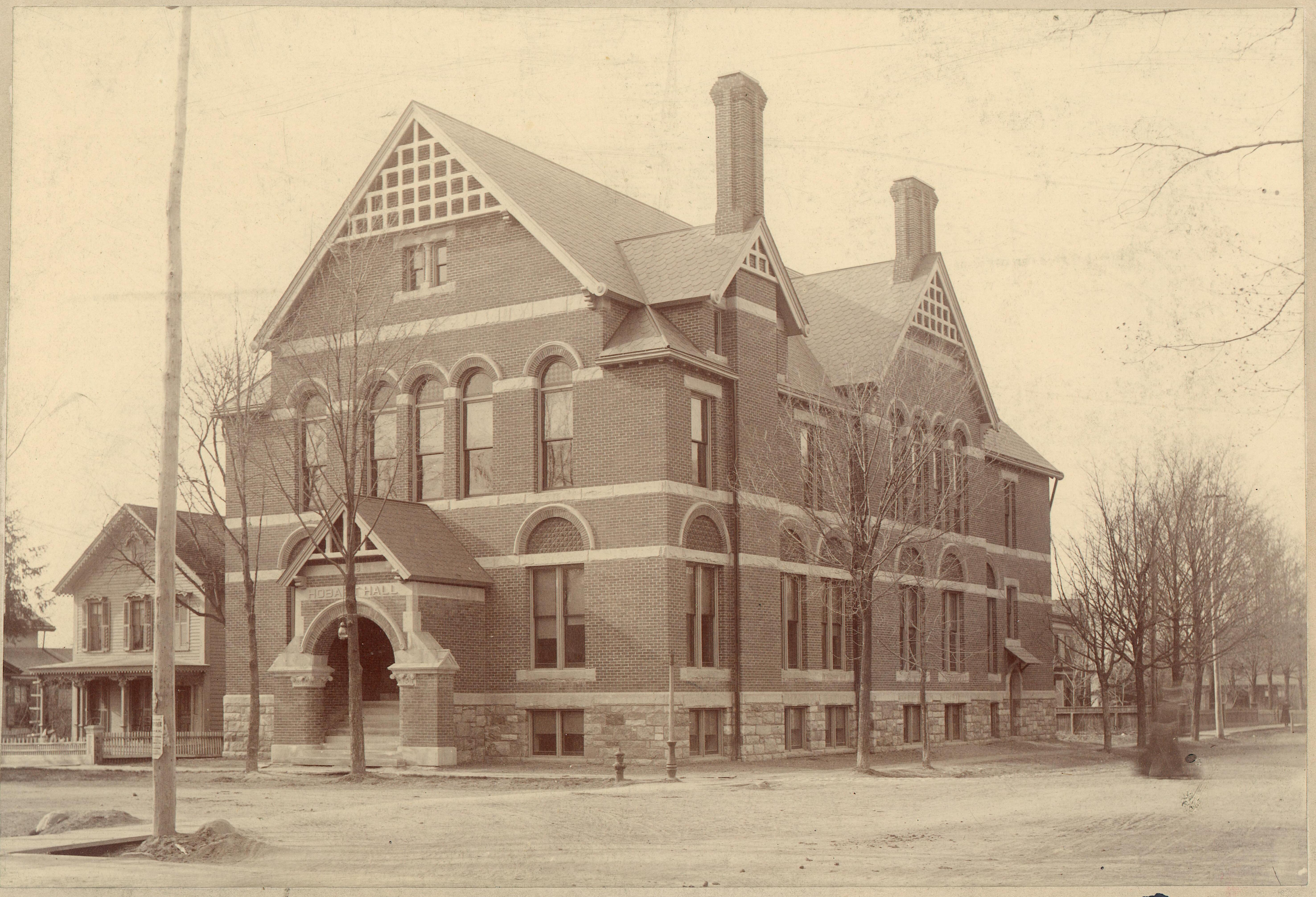
Harris Hall shortly after its construction, with its original name of Hobart Hall above the door

The Reverend Samuel Smith Harris was the second Bishop of the Episcopal Diocese of Michigan. During the late 1800s, in response to the controversy surrounding the then-new theory of evolution, Harris had the idea of constructing a forum for discussions of religion and science. Ann Arbor, the location of the University of Michigan, was Harris's selection for a location. In 1883, Harris and the local parish, St. Andrew's, began raising funds to construct a building. The church hired Detroit architect Gordon W. Lloyd to design this auditorium. Construction began in 1886 and was complete in 1887. The building was dedicated on April 19, 1887 in a ceremony attended by Harris, former Michigan Governor Henry P. Baldwin, and prominent university professor Henry Simmons Frieze

The building was originally named Hobart Hall in honor of former bishop John Henry Hobart, but was renamed after Harris's unexpected death in 1888. The hall was used for lectures, concerts, and other cultural forms of entertainment. The hall served the Episcopal church (it included parish house facilities) and university students, as well as the community at large. In addition to the auditorium, the building also contained a gymnasium, bowling alley, and billiard room.

The building continued to be used for its original purpose until 1943, when it was converted to a USO for servicemen undergoing military training at the university. Beginning in 1946, the university leased it to use as headquarters for the Band and Wind Instrument departments. In 1974, St. Andrew's sold the structure to the non-denominational Word of God Community. In 1980, the firm of Buckheim and Rowland acquired the building and converted it to use as offices.

== Description ==
Harris Hall is 2 1/2-story, red brick gable-roofed structure, measuring 50 by 80 feet (15 m × 24 m). It sits on a random-ashlar foundation, and has yellow-gray stone trim as string courses, doorway and window sills and lintels, and drip moldings. It has wooden Queen Anne-style eavesboards with supporting brackets. Above the entry and first floor windows are recessed, arch-topped, spandrel panels containing red terra cotta. Similar panels in the second story contain colored glass transom lights. A flight of limestone steps runs up to the main entrance, which is protected by a projecting, gable-roofed structure with rounded flanking walls and carved stone capitals similar to Romanesque columns.
