= The Victors =

Fight song of the University of Michigan

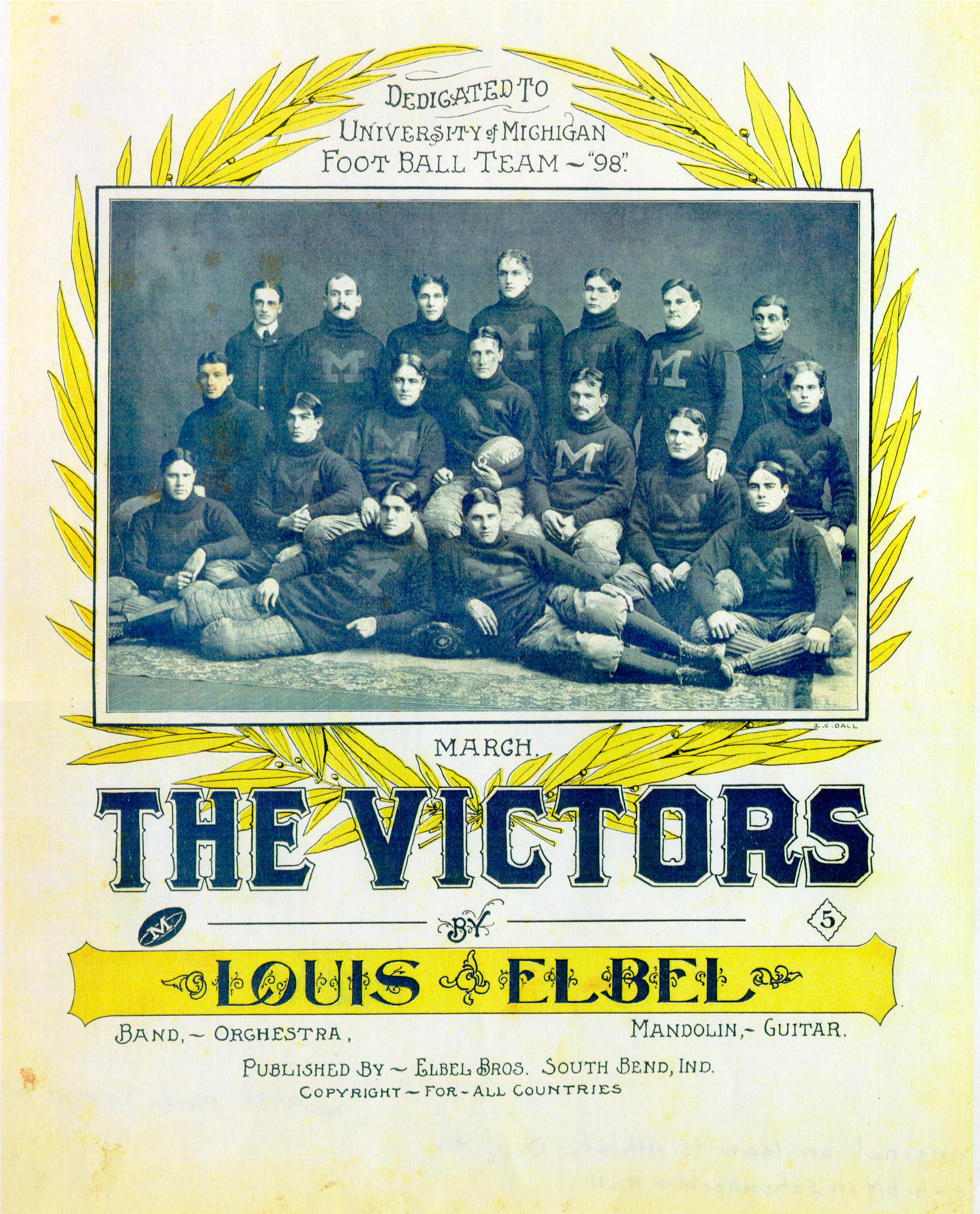
- Sheet music cover
- Fight song of the University of Michigan
- Lyrics: Louis Elbel, 1898
- Music: Louis Elbel, 1898

Audio sample
- file; help

"The Victors" is the fight song of the University of Michigan. Michigan student Louis Elbel wrote the song in 1898 after the football team's victory over the University of Chicago, which clinched an undefeated season and the Western Conference championship.

An abbreviated version of the song, based on its final refrain, is played at University of Michigan sporting events and functions. "The Victors" is considered one of the greatest college fight songs ever written.

== History ==
"The Victors" was written by University of Michigan student Louis Elbel in 1898 following the 12–11 football victory over the University of Chicago that clinched the Western Conference championship on Thanksgiving at Chicago's Stagg Field. Singing "There'll Be a Hot Time in the Old Town Tonight" after the game—then considered school's unofficial fight song—Elbel felt the event should be "dignified by something more elevating for this was no ordinary victory." With that in mind, Elbel wrote "The Victors" in the style of a military march on the train ride back to Ann Arbor.

Elbel and a student orchestra made the first public performance of "The Victors" on April 5, 1899, during A Night Off, an on-campus undergraduate musical. It was received well, with the audience requesting an encore. Three days later in Ann Arbor, the song was performed during a concert by United States Marine Band leader and "March King" John Philip Sousa. Sousa held the song in high regard: "No one but a master of counterpoint could have conceived the splendid harmony that marks the composition throughout," the bandleader said.

After Michigan temporarily withdrew from the Western Conference in 1907, a new Michigan fight song, "Varsity," was written in 1911 because the line "champions of the West" was no longer applicable. Both songs were popular, but with Michigan's reentry to the Western Conference in 1917, followed by an undefeated football season in 1918, "The Victors" was readopted permanently.

During World War I, both German and French military bands played the song. The U.S. 125th Infantry Band played the song in 1918 as Michigan soldiers entered defeated Germany. In the 1920s, an alternate set of lyrics were penned by an unknown author.

Elbel returned for Michigan's homecoming yearly to lead the band in playing "The Victors" until his death in 1959. In 1961, the Michigan Band went on a world tour in 31 countries with "The Victors" as a selection played.

== Authorship ==
Elbel copyrighted "The Victors" in early 1899. In 1983, Michigan marching band alumnus George Anderson found that the song's trio bore a strong resemblance to George Rosenberg's "The Spirit of Liberty March," which was copyrighted in 1898. Jim Henriksen, another band alumnus, wrote "The Authorship of 'The Victors March'" paper covering the various theories about the similarities indicating that none would be proved to be true. Former U-M Band Alumni president Joseph Dobos considered Elbel the only author, which received support from Bill Studwell, author of College Fight Songs: An Annotated Anthology, as many composers borrowed from each other. Dobos also wrote the "Did Louis Elbel Write 'The Victors'?" essay for the band alumni publication M-Fanfare fall 2007 issue indicating that Victors was more "tightly composed" than "Spirit" and was a "circus" march while "Spirit" was a "two-step."

== Uses and performances ==
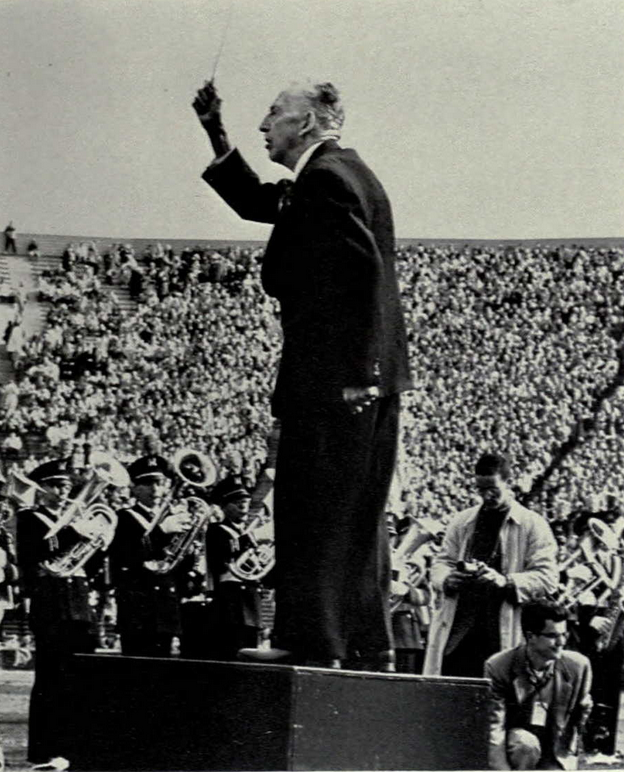
Louis Elbel conducting the Michigan Marching Band in "The Victors," 1958

Various versions of the song are used at U-M functions, including three versions the marching band often plays at football games, a calypso version named "Calyptors," a Dixieland version titled the "Hoover Street Rag," named after the band's home, Revelli Hall on E. Hoover Ave., and "El Victors Caliente," a Latin arrangement by previous director Scott Boerma. Additional arrangements in blues and waltz styles have also historically been played.

The chorus of the song ("Hail! to the victors valiant," etc.) is played at all University of Michigan sports competitions, as well as many U-M band events, first-year student orientation and welcoming events, and graduation commencement ceremonies. Many attendees will stand when it is played, sing along and clap in rhythm until the chorus when, at each repetition of the word "Hail!," they thrust their fists in the air. This fist-raising has become well-accepted as an indication of school spirit. Since the late 1990s, attendees at sports events have started to yell the phrase "Go Blue!" at the conclusion of the chorus. Attendees at hockey games have commonly inserted "Let's Go Blue!" between the two stanzas of the chorus after "leaders and best" and then conclude with "Go Blue!" When hockey games started play at Yost Ice Arena attendees have begun adopting the abbreviated football game version but continue to include "Let's Go Blue!" and conclude with "Go Blue!"

The popularity of U-M athletics and "The Victors" has prompted the song being used by the University of Michigan in its advertising. Commercials for the University of Michigan Health System's "The Michigan Difference" campaign have featured the words to the chorus of "The Victors" over pictures of children in hospital beds, amputees and post-surgical patients living active lives, and doctors performing surgery. The musical accompaniment to these commercials is a light chamber orchestra/pop rendition of the fight song. The University started using a softer version in its TV commercials for U-M Health System starting in 2008.

The University of Michigan's Flint campus selected "The Victors" as their sports nickname in an unofficial student vote in 2008.

Michigan alumnus Gerald R. Ford, the 38th President of the United States, often had the White House band play the fight song prior to state events instead of "Hail to the Chief." He also selected the song to be played during his December 2006 funeral procession at the U.S. Capitol. The Michigan Marching Band played this march for him one final time when his casket arrived at the Gerald R. Ford International Airport in Grand Rapids, Michigan.

== Legacy ==
The Bleacher Report named the song the number one college fight song in 2011. In 2014, the USA Today College Football Fan Index named "The Victors" the number one fight song, but it fell to third place in 2015. While in 2015, NFL.com named it number two on its top 15 of college fight songs.

Michigan alumnus and composer Charles D. Kountz gave an account that in 1905, John Philip Sousa told him that "The Victors" was "one of the nation's finest military marches and the best original college song" he had ever heard.
