= The Yellow and Blue =

College song of the University of Michigan

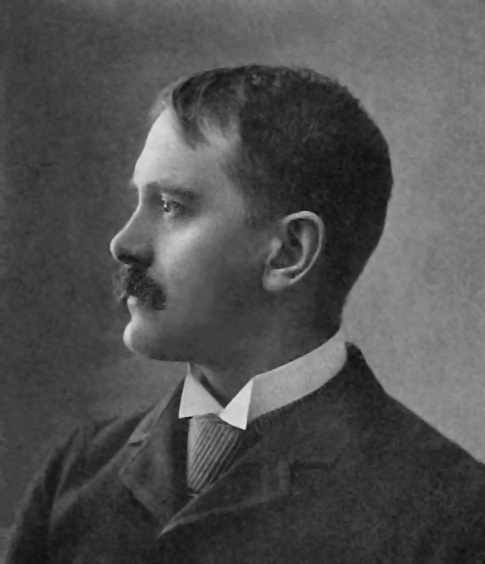
Charles Mills Gayley, librettist

The Yellow and Blue is the alma mater of the University of Michigan, written by Charles M. Gayley. An 1878 graduate, Gayley composed the lyrics in 1886 while he was a professor of English and Latin at UM. He was motivated to write the song in hopes of winning a $20 prize from the student editors of the yearbook (The Palladium). As he wrote the lyrics, Gayley was thinking of the school colors, "azure blue and maize." Ultimately, the song became a paean to the color and light of late summer in Michigan: the yellow grain in the fields, the yellow harvest moon, the varying blues of the sky at morning and sunset. These "ribbons that nature has spun" reminded him, too, of "the maid of the golden hair, and eyes that are brimming with blue."

Next Gayley chose a soft, wistful melody called "Pirates' Chorus" from The Enchantress, an opera by the Irish composer Michael William Balfe.

Students quickly embraced the song and began to sing it. Leaflets with the words were printed, and within a few years it was the university's recognized alma mater.

Gayley returned to Ann Arbor from time to time, and in 1925, near the end of a long life, he wrote: "It has always been a great joy to me, revisiting Ann Arbor, to hear the song still sung in fraternity houses, and on the campus in the twilight. I have heard it in mid-ocean, on the streets of Florence and Rome, and hither and yon as I have traveled about the world. A song written in the days of one's youth, if it by good luck expresses the emotion and enthusiasm of succeeding generations of young men and women, is a thousand times more worthwhile than many books of learning."
