= List of Michigan Wolverines football seasons =

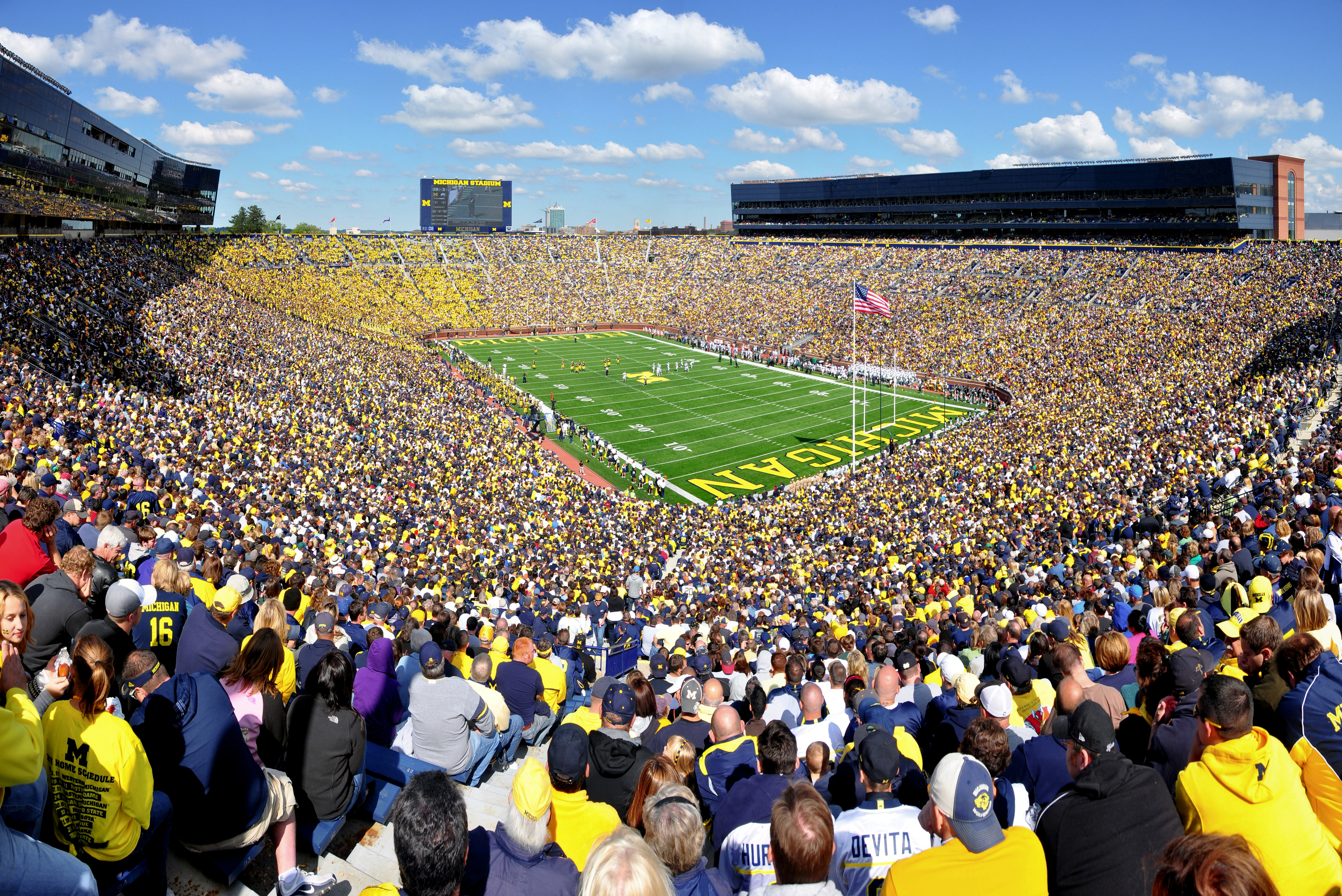
Michigan Stadium, where the Wolverines have played since 1927

This is a list of seasons completed by the Michigan Wolverines football team of the National Collegiate Athletic Association (NCAA) Division I Football Bowl Subdivision (FBS). Since the team's creation in 1879, the Wolverines have participated in more than 1,400 games, including 54 bowl games.

Michigan originally competed as an independent, before joining the Big Ten Conference (then known as the Western Conference) as one of the founding members in 1896. The Wolverines again competed as an independent between 1907 and 1916, before rejoining the Big Ten in 1917 and remaining a member since.

== Seasons ==
Year	Coach	Overall	Conference	Standing	Bowl/playoffs	Coaches^{#}	AP^{°}
Independent (1879–1890)
1879	No coach	1–0–1					
1880	No coach	1–0					
1881	No coach	0–3					
1882	No coach	0–0					
1883	No coach	2–3					
1884	No coach	2–0					
1885	No coach	3–0					
1886	No coach	2–0					
1887	No coach	5–0					
1888	No coach	2–1					
1889	No coach	1–2					
1890	No coach	4–1					
Mike Murphy & Frank Crawford (Independent) (1891)
1891	Murphy & Crawford	4–5					
Frank Barbour (IAANW) (1892–1893)
1892	Frank Barbour	7–5	1–2	3rd			
1893	Frank Barbour	7–3	1–2	3rd			
William McCauley (Independent) (1894–1895)
1894	William McCauley	9–1–1					
1895	William McCauley	8–1					
William Ward (Western Conference) (1896)
1896	William Ward	9–1	2–1	2nd			
Gustave Ferbert (Western Conference) (1897–1899)
1897	Gustave Ferbert	6–1–1	2–1	3rd			
1898	Gustave Ferbert	10–0	3–0	1st			
1899	Gustave Ferbert	8–2	1–1	T–3rd			
Langdon Lea (Western Conference) (1900)
1900	Langdon Lea	7–2–1	3–2	T–4th			
Fielding Yost (Western Conference) (1901–1906)
1901	Fielding Yost	11–0	4–0	T–1st	W Rose		
1902	Fielding Yost	11–0	5–0	1st			
1903	Fielding Yost	11–0–1	3–0–1	T–1st			
1904	Fielding Yost	10–0	2–0	T–1st			
1905	Fielding Yost	12–1	2–1	T–2nd			
1906	Fielding Yost	4–1	1–0	T–1st			
Fielding Yost (Independent) (1907–1916)
1907	Fielding Yost	5–1					
1908	Fielding Yost	5–2–1					
1909	Fielding Yost	6–1					
1910	Fielding Yost	3–0–3					
1911	Fielding Yost	5–1–2					
1912	Fielding Yost	5–2					
1913	Fielding Yost	6–1					
1914	Fielding Yost	6–3					
1915	Fielding Yost	4–3–1					
1916	Fielding Yost	7–2					
Fielding Yost (Western Conference) (1917–1923)
1917	Fielding Yost	8–2	0–1	T–8th			
1918	Fielding Yost	5–0	2–0	T–1st			
1919	Fielding Yost	3–4	1–4	T–7th			
1920	Fielding Yost	5–2	2–2	6th			
1921	Fielding Yost	5–1–1	2–1–1	5th			
1922	Fielding Yost	6–0–1	4–0	T–1st			
1923	Fielding Yost	8–0	4–0	T–1st			
George Little (Western Conference) (1924)
1924	George Little	6–2	4–2	4th			
Fielding Yost (Western Conference) (1925–1926)
1925	Fielding Yost	7–1	5–1	1st			
1926	Fielding Yost	7–1	5–0	T–1st			
Tad Wieman (Western Conference) (1927–1928)
1927	Tad Wieman	6–2	3–2	3rd			
1928	Tad Wieman	3–4–1	2–3	8th			
Harry Kipke (Western Conference) (1929–1937)
1929	Harry Kipke	5–3–1	1–3–1	7th			
1930	Harry Kipke	8–0–1	5–0	T–1st			
1931	Harry Kipke	8–1–1	5–1	T–1st			
1932	Harry Kipke	8–0	6–0	T–1st			
1933	Harry Kipke	7–0–1	5–0–1	T–1st			
1934	Harry Kipke	1–7	0–6	10th			
1935	Harry Kipke	4–4	2–3	T–6th			
1936	Harry Kipke	1–7	0–5	T–9th			
1937	Harry Kipke	4–4	3–3	T–4th			
Fritz Crisler (Western Conference) (1938–1947)
1938	Fritz Crisler	6–1–1	3–1–1	T–2nd			16
1939	Fritz Crisler	6–2	3–2	T–3rd			20
1940	Fritz Crisler	7–1	3–1	2nd			3
1941	Fritz Crisler	6–1–1	3–1–1	T–2nd			5
1942	Fritz Crisler	7–3	3–0	T–3rd			9
1943	Fritz Crisler	8–1	6–0	T–1st			3
1944	Fritz Crisler	8–2	5–2	2nd			8
1945	Fritz Crisler	7–3	5–1	2nd			6
1946	Fritz Crisler	6–2–1	5–1–1	2nd			6
1947	Fritz Crisler	10–0	6–0	1st	W Rose		2 (Note: 1 in special post-bowl poll and 2 in regular final poll)
Bennie Oosterbaan (Western / Big Ten Conference) (1948–1958)
1948	Bennie Oosterbaan	9–0	6–0	1st			1
1949	Bennie Oosterbaan	6–2–1	4–1–1	T–1st			7
1950	Bennie Oosterbaan	6–3–1	4–1–1	1st	W Rose	6	9
1951	Bennie Oosterbaan	4–5	4–2	4th			
1952	Bennie Oosterbaan	5–4	4–2	4th			
1953	Bennie Oosterbaan	6–3	3–3	T–6th		19	20
1954	Bennie Oosterbaan	6–3	5–2	T–2nd		15	15
1955	Bennie Oosterbaan	7–2	5–2	3rd		13	12
1956	Bennie Oosterbaan	7–2	5–2	2nd		7	7
1957	Bennie Oosterbaan	5–3–1	3–3–1	6th			
1958	Bennie Oosterbaan	2–6–1	1–5–1	8th			
Bump Elliott (Big Ten Conference) (1959–1968)
1959	Bump Elliott	4–5	3–4	7th			
1960	Bump Elliott	5–4	1–5	T–5th			
1961	Bump Elliott	6–3	3–3	6th			
1962	Bump Elliott	2–7	1–6	10th			
1963	Bump Elliott	3–4–2	2–3–2	7th			
1964	Bump Elliott	9–1	6–1	1st	W Rose	4	4
1965	Bump Elliott	4–6	2–5	T–7th			
1966	Bump Elliott	6–4	4–3	T–3rd			
1967	Bump Elliott	4–6	3–4	T–5th			
1968	Bump Elliott	8–2	6–1	2nd		15	12
Bo Schembechler (Big Ten Conference) (1969–1989)
1969	Bo Schembechler	8–3	6–1	T–1st	L Rose	8	9
1970	Bo Schembechler	9–1	6–1	T–2nd		7	9
1971	Bo Schembechler	11–1	8–0	1st	L Rose	4	6
1972	Bo Schembechler	10–1	7–1	T–1st		6	6
1973	Bo Schembechler	10–0–1	7–0–1	T–1st		6	6
1974	Bo Schembechler	10–1	7–1	T–1st		5	3
1975	Bo Schembechler	8–2–2	7–1	2nd	L Orange	8	8
1976	Bo Schembechler	10–2	7–1	T–1st	L Rose	3	3
1977	Bo Schembechler	10–2	7–1	T–1st	L Rose	8	9
1978	Bo Schembechler	10–2	7–1	T–1st	L Rose	5	5
1979	Bo Schembechler	8–4	6–2	3rd	L Gator	19	18
1980	Bo Schembechler	10–2	8–0	1st	W Rose	4	4
1981	Bo Schembechler	9–3	6–3	T–3rd	W Bluebonnet	10	12
1982	Bo Schembechler	8–4	8–1	1st	L Rose	15	
1983	Bo Schembechler	9–3	8–1	2nd	L Sugar	9	8
1984	Bo Schembechler	6–6	5–4	T–6th	L Holiday		
1985	Bo Schembechler	10–1–1	6–1–1	2nd	W Fiesta	2	2
1986	Bo Schembechler	11–2	7–1	T–1st	L Rose	7	8
1987	Bo Schembechler	8–4	5–3	4th	W Hall of Fame	18	19
1988	Bo Schembechler	9–2–1	7–0–1	1st	W Rose	4	4
1989	Bo Schembechler	10–2	8–0	1st	L Rose	8	7
Gary Moeller (Big Ten Conference) (1990–1994)
1990	Gary Moeller	9–3	6–2	T–1st	W Gator	8	7
1991	Gary Moeller	10–2	8–0	1st	L Rose	6	6
1992	Gary Moeller	9–0–3	6–0–2	1st	W Rose	5	5
1993	Gary Moeller	8–4	5–3	T–4th	W Hall of Fame	19	21
1994	Gary Moeller	8–4	5–3	4th	W Holiday	12	12
Lloyd Carr (Big Ten Conference) (1995–2007)
1995	Lloyd Carr	9–4	5–3	T–3rd	L Alamo	19	17
1996	Lloyd Carr	8–4	5–3	T–5th	L Outback	20	20
1997	Lloyd Carr	12–0	8–0	1st	W Rose	2	1
1998	Lloyd Carr	10–3	7–1	T–1st	W Florida Citrus	12	12
1999	Lloyd Carr	10–2	6–2	T–2nd	W Orange^{†}	5	5
2000	Lloyd Carr	9–3	6–2	T–1st	W Florida Citrus	10	11
2001	Lloyd Carr	8–4	6–2	2nd	L Florida Citrus	20	20
2002	Lloyd Carr	10–3	6–2	3rd	W Outback	9	9
2003	Lloyd Carr	10–3	7–1	1st	L Rose^{†}	7	6
2004	Lloyd Carr	9–3	7–1	T–1st	L Rose^{†}	12	14
2005	Lloyd Carr	7–5	5–3	T–3rd	L Alamo		
2006	Lloyd Carr	11–2	7–1	T–2nd	L Rose^{†}	9	8
2007	Lloyd Carr	9–4	6–2	T–2nd	W Capital One	19	18
Rich Rodriguez (Big Ten Conference) (2008–2010)
2008	Rich Rodriguez	3–9	2–6	10th			
2009	Rich Rodriguez	5–7	1–7	T–10th			
2010	Rich Rodriguez	7–6	3–5	T–7th	L Gator		
Brady Hoke (Big Ten Conference) (2011–2014)
2011	Brady Hoke	11–2	6–2	2nd (Legends)	W Sugar^{†}	9	12
2012	Brady Hoke	8–5	6–2	2nd (Legends)	L Outback		24
2013	Brady Hoke	7–6	3–5	5th (Legends)	L Buffalo Wild Wings		
2014	Brady Hoke	5–7	3–5	5th (East)			
Jim Harbaugh (Big Ten Conference) (2015–2023)
2015	Jim Harbaugh	10–3	6–2	3rd (East)	W Citrus	11	12
2016	Jim Harbaugh	10–3	7–2	3rd (East)	L Orange^{†}	10	10
2017	Jim Harbaugh	8–5	5–4	4th (East)	L Outback		
2018	Jim Harbaugh	10–3	8–1	T–1st (East)	L Peach^{†}	14	14
2019	Jim Harbaugh	9–4	6–3	3rd (East)	L Citrus	19	18
2020	Jim Harbaugh	2–4	2–4	5th (East)			
2021	Jim Harbaugh	12–2	8–1	T–1st (East)	L Orange^{†} (CFP Semifinal)	3	3
2022	Jim Harbaugh	13–1	9–0	1st (East)	L Fiesta^{†} (CFP Semifinal)	3	3
2023	Jim Harbaugh	15–0	9–0	1st (East)	W Rose^{†} (CFP Semifinal); W CFP NCG^{†}	1	1
Sherrone Moore (Big Ten Conference) (2024–2025)
2024	Sherrone Moore	8–5	5–4	T–7th	W ReliaQuest		
2025	Sherrone Moore	9–4	7–2	T–4th	L Citrus	22	21
Kyle Whittingham (Big Ten Conference) (2026–present)
2026	Kyle Whittingham	6–5	3–5	T–12th	TBD		
Total:		1,028–367–36					
National championship Conference title Conference division title or championship game berth
^{†}Indicates Bowl Coalition, Bowl Alliance, BCS, or CFP / New Years' Six bowl.; ^{#}Rankings from final Coaches Poll.

== See also ==
- List of Big Ten Conference football standings (1896–1958)
- List of Big Ten Conference football standings (1959–present)
