= 1892 Northwestern Purple football team =

American college football season

1892 Northwestern Purple football
- Conference: Intercollegiate Athletic Association of the Northwest
- Record: 6–4–2 (1–3 IAANW)
- Head coach: Knowlton Ames (2nd season)
- Captain: Paul Noyes

1892 Intercollegiate Athletic Association of the Northwest football standings
| | Conf. | | | | | Overall |
| Team | W | | L | | T | W | | L | | T |
|---|---|---|---|---|---|---|---|---|---|---|
| Minnesota $ | 3 | – | 0 | – | 0 | 5 | – | 0 | – | 0 |
| Wisconsin | 2 | – | 2 | – | 0 | 4 | – | 3 | – | 0 |
| Michigan | 1 | – | 2 | – | 0 | 7 | – | 5 | – | 0 |
| Northwestern | 1 | – | 3 | – | 0 | 6 | – | 4 | – | 2 |
$ – Conference champion

The 1892 Northwestern Purple team represented Northwestern University during the 1892 college football season. The Wildcats compiled a 6–4–2 record and outscored their opponents by a combined total of 140 to 112. The team played 12 games, five of which were designated as "practice" games and seven of which were designated as official match games. The 1892 season included Northwestern's first games against teams representing Illinois, Michigan, and Minnesota.

== Schedule ==
| Date | Time | Opponent | Site | Result | Attendance | Source |
|---|---|---|---|---|---|---|
| September | | Lake View* | Evanston, IL | W 14–10 (practice) | | |
| October 1 | | Chicago YMCA* | Evanston, IL | W 16–0 (practice) | | |
| October 8 | | Chicago Athletic Association* | South Side Park; Chicago, IL | L 0–10 (practice) | 500 | |
| October 12 | | Illinois* | Champaign, IL (rivalry) | T 16–16 | | |
| October 15 | | Beloit* | Evanston, IL | W 36–0 | | |
| October 22 | 3:30 p.m. | at Chicago* | Chicago, IL | T 0–0 (practice) | 300 | |
| October 29 | | vs. Michigan | 25th Street Field; Chicago, IL (rivalry) | W 10–8 | 1,000 | |
| November 2 | | Chicago* | Evanston, IL | W 6–4 (practice) | | |
| November 8 | 2:48 p.m. | at Minnesota | Minneapolis, MN | L 12–18 | 1,000 | |
| November 12 | | Lake Forest* | Evanston, IL | W 18–0 | | |
| November 19 | | Wisconsin | Evanston, IL | L 6–26 | | |
| November 24 | 11:00 a.m. | vs. Wisconsin | Athletic Park; Milwaukee, WI | L 6–20 | | |
*Non-conference game

== Game summaries ==
=== Michigan ===
On Saturday, October 29, 1892, Northwestern played its first game against Michigan and defeated the Wolverines, 10–8. Early in the game, Michigan's left tackle Frank Decke recovered a fumble and returned it for a touchdown. George Jewett's kick for goal failed, and Michigan led, 4–0. Northwestern then tied the game when it scored a touchdown but missed the kick for goal. Later in the first half, Northwestern scored another touchdown and kicked its goal for a 10–4 lead at halftime. Michigan scored a touchdown in the second half with George Jewett leading the attack. Michigan's touchdown came on a fluke play when a Northwestern punt from deep in its own territory struck a Michigan rusher and bounced into the end zone. Woodworth fell on the ball for the touchdown. Jewett missed his second kick for goal, a kick that would have tied the game. Despite the missed kicks, the newspapers praised Jewett's play. The Chicago Daily Tribune noted: "In the second half, Jewett the big colored halfback of Ann Arbor, made a number of brilliant rushes." The game was played in 20-minute halves with 1,000 spectators in attendance. Craig of Cornell was the referee.

After the game, a large celebration took place on the Northwestern campus in a square on Davis Street. Students blew tin horns, and a large pile of barrels and boxes were set afire. Members of the football team were carried around the fire before the crowd marched to Woman's Hall.

== Roster ==
The starters for the 1892 Northwestern football team were: Pierce (center); McClusky (right guard); C. D. Wilson (left guard); A. H. Culver (right tackle); J. Q. Vandouser (left tackle); J. F. Oates (right end); John Oberne (left end); M. P. Noyes (right halfback); R. E Kennicott (left halfback); F. W. Griffith (quarterback); and R. L. Sheppard (fullback).
