= 1892 Minnesota Golden Gophers football team =

American college football season

1892 Minnesota Golden Gophers football

IAANW champion
- Conference: Intercollegiate Athletic Association of the Northwest
- Record: 5–0 (3–0 IAANW)
- Head coach: None
- Captain: William C. Leary

1892 Intercollegiate Athletic Association of the Northwest football standings
	Conf.					Overall
Team	W		L		T	W		L		T
Minnesota $	3	–	0	–	0	5	–	0	–	0
Wisconsin	2	–	2	–	0	4	–	3	–	0
Michigan	1	–	2	–	0	7	–	5	–	0
Northwestern	1	–	3	–	0	6	–	4	–	2
$ – Conference champion

The 1892 Minnesota Golden Gophers football team represented the University of Minnesota in the 1892 college football season. After the departure of Tom Eck, head coach in 1891, the University of Minnesota team played for one season without a coach. This year, an organization was formed called the Intercollegiate Athletic Association of the Northwest by representatives of Minnesota, Michigan, Wisconsin and Northwestern. Minnesota went undefeated this season, including wins over all three other members of the league, so they won the first league championship.

The game against Michigan was Minnesota's first game in the historic rivalry that would spawn the most famous of all rivalry trophies, the Little Brown Jug. The game against Northwestern was also the first meeting with that school.

== Schedule ==
Date	Time	Opponent	Site	Result	Attendance	Source
October 1		Ex-Collegiates*	Minneapolis, MN	W 18–10		
October 17		Michigan	Minneapolis, MN (rivalry)	W 14–6	800	
October 22		Grinnell*	Minneapolis, MN	W 40–24		
October 29	2:30 p.m.	at Wisconsin	Randall Field; Madison, WI (rivalry)	W 32–4		
November 8	2:48 p.m.	Northwestern	Minneapolis, MN	W 18–12	1,000	
*Non-conference game

== Roster ==
- Center, James E. Madigan
- Guards, Everhard P. Harding (right guard); Augustus T. Larson (left guard)
- Tackles George C. Sikes (right tackle); Constant Larson (left tackle)
- Ends Edgar C. Bisbee (right end); William F. Dalrymple (left end)
- Quarterback, Alfred F. Pillsbury
- Halfbacks, William C. Leary (captain and right halfback); Eugene L. Patterson (left halfback)
- Fullback, Russell H. Folwell
- Substitutes, David R. Burbank, Harry E. White, Fred W. Foote, John E. LeCrone, William C. Muir.

== Game summaries ==
=== Michigan ===
October 17, 1892, Minnesota faced Michigan in Minneapolis. The game was the first of more than 90 meetings in the Little Brown Jug rivalry. Minnesota won the game, 14–6. The game was played on a Monday afternoon during a hard rain that made the field wet and muddy. The Detroit Free Press's account of the game reported that Michigan was "badly outclassed at center and could not withstand Minnesota's rush." At the end of a 45-minute first half, Minnesota led 10-0. Michigan's only touchdown came on a long run by George Jewett in the second half. Jewett and Ralph Hayes were also praised for making "great tackles."
