= George Dygert =

American football player, coach, and lawyer (1870–1957)

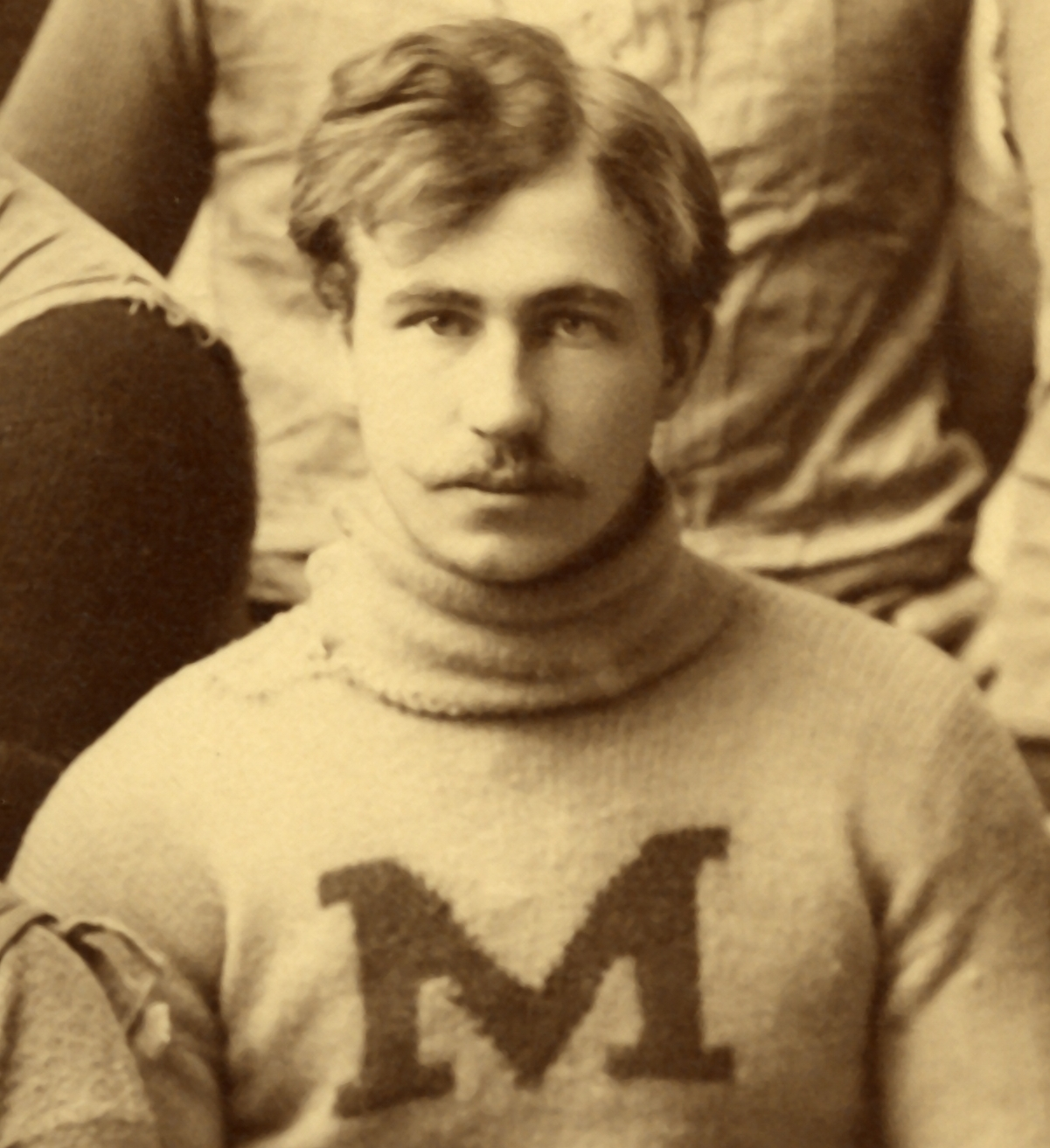
- Dygert cropped from 1893 Michigan football team photograph

Biographical details
- Born: November 25, 1870; Ann Arbor, Michigan, U.S.
- Died: April 4, 1957 (aged 86); Chicago, Illinois, U.S.

Playing career
- 1890–1894: Michigan
- 1895: Eureka
- 1896–1897: Butte
- Positions: Fullback, halfback, quarterback

Coaching career (HC unless noted)
- 1894: Ohio Wesleyan
- 1895: Eureka
- 1895: Illinois College
- 1895: Illinois State

George Burlingame "Dygie" Dygert (November 25, 1870 – April 4, 1957) was an American football player and coach and lawyer. Dygert played college football for the University of Michigan for five years, from 1890 to 1894, and was captain of the 1892 and 1893 teams. He played professional football for the Butte, Montana, football team in 1896 and 1897 and practiced law in Butte and Chicago from 1896 to 1953.

== Biography ==
=== Early years ===
Dygert was born on November 25, 1870, and raised in Ann Arbor, Michigan. He attended Ann Arbor High School where he played two years on the high school's football team, including one year as the team's captain.

=== Michigan ===
Dygert enrolled at the University of Michigan and played five years at the fullback and halfback positions for the Michigan Wolverines football team from 1890 to 1894. As a freshman in 1890, Dygert played on the first racially integrated Michigan football team, a team that featured Dygert and George Jewett, both of whom grew up in Ann Arbor, playing in the same backfield. (After Jewett, another African-American did not play football at Michigan until Willis Ward did so in the 1930s.) The 1890 Michigan team photograph shows Dygert and Jewett seated next to each other. (Cropped image at right.)

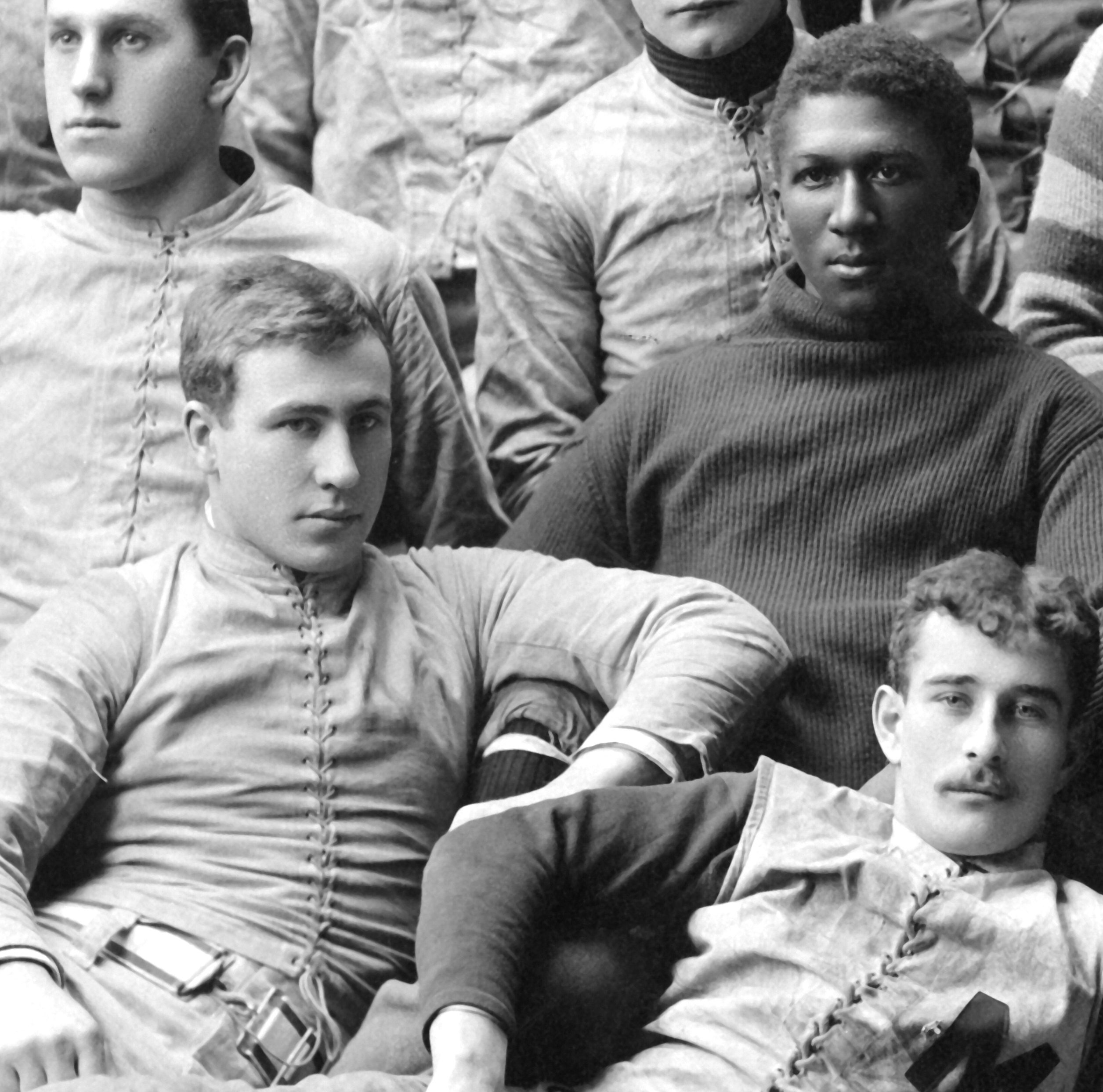
Dygert (lower left) with George Jewett (upper right) on the 1890 Michigan team

In November 1891, after Dygert's second year playing for the Wolverines, the Chicago Daily Tribune wrote:

"Dygert, full-back, has received his football as well as his intellectual education in Ann Arbor. He is short and thickset, having 158 pounds of muscle attached to five feet seven and one-half inches of length. He tackles low and hard and can be found at the bottom of almost every heap."

Dygert was elected as the team captain of the 1892 and 1893 Michigan football teams that compiled records of 7–5 and 7–3, respectively. He was also one of the leaders of the 1894 team that compiled a record of 9–1–1, outscoring opponents 244 to 84. Dygert authored an article on the 1894 season for The Michigan Alumnus in which he credited the team's manager Charles A. Baird, head coach William McCauley and trainer Keene Fitzpatrick for the team's success:

"The fall semester opened under the most favorable conditions for as fine an eleven as Michigan has ever had. Manager Charles Baird was particularly fortunate in securing the services of Mr. Macauley, tackle on Princeton's championship eleven of last year, as coach, and Mr. Keene Fitzpatrick, of Detroit's M.A.A., as trainer. The work of both these enthusiasts can be seen in the practice of the team from day to day. At a mass meeting held last month great enthusiasm was shown by the students, and several hundred dollars was raised for the team. Thus, for the first time in the history of Michigan football, the manager was enabled to secure the necessary equipment for a first-class eleven. Lack of money has been the cry hitherto."

After earning his bachelor's degree in 1893, Dygert enrolled in law school for an additional two years at the institution. When he received his undergraduate degree in June 1893, the Detroit Free Press wrote:

"Another of the men who have proved themselves to be the strongest in the public affairs of the graduating class is Mr. George B. Dygert. Everybody knows of Mr. Dygert, otherwise known as 'Dygie,' captain of the U. of M. eleven. Mr. Dygert is one of the strongest athletes in his class, and as a football player he stands at the head of the college list. In outdoor life he has been one of the most prominent members of the senior class from the beginning to the end of its course."

=== Eureka and Illinois State ===
In September and early October 1895, Dygert played quarterback for and coached the Eureka College football team. In mid-October 1895, he reportedly resigned his position at Eureka to coach the football team at Illinois Wesleyan University. In late October, he served briefly as the football coach at Illinois State University.

=== Montana ===
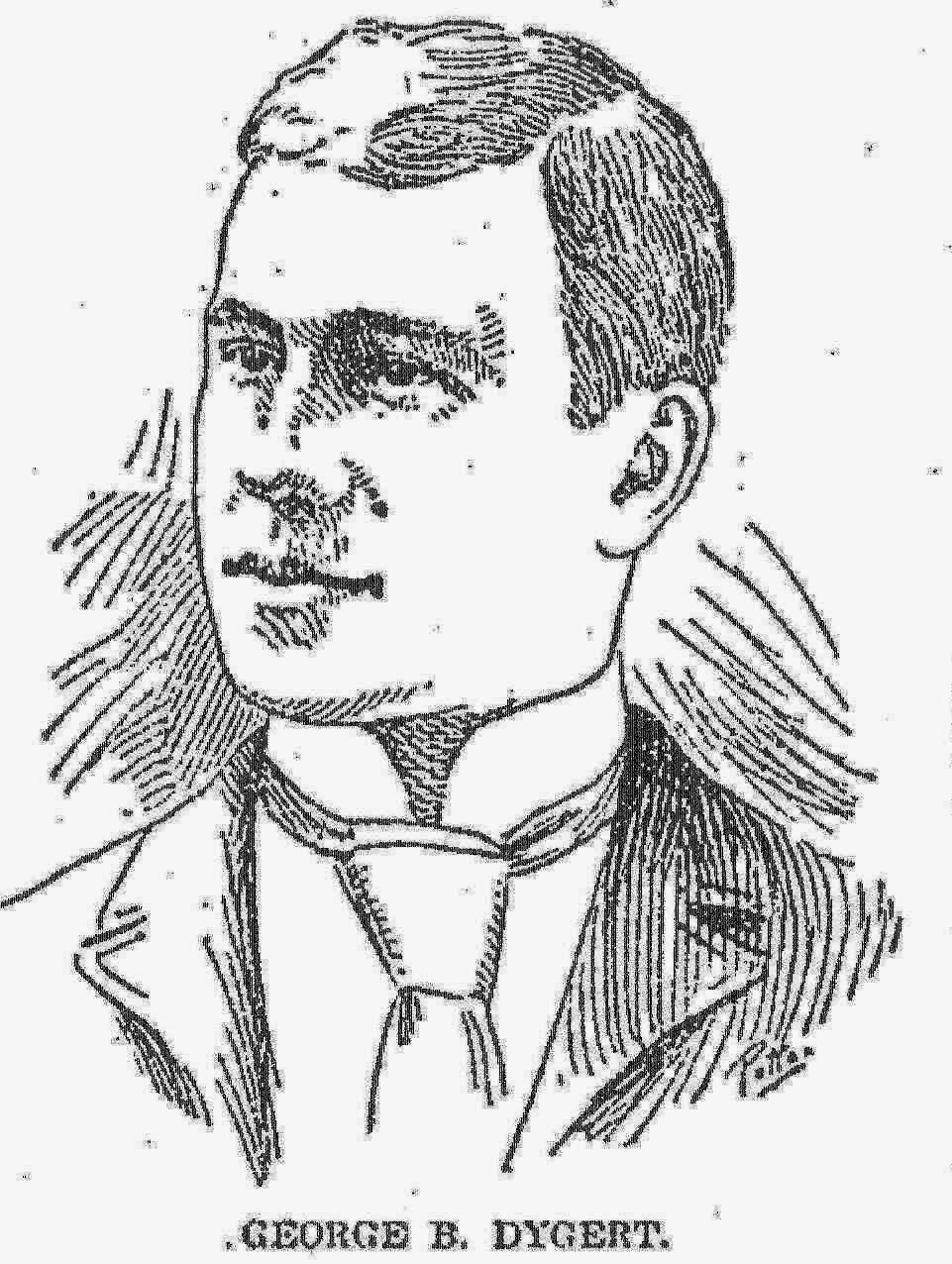
Portrait of Dygert from the Detroit Free Press, June 1893

As early as June 1893, Dygert has stated his intention of "migrating to the 'wooly west,' as he terms it." In March 1896, The Michigan Alumnus reported that he had been admitted to the bar at Butte, Montana, and had begun practice there. His law practice in Butte specialized in mining law.

In addition to his law practice, Dygert also played professional football for a team in Butte that was sponsored by mine owners. He played halfback for the Butte team in 1896 and 1897. The Los Angeles Times called the "Buttes" the best football team in the West in 1896, as they defeated the Denver Athletic Club 20–0 and the San Francisco Olympics 18–0. The Times called Butte's Christmas Day victory in San Francisco "perhaps the best football game ever put up in the West." On Thanksgiving Day in 1897, the Butte football team defeated the highly regarded Oakland Reliance team 6–4 in front of 2,000 spectators in Butte. The Associated Press account of the game credited Dygert with "tearing great holes through the Reliance line." The Butte team defeated the Reliance in a second game played three days later by a score of 4–0, and Dygert scored the game's only points on a touchdown run (scored as four points under the rules of the time). According to the Associated Press account of the game, Dygert took the ball six or eight yards from the Reliance goal and "went through the line" for the touchdown.

=== Chicago ===
In 1917, Dygert moved to Chicago, where he practiced law for 36 years.

=== Family and later years ===
Dygert married Alberta Quirk in February 1897. The couple had three children, Edward A. Dygert (born c. 1900), Jane Dygert (born c. 1903) and George B. Dygert (born c. 1906). Dygert retired in 1953 following the death of his wife, to whom he had been married for 56 years. Dygert died of a heart attack in 1957 at his home in Chicago at age 86. He was survived by his two sons and daughter.

== Head coaching record ==
Year	Team	Overall	Conference	Standing	Bowl/playoffs
Ohio Wesleyan (Independent) (1894)
1894	Ohio Wesleyan	1–3			
Ohio Wesleyan:		1–3			
Illinois College Blueboys (Independent) (1895)
1895	Illinois College	0–1			
Illinois College:		0–1			
Total:		1–4			
