= Billy Crawford (American football) =

American football player and coach, lawyer, railroad executive (1864–1933)

Biographical details
- Born: November 11, 1864; New Albany, Indiana, U.S.
- Died: September 6, 1933 (aged 68); Lexington, Kentucky, U.S.
- Education: Yale University (1886)

Playing career
- 1885: Yale
- 1890–1891: University Club of Chicago
- 1892: Chicago Athletic Association
- Positions: Quarterback, halfback

Coaching career (HC unless noted)
- 1890–1891: Butler
- 1892: Wisconsin

Head coaching record
- Overall: 11–6–1

Accomplishments and honors

Championships
- 1 Indiana Intercollegiate Athletic Association (1890)

William Randall Crawford (November 11, 1864 – September 6, 1933) was an American football player and coach, lawyer, and railroad executive. He played college football at Yale University and served as the head football coach at Butler University from 1890 to 1891 and the University of Wisconsin—now known as the University of Wisconsin–Madison—in 1892.

== Early life and college career ==
Crawford was born on November 11, 1864, in New Albany, Indiana. He was the son of Henry Crawford, a prominent lawyer in Chicago and an officer of the Wabash Railroad. Crawford played football at Yale University as a quarterback and halfback, lettering on the 1885 Yale Bulldogs football team. He was the lightest player in the history of the Yale Bulldogs football program. On November 17, 1885, he was injured during a practice when he collided with a member of the freshman team named Bishop. Crawford graduated from Yale in 1886 with a Bachelor of Arts degree.

== Football in Chicago and coaching career ==
In 1890, Crawford played for the Chicago All-University team alongside Knowlton Ames, who had played at Princeton University, and Frank G. Peters, a fellow Yale alumnus who was captain of the 1885 Yale team. Crawford scored a touchdown in a 12–8 loss to Cornell on Thanksgiving Day.

In 1890, Crawford coached the football team at Butler University, leading the team to the Indiana Intercollegiate Athletic Association title. He succeeded Clinton L. Hare, who had left Butler to coach at Purdue University in 1890. Crawford was determined to "get back" at Hare, with whom he had a personal rivalry dating back to a political fight at Yale. He returned to coach at Butler in 1891. In 1892, Crawford coached the football team at the University of Wisconsin—now known as the University of Wisconsin–Madison.

== Legal career, family, later life, and death ==
After graduating from Harvard Law School, Crawford moved to Kentland, Indiana, where he was a lawyer for a large railway. He then joined his father's law firm in Chicago. Several years later, he went to Seattle, where he practiced law and purchased the Seattle, Renton and Southern electric line, a railroad that ran from Seattle to Renton, Washington.

In December 1896, Crawford was engaged to Katherine Louise Wardner. The couple were married on February 23, 1897, in Milwaukee.

Crawford spent the last two years of his life as a resident of Lexington, Kentucky. He died in Lexington, on September 6, 1933, in an ambulance headed to St. Joseph's Hospital, after he had suffered a heart attack.

== Head coaching record ==
Year	Team	Overall	Conference	Standing	Bowl/playoffs
Butler Christians (Indiana Intercollegiate Athletic Association) (1890–1891)
1890 (Note: National Collegiate Athletic Association (NCAA) and Butler records indicate that "Clint Howe", an apparent misspelling of Clinton L. Hare, was Butler's coach in 1890, but contemporary coverage shows that Billy Crawford coached Butler in 1890, while Hare coached at Purdue University.)	Butler	3–0–1	3–0–1	1st	
1891	Butler	4–3	3–2	2nd	
Butler:		7–3–1	6–2–1		
Wisconsin Badgers (Intercollegiate Athletic Association of the Northwest) (1892)
1892 (Note: National Collegiate Athletic Association (NCAA) and Wisconsin records indicate that Frank Crawford was Wisconsin's coach in 1892, but contemporary coverage shows that Billy Crawford coached Wisconsin in 1892, while Frank coached at Baker University.)	Wisconsin	4–3	2–2	2nd	
Wisconsin:		4–3	2–2		
Total:		11–6–1			
National championship Conference title Conference division title or championship game berth
