= 1892 Michigan Wolverines football team =

American college football season

1892 Michigan Wolverines football
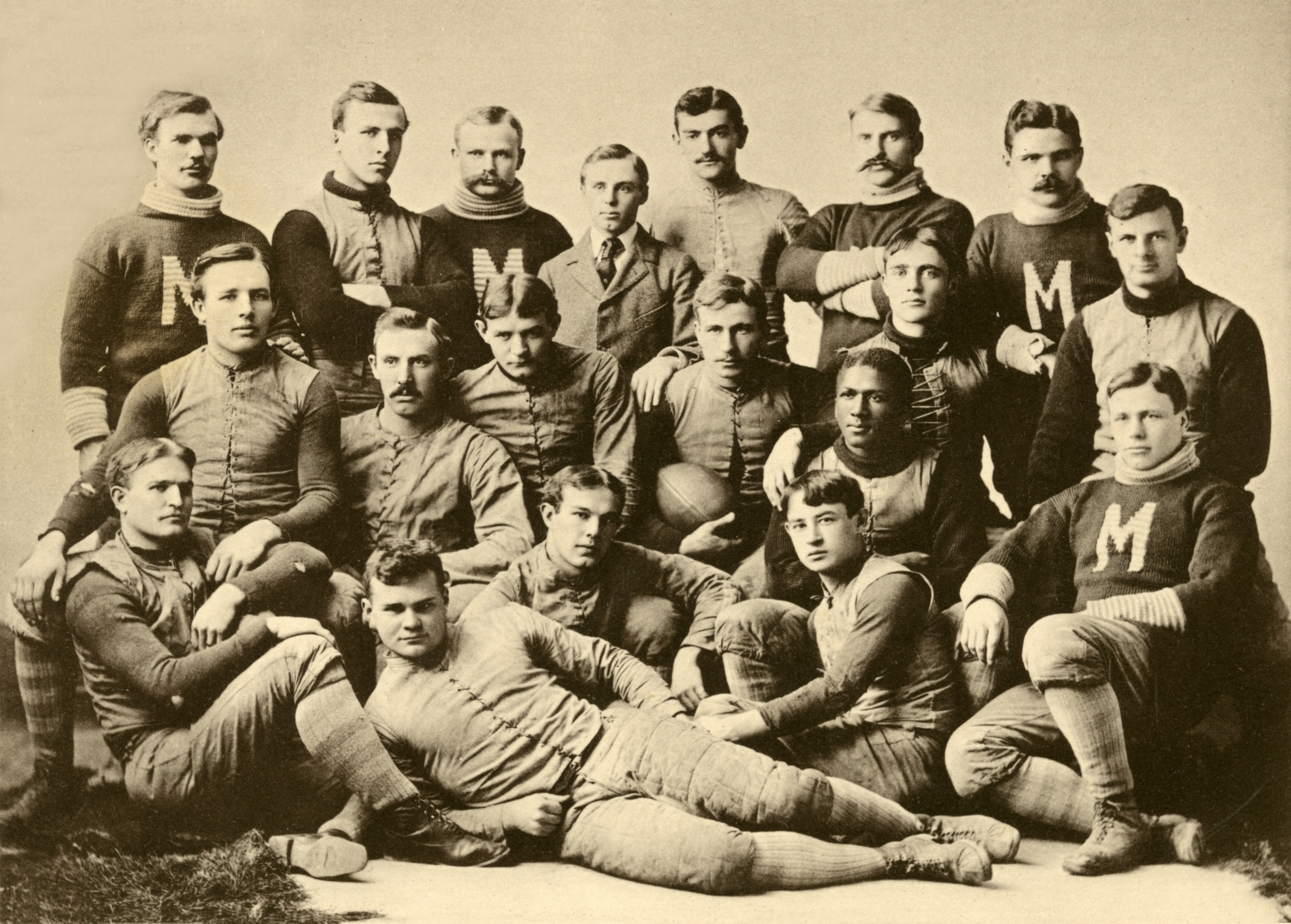
- Conference: Intercollegiate Athletic Association of the Northwest
- Record: 7–5 (1–2 IAANW)
- Head coach: Frank Barbour (1st season)
- Captain: George Dygert
- Home stadium: Ann Arbor Fairgrounds

1892 Intercollegiate Athletic Association of the Northwest football standings
	Conf.					Overall
Team	W		L		T	W		L		T
Minnesota $	3	–	0	–	0	5	–	0	–	0
Wisconsin	2	–	2	–	0	4	–	3	–	0
Michigan	1	–	2	–	0	7	–	5	–	0
Northwestern	1	–	3	–	0	6	–	4	–	2
$ – Conference champion

The 1892 Michigan Wolverines football team was an American football team that represented the University of Michigan in the 1892 college football season. In its first season under head coach Frank Barbour, the team compiled a 7–5 record and outscored its opponents by a combined score of 298 to 170. With 298 points scored, the team held the record for the most points scored in a single season by a Michigan football team until 1901.

The 1892 season was Michigan's first in the newly-formed Intercollegiate Athletic Association of the Northwest consisting of the Universities of Michigan, Minnesota, and Wisconsin, and Northwestern University. The season also included: (i) a road trip through four states in which the team played five games in 15 days; (ii) Michigan's inaugural matches against Wisconsin, Minnesota, Northwestern, and Amos Alonzo Stagg's Chicago Maroons; and (iii) a controversial game with John Heisman's Oberlin team which both teams claim to have won.

Fullback George Dygert was the team captain and started all 12 games for Michigan. Right halfback George Jewett led the team on offense and was described by coach Barbour as the best halfback he had ever seen. In 1890, Jewett became the first African American to play football at Michigan; after 1892, it was 40 years before another African American played football for the team.

== Schedule ==
Date	Time	Opponent	Site	Result	Attendance
October 8		Michigan A.A.*	Regents Field; Ann Arbor, MI	W 74–0	
October 12		vs. Michigan A.A.*	Detroit, MI	W 68–0	
October 15		at Wisconsin	Randall Field; Madison, WI	W 10–6	800
October 17		at Minnesota	Minneapolis Base Ball Park; Minneapolis, MN (rivalry)	L 6–14	800
October 22		vs. DePauw*	Old Y.M.C.A. ball grounds; Indianapolis, IN	W 18–0	1,500
October 24	3:00 p.m.	at Purdue*	Stuart Field; West Lafayette, IN	L 0–24	2,500
October 29		vs. Northwestern	25th Street Field; Chicago, IL (rivalry)	L 8–10	1,000
November 5		Albion*	Regents Field; Ann Arbor, MI	W 60–8	600
November 8		at Cornell*	Percy Field; Ithaca, NY	L 0–44	1,200
November 12		vs. Chicago*	Olympic Park; Toledo, OH (rivalry)	W 18–10	1,500
November 19		Oberlin*	Regents Field; Ann Arbor, MI	W 26–24	600
November 24		vs. Cornell*	Detroit Athletic Club grounds; Detroit, MI	L 10–30	3,000–3,500
*Non-conference game

== Season summary ==
=== Preseason ===
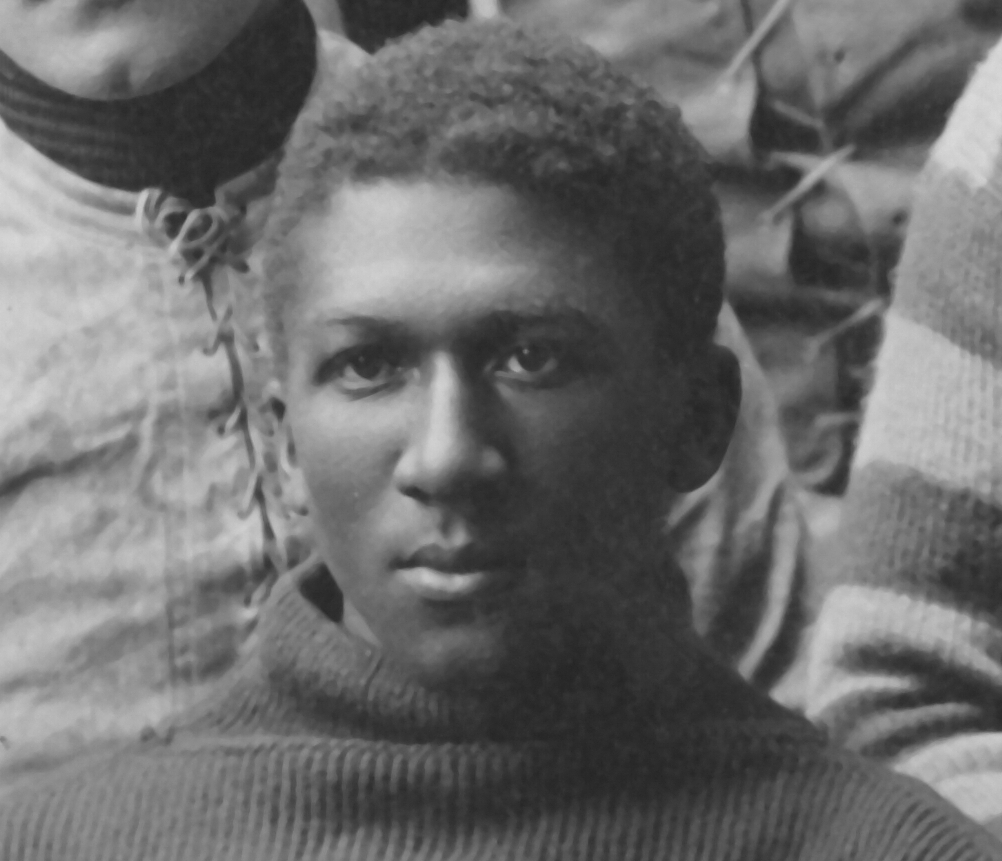
George Jewett, Michigan's first African-American football player

In April 1892, representatives of several Western colleges met at the Grand Pacific Hotel in Chicago where they formed the Western College Athletic League to compete in football, baseball and track. The members of the new league were the University of Wisconsin, University of Michigan, Northwestern University, and the University of Minnesota. The Western College Athletic League laid the foundation for what later became the Big Ten Conference. With the new alliance in place, Michigan played several teams that would become its long-time rivals. The 1892 season included Michigan's first-ever games against Wisconsin, Minnesota, Northwestern, and Chicago.

Before the season began, Michigan hired Frank Barbour of Yale as its new head football coach. Twenty men showed up for practice in mid-September. Barbour spent weeks teaching his players the fundamentals of the game. George Jewett, the first African-American to play football at Michigan, was described as the "phenomenon" of the pre-season practice. After the 1892 season, it took 40 years before another African American (Willis Ward) played for the Michigan football team.

=== Game 1: Michigan Athletic Association ===
Michigan Athletic Association at Michigan

Team	1	2	Total
Michigan Athletic Association	0	0	0
• Michigan	30	44	74

- Date: October 8
- Location: Regents Field, Ann Arbor, MI

On October 8, 1892, Michigan opened its season with a 74–0 victory over the Michigan Athletic Association team from Detroit. The game was played in 25-minute halves at Regents Field in Ann Arbor. George Jewett, credited with playing his "usual brilliant running game," scored Michigan's first touchdown and kicked the goal. Michigan's second touchdown was scored by George Dygert with Jewett kicking the goal. On Michigan's next possession, Jewett ran 75 yards for a touchdown and kicked goal. Later in the first half, Jewett returned a kick for another touchdown and again kicked goal. Michigan led, 30–0, at halftime.

In the second half, Michigan scored 44 points. Jewett scored four more touchdowns and kicked four more goals. While contemporary accounts do not record who scored each touchdown and goal, the account in The U. of M. Daily attributes at least 44 points to Jewett on seven touchdowns (four points each) and eight kicks for goal (two points each).

Michigan's lineup against M.A.A. was Ralph Waldo Emerson Hayes (right end), Willard W. Griffin (right tackle), Charles Thomas (right guard), Frank F. Harding (center rush), Virgil Tupper (left guard), Frank Henry Decke (left tackle), Woodruff [Paul Woodworth?] (left end), Edmond L. Sanderson and McAllister (quarterback), Lawrence Grosh (left halfback), Jewett (right halfback), and Dygert (fullback).

=== Game 2: at Michigan Athletic Association ===
Four days after the season opener, Michigan traveled to Detroit for a Wednesday night game against the Michigan Athletic Association. Michigan won the rematch, 68–0. Michigan scored seven touchdowns (four points each) and five goals (two points each) in the first half to take a 38–0 lead. The Wolverines added to their lead with five touchdowns, four goals, and a safety in the second half. The Detroit Free Press wrote afterward that the Michigan team "seems pretty well equipped this year" and added: "From the looks of some of them in the dressing room they have been tackling locomotives and other tough obstacles around the college town, but, like the veterans in the army, they only seem to relish it all the more when once bruised and broken up." The Michigan Athletic Association team was trained by Keene Fitzpatrick, who later gained fame as the trainer and track coach at Michigan and Princeton.

Michigan's starting lineup for the second game was Hayes (right end), W. W. Griffin (right tackle), Thomas (right guard), Harding (center), Tupper (left guard), Decke (left tackle), Woodruff [Woodworth?] (left end), McAllister (quarterback), Crozier [Grosh?] (left halfback), Jewett (right halfback), and Dygert (fullback). Sanderson replaced McAllister at quarterback in the second half.

=== Game 3: at Wisconsin ===
Michigan at Wisconsin

Team	1	2	Total
• Michigan	6	4	10
Wisconsin	0	6	6

- Date: October 15
- Location: Randall Field, Madison, WI

From October 15 to 29, 1892, Michigan conducted a five-game, 15-day road trip through Wisconsin, Minnesota, Indiana, and Illinois. The trip began on October 15 with the inaugural meeting between the Wolverines and the Wisconsin Badgers. The Wolverines won the game by a score of 10–6 before a crowd of 800 spectators at Randall Field in Madison, Wisconsin. The receipts from the game totaled approximately $300.

Michigan ran in a "V" formation in the game. According to the account published in the Chicago Tribune, George Jewett accounted for all 10 of Michigan's points with a long touchdown run and a kick for goal in the first half and a second touchdown in the second half. Wisconsin scored on a touchdown by left tackle Freeman with fullback Sumner kicking the goal.

The game account published in the Wisconsin State Journal repeatedly referred to Jewett as "the negro". The newspaper described the crowd's reaction to a tackle of Jewett: "Diving in between two of the Michigan men, he grasped the negro by the legs and brought him down. The crowd went wild, and even several of the oldest and most staid professors were seen to cheer and wave their hats." In its account of the game, the Detroit Free Press credited Jewett with "some brilliant runs."

Michigan's starting lineup against Wisconsin was Paul Woodworth (right end), W. W. Griffin (right tackle), Charles Thomas (right guard), Frank Harding (center), Virgil Tupper (left guard), Frank Henry Decke (left tackle), Ralph Waldo Emerson Hayes (left end), Edmond Sanderson (quarterback), McAllister (left halfback), Jewett (right halfback), and George Dygert (fullback). Ten of Michigan's eleven starters played the entire game. Starting center Harding was "knocked insensible" near the end of the first half and was replaced by Frederick W. Henninger.

=== Game 4: at Minnesota ===
Michigan at Minnesota

Team	1	2	Total
Michigan	0	6	6
• Minnesota	10	4	14

- Date: October 17
- Location: Minneapolis Base Ball Park, Minneapolis
- Game attendance: 800
- Referee: S. P. Jones

Two days after playing Wisconsin, Michigan faced Minnesota at the Minneapolis Base Ball Park in Minneapolis. The game was the first of more than 90 meetings in Michigan's oldest football rivalry. Minnesota won the game, 14–6. After the Saturday afternoon game in Madison, the Wolverines arrived in Minneapolis at 8 o'clock on Sunday morning. The team spent Sunday afternoon with alumni in St. Paul and visited Minnehaha Falls on Monday morning.

The game was played on Monday afternoon during a hard rain that made the field wet and muddy. Despite the rain, The Minneapolis Tribune reported that the game was played before "the largest crowd that ever witnessed a football game in the Northwest." The Saint Paul Daily Globe, on the other hand, estimate the crowd size at 800 persons. Michigan's starting center Frank Harding was unable to play due to the injury he sustained against Wisconsin. The Detroit Free Press's account of the game reported that Michigan was "badly outclassed at center and could not withstand Minnesota's rush." At the end of a 45-minute first half, Minnesota led 10-0.

Michigan's only touchdown came on a long run by George Jewett in the second half. Jewett and Ralph Hayes were also praised for making "great tackles." The Minneapolis Tribune noted that "Jewett, Ann Arbor's colored phenomenon at half-back, could win the game alone with half a chance." Jewett made gains for Michigan throughout the game, and Michigan coach Frank Barbour, who played at Yale, called Jewett "the best half-back he has ever seen."

Michigan's starting lineup against Wisconsin was Woodworth (right end), Griffin (right tackle), Thomas (right guard), Henninger (center), Tupper (left guard), Decke (left tackle), Hayes (left end), McAllister (quarterback), Grosh (left halfback), Jewett (right halfback), and Dygert (fullback). The only substitutions for Michigan were McAllister (replacing Grosh at left halfback in the first half), Sanderson (replacing McAllister at quarterback), and Southworth (replacing Woodworth at right end in the second half).

=== Game 5: vs. DePauw ===
Michigan vs. DePauw

Team	1	2	Total
• Michigan	18	0	18
DePauw'	0	0	0

- Date: October 21
- Location: Old Y.M.C.A. ball grounds, Indianapolis
- Game attendance: 1,500

On October 21, 1892, Michigan defeated DePauw, 18–0, before a crowd of 1,500 spectators at the old Y.M.C.A. ball grounds in Indianapolis. The game began at 4:00 p.m., having been delayed by the city's Columbian parade. Right halfback George Jewett scored 14 of Michigan's 18 points. On the opening drive, he ran around the end for 40 yards, McAllister scored on the next play, and Jewett kicked goal to give Michigan a 6–0 lead. On the next drive by DePauw, Jewett twice tackled DePauw's back, the latter time for a 10-yard loss. Michigan regained possession on a fumble, and on the first play of the drive, Jewett ran some 50 yards for a touchdown and kicked goal to give Michigan a 12–0 lead. On Michigan's third possession, Jewett "skated across the field as he pleased", scoring the third touchdown and kicked the goal to put Michigan ahead, 18–0. Darkness made play difficult in the second half, and the game was ended soon after the second half began.

According to the Detroit Free Press, the Wolverines "did sharp work" for the first 15 minutes of the game, scoring all 18 points in that time. The Wolverines reportedly lost their vigor in the remainder of the game.

The Indianapolis Journal wrote that Jewett "played a brilliant game and was as elusive as a will-'o-the-wisp." During the game, a spectator yelled to a DePauw player, "Kill the nigger," referring to Jewett, who was playing a brilliant game. On hearing the comment, Jewett approached the spectator "with a leap like a panther" and his "fist shot out". When the spectator picked himself up, he didn't know where he was. Jewett returned to the game in time for the next play "as unconcerned as though he had just made an easy buck at the center."

Michigan's lineup against DePauw was Paul Woodworth (left end), Frank Decke (left tackle), Virgil Tupper (left guard), Frank Harding (center), Charles Thomas (right guard), W. W. Griffin (right tackle), Charles Southworth (right end), Ed Sanderson (quarterback), Jewett (right halfback), McAllister (left halfback), and George Dygert (fullback).

=== Game 6: at Purdue ===
Michigan at Purdue

Team	1	2	Total
Michigan	0	0	0
• Purdue	12	12	24

- Date: October 24
- Location: Stuart Field, Lafayette, IN
- Game attendance: 2,500

On Monday, October 24, 1892, Michigan lost to Purdue, 24–0, before a crowd of 2,500 spectators at Stuart Field in Lafayette, Indiana. The game was the second meeting between the two schools, Michigan having won the first game in 1890.

The game began at 3:00 p.m. Purdue scored two touchdowns and kicked both goals to take a 12-0 lead at halftime. Purdue scored another two touchdowns and two goal from touchdown in the second half. Michigan sustained multiple injuries, and team captain George Dygert was injured on Purdue's fourth touchdown run. Michigan had no more replacements left to substitute into the game, so Purdue was allowed to kick its goal from touchdown, and the game was then called.

The strain of playing five games in 13 days showed in the play of the Michigan team. The Detroit Free Press described a spate of injuries that eventually led to the game's early termination: "Michigan's team was crippled at several points as it went on the field. Jewett's right ankle was very weak, and McAllister's back and neck still used up from the De Pauw game. Harding was hurt almost at the beginning, and was forced to retire before the middle of the half. . . . Jewett was in no condition to play the game, and Freund had to take his place soon after Harding retired. . . . At the opening of the second half McAllister had his leg so strained that he gave his place to Woodworth, Southworth playing end. Soon after Dygert's ankle gave way and the game was called, since Michigan had no sixteenth man to enter the game."

After the game, Purdue fans celebrated with "ringing of bells, parades and fireworks."

Michigan's starting lineup against Purdue was Powers (right end), W. W. Griffin (right tackle), Thomas (right guard), Harding (center), Tupper (left guard), Decke (left tackle), Woodworth (left end), Sanderson (quarterback), McAllister (left halfback), Jewett (right halfback), and Dygert (fullback). Players appearing in the game solely as substitutes for Michigan were Bird (right guard), Freund (right halfback), and Southworth (left end).

=== Game 7: vs. Northwestern ===
Michigan vs. Northwestern

Team	1	2	Total
Michigan	4	4	8
• Northwestern	10	0	10

- Date: October 29
- Location: 25th Street Field, Chicago
- Game attendance: 1,000
- Referee: Craig (Cornell)

Michigan concluded its 15-day road trip with its first-ever football game against Northwestern. The game was played in Chicago on Saturday, October 29, 1892, and Michigan lost, 10–8. The Michigan team arrived in Chicago shortly before 8 p.m. on Friday evening and spent the night at the Tremont Hotel. The game was played in 20-minute halves with 1,000 spectators in attendance.

Early in the game, Michigan's left tackle Frank Decke recovered a fumble and returned it for a touchdown. George Jewett's kick for goal failed, and Michigan led, 4–0. Northwestern then tied the game when it scored a touchdown but missed the kick for goal. Later in the first half, Northwestern scored another touchdown and kicked its goal for a 10–4 lead at halftime. Michigan scored a touchdown in the second half with Jewett leading the attack. Michigan's touchdown came on a fluke play when a Northwestern punt from deep in its own territory struck a Michigan rusher and bounced into the endzone. Woodworth fell on the ball for the touchdown. Jewett missed his second kick for goal, a kick that would have tied the game. Despite the missed kicks, the newspapers praised Jewett's play. The Chicago Daily Tribune noted: "In the second half, Jewett the big colored halfback of Ann Arbor, made a number of brilliant rushes." The Detroit Free Press reported that "Bray, Jewett and Decke carried off the honors for the U. of M."

After the game, a large celebration took place on the Northwestern campus in a square on Davis Street. Students blew tin horns, and a large pile of barrels and boxes were set afire. Members of the football team were carried around the fire before the crowd marched to Woman's Hall.

Michigan's starting lineup against Northwestern was Smith (right end), Bray (right tackle), Thomas (right guard), Spangler (center), Griffin (left guard), Decke (left tackle), Woodworth (left end), McAllister (quarterback), Leonard (left halfback), Jewett (right halfback), and Dygert (fullback).

=== Game 8: Albion ===
Albion at Michigan

Team	1	2	Total
Albion	4	4	8
• Michigan	30	30	60

- Date: November 5
- Location: Regents Field, Ann Arbor, MI
- Game attendance: 600

On November 5, 1892, Michigan played its second home game of the year. The Wolverines defeated Albion by a decisive score of 60–8. The game was played in halves of 45 minutes in front of 600 spectators at Regents Field. Michigan scored 10 touchdowns and converted on all 10 kicks for goal from touchdown. The Detroit Free Press reported: "The university team played a sprinting game, nearly every touchdown being made after long runs and skillful dodging." George Jewett, in particular, was credited with playing a "great game", having kicked nine consecutive goals after touchdown. Dygert kicked the 10th goal. The score was evenly divided between the two halves, with Michigan scoring 30 points and Albion four points in each half. Contemporaneous newspaper accounts do not detail which players scored Michigan's 10 touchdowns, though Jewett, Dygert, and Leonard were credited with long runs.

The game was marked by rough play. Michigan's left guard Jefferis received a "vicious kick" in the back, the sound of which could be heard in the grandstand. Jefferis left the game and was replaced by Hall. Michigan's right end Hayes accused Albion's fullback Mulholland of putting fingers in his mouth and trying "to tear him." An Albion player also accused Michigan's left tackle Bray of slugging him in the face.

Michigan's lineup against Albion was James Bird and Hiram Powers (left end), Bray (left tackle), Albert Jefferis and Hall (left guard), Charles T. Griffin (center), Frederick W. Henninger (right guard), W. W. Griffin (right tackle), Ralph Waldo Emerson Hayes (right end), Edmond L. Sanderson (quarterback), Jewett and McAllister (left halfback), Herman B. Leonard (right halfback), and George Dygert (fullback).

=== Game 9: at Cornell ===
Michigan at Cornell

Team	1	2	Total
Michigan	0	0	0
• Cornell	28	16	44

- Date: November 8
- Location: Percy Field, Ithaca, NY
- Game attendance: 1,200

On November 8, 1892, three days after playing Albion, Michigan played a Tuesday afternoon game against Cornell before a crowd of 1,200 spectators at Percy Field in Ithaca, New York. The Wolverines lost the game, 44–0. Michigan reportedly made good gains through center, "used the wedge effectively" and "tackled hard, but guarded poorly and fumbled continually." The play of right halfback George Jewett was also a bright spot. The Cornell Sun wrote that, "as the crowd thronged out of the gates every one was asking his companion, who was the phenominal [sic] right half-back with the U. of M. team."

The team's rigorous travel schedule, likely the toughest ever undertaken by a Michigan team, took a toll. The Detroit Free Press reported: "The Michigan eleven was really beaten before entering the game. The men had slept but two or three hours Monday night and were consequently in poor trim for the contest."

Michigan's lineup against Cornell was Powers (left end), Dickie (left tackle), Hall (left guard), C. T. Griffin (center), Henninger (right guard), W. W. Griffin (right tackle), Hayes (right end), Sanderson (quarterback), Freund (left halfback), Jewett (right halfback), and Dygert (fullback).

=== Game 10: vs. Chicago ===
On November 13, 1892, Michigan played its first game against the Chicago Maroons. Michigan had originally been scheduled to play Lehigh in Toledo, but the opponent was changed to Chicago. A group of 300 traveled by train from Ann Arbor, escorted the team to Boody House, and "showed Toledo how college boys take a city by storm."

The game was played at Toledo's Olympic Park on a wet and muddy field. The crowd was estimated at 700 by the Detroit Free Press and at 1,500 by the Chicago Tribune. Michigan won the game by a score of 18 to 10. As the Michigan team took the field, the players were greeted by 300 Michigan students making "an unearthly howl ending with their college yell."

Amos Alonzo Stagg was Chicago's coach, team captain, and starting right halfback. Decke scored Michigan's first touchdown, and Jewett kicked goal to give Michigan a 6–0 lead. Shortly thereafter, Rapp scored for Chicago, but the goal was missed, and Michigan led, 6–4. Decke then scored Michigan's second touchdown with Jewett again kicking goal to extend the lead to 12–4. Jewett was later stopped for a safety, and the lead narrowed to 12–6. Stagg then scored on a long run but missed the kick for gal, and the score stood at 12–10 at the end of a 45-minute first half. Michigan scored one touchdown in the second half and kicked goal. Jewett had a "remarkable run" dodging tacklers just before the clock expired.

The Chicago Tribune described the game as a "triangular contest between the mud and the two teams" and noted that, by the end of the game, the players "resembled walking clay models from a sculptor's studio."

Michigan's starting lineup against Chicago was Hayes (right end), W. W. Griffin (right tackle), Thomas (right guard), C. T Griffin (center), Henninger (left guard), Decke (left tackle), Woodworth (left end), Sanderson (quarterback), Leonard (left halfback), Jewett (right halfback), and Dygert (fullback).

=== Game 11: Oberlin ===
Oberlin at Michigan

Team	1	2	Total
Oberlin	18	6	24
• Michigan	22	4	26

- Date: November 19
- Location: Regents Field, Ann Arbor, MI
- Referee: Ensworth (Oberlin)

On November 19, 1892, Michigan played a close game against an undefeated Oberlin team led by player-coach John Heisman. The outcome of the game was, and remains, disputed. Michigan records the game as a 26–24 victory, while Oberlin does not count the final Michigan touchdown and records the game as a 24–22 victory for Oberlin.

George Jewett scored Michigan's first touchdown on 45-yard run around the right end. He also kicked goal, and Michigan led, 6–0. Williams then scored for Oberlin, and Hart kicked goal to tie the score. Savage scored Oberlin's second touchdown, and Hart again kicked goal to put Oberlin ahead, 12–6. Michigan scored three additional touchdowns in the first half, two by Jewett and one by W. W. Griffin. Jewett converted two out of the three kicks for goal from touchdown. Oberlin also scored another touchdown and kicked goal. At halftime, Michigan led, 22–18.

The second half consisted of only three short drives before the game ended in controversy. Michigan began the half with possession and fumbled. On Oberlin's first possession of the second half, Savage took the ball at Oberlin's two-yard line and ran 103 yards to Michigan's five-yard line where Jewett caught up and tackled him. Two plays later, Hart scored a touchdown and Oberlin kicked goal to take a 24–22 lead. On the next possession after Hart's touchdown, Michigan ran two plays when the referee Ensworth, a substitute player for Oberlin, called time and the entire Oberlin team "ran off the field so quickly it almost seemed prearranged." A Harvard man in the audience approached Oberlin's manager Hogen to say that "Oberlin would be everlastingly disgraced among reputable Rugby teams if she persisted," but the Oberlin team refused to play out the game, boarded its bus, and left for its hotel. Michigan refused to accept the ruling and, with the support of the umpire (Horace Greely Prettyman of Michigan), handed the ball to Jewett who walked for Michigan's claimed fifth touchdown.

The U. of M. Daily opined that Oberlin had played a strong game but had "neutralized the good impression" by "leaving the field several minutes before time was up." In another account, the Daily detailed the clock controversy as follows: "Referee Ensworth, an Oberlin substitute, lost all tab of time, and called the game at fourteen minutes to five, while the captain of each team had agreed to play until ten minutes before the hour. Time-keeper Spangler also verifies this. Captain Williams immediately got his team into the bus and were driven to their hotel. All expostulations with the Oberlin captain and manager were of no avail. Umpire Prettyman had the time and says that Mr. Ensworth did not take out a four minutes wait during the latter part of the half when one of the players was recovering from an injury."

Adding to the intrigue, the Chicago Tribune reported that Michigan's left tackle "Doc" Pearson had earlier been ejected from the game and in turn slugged the referee – the Oberlin man who later called the game over.

The Detroit newspapers reported that Michigan had won the game, while Oberlin newspapers reported that Oberlin had won. More than a century later, the controversy continued as the Oberlin Alumni Magazine published an article titled "The Day Oberlin Beat Michigan, Or Did We?"

Michigan's lineup against Oberlin was Woodworth (left end), Pearson and Bird (left tackle), Thomas (left guard), C. T. Griffin (center), Henninger (right guard), W. w. Griffin (right tackle), Hayes (right end), Sanderson (quarterback), Leonard and Freund (left halfback), Jewett (right halfback), and Dygert (fullback).

=== Game 12: vs. Cornell ===
Cornell vs. Michigan

Team	1	2	Total
• Cornell	20	10	30
Michigan	0	10	10

- Date: November 24
- Location: Detroit Athletic Club, Detroit
- Game attendance: 3,000–3,500

On Thanksgiving Day, November 24, 1896, Michigan lost a second game to Cornell by a 30–10 score. The game was played in Detroit on the Detroit Athletic Club grounds. Attendance was reported as 3,000 by The U. of M. Daily and 3,500 by the Detroit Free Press.

Cornell dominated the first half, scoring four touchdowns and kicking two goals from touchdown to take a 20–0 lead. In the second half, each team scored 10 points, but the deficit created in the first half gave the victory to Cornell. George Jewett scored Michigan's first touchdown and also kicked the goal. Moving the ball with Jewett, Michigan relied on a trick play. The U. of M. Daily described the play: "Jewett got the ball on the pass back. The whole team started, gridiron fashion, to the left, and Jewett, after a few yards, appeared at the right side. It fooled Cornell badly and Jewett made 25 yards." After Jewett had already been tackled, a second Oberlin player, Witherbee, "came in on a gallop and dropped hard on Jewett's head." Jewett got up, "smashed Witherbee on the nose", and was ejected from the game. Charles Rittenger, substituting for Jewett, scored Michigan's final touchdown.

Michigan's starting lineup against Cornell was Ralph Waldo Emerson Hayes (right end), W. W. Griffin (right tackle), Frederick W. Henninger (right guard), C. T Griffin (center), Charles Thomas (left guard), Frank Decke (left tackle), Paul Woodworth (left end), Edmond Sanderson (quarterback), Lawrence Grosh and Raynor Freund (left halfback), Jewett and Charles Rittenger (right halfback), and George Dygert (fullback). Freund and Rittenger appeared as substitutes.

=== Growing interest among students and alumni ===
In January 1893, an article by Ralph Stone (1868–1956), who later served as a Regent of the University of Michigan, appeared in The Inlander. Stone expressed hope that the development of a rivalry with the University of Chicago might help overcome the "woeful" lack of loyalty to alma mater manifested in the university's alumni. He wrote:

"The apparent lack of patriotism among our alumni is largely due to the fact that while in college there was little or no incentive to college spirit, so-called, growing out of contests with other colleges. Michigan has always been without a near-at-hand rival. Therefore, her alumni were born, brought up, and graduated into the world without much of an opportunity to yell, fight and bet upon her college base-ball team, foot-ball team, or crew. Perhaps the University of Chicago, under the leadership of Stagg, may alter matters in this respect in the near future. . . . The athletic competition which is now awakening will rouse a more active display of their latent enthusiasm, and it will do it without sacrificing the real and more serious purpose of the University. While we deplore the excessive attention now paid at times to athletics, we cannot deny that athletic prestige does much to help a university in more substantial ways."

== Personnel ==
=== Varsity letter winners ===
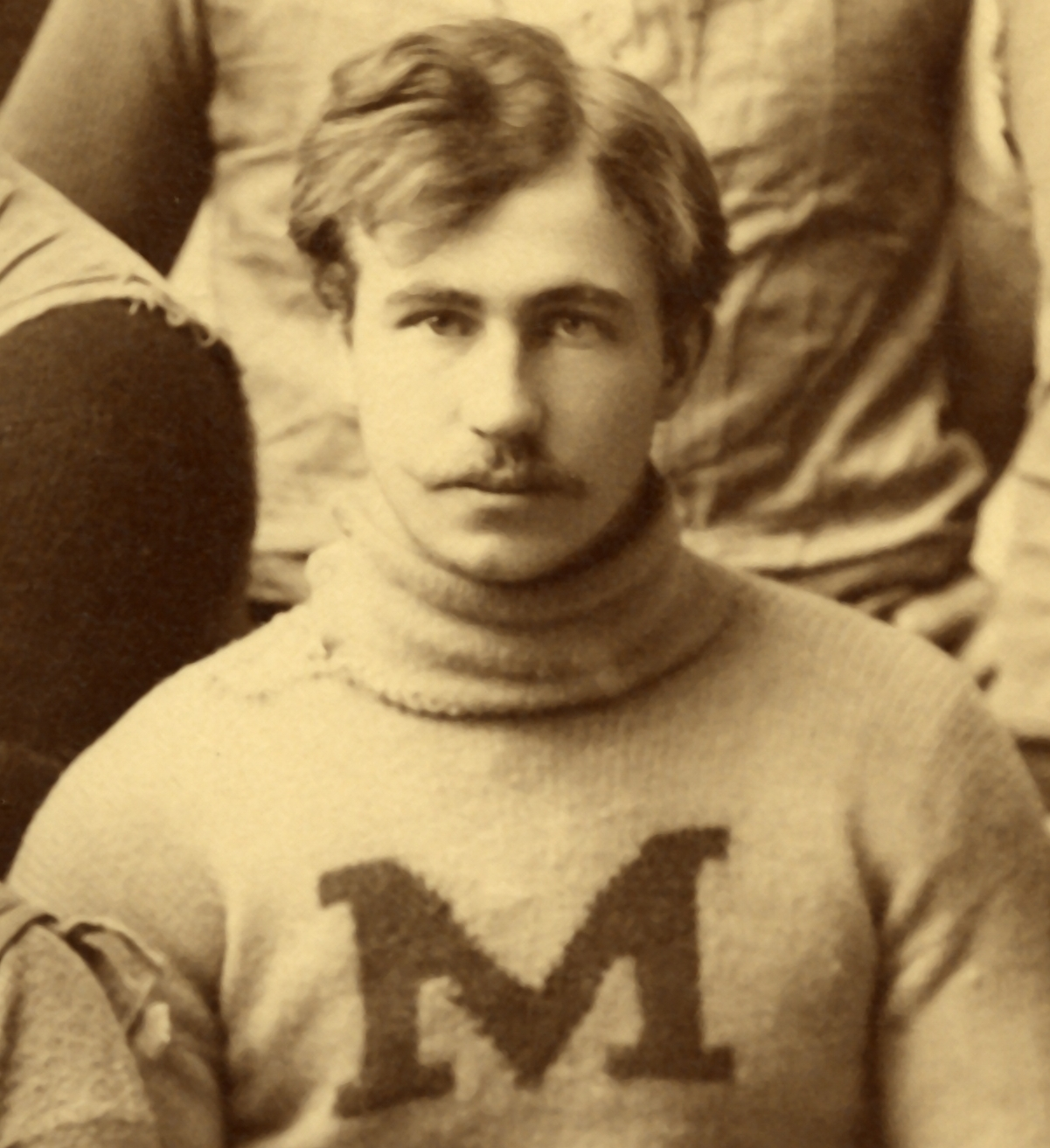
Captain George Dygert started all 12 games at fullback.

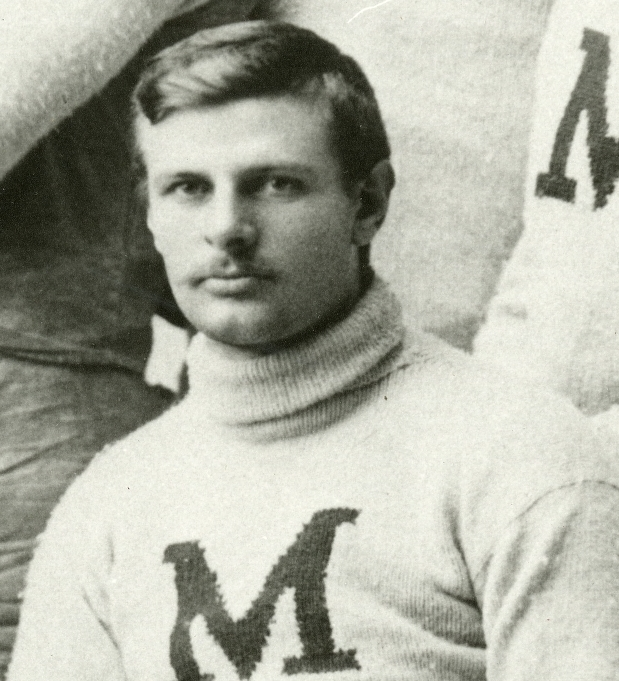
Left guard Charles Thomas later coached Nebraska.

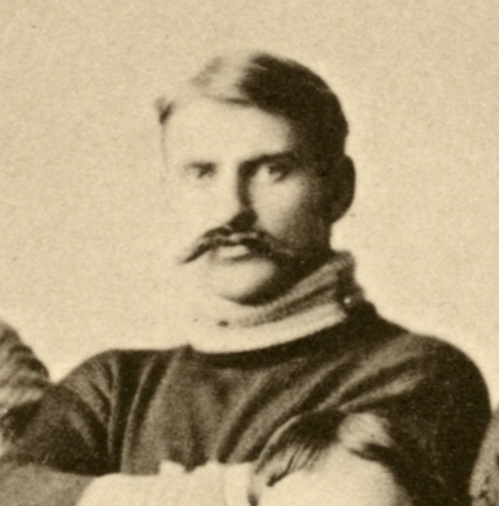
Right guard Virgil Tupper became a noted surgeon.

=== Starting lineup ===
The following 17 players received varsity letters for their participation on Michigan's 1892 football team.

- James Pyper Bird, Ann Arbor, Michigan
- Frank Decke, Lansing, MI – started 9 games at left tackle
- George Dygert, Ann Arbor, MI – team captain and started 12 games at fullback
- Raynor Spaulding Freund, Reserve, Montana - started 1 game at left halfback, 1 game at right halfback
- Charles T. Griffin, Kingsbury, IN - started 5 games at center
- Willard Wilmer Griffin, Wenona, IL – started 11 games at right tackle, 1 game at left guard
- Lawrence C. Grosh, Toledo, OH – started 4 games at left halfback
- Frank F. Harding, San Juan, Puerto Rico -started 5 games at center
- Ralph Waldo Emerson Hayes, Galva, IL – started 7 games at right end, 2 games at left end
- George Jewett, Ann Arbor, MI – started 11 games at right halfback, 1 game at left halfback
- Herman B. Leonard, Bloomington, IL - started 4 games at left halfback
- William W. "Doc" Pearson, Springfield, IL - started 1 game at left tackle
- Hiram Powers, Buffalo, NY - started 1 game at left end, 1 game at right end
- Edmond Lindsay Sanderson, Detroit – started 9 games at quarterback
- Charles Thomas, Omaha, NE – started 10 games at left guard
- Virgil Tupper, Bay City, MI – started 6 games at right guard
- Paul Woodworth, Pigeon, MI – started 8 games at left end and 2 games at right end

=== Other players ===
The following players are listed in Michigan's 1892 roster or game summaries as having also participated on the 1892 team.

- William Aldrich, Coldwater, MI – guard
- James Baird, Chicago –
- Eugene Batavia, Kansas City, MO – halfback
- Walter W. Drew, Grand Rapids, MI – end
- George Greenleaf, Brazil, IN – end
- Alfred Whipple Hall – started 1 game at left guard
- Frederick W. Henninger, Barberton, OH – started 4 game at right guard, 1 game at left guard, 1 game at center
- Charles Mead Holt, West Epping, NH – quarterback
- Albert W. Jefferis, Omaha, NE – started 1 game at left guard
- Andrew Watson Lockton, Marshall, MI – guard
- Ira M. Long, Niles, MI – fullback
- McAllister – started 3 games at quarterback, 3 games at left halfback
- Allen Henry Mead, Oberlin, OH – tackle
- Louis P. Paul, Massillon, OH – halfback
- Charles Fred Rittenger, Dayton, OH – halfback
- Charles Wilson Southworth, Forestville, New York
- Timon J. Spangler, Mitchell, SD – started 1 games at center
- Louis Grant Whitehead, Vulcan, MI – fullback
- Octavius John Wray, Red Jacket, MI – tackle

=== Coaching and administrative staff ===
- Coach: Frank Barbour
- Manager: William E. Griffin
