= 1892 Indiana Hoosiers football team =

American college football season

1892 Indiana Hoosiers football
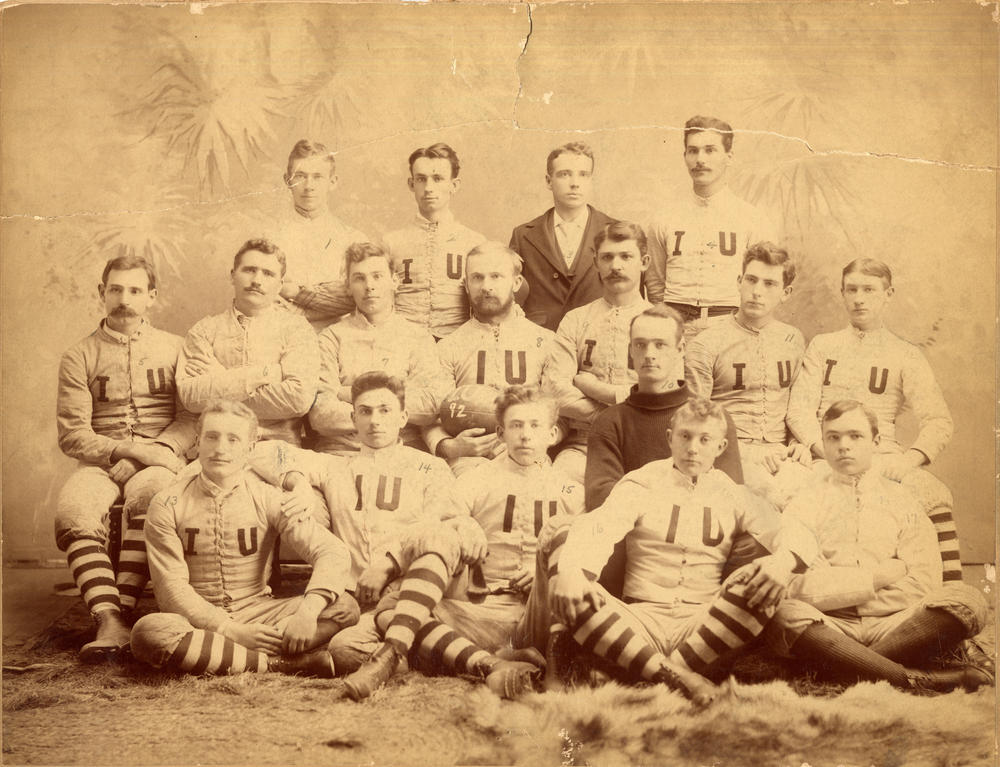
- Conference: Indiana Intercollegiate Athletic Association
- Record: 0–4 (0–4 IIAA)
- Head coach: Couch
- Captain: John Shafer
- Home stadium: Indiana University grounds

1892 Indiana Intercollegiate Athletic Association football standings
	Conf.					Overall
Team	W		L		T	W		L		T
Purdue $	4	–	0	–	0	8	–	0	–	0
Butler	4	–	1	–	0	5	–	1	–	0
Wabash	1	–	4	–	0	1	–	4	–	0
Indiana	0	–	4	–	0	0	–	4	–	0
$ – Conference champion

The 1892 Indiana Hoosiers football team was an American football team that represented Indiana University Bloomington during the 1892 college football season. Indiana played four games and compiled a 0–4 record, losing games to Butler (10–6), DePauw (forfeit), Purdue (68–0), and Wabash (36–24). The Butler game was contested by Indiana, and the IIAA offered Indiana the chance to reschedule the game. Indiana never would reschedule the game, instead opting to forfeit the game to Butler.

== Schedule ==
Date	Time	Opponent	Site	Result	Attendance	Source
October 15		Butler	Indiana University grounds; Bloomington, IN	L 6–10		
October 29		at DePauw	Greencastle, IN	L (forfeit)		
November 12		at Purdue	Stuart Field; West Lafayette, IN (rivalry)	L 0–68	1,000	
November 19	3:30 p.m.	at Wabash	Crawfordsville, IN	L 24–36		

== Personnel ==
=== Roster ===
Name	Pos.	Year
J. J. Mitchell	Substitute	
John A. Shafer (C)	Center	
J. Maley	Substitute	
William Youtsler		
W. D. Milroy		
Harry Herriman	Left Guard	
James Henry Cullen	Right End	
Walter Hattle	Left Halfback	
Charles Greathouse	Left Tackle	
Blackaeter	Left End	
Dick Miller	Substitute	
Sanford Teter		
Charles Jackman	Right Guard	
Sam Murdock		
Stewart	Right Tackle	
Mark P. Helm	Quarterback	
Harry "Dutch" Schuler	Fullback	
Preston Eagleson	Right Halfback	Fr.
