= Frank Barbour =

American football player, coach, and businessman (1870–1948)

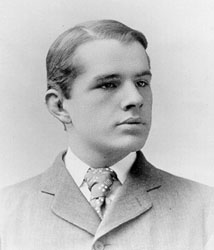

Biographical details
- Born: April 3, 1870; Bangor, Maine, U.S.
- Died: February 4, 1948 (aged 77); Canajoharie, New York, U.S.

Playing career
- 1890–1891: Yale
- Position: Quarterback

Coaching career (HC unless noted)
- 1892–1893: Michigan

Head coaching record
- Overall: 14–8

Francis Edward Barbour (April 3, 1870 – February 4, 1948) was an American college football player and coach and businessman. He played quarterback for the Yale University football team in 1890 and 1891 and helped lead the 1891 Yale team to a perfect 13–0 record and a national championship. He was the head coach of the University of Michigan football team in 1892 and 1893, compiling an overall record of 14–8 in two years as head coach. Barbour later had a lengthy business career. After spending 17 years with the New York Central Railroad, he joined the Beech-Nut Packing Company in 1910 and established its chewing gum business. He remained with Beech-Nut for 38 years and served as chairman of the board from 1946 to 1948.

== Early years ==
Barbour was born in Bangor, Maine, in 1870. His father, William McLeod Barbour (1827–1899), was a minister who emigrated from Scotland to the United States in 1851, and became a professor of theology at Yale University. His mother was Eliza A. (Ransom) Barbour, a native of New York. At the time of the 1880 Census, Barbour was ten years old and residing in New Haven, Connecticut, with his parents and four older siblings. Barbour attended the public schools in New Haven, and subsequently enrolled at the Phillips Exeter Academy. He was the captain of Exeter's football team in 1888.

== Yale University ==
Barbour attended Yale University and graduated Ph.B. at Yale's Sheffield Scientific School in 1892. While at Yale, he was the quarterback of the Yale Bulldogs football teams of 1890 and 1891. The 1891 Yale team was coached by Walter Camp and included College Football Hall of Fame inductees, Pudge Heffelfinger, Frank Hinkey, Josh Hartwell and Lee McClung. With Barbour as the starting quarterback, the 1891 team finished with a perfect 13–0 record and a national championship. In November 1891, The New York Times wrote: "Barbour has made great improvements since last year, and is one of the best men on the Yale team. He is cool, passes well and sure, uses his signals to good advantage and is an excellent player. He is considered a much superior player to the Harvard quarterback."

== University of Michigan ==
In 1892, Barbour was hired as the head football coach at the University of Michigan. He was the school's second head football coach. In the three years before Barbour's arrival, Michigan had played a total of 17 games. As the coach of the 1892 Michigan Wolverines football team, Barbour expanded the team's schedule to twelve games and took the team on its first extended road trip to the West. Over the course of a two-week period from October 15 to 29, 1892, Barbour's team played five road games against Wisconsin (a 10–6 win on the 15th), Minnesota (a 14–6 loss on the 17th), DePauw (an 18–0 win on the 22nd), Purdue (a 24–0 loss on the 24th) and Northwestern (a 10–8 loss on the 29th). The 1892 team also defeated Chicago, 18–10, in a game played at Toledo, Ohio, but suffered two losses to Cornell.

Barbour returned the following year as the coach of the 1893 Michigan Wolverines football team. The 1893 team improved to 7–3. The team closed the season with five consecutive wins over Purdue, DePauw, Northwestern, Kansas and Chicago by a combined score of 202 to 24. The team's 72–6 victory over Northwestern was the team's second highest point total in the first 22 years of the program's history.

Barbour compiled an overall record of 14–8 in two years as head coach. He also returned to Michigan in 1894 for part of the season to assist in developing the football team. The 1894 team compiled a 9–1–1 record and outscored its opponents by a combined score of 244 to 84.

At Yale, Barbour had played for Walter Camp, regarded as the "Father of American Football." At Michigan, Barbour was credited with bringing the "Yale methods" to Michigan and laying the foundation for the championship teams that followed in 1894 and 1895. In 1900, a student publication called The Inlander summarized Barbour's legacy as follows:

"In 1893 Frank Barbour, an old Yale quarterback, coached Michigan and taught the men, who afterward made Michigan famous, Yale methods. He was not a great coach in every sense of the term, but he knew the game and had a class of apt scholars. From him Michigan learned the style of interference which, with the right kind of men, has always been successful. From him 'Jimmie' Baird learned the quarterback's duties so well that in the end the pupil undoubtedly passed the teacher."

== Business career ==
Barbour also had a lengthy career in business. He was associated with the New York Central & Hudson Valley Railroad from 1892 to 1909. He worked as a traffic clerk for the New York Central Railroad and lived in Montreal, Quebec, Canada from 1892 to 1898. He also served for a time as a passenger agent for the Rutland Railway, which was owned by the New York Central Railroad, in Rutland, Vermont. In 1898, he was appointed as traveling agent for the railroad. In 1902, he was appointed general agent of the passenger department of the New York Central & Hudson River R.R. at Montreal, where he resided for a second time from 1902 to 1907.

Barbour's brother had been involved in founding American Chicle Company, the originator of Chiclets. In 1910, Barbour went into business with his brother-in-law, Bartlett Arkell, who had founded the Beech-Nut Packing Company. Until that time, Beech-Nut had been a producer of high-grade foodstuffs. On Barbour's recommendation, Beech-Nut entered the chewing gum business. Barbour traveled extensively in Guatemala, Honduras, British Honduras (now known as Belize) and the Yucatán to procure the company's supply of chicle, the rubbery sap of the sapota tree that was the key ingredient in chewing gum. Barbour served as a director of Beech-Nut from 1910 to 1948 and became vice president in 1921. Chewing gum eventually became Beech-Nut's most successful product, providing $11 million of the company's $18 million in sales in 1935. As of 1925, Barbour and Arkell were the vice president and president, respectively, of Beech-Nut. In 1946, following Arkell's death, Barbour was elected as the chairman of the board of Beech-Nut.

In addition to his work with Beech-Nut, Barbour also served as a vice president and director of the Utica Mutual Insurance Co., and as vice president and director of the Montgomery Electric Light & Power Co., which provided electricity to Palatine Bridge, Canajoharie, Sharon Springs, Ames and Cherry Valley, New York.

== Marriage and death ==
In September 1908, Barbour married Bertelle Arkelle Gillam in Canajoharie, New York. She had previously been married to the noted cartoonist, Bernhard Gillam, who died in 1896. At the time of the 1910 Census, Barbour and his wife were residing in Canajoharie, and Barbour listed his occupation as vice president of a packing plant. Barbour resided in Canajoharie for the next 38 years. They lived in a stone home of East Hill in Canajoharie; the house was built in 1888 by Senator and Mrs. James Arkell, the parents of Barbour's wife. The home had extensive grounds and was considered "one of the beauty spots of the Mohawk valley."

Barbour died on February 4, 1948, at his home in Canajoharie. He was survived by his wife, Bertelle, and his brother, James R. Barbour. According to his will probated in Montgomery County Surrogate's Court in December 1948, Barbour left an estate of $1,308,151. Barbour's wife created the Arkell Hall Foundation which funded the Arkell Museum and provides residential and community facilities for the senior population in Canajoharie.

== Head coaching record ==
Year	Team	Overall	Conference	Standing	Bowl/playoffs
Michigan Wolverines (Intercollegiate Athletic Association of the Northwest) (1892–1893)
1892	Michigan	7–5	1–2	3rd	
1893	Michigan	7–3	1–2	3rd	
Michigan:		14–8	2–4		
Total:		14–8			
