= Virgil Tupper =

American physician and surgeon (1869–1951)

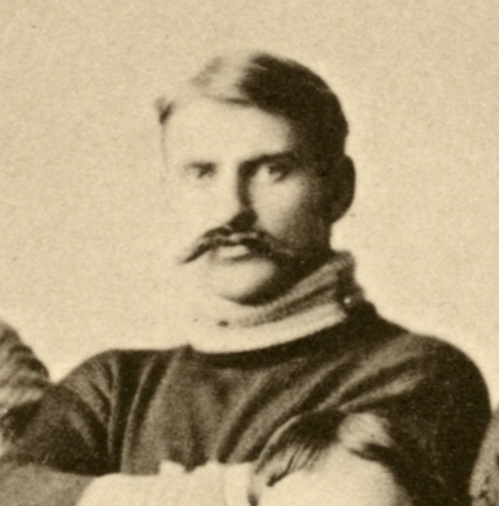
- Virgil Tupper, 1892
- Born: March 14, 1869; Oil City, Pennsylvania, United States
- Died: April 13, 1951 (aged 82); Bay City, Michigan
- Education: University of Michigan
- Known for: Physician

Virgil Langstaff Tupper (March 14, 1869 – April 13, 1951) was an American physician and surgeon.

== Early years ==
Tupper was born in Pennsylvania in 1869. He was the son of Benjamin and Selena (Bonnell) Tupper. As a child, Tupper was sent to live with his uncle, Dr. Horace Tupper (1830-1902), in Bay City, Michigan. He attended the public schools in Bay City and then studied at Washington and Jefferson College for one year.

== University of Michigan ==
Tupper next attended the University of Michigan where he received a Bachelor of Arts degree from the Literary Department. He played college football at the guard position for the 1891 and 1892 Michigan Wolverines football teams.

== Medical career ==
Tupper subsequently attended Jefferson Medical College in Philadelphia, receiving his degree in 1896. He also studied at Johns Hopkins University in Baltimore, taking specialized courses in gynecology, surgery and children's diseases. He returned to Bay City and took over the medical practice of his uncle, Dr. Horace Tupper. In 1908, Tupper ceased his general practice and specialized in surgery. He was reportedly the first physician in Michigan to use x-ray therapy and among the first to use gas anaesthetic and perform bone-grafting surgery.

== Family and later years ==
He married Mary Hill Cranage in 1901, and they had two children, Thomas C. Tupper and Marjory Tupper. He shared ownership of the Cranage Block in Bay City with his brother-in-law, Samuel P. Cranage. He died in April 1951 at age 83.

== See also ==
- 1891 Michigan Wolverines football team
- 1892 Michigan Wolverines football team
