= 1892 Purdue Boilermakers football team =

American college football season

1892 Purdue Boilermakers football
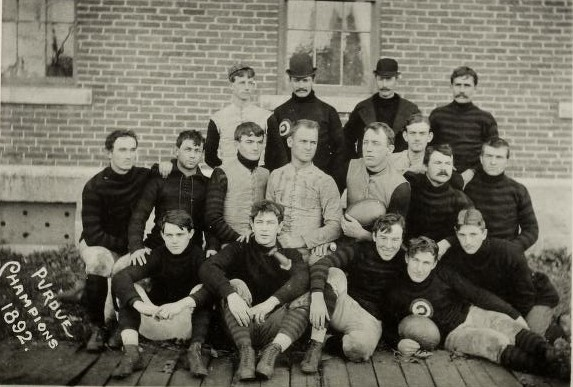

IIAA champion
- Conference: Indiana Intercollegiate Athletic Association
- Record: 8–0 (4–0 IIAA)
- Head coach: Knowlton Ames (2nd season)
- Captain: Archibald Stevenson
- Home stadium: Stuart Field

1892 Indiana Intercollegiate Athletic Association football standings
	Conf.					Overall
Team	W		L		T	W		L		T
Purdue $	4	–	0	–	0	8	–	0	–	0
Butler	4	–	1	–	0	5	–	1	–	0
Wabash	1	–	4	–	0	1	–	4	–	0
Indiana	0	–	4	–	0	0	–	4	–	0
$ – Conference champion

The 1892 Purdue Boilermakers football team represented Purdue University in the 1892 college football season. In their second year under head coach Knowlton Ames, the Boilermakers compiled an undefeated 8–0 record (5–0 Big Ten) and outscored their opponents by a total of 320 to 24, including victories over Illinois (12–6), Wisconsin (32–4), Michigan (24–0), Indiana (68–0), and Chicago (38–0). Archibald Stevenson was the team captain.

== Schedule ==
Date	Time	Opponent	Site	Result	Attendance	Source
October 8		at Illinois*	Illinois Field; Champaign, IL (rivalry)	W 12–6		
October 15		at Wabash	Crawfordsville, IN	W 72–0		
October 19	3:30 p.m.	Wisconsin*	Stuart Field; West Lafayette, IN	W 34–6		
October 24	3:00 p.m.	Michigan*	Stuart Field; West Lafayette, IN	W 24–0	2,500	
October 29		Butler	Stuart Field; West Lafayette, IN	W 40–6		
November 12		Indiana	Stuart Field; West Lafayette, IN (rivalry)	W 68–0	1,000	
November 19		Chicago*	Stuart Field; West Lafayette, IN (rivalry)	W 38–0		
November 24		vs. DePauw	Indianapolis, IN	W 32–6	10,000	
*Non-conference game

== Players ==
- H. L. Browne, quarterback
- Leon Crowell, left end
- Larry Downs, left guard
- Bill Finney, left tackle
- A. L. Fulkerson, left guard
- Gerber, left tackle
- Joseph R. Hudelson, halfback
- Alpha Jamison, left halfback
- S. M. Kintner, quarterback
- Jesse Little, right tackle
- Walt Muessel, right guard
- Edwin Olin, end
- Cecil Polk, right end
- Archibald Stevenson, center
- Jimmy Studebaker, fullback
- Jack Thompson, right halfback
