= 1892 Wisconsin Badgers football team =

American college football season

1892 Wisconsin Badgers football
- Conference: Intercollegiate Athletic Association of the Northwest
- Record: 4–3 (2–2 IAANW)
- Head coach: Billy Crawford (1st season)
- Captain: John D. Freeman
- Home stadium: Randall Field

1892 Intercollegiate Athletic Association of the Northwest football standings
	Conf.					Overall
Team	W		L		T	W		L		T
Minnesota $	3	–	0	–	0	5	–	0	–	0
Wisconsin	2	–	2	–	0	4	–	3	–	0
Michigan	1	–	2	–	0	7	–	5	–	0
Northwestern	1	–	3	–	0	6	–	4	–	2
$ – Conference champion

The 1892 Wisconsin Badgers football team represented the University of Wisconsin as a member of the Intercollegiate Athletic Association of the Northwest (IAANW) during the 1892 college football season. Led by Billy Crawford in his first and only season as head coach, the Badgers compiled an overall record of 4–3 with a mark of 2–2 in conference playing, placing second in the IAANW. The team's captain was John D. Freeman.

Crawford had coached the football team at Butler University the year before.

== Schedule ==
Date	Time	Opponent	Site	Result	Attendance	Source
October 1	2:30 p.m.	Beloit*	Randall Field; Madison, WI	W 30–4		
October 15		Michigan	Randall Field; Madison, WI	L 6–10	800	
October 19	3:30 p.m.	at Purdue*	Stuart Field; West Lafayette, IN	L 6–34		
October 22		vs. Lake Forest*	Athletic Park; Milwaukee, WI	W 10–6		
October 29	2:30 p.m.	Minnesota	Randall Field; Madison, WI (rivalry)	L 4–32		
November 19		at Northwestern	Jordan Field; Evanston, IL	W 26–6		
November 24	11:00 a.m.	vs. Northwestern	Athletic Park; Milwaukee, WI	W 20–6		
*Non-conference game
