= George Jewett Trophy =

American college football rivalry trophy

- Michigan Wolverines Northwestern Wildcats
- First meeting: October 29, 1892; Northwestern 10, Michigan 8
- Latest meeting: November 15, 2025; Michigan 24, Northwestern 22
- Next meeting: 2028
- Stadiums: Michigan Stadium; Ann Arbor, Michigan, U.S. Ryan Field; Evanston, Illinois, U.S.

Statistics
- Total meetings: 78
- All-time series: Michigan leads 61–15–2 (.795)
- Trophy series: Michigan, 3–0
- Largest victory: Michigan, 69–0 (1975)
- Longest win streak: Michigan, 19 (1966–1992)
- Current win streak: Michigan, 9 (2011–present)

Locations of Michigan and Northwestern

The George Jewett Trophy is an American college football rivalry trophy awarded to the winner of the Michigan–Northwestern football game. The trophy was established in 2021 in honor of George Jewett.

== History ==
=== George Jewett ===
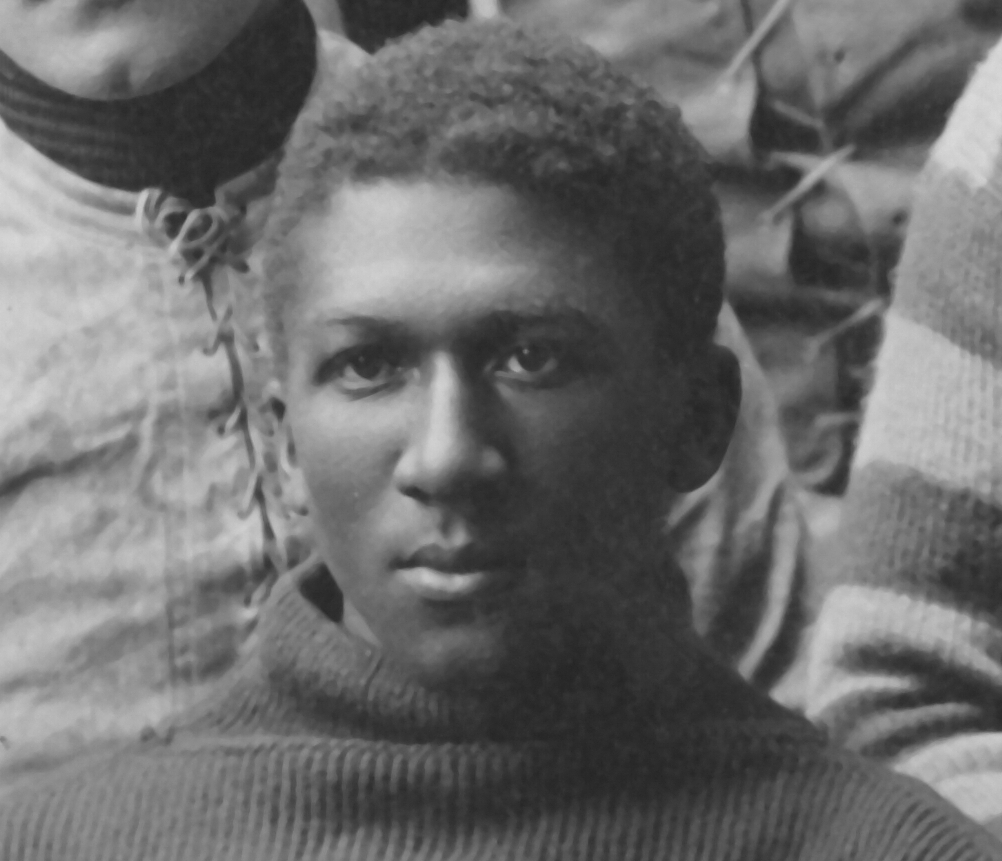
George Jewett with Michigan in 1890

The Michigan Wolverines and Northwestern Wildcats first played on October 29, 1892 in Chicago. In that game, Michigan's first African American player, George Jewett, kicked a field goal and led Michigan's play on both offense and defense. Despite Jewett's effort, Northwestern prevailed by a score of 10–8. Jewett transferred to Northwestern in 1893 and also became its first African American football player. Jewett scored Northwestern's only touchdown in its 1893 loss to Michigan.

=== Pre-trophy games ===
The Wildcats won six out of the first thirteen games before Michigan began to dominate the series. The two programs were co-champions of the Big Ten in the 1926, 1930 and 1931 seasons. In 1925, Northwestern halted Michigan's march to a national championship with a 3–2 victory on a muddy Soldier Field. The three points scored by Northwestern were the only points allowed that season by the 1925 Michigan team. Wolverines head coach Fielding H. Yost called his team "the greatest football team I ever saw in action”.

In 1948, the schools met with Michigan ranked No. 4 in the AP Poll and Northwestern at No. 3. Michigan forced four turnovers and prevailed by a score of 28–0, as the Wolverines jumped to No. 1 en route to a national championship that season. The Wildcats returned to prominence under head coach Ara Parseghian, defeating the Wolverines in consecutive games in 1958 and 1959. Following Parseghian's departure, the series reached its lowest point as Michigan won 19 consecutive games from 1966 to 1992.

In 1995, No. 25 Northwestern scored 10 unanswered points in the fourth quarter to shock No. 6 Michigan, 19–13. The Wildcats took advantage of four Michigan turnovers, and Pat Fitzgerald led Northwestern with 14 tackles, including two tackles for a loss. It was Northwestern's first victory over Michigan in 30 years, and first win in Ann Arbor since 1959. This upset led Northwestern to a 10–2 season, reaching as high as No. 3 in the rankings. The Wildcats won their first Big Ten Conference title that season since 1936, and were invited to play in the Rose Bowl for the first time since 1948. Additional Northwestern upsets of highly ranked Michigan teams in 1996 and 2000 were key in Northwestern's Big Ten title winning seasons. The 1995, 1996 and 2000 teams are Northwestern's only three Big Ten champions in the AP Poll era. Prior to the creation of the Jewett Trophy, Michigan held a 58–15–2 advantage in the series.

== Establishment of trophy ==
=== 2021 ===
In 2021, the University of Michigan and Northwestern University announced the creation of the George Jewett Trophy to be awarded to the football game's winner. The trophy honors George Jewett, who was the first African American college football player to play in the Big Ten Conference and at both schools. This marked the first Football Bowl Subdivision (FBS) rivalry game trophy named for an African American player. Michigan won the inaugural George Jewett Trophy on October 23, 2021, when the No. 6 ranked Wolverines defeated the Wildcats 33–7 at Michigan Stadium.

=== 2024 ===
They played for the second time in the trophy series on November 23, 2024. The Wolverines came in to the game as the reigning national champions, but failed to replicate the success of seasons past, entering the game with a 5–5 record as they met the 4–6 Wildcats. Michigan defeated Northwestern 50–6 in the penultimate game of the regular season, retaining the George Jewett and improving to 2–0 in the trophy game. Running back Kalel Mullings rushed for three touchdowns as Michigan became bowl eligible with the win.

== Game results ==
Michigan victories	Northwestern victories	Tie games

No.	Date	Location	Winning team		Losing team	
1	October 29, 1892	Chicago	Northwestern	10	Michigan	8
2	November 18, 1893	Ann Arbor	Michigan	72	Northwestern	6
3	November 5, 1898	Evanston	Michigan	6	Northwestern	5
4	October 19, 1901	Ann Arbor	Michigan	29	Northwestern	0
5	November 24, 1917	Evanston	Northwestern	21	Michigan	12
6	November 1, 1919	Ann Arbor	Michigan	16	Northwestern	13
7	November 8, 1924	Ann Arbor	Michigan	27	Northwestern	0
8	November 7, 1925	Chicago	Northwestern	3	Michigan	2
9	October 8, 1932	Ann Arbor	Michigan	15	Northwestern	6
10	November 25, 1933	Evanston	Michigan	13	Northwestern	0
11	November 24, 1934	Ann Arbor	Northwestern	13	Michigan	6
12	November 14, 1936	Ann Arbor	No. 1 Northwestern	9	Michigan	0
13	October 9, 1937	Evanston	Northwestern	7	Michigan	0
14	November 12, 1938	Ann Arbor	Tie	0	Tie	0
15	November 16, 1940	Ann Arbor	No. 6 Michigan	20	No. 10 Northwestern	13
16	October 18, 1941	Evanston	No. 6 Michigan	14	No. 5 Northwestern	7
17	October 17, 1942	Ann Arbor	No. 3 Michigan	34	Northwestern	16
18	October 2, 1943	Evanston	Michigan	21	Northwestern	7
19	October 14, 1944	Ann Arbor	No. 12 Michigan	27	Northwestern	0
20	October 6, 1945	Evanston	Michigan	20	Northwestern	7
21	October 19, 1946	Ann Arbor	Tie	14	Tie	14
22	October 18, 1947	Evanston	No. 1 Michigan	49	Northwestern	21
23	October 16, 1948	Ann Arbor	No. 4 Michigan	28	No. 3 Northwestern	0
24	October 15, 1949	Evanston	Northwestern	21	No. 7 Michigan	20
25	November 18, 1950	Ann Arbor	Michigan	34	Northwestern	23
26	November 17, 1951	Ann Arbor	Northwestern	6	Michigan	0
27	October 18, 1952	Evanston	Michigan	48	Northwestern	14
28	October 17, 1953	Ann Arbor	No. 5 Michigan	20	Northwestern	12
29	October 16, 1954	Evanston	Michigan	7	Northwestern	0
30	October 15, 1955	Ann Arbor	No. 1 Michigan	14	Northwestern	2
31	October 20, 1956	Ann Arbor	No. 8 Michigan	34	Northwestern	20
32	October 19, 1957	Ann Arbor	No. 18 Michigan	34	Northwestern	14
33	October 18, 1958	Evanston	No. 17 Northwestern	55	No. 19 Michigan	24
34	October 17, 1959	Ann Arbor	No. 2 Northwestern	20	Michigan	7
35	October 15, 1960	Ann Arbor	Michigan	14	Northwestern	7
36	November 2, 1963	Ann Arbor	Michigan	27	Northwestern	6
37	October 31, 1964	Ann Arbor	Michigan	35	Northwestern	0
38	November 13, 1965	Evanston	Northwestern	34	Michigan	22
39	November 12, 1966	Ann Arbor	Michigan	28	Northwestern	20
40	November 4, 1967	Ann Arbor	Michigan	7	Northwestern	3

No.	Date	Location	Winning team		Losing team	
41	November 2, 1968	Evanston	No. 9 Michigan	35	Northwestern	0
42	September 11, 1971	Evanston	No. 4 Michigan	21	No. 20 Northwestern	6
43	September 16, 1972	Ann Arbor	No. 11 Michigan	7	Northwestern	0
44	October 18, 1975	Ann Arbor	No. 7 Michigan	69	Northwestern	0
45	October 16, 1976	Evanston	No. 1 Michigan	38	Northwestern	7
46	November 5, 1977	Ann Arbor	No. 6 Michigan	63	Northwestern	20
47	November 11, 1978	Evanston	No. 7 Michigan	59	Northwestern	14
48	September 8, 1979	Ann Arbor	No. 7 Michigan	49	Northwestern	7
49	September 13, 1980	Ann Arbor	No. 11 Michigan	17	Northwestern	10
50	October 24, 1981	Ann Arbor	No. 18 Michigan	38	Northwestern	0
51	October 23, 1982	Evanston	Michigan	49	Northwestern	14
52	October 15, 1983	Ann Arbor	No. 13 Michigan	35	Northwestern	0
53	October 13, 1984	Ann Arbor	Michigan	31	Northwestern	0
54	October 31, 1987	Ann Arbor	Michigan	29	Northwestern	6
55	October 29, 1988	Evanston	No. 14 Michigan	52	Northwestern	7
56	November 9, 1991	Ann Arbor	No. 4 Michigan	59	Northwestern	14
57	November 7, 1992	Evanston	No. 4 Michigan	40	Northwestern	7
58	October 7, 1995	Ann Arbor	No. 25 Northwestern	19	No. 6 Michigan	13
59	October 5, 1996	Evanston	No. 22 Northwestern	17	No. 6 Michigan	16
60	October 11, 1997	Ann Arbor	No. 6 Michigan	23	Northwestern	6
61	October 17, 1998	Evanston	Michigan	12	Northwestern	6
62	November 6, 1999	Ann Arbor	No. 16 Michigan	37	Northwestern	3
63	November 4, 2000	Evanston	No. 21 Northwestern	54	No. 12 Michigan	51
64	November 15, 2003	Evanston	No. 5 Michigan	41	Northwestern	10
65	November 13, 2004	Ann Arbor	No. 9 Michigan	42	Northwestern	20
66	October 29, 2005	Evanston	No. 25 Michigan	33	No. 21 Northwestern	17
67	October 28, 2006	Ann Arbor	No. 2 Michigan	17	Northwestern	3
68	September 29, 2007	Evanston	Michigan	28	Northwestern	16
69	November 15, 2008	Ann Arbor	Northwestern	21	Michigan	14
70	October 8, 2011	Evanston	No. 12 Michigan	42	Northwestern	24
71	November 10, 2012	Ann Arbor	Michigan	38	No. 25 Northwestern	31^{OT}
72	November 16, 2013	Evanston	Michigan	27	Northwestern	19^{3OT}
73	November 8, 2014	Evanston	Michigan	10	Northwestern	9
74	October 10, 2015	Ann Arbor	No. 18 Michigan	38	No. 13 Northwestern	0
75	September 29, 2018	Evanston	No. 14 Michigan	20	Northwestern	17
76	October 23, 2021	Ann Arbor	No. 6 Michigan	33	Northwestern	7
77	November 23, 2024	Ann Arbor	Michigan	50	Northwestern	6
78	November 15, 2025	Chicago	No. 18 Michigan	24	Northwestern	22
Series: Michigan leads 61–15–2: 3–0 in trophy games (bold dates)

== See also ==
- List of NCAA college football rivalry games
- Bears–Lions rivalry
- Bulls–Pistons rivalry
- Blackhawks–Red Wings rivalry
