= Intercollegiate Athletic Association of the Northwest =

- Founded: 1892
- Folded: 1893
- No. of teams: 4

Locations
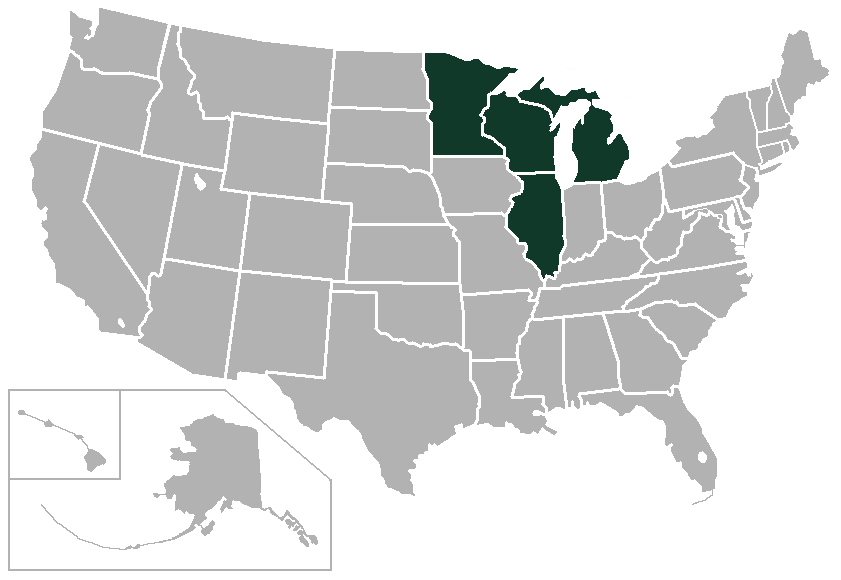

The Intercollegiate Athletic Association of the Northwest was a college athletic conference from 1892 to 1893 in the Upper Midwest of the United States. Four universities were members: the University of Michigan, the University of Minnesota, Northwestern University and the University of Wisconsin–Madison. The conference was formed to compete in football, baseball and track. It only survived for two seasons before disbanding due to financial problems throughout the league. The four schools came together again, along with Purdue University, the University of Chicago and the University of Illinois, to found the Intercollegiate Conference of Faculty Representatives a couple of years later, known today as the Big Ten Conference.

== Formation ==
Formation of the Intercollegiate Athletic Association of the Northwest
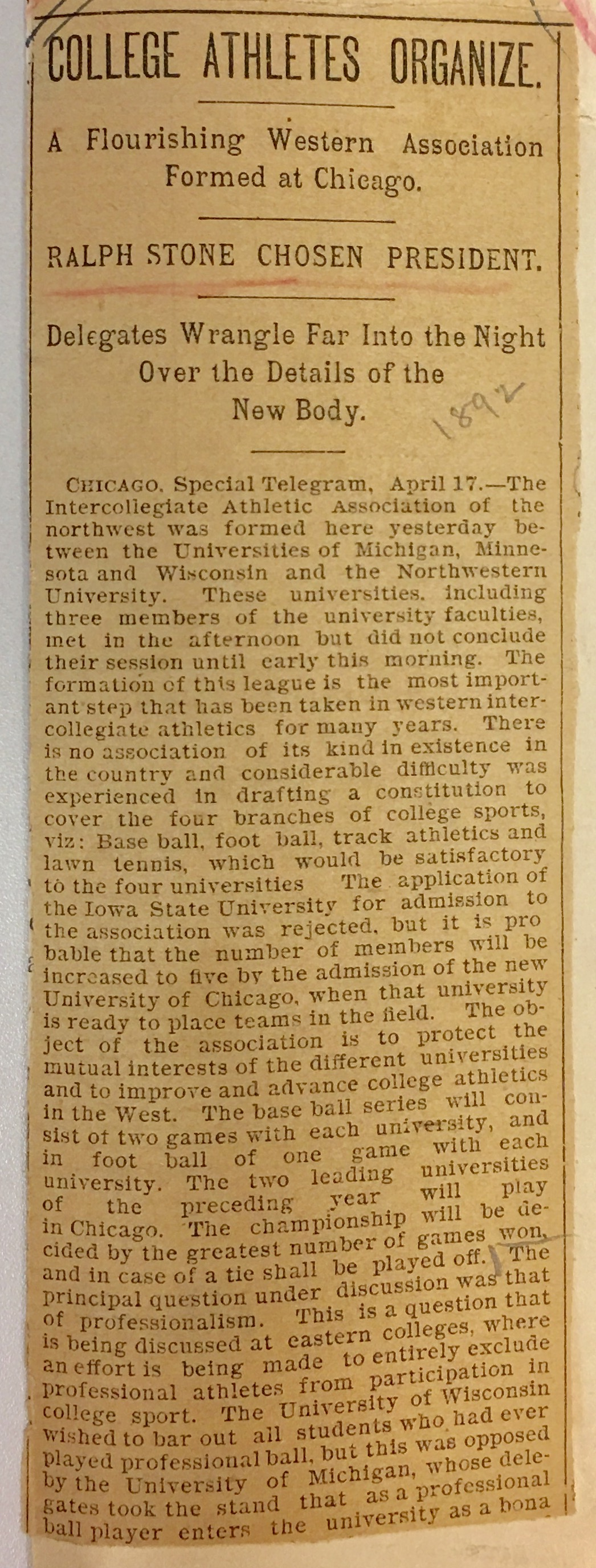
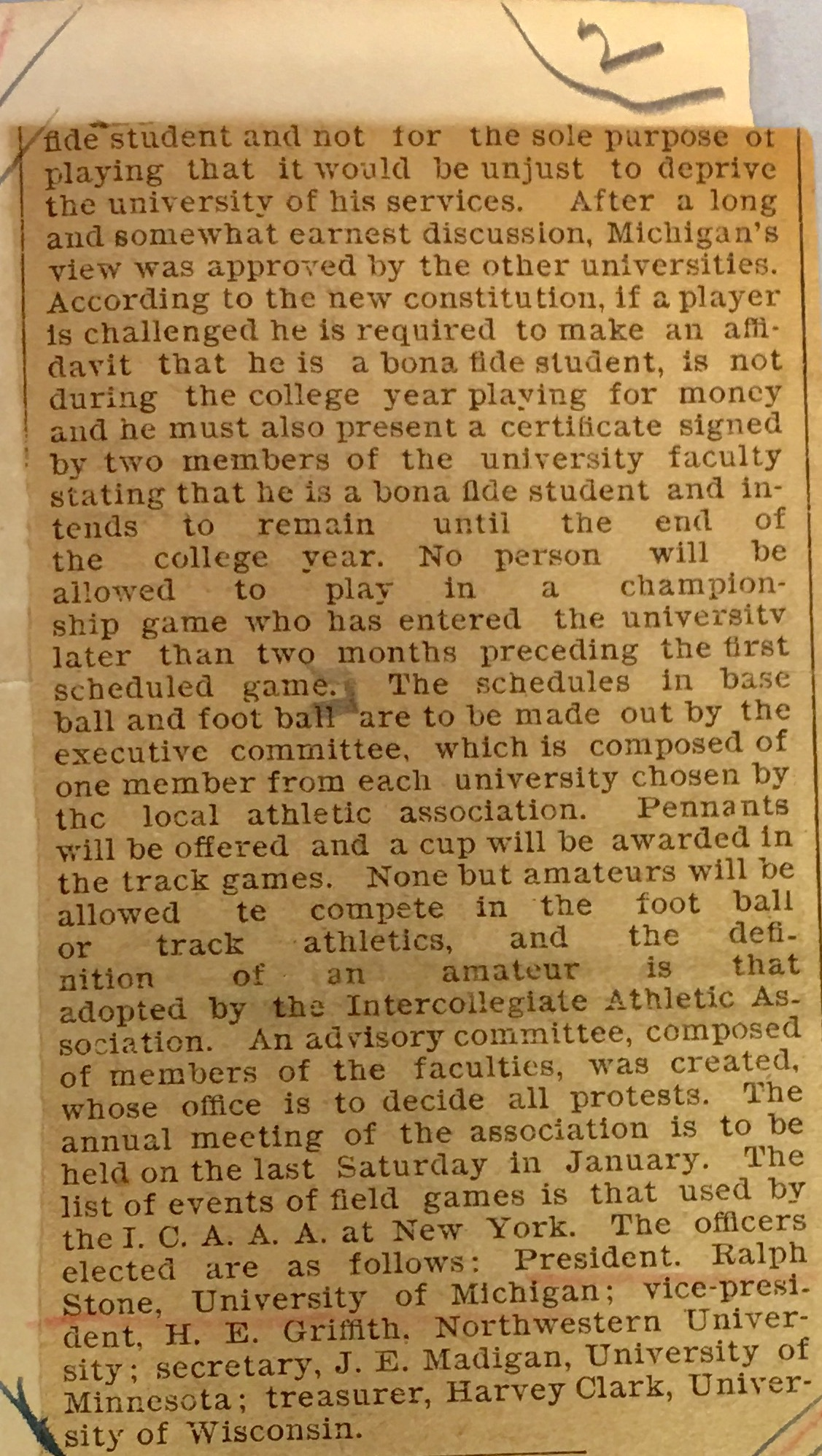

The Intercollegiate Athletic Association of the Northwest (IAAN) was formed in April 1892 at a meeting in Chicago among representatives the Universities of Michigan, Minnesota, Northwestern and Wisconsin. An application by Iowa State University to join the IAAN was rejected, though tentative plans were made to include the newly organized University of Chicago when it was ready to field athletic teams. The IAAN's jurisdiction covered football, baseball, track athletics, and lawn tennis. The impetus for the IAAN came from Ralph Stone, a student delegate from Michigan who was appointed as the organization's first president.

== 1892 football season ==
The Intercollegiate Athletic Association of the Northwest's inaugural season of competition kicked off on October 15 with a 10-6 Michigan win at Wisconsin. Michigan then traveled to Minnesota for a game two days later. Michigan was a heavy favorite to win, but Minnesota dominated the game. The final score was 14–6, with Michigan's points being scored just before the end of the game.

October 29 saw Northwestern beat Michigan in a close game by a score of 10–8. The same day, Minnesota traveled to Wisconsin and won their game 32–4. However, the game was a close 8–4 at halftime before Minnesota pulled away in the second half.

Northwestern went to Minneapolis on November 8 to play a game for conference supremacy. Both teams were undefeated in conference play - a Minnesota win would clinch the conference title and a Northwestern win would put them in a dominating position, needing to win only one of its last two games to win the conference. The game was a hard-fought contest, and was tied, 6–6, at halftime. In the second half, Minnesota's defense stopped Northwestern on downs only six yards from the end zone and then immediately drove down the field to take the lead. Northwestern scored almost immediately on a series of runs, but Minnesota managed another score to retake the lead. Northwestern drove down the field but was stopped at Minnesota's ten-yard line, ending the game. Minnesota's 16–12 win sealed the first Intercollegiate Athletic Association of the Northwest conference championship.

=== Standings ===
1892 Intercollegiate Athletic Association of the Northwest football standings
	Conf.					Overall
Team	W		L		T	W		L		T
Minnesota $	3	–	0	–	0	5	–	0	–	0
Wisconsin	2	–	2	–	0	4	–	3	–	0
Michigan	1	–	2	–	0	7	–	5	–	0
Northwestern	1	–	3	–	0	6	–	4	–	2
$ – Conference champion

== 1893 football season ==
The conference's second (and final) season of football kicked off on October 28 with a Minnesota visit to Michigan. Minnesota won the game, 34–20, and then moved on to Evanston to play Northwestern two days later; they won that game, 16–0. Wisconsin traveled to Ann Arbor and beat Michigan, 34–18, on November 4.

These events set up a situation similar to the previous year: Minnesota and Wisconsin were both undefeated in conference play and met on November 11 to decide the conference title. The game was expected to be a close one, and the game started out that way with no points being scored until Minnesota crossed the goal line twenty minutes into the game. Minnesota scored one more time before halftime giving them a comfortable, if not secure, lead. The second half, however, was completely one-sided. When Minnesota scored with five minutes left to take a 40–0 lead, Wisconsin requested that the game be called and Minnesota agreed. With that win, Minnesota had clinched its second consecutive Intercollegiate Athletic Association of the Northwest title.

Financially, the 1893 season was a disaster for the league—low revenues received by visiting teams being the primary cause. A meeting was held in Chicago and the teams all agreed to disband the league.

=== Standings ===
1893 Intercollegiate Athletic Association of the Northwest football standings
	Conf.					Overall
Team	W		L		T	W		L		T
Minnesota $	3	–	0	–	0	6	–	0	–	0
Wisconsin	1	–	1	–	0	4	–	2	–	0
Michigan	1	–	2	–	0	7	–	3	–	0
Northwestern	0	–	2	–	0	2	–	5	–	3
$ – Conference champion
