= George Jewett =

American football player (1870–1908)

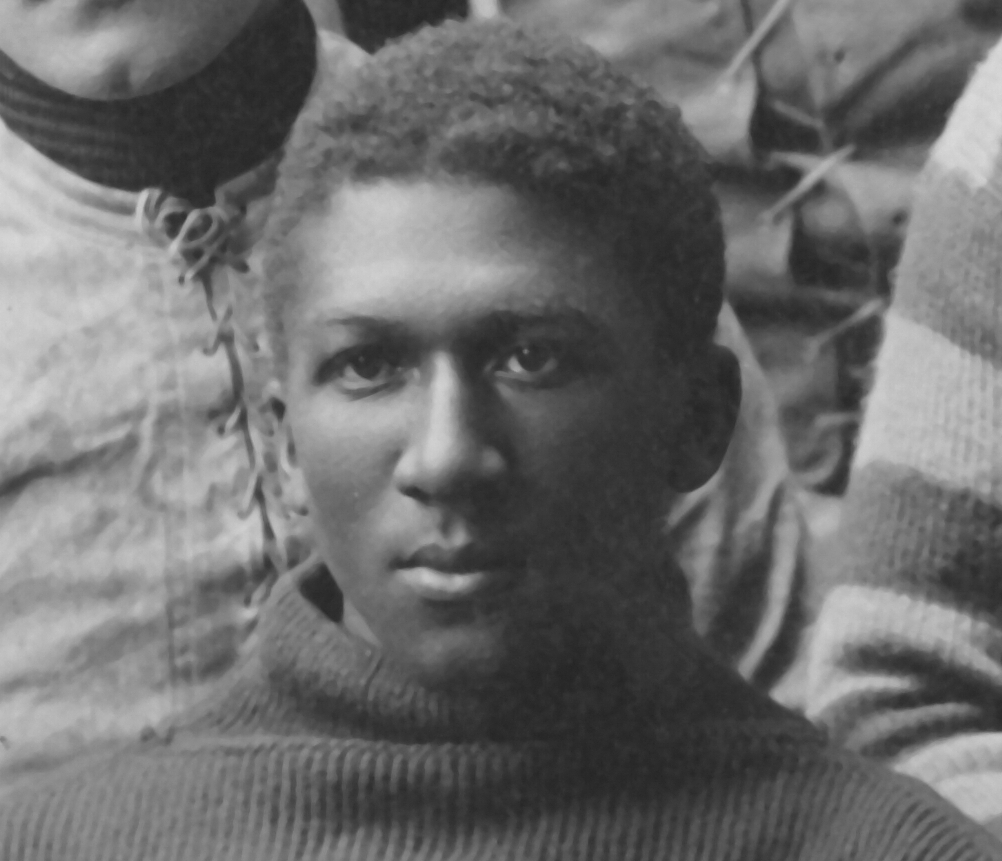
Jewett cropped from 1890 Michigan team photograph

George Henry Jewett II (April 1870 – August 12, 1908) was an American athlete who became the first African-American football player at both the University of Michigan and Northwestern University and in the Big Ten Conference. He played for the Michigan Wolverines as a fullback, halfback, and field goal kicker in 1890 and 1892 and was considered one of Michigan's greatest players in the pre-Fielding H. Yost era.

== Early years ==
Jewett grew up in Ann Arbor, Michigan, the son of a successful blacksmith. At the time of the 1870 United States census, he was listed as being one month old. His father was George Jewett, a blacksmith born in Kentucky in approximately 1845, and his mother was Letty Jewett, born in Michigan to parents from Missouri in approximately 1848. He had an older sister, Mary, born in approximately 1868. The family was residing in Ann Arbor at the time of both the 1870 and 1880 censuses.

Jewett attended Ann Arbor High School where he was the class valedictorian in 1889. In high school, he was the captain of the debate, football and baseball teams. He was also the fastest sprinter in the Midwest, having won the Amateur Athletic Union 100-yard dash competition, and was fluent in German, Italian and French.

== College football ==
=== University of Michigan ===
George Jewett, 1892

Jewett attended the University of Michigan from 1890 to 1893, where he became the first African American in the school's history to letter in football. In 1890, Jewett was the starting fullback for the Michigan team that went 4–1 and outscored opponents 129–36. In 1892, Jewett was the starting halfback on a Michigan team that beat Amos Alonzo Stagg's University of Chicago team, went 7–5 and scored 298 points. At Michigan, he was the leading rusher, scorer and kicker. Jewett was regarded as "one of the greatest stars" in Michigan football in the pre-Fielding H. Yost era. In addition to playing as fullback and halfback, Jewett was also the team's field goal kicker and has been called "the Afro-American phenomenon of the University of Michigan." Oberlin College coach John Heisman described Jewett as a "superior athlete," and University of Chicago coach Amos Alonzo Stagg referred to him as "a very tough opponent."

=== Oberlin College game against John Heisman ===
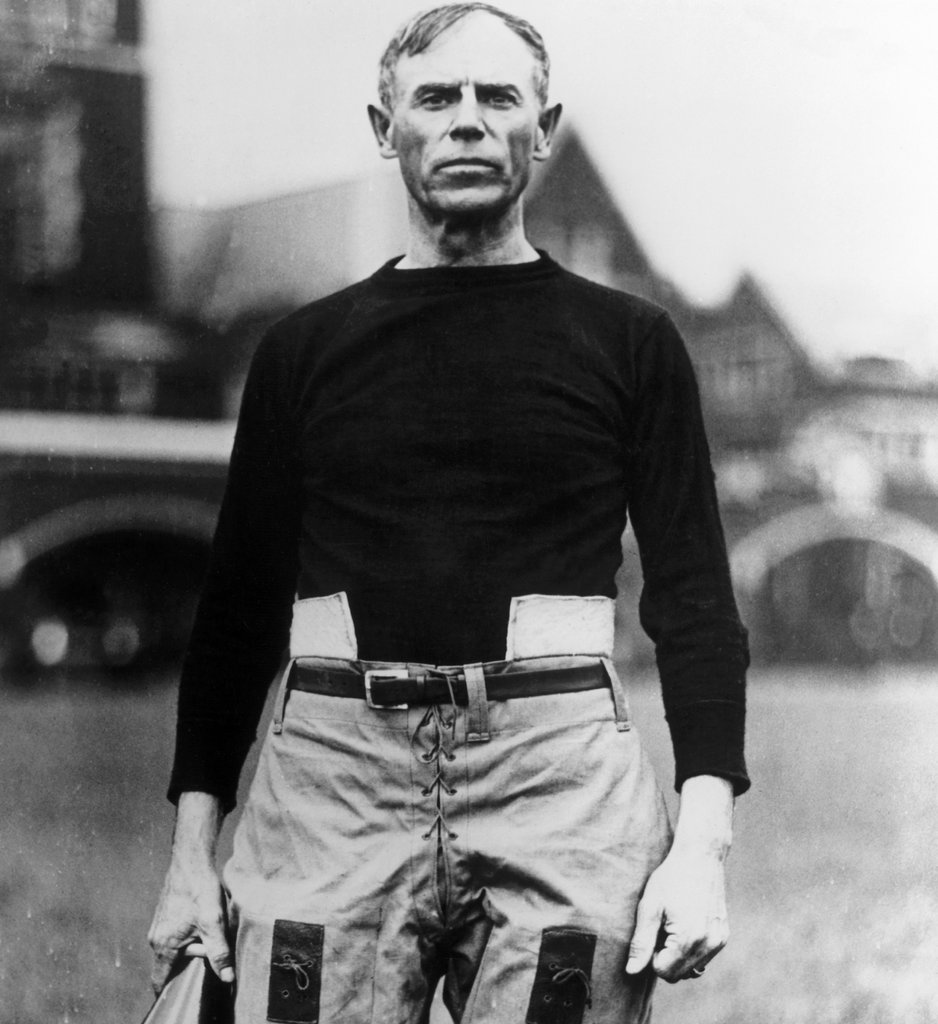
John Heisman

In 1892, Jewett played a central role in a memorable game against an Oberlin College team coached by John Heisman. Michigan met Oberlin at Ann Arbor in November 1892. Jewett scored four touchdowns in the game, including an unopposed 45-yard touchdown run after Oberlin thought time had been called. After Oberlin went ahead, 12–6, Jewett scored his second touchdown on a run from 25 yards out, but his kick failed, so the Wolverines trailed 12–10. Oberlin scored again to make it 18–10. A few minutes later, Jewett ran to "within a foot of the goal line," and the umpire (a former Michigan player) ruled that Jewett had scored a touchdown. Jewett completed the kick after touchdown and the score was 18–16. Jewett also made a touchdown-saving tackle in the Oberlin game, catching up with Charles Savage from behind at the five yard line after a 90-yard run. After Oberlin scored to go ahead 24–22, the referee (an Oberlin player acting as referee in the second half) announced that time had run out and called the game. The umpire (a Michigan man) ruled that four minutes remained on the game clock owing to timeouts that Oberlin's timekeeper had not recorded. As the Oberlin team left the field claiming victory, Michigan lined up, snapped the ball, and Jewett walked the ball across the goal line for Michigan's fifth touchdown. The next day, the Michigan Daily reported: "Oberlin compromised herself by leaving the field before time was up.... Referee Ensworth, an Oberlin substitute, lost all tab of time, and called the game at 14 minutes to 5, while the captain of each team had agreed to play until 10 minutes of that hour." Both schools still record the game as a victory.

=== Northwestern University ===
George Jewett in 1890 Michigan team photograph

Jewett studied medicine at Michigan, but reportedly left abruptly after a run-in with the dean of medicine. He transferred to Northwestern University in 1893 where he received his medical degree and also became the first African American to play for the Northwestern Wildcats football team.

Jewett was not only the first African-American football player at both Michigan and Northwestern, he was also the first African-American athlete to letter in football for any of the schools that formed the Big Ten Conference. After breaking the barrier at Michigan in 1890, Jewett was followed in the Big Ten programs by Fred Patterson at Ohio State University, Preston Eagleson at Indiana University, and then Jewett again at Northwestern. Jewett missed being the first African American in college football by one year. In 1889, William Henry Lewis and William Tecumseh Sherman Jackson played for Amherst.

Eight years before Jewett's debut for the Michigan football team, Moses Fleetwood Walker became the first African American to letter for Michigan, doing so on the baseball team.

== Later years and family ==
Jewett went on to practice medicine in the Chicago area. Jewett returned to Ann Arbor in 1899. At the time of the 1900 census, he was living in Ann Arbor with his parent. He listed his occupation at that time as janitor, while his sister Mary was a music teacher, and his father continued to be employed as a blacksmith.

Jewett later opened a business in Ann Arbor called The Valet, referred to in some sources as a dry cleaning shop and in others as a cleaning and pressing shop. Jewett's shop was located on State Street, between the Congregational Church and Newberry Hall; Jewett delivered finished work by horse and carriage.

Jewett was married on November 4, 1901, to Lillian Zebbs. They had two children, George H. Jewett (1902–1977) and Richard Jewett (born 1908).

Jewett died unexpectedly of a heart attack in 1908 at the age of 38, leaving his wife, Lillian, and two sons; his son Richard was eight days old when his father died. Richard was the father of Coleman Jewett, well known Ann Arbor athlete, educator and craftsman, and grandfather of Michael Jewett, the host of 89.1 Jazz heard on weekday afternoons on WEMU radio.

Jewett is buried at Forest Hill Cemetery in Ann Arbor. He was inducted into the Pioneer High School Hall of Fame in March 2004.

== Legacy ==
Since 2021, the winner of the Michigan–Northwestern rivalry game receives the George Jewett Trophy, the first FBS rivalry trophy named after an African-American player.
