= List of Illinois Fighting Illini football seasons =

This is a list of seasons completed by the Illinois Fighting Illini football program since the team's conception in 1890. The list documents season-by-season records, and conference records from 1890 to the present.

== Seasons ==
Year	Coach	Overall	Conference	Standing	Bowl/playoffs	Coaches^{#}	AP^{°}
Scott Williams (Independent) (1890)
1890	Scott Williams	1–2					
Robert Lackey (Independent) (1891)
1891	Robert Lackey	5–1					
E.K. Hall (Independent) (1892–1893)
1892	E.K. Hall	7–4–1					
1893	E.K. Hall	3–2–3					
Louis Vail (Independent) (1894)
1894	Louis Vail	4–3					
George Huff (Independent) (1895)
1895	George Huff	4–2–1					
George Huff (Western) (1896–1899)
1896	George Huff	4–2–1	0–2–1	T–6th			
1897	George Huff	6–2	1–1	4th			
1898	George Huff	4–5	1–1	4th			
1899	George Huff	3–5–1	0–3	T–6th			
Fred L. Smith (Western) (1900)
1900	Fred L. Smith	7–3–2	1–3–2	8th			
Edgar Holt (Western) (1901–1902)
1901	Edgar Holt	8–2	4–2	4th			
1902	Edgar Holt	10–2–1	4–2	4th			
George W. Woodruff (Western) (1903)
1903	George W. Woodruff	8–6	1–5	7th			
Arthur R. Hall, Justa Lindgren, Fred Lowenthal, & Clyde Matthews (Western) (1904)
1904	Hall, Lindgren, Lowenthal, & Matthews	9–2–1	3–1–1	4th			
Fred Lowenthal (Western) (1905)
1905	Fred Lowenthal	5–4	0–3	T–6th			
Justa Lindgren (Western) (1906)
1906	Justa Lindgren	1–3–1	1–3	5th			
Arthur R. Hall (Western) (1907–1912)
1907	Arthur R. Hall	3–2	3–2	3rd			
1908	Arthur R. Hall	5–1–1	4–1	2nd			
1909	Arthur R. Hall	5–2	3–1	3rd			
1910	Arthur R. Hall	7–0	4–0	1st			
1911	Arthur R. Hall	4–2–1	2–2–1	T–4th			
1912	Arthur R. Hall	3–3–1	1–3–1	T–6th			
Robert Zuppke (Western) (1913–1941)
1913	Robert Zuppke	4–2–1	2–2–1	5th			
1914	Robert Zuppke	7–0	6–0	1st			
1915	Robert Zuppke	5–0–2	3–0–2	5th			
1916	Robert Zuppke	3–3–1	2–2–1	T–4th			
1917	Robert Zuppke	5–2–1	2–2–1	T–5th			
1918	Robert Zuppke	5–2	4–0	1st			
1919	Robert Zuppke	6–1	6–1	1st			
1920	Robert Zuppke	5–2	4–2	4th			
1921	Robert Zuppke	3–4	1–4	8th			
1922	Robert Zuppke	2–5	2–4	6th			
1923	Robert Zuppke	8–0	5–0	1st			
1924	Robert Zuppke	6–1–1	3–1–1	T–2nd			
1925	Robert Zuppke	5–3	2–2	T–4th			
1926	Robert Zuppke	6–2	2–2	T–6th			
1927	Robert Zuppke	7–0–1	5–0	T–1st			
1928	Robert Zuppke	7–1	4–1	1st			
1929	Robert Zuppke	6–1–1	3–1–1	2nd			
1930	Robert Zuppke	3–5	1–4	8th			
1931	Robert Zuppke	2–6	0–6	T–9th			
1932	Robert Zuppke	5–4	2–4	7th			
1933	Robert Zuppke	5–3	3–2	5th			
1934	Robert Zuppke	7–1	4–1	3rd			
1935	Robert Zuppke	3–5	1–4	T–9th			
1936	Robert Zuppke	4–3–1	2–2–1	6th			
1937	Robert Zuppke	3–3–2	2–3	8th			
1938	Robert Zuppke	3–5	2–3	7th			
1939	Robert Zuppke	3–4–1	3–3	6th			
1940	Robert Zuppke	1–7	0–5	9th			
1941	Robert Zuppke	2–6	0–5	9th			
Ray Eliot (Western) (1942–1952)
1942	Ray Eliot	6–4	3–2	T–3rd			
1943	Ray Eliot	3–7	2–4	6th			
1944	Ray Eliot	5–4–1	3–3	6th			15
1945	Ray Eliot	2–6–1	1–4–1	7th			
1946	Ray Eliot	8–2	6–1	1st	W Rose		5
1947	Ray Eliot	5–3–1	3–3	T–3rd			
1948	Ray Eliot	3–6	2–5	8th			
1949	Ray Eliot	3–4–2	3–3–1	T–5th			
1950	Ray Eliot	7–2	4–2	4th		11	13
1951	Ray Eliot	9–0–1	5–0–1	1st	W Rose	3	4
1952	Ray Eliot	4–5	2–5	T–6th			
Ray Eliot (Big Ten) (1953–1959)
1953	Ray Eliot	7–1–1	5–1	T–1st		7	7
1954	Ray Eliot	1–8	0–6	10th			
1955	Ray Eliot	5–3–1	3–3–1	5th			
1956	Ray Eliot	2–5–2	1–4–2	T–7th			
1957	Ray Eliot	4–5	3–4	7th			
1958	Ray Eliot	4–5	4–3	6th			
1959	Ray Eliot	5–3–1	4–2–1	T–3rd		12	13
Pete Elliott (Big Ten) (1960–1966)
1960	Pete Elliott	5–4	3–4	T–5th			
1961	Pete Elliott	0–9	0–7	T–9th			
1962	Pete Elliott	2–7	2–5	8th		18	
1963	Pete Elliott	8–1–1	5–1–1	1st	W Rose	4	3
1964	Pete Elliott	6–3	4–3	T–4th		16	
1965	Pete Elliott	6–4	4–3	5th			
1966	Pete Elliott	4–6	4–3	T–3rd			
Jim Valek (Big Ten) (1967–1970)
1967	Jim Valek	4–6	3–4	T–5th			
1968	Jim Valek	1–9	1–6	T–8th			
1969	Jim Valek	0–10	0–7	10th			
1970	Jim Valek	3–7	1–6	T–9th			
Bob Blackman (Big Ten) (1971–1976)
1971	Bob Blackman	5–6	5–3	T–3rd			
1972	Bob Blackman	3–8	3–5	T–6th			
1973	Bob Blackman	5–6	4–4	T–4th			
1974	Bob Blackman	6–4–1	4–3–1	5th			
1975	Bob Blackman	5–6	4–4	T–3rd			
1976	Bob Blackman	5–6	4–4	T–3rd			
Gary Moeller (Big Ten) (1977–1979)
1977	Gary Moeller	3–8	2–6	T–8th			
1978	Gary Moeller	1–8–2	0–6–2	9th			
1979	Gary Moeller	2–8–1	1–6–1	9th			
Mike White (Big Ten) (1980–1987)
1980	Mike White	3–7–1	3–5	T–6th			
1981	Mike White	7–4	6–3	T–3rd			
1982	Mike White	7–5	6–3	4th	L Liberty		
1983	Mike White	10–2	9–0	1st	L Rose	10	10
1984	Mike White	7–4	6–3	T–2nd			
1985	Mike White	6–5–1	5–2–1	3rd	L Peach		
1986	Mike White	4–7	3–5	T–6th			
1987	Mike White	3–7–1	2–5–1	8th			
John Mackovic (Big Ten) (1988–1991)
1988	John Mackovic	6–5–1	5–2–1	T–3rd	L All-American		
1989	John Mackovic	10–2	7–1	2nd	W Citrus	10	10
1990	John Mackovic	8–4	6–2	T–1st	L Hall of Fame	24	25
1991	John Mackovic (Note: The Fighting Illini were led by fourth-year head coach John Mackovic during the regular season before he resigned and was replaced by Lou Tepper as interim head coach for the team's bowl game.)	6–6	4–4	4th	L John Hancock		
Lou Tepper (Big Ten) (1992–1996)
1992	Lou Tepper	6–5–1	4–3–1	4th	L Holiday		
1993	Lou Tepper	5–6	5–3	T–4th			
1994	Lou Tepper	7–5	4–4	T–5th	W Liberty		
1995	Lou Tepper	5–5–1	3–4–1	T–7th			
1996	Lou Tepper	2–9	1–7	T–9th			
Ron Turner (Big Ten) (1997–2004)
1997	Ron Turner	0–11	0–8	11th			
1998	Ron Turner	3–8	2–6	7th			
1999	Ron Turner	8–4	4–4	T–6th	W MicronPC	25	24
2000	Ron Turner	5–6	2–6	T–9th			
2001	Ron Turner	10–2	7–1	1st	L Sugar^{†}	12	12
2002	Ron Turner	5–7	4–4	T–5th			
2003	Ron Turner	1–11	0–8	11th			
2004	Ron Turner	3–8	1–7	11th			
Ron Zook (Big Ten) (2005–2011)
2005	Ron Zook	2–9	0–8	11th			
2006	Ron Zook	2–10	1–7	T–10th			
2007	Ron Zook	9–4	6–2	T–2nd	L Rose^{†}	18	20
2008	Ron Zook	5–7	3–5	T–8th			
2009	Ron Zook	3–9	2–6	9th			
2010	Ron Zook	7–6	4–4	T–4th	W Texas		
2011	Ron Zook (Note: Zook was fired after the team lost the final six games of its regular season. Defensive coordinator Vic Koenning was appointed as interim head coach led the team in the Kraft Fight Hunger Bowl.)	7–6	2–6	5th (Leaders)	W Kraft Fight Hunger		
Tim Beckman (Big Ten) (2012–2014)
2012	Tim Beckman	2–10	0–8	6th (Leaders)			
2013	Tim Beckman	4–8	1–7	5th (Leaders)			
2014	Tim Beckman	6–7	3–5	T–5th (West)	L Heart of Dallas		
Bill Cubit (Big Ten) (2015)
2015	Bill Cubit	5–7	2–6	T–5th (West)			
Lovie Smith (Big Ten) (2016–2020)
2016	Lovie Smith	3–9	2–7	6th (West)			
2017	Lovie Smith	2–10	0–9	7th (West)			
2018	Lovie Smith	4–8	2–7	7th (West)			
2019	Lovie Smith	6–7	4–5	4th (West)	L Redbox		
2020	Lovie Smith (Note: Prior to the team's final game, Smith was relieved of his coaching duties and replaced by offensive coordinator Rod Smith on an interim basis.)	2–6	2–6	7th (West)			
Bret Bielema (Big Ten) (2021–present)
2021	Bret Bielema	5–7	4–5	5th (West)			
2022	Bret Bielema	8–5	5–4	T–2nd (West)	L ReliaQuest		
2023	Bret Bielema	5–7	3–6	T–4th (West)			
2024	Bret Bielema	10–3	6–3	T–5th	W Citrus	16	16
2025	Bret Bielema	9–4	5–4	T–7th	W Music City	25	
Total:		646–625–50					
National championship Conference title Conference division title or championship game berth
^{†}Indicates Bowl Coalition, Bowl Alliance, BCS, or CFP / New Years' Six bowl.; ^{#}Rankings from final Coaches Poll.
