= List of Illinois Fighting Illini head football coaches =

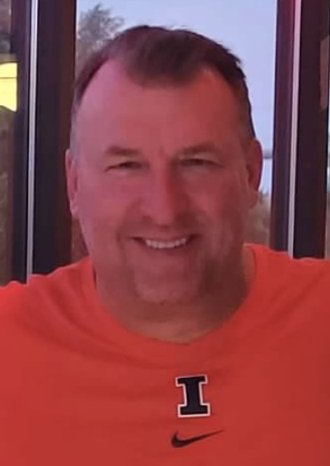
Bret Bielema is the current head coach at Illinois

The Illinois Fighting Illini college football team represents the University of Illinois Urbana-Champaign in the Big Ten Conference (Big 10). The Fighting Illini compete as part of the National Collegiate Athletic Association (NCAA) Division I Football Bowl Subdivision. The program has had 27 head coaches, and two interim head coaches, since it began play during the 1890 season. Since December 2020, Bret Bielema has served as head coach at Illinois.

Eleven coaches have led Illinois in postseason bowl games: Ray Eliot, Pete Elliott, Mike White, John Mackovic, Lou Tepper, Ron Turner, Ron Zook, Vic Koenning, Tim Beckman, Lovie Smith, and Bielema. Seven of coaches also won conference championships: Arthur R. Hall, Robert Zuppke, Eliot, Elliott, White, Mackovic, and Turner a member of the Big 10. Zuppke won four and Eliot one national championships as head coach of the Fighting Illini.

Zuppke is the leader in seasons coached, with 29 years as head coach, games coached with 224, and games won with 131. Robert Lackey has the highest winning percentage of those who have coached more than one game at 0.833. Jim Valek has the lowest winning percentage of those who have coached more than one game, with 0.200. Of the 27 different head coaches who have led Illinois, Edward K. Hall, George Washington Woodruff, Zuppke, Elliott, and Bob Blackman have been inducted into the College Football Hall of Fame.

== Key ==
Key to symbols in coaches list
General		Overall		Conference		Postseason (Note: Although the first Rose Bowl Game was played in 1902, it has been continuously played since the 1916 game, and is recognized as the oldest bowl game by the NCAA. "—" indicates any season prior to 1916 when postseason games were not played.)	
No.	Order of coaches (Note: A running total of the number of head coaches, with coaches who served separate tenures being counted only once. Interim head coaches are represented with "Int" and are not counted in the running total. "—" indicates the team played but either without a coach or no coach is on record. "X" indicates an interim year without play.)	GC	Games coached	CW	Conference wins	PW	Postseason wins
DC	Division championships	OW	Overall wins	CL	Conference losses	PL	Postseason losses
CC	Conference championships	OL	Overall losses	CT	Conference ties	PT	Postseason ties
NC	National championships	OT	Overall ties (Note: Overtime rules in college football were introduced in 1996, making ties impossible in the period since.)	C%	Conference winning percentage		
†	Elected to the College Football Hall of Fame	O%	Overall winning percentage (Note: When computing the win–loss percentage, a tie counts as half a win and half a loss.)				

== Coaches ==
List of head football coaches showing season(s) coached, overall records, conference records, postseason records, championships and selected awards (Note: Statistics correct as of the end of the 2025 NCAA Division I FBS football season.)
No.	Name	Term	GC	OW	OL	OT	O%	CW	CL	CT	C%	PW	PL	PT	DC (Note: Divisional champions have advanced to the Big Ten Football Championship Game since the institution of divisional play beginning in the 2011 season. Since that time, Illinois has competed as a member of the West Division.)	CC	NC	Awards
1	Scott Williams	1890	3	1	2	0	0.333	—	—	—	—	—	—	—	—	—	0	—
2	Robert Lackey	1891	6	5	1	0	0.833	—	—	—	—	—	—	—	—	—	0	—
3	Edward K. Hall^{†}	1892–1893	22	12	6	4	0.636	—	—	—	—	—	—	—	—	—	0	—
4	Louis Vail	1894	8	4	4	0	0.500	—	—	—	—	—	—	—	—	—	0	—
5	George Huff	1895–1899	40	21	16	3	0.563	2	7	1	0.250	—	—	—	—	0	0	—
6	Fred L. Smith	1900	12	7	3	2	0.667	1	3	2	0.333	—	—	—	—	0	0	—
7	Edgar Holt	1901–1902	23	18	4	1	0.804	8	4	0	0.667	—	—	—	—	0	0	—
8	George Washington Woodruff^{†}	1903	14	8	6	1	0.571	1	5	0	0.167	—	—	—	—	0	0	—
9	Clyde Mathews (Note: Mathews shared the title of "head coach" with Hall, Lindgren, and Lowenthal for the 1904 season.)	1904	12	9	2	1	0.792	3	1	1	0.700	—	—	—	—	0	0	—
10	Fred Lowenthal (Note: Lowenthal shared the title of "head coach" with Hall, Lindgren, and Mathews for the 1904 season.)	1904–1905	21	14	6	1	0.690	3	4	1	0.438	—	—	—	—	0	0	—
11	Justa Lindgren (Note: Lindgren shared the title of "head coach" with Hall, Lowenthal, and Mathews for the 1904 season.)	1904, 1906	17	10	5	2	0.647	4	4	1	0.500	—	—	—	—	0	0	—
12	Arthur R. Hall (Note: Hall shared the title of "head coach" with Lindgren, Lowenthal, and Mathews for the 1904 season.)	1904, 1907–1912	52	36	12	4	0.731	20	10	3	0.652	—	—	—	—	1	0	—
13	Robert Zuppke^{†}	1913–1941	224	131	81	12	0.612	76	66	8	0.533	—	—	—	—	7	4 – 1914, 1919, 1923, 1927	—
14	Ray Eliot	1942–1959	167	83	73	11	0.530	54	55	7	0.496	2	0	0	—	3	1 – 1951	—
15	Pete Elliott^{†}	1960–1966	66	31	34	1	0.477	22	26	1	0.459	1	0	0	—	1	0	—
16	Jim Valek	1967–1970	40	8	32	0	0.200	5	23	0	0.179	0	0	0	—	0	0	—
17	Bob Blackman^{†}	1971–1976	66	29	36	1	0.447	24	23	1	0.510	0	0	0	—	0	0	—
18	Gary Moeller	1977–1979	33	6	24	3	0.227	3	18	3	0.188	0	0	0	—	0	0	—
19	Mike White	1980–1987	91	47	41	3	0.533	40	26	2	0.603	0	3	0	—	1	0	—
20	John Mackovic	1988–1991	47	30	16	1	0.649	22	9	1	0.703	1	2	0	—	1	0	—
21	Lou Tepper	1991–1996	58	25	31	2	0.448	17	21	2	0.450	1	2	0	—	0	0	—
22	Ron Turner	1997–2004	92	35	57	—	0.380	20	44	—	0.313	1	1	—	—	1	0	—
23	Ron Zook	2005–2011	85	34	51	—	0.400	18	38	—	0.321	1	1	—	0	0	0	—
Int.	Vic Koenning	2011	1	1	0	—	1.000	0	0	—	–	1	0	—	0	0	0	—
24	Tim Beckman	2012–2014	37	12	25	—	0.324	4	20	—	0.167	1	0	—	0	0	0	—
25	Bill Cubit	2015	12	5	7	—	0.417	2	6	—	0.250	0	0	—	0	0	0	—
26	Lovie Smith	2016–2020	56	17	39	—	0.304	10	33	—	0.233	0	1	—	0	0	0	—
Int.	Rod Smith	2020	1	0	1	—	.000	0	1	—	.000	0	0	—	0	0	0	—
27	Bret Bielema	2021–present	63	37	26	—	0.587	23	22	—	0.511	2	1	—	0	0	0	—
