= 1892 Chicago Maroons football team =

American college football season

1892 Chicago Maroons football
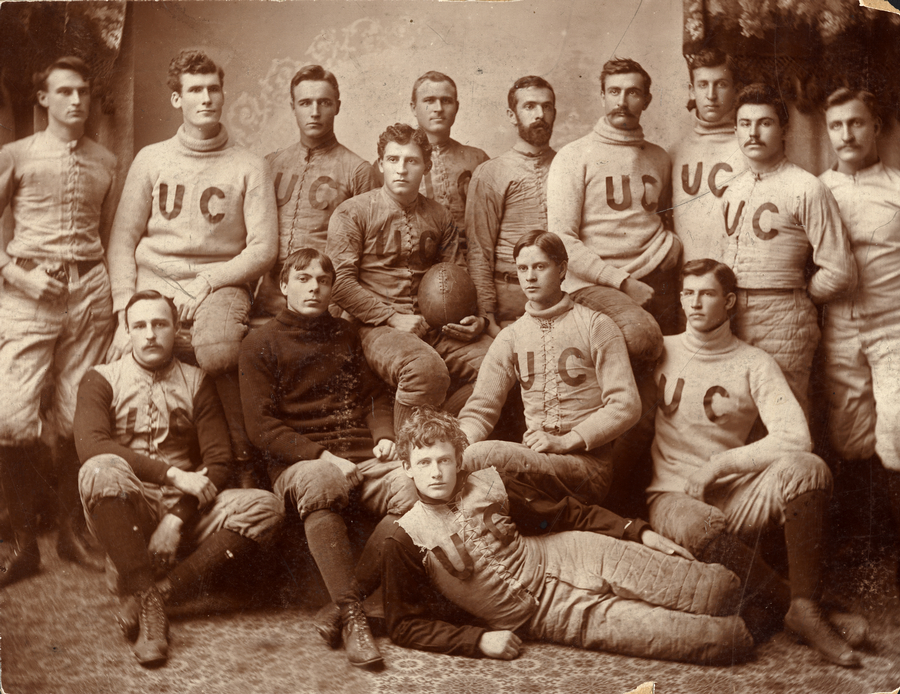
- The first team fielded by the University of Chicago
- Conference: Independent
- Record: 8–4–1
- Head coach: Amos Alonzo Stagg (1st season)
- Base defense: 7–2–2

1892 Midwestern college football independents records
	Conf.			Overall
Team	W	L	T	W		L		T
Oberlin		–		7	–	0	–	0
Case		–		3	–	0	–	0
Iowa Agricultural		–		1	–	0	–	1
Notre Dame		–		1	–	0	–	1
Chicago		–		8	–	4	–	1
Michigan State Normal		–		2	–	1	–	0
Illinois		–		7	–	4	–	1
Ohio State		–		5	–	3	–	0
Washington University		–		3	–	2	–	0
Hillsdale		–		3	–	2	–	1
Doane		–		1	–	1	–	0
Heidelberg		–		1	–	1	–	0
Miami (OH)		–		2	–	2	–	0
Buchtel		–		3	–	4	–	0
Lake Forest		–		2	–	3	–	0
Cincinnati		–		1	–	2	–	0
Marquette		–		1	–	2	–	0
Ohio Wesleyan		–		1	–	3	–	0
Wittenberg		–		0	–	2	–	1
St. Ignatius College		–		0	–	1	–	0
Washburn		–		0	–	2	–	0
Kalamazoo		–		0	–	2	–	0

The 1892 Chicago Maroons football team represented the University of Chicago during the 1892 college football season. Former Yale All-American, Amos Alonzo Stagg, was the team's head coach and also played (at age 30) at the end position. On October 8, 1892, one week into the university's first semester, the football team played its first game, defeating Hyde Park High School, 14–0. The team won its first six games in eleven days, playing matches against local high schools and the Englewood YMCA. Starting on October 22, the team played seven intercollegiate games, compiling a 2–4–1 record in those games. The two victories against college teams were games with Lake Forest and Illinois.

The team featured three older players. Stagg, at age 30, had previously played college football at Yale; Andy Wyant, at age 25, had played for Bucknell dating back to 1887; and Joseph Raycroft, at age 24, was Stagg's assistant athletic director and also played quarterback. Stagg and Wyant were both later inducted into the College Football Hall of Fame.

== Schedule ==
Date	Time	Opponent	Site	Result	Attendance	Source
October 8	4:30 p.m.	Hyde Park High School	Washington Park; Chicago, IL	W 14–0		
October 10		Englewood High School	Washington Park; Chicago, IL	W 12–8	1,000	
October 11		Hyde Park High School	Chicago, IL	W 16–10		
October 12		Englewood YMCA	Chicago, IL	W 18–4		
October 17		Hyde Park High School	Chicago, IL	W 26–0		
October 19		Englewood YMCA	Chicago, IL	W 18–12		
October 22	3:30 p.m.	Northwestern	South Side Ball Park; Chicago, IL	T 0–0	300	
November 2		at Northwestern	Evanston, IL	L 4–6		
November 5		Lake Forest	South Side grounds; Chicago, IL	W 18–16		
November 12		vs. Michigan	Olympic Park; Toledo, OH (rivalry)	L 10–18		
November 16		Illinois	Chicago, IL	W 10–4		
November 19		at Purdue	Stuart Field; West Lafayette, IN (rivalry)	L 0–38		
November 24		at Illinois	Champaign, IL	L 12–28		

== Season summary ==
=== Preseason ===
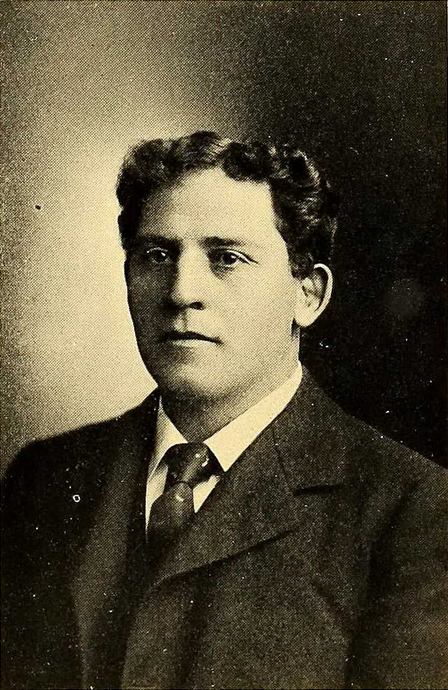
Amos Stagg served as both, player and coach

By April 1892, Amos Alonzo Stagg, a 30-year-old who had graduated from Yale University in 1888, had been hired to serve as an instructor and the head of the department of physical culture at the University of Chicago upon its opening in October 1892.

On October 1, 1892, the University of Chicago opened its doors for its first semester. At 2:30 p.m. that day, at the university chapel, Prof. Stagg from the department of physical culture called to order a meeting of 600 incoming students for the purpose of adopting a "college yell". After an hour of experimenting with yells, Stagg selected a number of students to form the university's first football team. Stagg took the chosen students to Washington Park for preliminary football practice. Stagg later recalled that he began with "about a dozen" inexperienced players. Because of the lack of student participation during the 1892 season, Stagg decided to participate as a player. He later recalled: "I had to do one-half the playing. Our boys are so very green."

=== Game 1: Hyde Park High School ===
On Saturday, October 8, 1892, Chicago played its first football game, defeating the team from Hyde Park High School by a 14–0 score at Washington Park. The game was played in two 15-minute periods in a drizzling rain at Washington Park. The Chicago Tribune described the play as "brisk and sharp", featuring good runs by Stagg, Dyas, and Knapp. The lineup for Chicago consisted of Rapp, Stagg, Dyas, Hanson, Chase, Wyant, Smith, Loeb, Olson, Knapp, and Lamay.

=== Game 2: Englewood High School ===
On Monday, October 10, 1892, Chicago played its second football game, defeating the team from Englewood High School by a 12–8 score. Nearly 1,000 spectators watch the game at Washington Park. In its account of the game, the Chicago Daily Tribune credited Knapp (a former Wisconsin football player), Wyant, Olson, Chase and Stagg for their "splendid work".

=== Game 7: Northwestern ===
On October 22, 1892, Chicago played its first intercollegiate football game, playing a scoreless tie with Northwestern. The game was played starting at 3:30 p.m. before 300 students at the South Side Ball Park. In the second half, Stagg had a long run for a touchdown, but the referee ruled that "the ball had not touched the third man," and the touchdown did not count. Chicago's lineup in the game was Rulkoetter (center), Smith (left guard), Knapp (right guard), Brenneman (left tackle), Wyant (right tackle), Allen (left end), Chase (right end), Raycrof (quarterback), McGillorey (left halfback), Stagg (right halfback), and Rapp (fullback).

=== Game 8: at Northwestern ===
On November 2, 1892, Chicago sustained its first loss, falling to Northwestern by a 6 to 4 score in a game played at Evanston, Illinois. The game began at 3:50 p.m. and was played in the rain. In the first half, Kennicott scored a touchdown on a long run and then kicked for the goal after touchdown to give Northwestern a 6 to 0 lead. In the second half, Chicago scored a touchdown, but Stagg's kick for the goal after touchdown was wide to the left.

=== Game 9: Lake Forest ===
On November 5, 1892, Chicago secured its first victory in an intercollegiate football game, defeating the team from Lake Forest College by an 18–16 score. The game began at 3:30 p.m. and was played at the South Side grounds. The Chicago Daily Tribune reported that Chicago's captain, Stagg, "played a game of strategy like the wizard he is." Chicago's second touchdown was scored on a trick play. The ball was passed to Stagg who ran to the left and then passed to a teammate running in the opposite direction who ran through a clear field for a touchdown. The Chicago Daily Tribune called it "one of those surprising plays that causes the onlooker to wonder why it was not done oftener."

=== Game 10: vs. Michigan ===
On November 13, 1892, Chicago played Michigan in the first chapter of what became the Chicago–Michigan football rivalry. The game was played on a wet and muddy field in front of a crowd estimated by various accounts at between 700 and 1,500 spectators at Toledo's Olympic Park. For Stagg, the game presented an opportunity to play the best football team in the West, and for the University of Chicago's president William Rainey Harper, it was "an opportunity to advertise the university in northern Ohio." Michigan won the inaugural match by a score of 18 to 10. Amos Alonzo Stagg was both the coach and starting right halfback for the 1892 Chicago Maroons. Chicago's full starting lineup was Conover (left end), Brenneman (left tackle), Smith (left guard), Rulkoelter (center), Knapp (right guard), Allen (right tackle), Chase (right end), Raycroft (quarterback), McGillivray (left halfback), Stagg (right halfback), Rapp (fullback).

=== Game 11: Illinois ===
On Wednesday, November 16, 1892, Chicago defeated Illinois by a 10–4 score in Chicago. Each team scored a touchdown but missed the goal after touchdown, and the first half ended in a 4–4 tie. In the second half, Stagg ran around the left end for a touchdown and kicked the goal after touchdown to give Chicago its 10–4 advantage. Illinois protested the legitimacy of Chicago's second touchdown and contended the game had rightfully ended in a tie. Chicago's lineup was Allen (left end), Brunerman (left tackle), Knapp (left guard), Rulkoetter (center), Smith (right guard), Wyant (right tackle), Chase (right end), Raycroft (quarterback), McGillivray (left halfback), Stagg (right halfback), and Rapp (fullback).

=== Game 12: at Purdue ===
On November 19, 1892, Chicago lost to Purdue by a 38–0 in a game played on Stuart Fieldl in West Lafayette, Indiana. Left tackle Finney scored five touchdowns for Purdue. Chicago's starting lineup against Purdue was Conover (left end), Brenman (left tackle), Knapp (left guard), Ruelkoepper (center), Smith (right guard), Allen (right tackle), Chase (right end), Raycroft (quarterback), Stagg (right halfback), McGillivray (left halfback), and Rapp (fullback).

=== Game 13: at Illinois ===
On November 24, 1892, Chicago played in its first Thanksgiving Day game, losing to Illinois by a 28–12 score in Champaign, Illinois. Stagg was unable to play in the game due to injury. Chicago's lineup against Illinois was O'Conner (left end), Breman (left tackle), Smith (left guard), Pullkaetter (center), Knapp (right guard), Wyant (right tackle), Chase (right end), Raycroft (quarterback), McGillivrey (halfback), Allen (halfback), Rapp (fullback).

== Players ==
Right tackle Andy Wyant, later inducted into the College Football Hall of Fame

- Charles William Allen - right tackle, left end, halfback
- Richard E. Brendeman - left tackle
- Henry Thurston Chase - right end
- W. B. Conover - left end
- John V. Fradenburg
- Henry Gordon Gale
- George Knapp - right guard
- John Lemay
- Clifford B. McGillivray - left halfback
- William John Rapp - fullback
- Joseph Raycroft - quarterback
- W. Ruhlkoetter - center
- William Rufus Smith - guard
- Amos Alonzo Stagg - right halfback (College Football Hall of Fame)
- Andy Wyant - right tackle; a football player at Bucknell before playing for Stagg at Chicago (College Football Hall of Fame)
