= 1892 Doane Tigers football team =

American college football season

1892 Doane Tigers football
- Conference: Independent
- Record: 1–1
- Head coach: F. P. Reed (1st season)

1892 Midwestern college football independents records
	Conf.			Overall
Team	W	L	T	W		L		T
Oberlin		–		7	–	0	–	0
Case		–		3	–	0	–	0
Iowa Agricultural		–		1	–	0	–	1
Notre Dame		–		1	–	0	–	1
Chicago		–		8	–	4	–	1
Michigan State Normal		–		2	–	1	–	0
Illinois		–		7	–	4	–	1
Ohio State		–		5	–	3	–	0
Washington University		–		3	–	2	–	0
Hillsdale		–		3	–	2	–	1
Doane		–		1	–	1	–	0
Heidelberg		–		1	–	1	–	0
Miami (OH)		–		2	–	2	–	0
Buchtel		–		3	–	4	–	0
Lake Forest		–		2	–	3	–	0
Cincinnati		–		1	–	2	–	0
Marquette		–		1	–	2	–	0
Ohio Wesleyan		–		1	–	3	–	0
Wittenberg		–		0	–	2	–	1
St. Ignatius College		–		0	–	1	–	0
Washburn		–		0	–	2	–	0
Kalamazoo		–		0	–	2	–	0

The 1892 Doane Tigers football team represented Doane College in the 1892 college football season. Led by F. P. Reed in his only year as head coach, the Doane compiling a record of 1–1.

== Schedule ==
Date	Opponent	Site	Result	Source
October 22	vs. Illinois	Omaha, NE	L 0–20	
October 29	Cotner	Doane College grounds; Crete, NE	W 62–0	
