= Milton W. Mathews =

American politician

Col. Milton W. Mathews
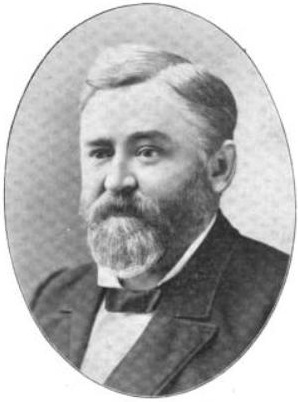

Member of the Illinois Senate from the 30th district
- In office 1888 – 1892
- Preceded by: Martin B. Thompson
- Succeeded by: Henry M. Dunlap

Personal details
- Born: March 1, 1846 Clark County, Illinois, U.S.
- Died: May 10, 1892 (aged 46) Urbana, Illinois, U.S.
- Party: Republican
- Profession: Attorney

Milton W. Mathews (March 1, 1846 – May 10, 1892) was an American attorney, publisher, and politician. Born and raised in Illinois, he practiced law in Champaign County before he was elected state's attorney. Mathews was also an important figure in the Modern Woodmen of America, serving as their chairman of the board of directors, and owned the Champaign County Herald. He was elected to the first of two terms in the Illinois Senate in 1888. During the second term he was named pro tempore President of the Illinois Senate, though he died before the term was complete.

== Biography ==
Milton W. Mathews was born on March 1, 1846, in Clark County, Illinois. He received a mix of public and private education as a child. In 1865, he came to Champaign County to teach at Yankee Ridge School in Urbana. Mathews studied law in his free time, then studied under George W. Gere. He was admitted to the bar in 1867 and joined his mentor's firm as a partner. Mathews was named a master in chancery in 1873, serving for nine years.

Mathews took an interest in politics and became affiliated with the Republican Party. He was nominated by the party for state's attorney in 1876 and was elected. He served two four-years terms in the office. In 1888, he was nominated and elected to the Illinois Senate. He served two two-year terms. Mathews was named pro tempore President of the Illinois Senate during his second term. Governor Joseph W. Fifer appointed Mathews a Colonel. In 1879, Mathews purchased the Champaign County Herald. He was successful in managing the paper and, in recognition, was twice named the president of the Illinois State Editorial Association. The association named him their representative to the National Editorial Association.

Mathews married Julia R. Foote on October 21, 1869. They had two children, Loueva Mae and Clyde Milton. Mathews was a member of the Modern Woodmen of America. Through his efforts to unite the group during a particularly difficult time, he was named its chairman of the board of directors. Mathews died on May 10, 1892, from a heart attack before his second senate term was completed. Funerary services were held at the Military Drill Hall in Urbana.

Mathews died on May 10, 1892, at his home in Urbana.
