= 1892 Oberlin Yeomen football team =

American college football season

1892 Oberlin Yeomen football
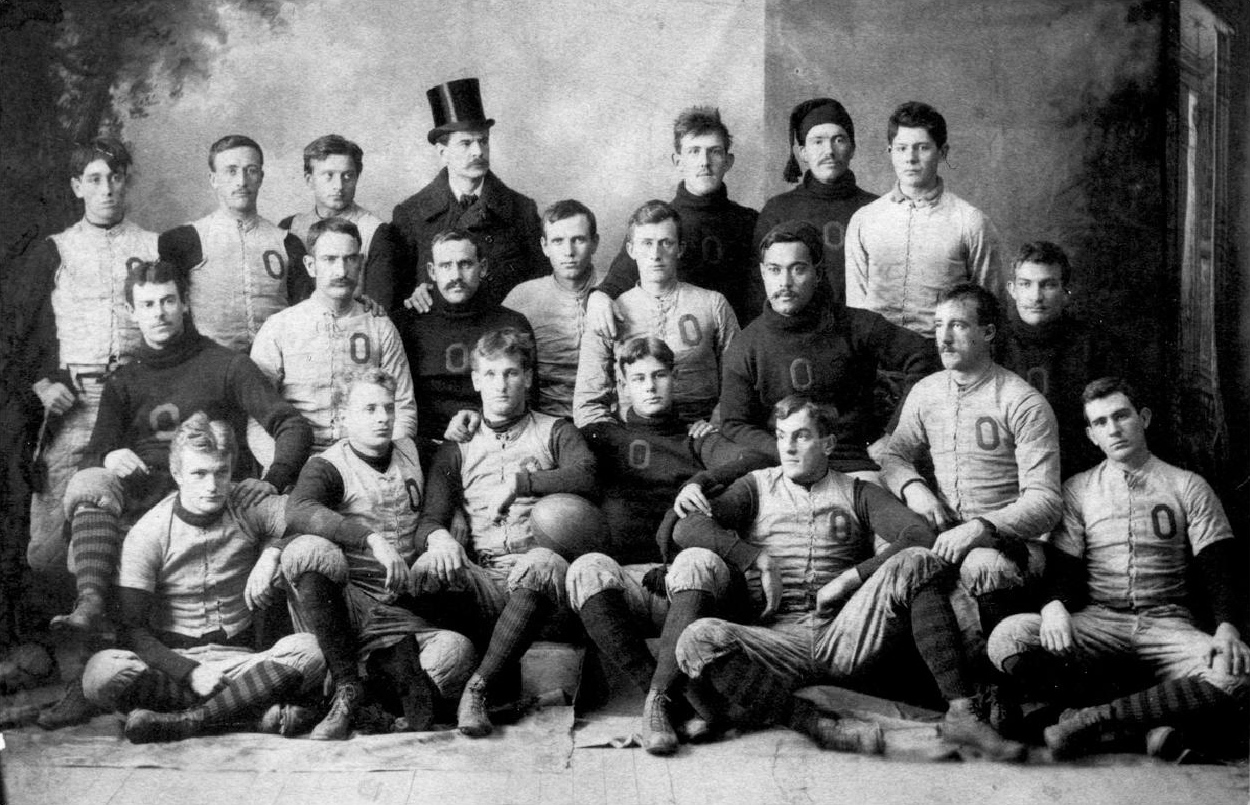
- Conference: Independent
- Record: 7–0
- Head coach: John Heisman (1st season)

1892 Midwestern college football independents records
	Conf.			Overall
Team	W	L	T	W		L		T
Oberlin		–		7	–	0	–	0
Case		–		3	–	0	–	0
Iowa Agricultural		–		1	–	0	–	1
Notre Dame		–		1	–	0	–	1
Chicago		–		8	–	4	–	1
Michigan State Normal		–		2	–	1	–	0
Illinois		–		7	–	4	–	1
Ohio State		–		5	–	3	–	0
Washington University		–		3	–	2	–	0
Hillsdale		–		3	–	2	–	1
Doane		–		1	–	1	–	0
Heidelberg		–		1	–	1	–	0
Miami (OH)		–		2	–	2	–	0
Buchtel		–		3	–	4	–	0
Lake Forest		–		2	–	3	–	0
Cincinnati		–		1	–	2	–	0
Marquette		–		1	–	2	–	0
Ohio Wesleyan		–		1	–	3	–	0
Wittenberg		–		0	–	2	–	1
St. Ignatius College		–		0	–	1	–	0
Washburn		–		0	–	2	–	0
Kalamazoo		–		0	–	2	–	0

The 1892 Oberlin Yeomen football team represented Oberlin College during the 1892 college football season. In its first season under head coach John Heisman, the team compiled a perfect 7–0 record, shut out five opponents, and outscored all opponents, 262 to 20. The season included a disputed victory over Michigan (Note: Michigan records the game as a 26–24 victory in its favor.) and a pair of victories over Ohio State. The 1892 and 1893 teams combined for a 13-game winning streak that was broken on November 18, 1893, in a loss to the Case School of Applied Science.

== Schedule ==
Date	Opponent	Site	Result	Source
October 15	Ohio State	Oberlin, OH	W 40–0	
October 21	Adelbert	Oberlin, OH	W 38–8	
November 5	at Ohio Wesleyan	Delaware, OH	W 56–0	
November 7	Ohio State	Recreation Park; Columbus, OH	W 50–0	
November 12	Kenyon		W 38–0	
November 17	at Adelbert	Cleveland, OH	W 16–0	
November 19	at Michigan	Regents Field; Ann Arbor, MI	W 24–22	

== Game summaries ==
=== Ohio State (October 15) ===
The season opened with a 40–0 win over Ohio State. Samuel P. Bush was an assistant coach for the Buckeyes.

=== Ohio State (November 7) ===
Oberlin played Ohio State again and won 50–0. In the second half, the ball was in Oberlin territory most of the time.

=== Michigan ===
On November 19, Oberlin played a close game against Michigan. The outcome of the game was, and remains, disputed. Michigan records the game as a 26–24 victory, while Oberlin does not count the final Michigan touchdown and records the game as a 24–22 victory for Oberlin.

George Jewett scored Michigan's first touchdown on 45-yard run around the right end. He also kicked goal, and Michigan led, 6–0. Carl Williams then scored for Oberlin, and Hart kicked goal to tie the score. Savage scored Oberlin's second touchdown, and Hart again kicked goal to put Oberlin ahead, 12–6. Michigan scored three additional touchdowns in the first half, two by Jewett and one by W. W. Griffin. Jewett converted two out of the three kicks for goal from touchdown. Oberlin also scored another touchdown and kicked goal. At halftime, Michigan led, 22–18.

The second half consisted of only three short drives before the game ended in controversy. Michigan began the half with possession and fumbled. On Oberlin's first possession of the second half, Savage took the ball at Oberlin's two-yard line and ran 103 yards to Michigan's five-yard line where Jewett caught up and tackled him. Two plays later, Hart scored a touchdown and Oberlin kicked goal to take a 24–22 lead. On the next possession after Hart's touchdown, Michigan ran two plays when the referee Ensworth, a substitute player for Oberlin, called time and the entire Oberlin team "ran off the field so quickly it almost seemed prearranged." A Harvard man in the audience approached Oberlin's manager Hogen to say that "Oberlin would be everlastingly disgraced among reputable Rugby teams if she persisted," but the Oberlin team refused to play out the game, boarded its bus, and left for its hotel. Michigan refused to accept the ruling and, with the support of the umpire (Horace Greely Prettyman of Michigan), handed the ball to Jewett who walked for Michigan's claimed fifth touchdown.

The U. of M. Daily opined that Oberlin had played a strong game but had "neutralized the good impression" by "leaving the field several minutes before time was up." In another account, the Daily detailed the clock controversy as follows: "Referee Ensworth, an Oberlin substitute, lost all tab of time, and called the game at fourteen minutes to five, while the captain of each team had agreed to play until ten minutes before the hour. Time-keeper Spangler also verifies this. Captain Williams immediately got his team into the bus and were driven to their hotel. All expostulations with the Oberlin captain and manager were of no avail. Umpire Prettyman had the time and says that Mr. Ensworth did not take out a four minutes wait during the latter part of the half when one of the players was recovering from an injury."

Adding to the intrigue, the Chicago Tribune reported that Michigan's left tackle "Doc" Pearson had earlier been ejected from the game and in turn slugged the referee—the Oberlin man who later called the game over.

The Detroit newspapers reported that Michigan had won the game, while Oberlin newspapers reported that Oberlin had won. More than a century later, the controversy continued as the Oberlin Alumni Magazine published an article about "The Day Oberlin Beat Michigan".

== Postseason ==
Wrote The Oberlin Review in 1892: "Mr. Heisman has entirely remade our football. He has taught us scientific football."

== Personnel ==
Oberlin's team trainer, "nurse to the wounded," was pre-med student Clarence Hemingway, who would go on to practice medicine in Oak Park, Illinois, and pass on his love of hunting in Michigan to his son, future novelist Ernest Hemingway.
