= 2014 Illinois Fighting Illini football team =

American college football season

2014 Illinois Fighting Illini football

Heart of Dallas Bowl vs. Louisiana Tech, L 18–35
- Conference: Big Ten Conference
- West Division
- Record: 6–7 (3–5 Big Ten)
- Head coach: Tim Beckman (3rd season)
- Offensive coordinator: Bill Cubit (2nd season)
- Offensive scheme: Spread
- Defensive coordinator: Tim Banks (3rd season)
- Base defense: 4–3
- Home stadium: Memorial Stadium

2014 Big Ten Conference football standings
	Conf.			Overall
Team	W		L	W		L
East Division
No. 1 Ohio State x$#^	8	–	0	14	–	1
No. T–5 Michigan State	7	–	1	11	–	2
Maryland	4	–	4	7	–	6
Rutgers	3	–	5	8	–	5
Michigan	3	–	5	5	–	7
Penn State	2	–	6	7	–	6
Indiana	1	–	7	4	–	8
West Division
No. 13 Wisconsin x	7	–	1	11	–	3
Minnesota	5	–	3	8	–	5
Nebraska	5	–	3	9	–	4
Iowa	4	–	4	7	–	6
Illinois	3	–	5	6	–	7
Northwestern	3	–	5	5	–	7
Purdue	1	–	7	3	–	9
Championship: Ohio State 59, Wisconsin 0
# – College Football Playoff champion; ^ – College Football Playoff participant; $ – Conference champion; x – Division champion/co-champions; Rankings from AP Poll

The 2014 Illinois Fighting Illini football team was an American football team that represented the University of Illinois Urbana-Champaign as a member of the Big Ten Conference during the 2014 NCAA Division I FBS football season. In their third and final season under head coach Tim Beckman, the Fighting Illini compiled a 6–7 record (3–5 in conference games), tied for fifth place out of six teams in the Big Ten's West Division, and were outscored by a total of 442 to 337. They concluded the season with a loss to Louisiana Tech in the Heart of Dallas Bowl.

The team's statistical leaders included quarterback Wes Lunt (1,763 passing yards), running back Josh Ferguson (735 rushing yards, 60 points scored), and wide receiver Mike Dudek (76 receptions for 1,038 yards).

The team played its home games at Memorial Stadium in Champaign, Illinois.

== Schedule ==
Date	Time	Opponent	Site	TV	Result	Attendance
August 30	11:00 am	No. 24 (FCS) Youngstown State*	Memorial Stadium; Champaign, IL	BTN	W 28–17	36,234
September 6	11:00 am	Western Kentucky*	Memorial Stadium; Champaign, IL	BTN	W 42–34	38,561
September 13	3:00 pm	at Washington*	Husky Stadium; Seattle, WA	FOX	L 19–44	62,325
September 20	3:00 pm	Texas State*	Memorial Stadium; Champaign, IL	ESPNews	W 42–35	41,019
September 27	8:00 pm	at No. 21 Nebraska	Memorial Stadium; Lincoln, NE	BTN	L 14–45	91,255
October 4	11:00 am	Purdue	Memorial Stadium; Champaign, IL (rivalry)	ESPN2	L 27–38	45,046
October 11	11:00 am	at Wisconsin	Camp Randall Stadium; Madison, WI	ESPN2	L 28–38	80,341
October 25	11:00 am	Minnesota^{†}	Memorial Stadium; Champaign, IL	ESPNU	W 28–24	44,437
November 1	7:00 pm	at No. 13 Ohio State	Ohio Stadium; Columbus, OH (Illibuck Trophy)	ABC	L 14–55	106,961
November 15	11:00 am	Iowa	Memorial Stadium; Champaign, IL	BTN	L 14–30	50,373
November 22	11:00 am	Penn State	Memorial Stadium; Champaign, IL	ESPN2	W 16–14	35,172
November 29	11:00 am	at Northwestern	Ryan Field; Evanston, IL (rivalry)	ESPNU	W 47–33	31,137
December 26	12:00 pm	vs. Louisiana Tech*	Cotton Bowl; Dallas, TX (Heart of Dallas Bowl)	ESPN	L 18–35	31,297
*Non-conference game; ^{†}Homecoming; Rankings from AP Poll released prior to the game; All times are in Central time

== Personnel ==
=== Coaching staff ===
Name	Position	Consecutive season at Illinois	Alma Mater
Tim Beckman	Head coach	2	Findlay (1988)
Bill Cubit	Offensive coordinator/quarterbacks	1	Delaware (1974)
Mike Bellamy	Wide receivers	2	Illinois (1990)
Tom Brattan	Offensive Line	0	Delaware (1972)
Alex Golesh	Tight ends/Running backs/Fullbacks/recruiting coordinator	2	Ohio State (2006)
Tim Banks	Defensive coordinator/secondary	2	Central Michigan (1995)
Greg Colby	Defensive line	1	Illinois (1974)
Al Seamonson	Outside Linebackers	1	Wisconsin (1982)
Mike Ward	Inside Linebackers	2	Georgetown College (1984)
Tim Salem	Special Teams Coordinator	2	Arizona State (1985)

=== Roster ===
2014 Illinois Fighting Illini football team roster
Players
Coaches
Offense

Pos.	#	Name	Class
WR	2	Tyrin Stone-Davis	So
TE	3	Jon Davis	Sr
QB	4	Reilly O'Toole	Sr
RB	5	Donovonn Young	Jr
RB	6	Josh Ferguson	So
QB	7	Chayce Crouch	Fr
WR	8	Geronimo Allison	Jr
WR	9	Martize Barr	Sr
TE	11	Matt LaCosse	Sr
QB	12	Wes Lunt	So
WR	13	Dionte Taylor	So
QB	15	Aaron Bailey	So
WR	16	Marchie Murdock	Fr
QB	16	Man Berg	Fr
WR	18	Mike Dudek	Fr
WR	19	Justin Hardee	Jr
RB	23	Devin Church	So
RB	25	Kendrick Foster	Fr
RB	26	Cameron Tucker	Jr
RB	29	T. J. Moss	Fr
TE	30	Jim Nudera	Jr
WR	31	Leslie Poole	Jr
TE	47	Tim Clary	Jr
OL	52	Alex Hill	Sr
OL	53	Nick Allegretti	Fr
OL	55	Chris Boles	Jr
OL	57	Austin Schmidt	So
OL	60	Tony Durkin	Jr
OL	64	Steve Dumezich	Fr
OL	66	Scott McDowell	Jr
OL	67	Christian DiLauro	Fr
OL	68	Simon Cvijanovic	Sr
OL	69	Ted Karras	Jr
OL	70	Peter Cvijanovic	Fr
OL	71	Joe Spencer	So
OL	73	Chris O'Connor	Jr
OL	74	Michael Heitz	Sr
OL	75	Pat Flavin	Jr
OL	76	Jesse Chadwell	Fr
OL	78	Harry Black	So
WR	80	Jeremey Whitlow	Jr
WR	81	Raphael Barr	So
WR	82	Kameron Fry	So
TE	83	Trevor Kanteman	Fr
WR	84	Kenny Knight	Jr
WR	86	Malik Turner	Fr
TE	87	Tyler White	So
WR	88	Zach Grant	Jr
TE	89	Dallas Hinkhouse	Jr

Defense

Pos.	#	Name	Class
DB	2	V'Angelo Bentley	Jr
DB	3	Taylor Barton	So
DB	4	Darwyn Kelly	Fr
STAR	5	James Crawford	Fr
LB	6	Carroll Phillips	So
DB	7	Caleb Day	So
DB	8	Dillan Cazley	So
STAR	9	Earnest Thomas III	Sr
LB	10	B. J. Bello	So
STAR	14	Eric Finney	Jr
DB	15	Jevaris Little	So
DL	17	Jihad Ward	Jr
DB	20	Clayton Fejedelem	Jr
DB	21	Zane Petty	Sr
LB	22	LaKeith Walls	So
DB	23	Dennis Thurow	Fr
DB	24	Darius Mosely	So
DB	25	Sean Arowolaju	So
DB	26	Cedric Doxy	So
DB	27	Eaton Spencer	Jr
DB	28	Jaylen Dunlap	So
STAR	29	Nelson Lugo	So
DB	30	Julian Hylton	Fr
DB	31	Nick North	Jr
DB	32	Chris James	Fr
STAR	33	Zepheniah Grimes	Jr
LB	34	Mike Svetina	Jr
LB	35	Sean White	So
LB	36	Austin Roberts	Fr
DB	37	Davontay Kwaaning	Jr
DB	38	Samuel Harlib	Fr
LB	39	Nathan Echard	Fr
LB	42	Ralph Cooper	Sr
LB	43	Mason Monheim	Jr
DL	44	Austin Teitsma	Sr
LB	45	Henry McGrew	Fr
STAR	46	Jason Goldsmith	Fr
LEO	48	Tate Gordon	Fr
STAR	49	Conner Schmidt	Fr
LB	52	T. J. Neal	So
LB	55	Tre Watson	Fr
DL	58	Kenny Nelson	Jr
DL	85	Brandon Roberts	Fr
LEO	90	DeJazz Woods	Sr
LEO	91	Dawuane Smoot	So
DL	92	Abe Cajuste	Sr
DL	93	Teko Powell	Jr
DL	94	Tito Odenigbo	Fr
DL/FB	95	Jake Howe	Sr
DL	96	Rob Bain	So
DL	97	Paul James III	Fr
DL	98	Joe Fotu	Jr
DL	99	Jarrod Clements	So

Special teams

Pos.	#	Name	Class
PK/P	13	Ryan Frain	So
PK	17	Taylor Zalewski	Jr
P	18	Justin DuVernois	Sr
PK	38	David Reisner	So
P	40	Ryan Tucker	Fr
P	41	Nick Kybruz	Fr
LS	54	Zach Hirth	So
LS	56	Michael Martin	So
PK	83	Brennen VanMieghem	Sr

Head coach

- Tim Beckman

Coordinators/assistant coaches

- Tim Banks (defensive coordinator / secondary)
- Bill Cubit (offensive coordinator / quarterbacks)
- Mike Bellamy (wide receivers)
- Tom Brattan (offensive line)
- Greg Colby (defensive line)
- Alex Golesh (tight ends / specialist / recruiting coordinator)
- Tim Salem (running backs / special teams coordinator)
- Al Seamonson (outside linebackers)
- Mike Ward (inside linebackers)
- Robert Arnheim (graduate assistant - offense)
- Kolby Jackson (graduate assistant - defense)
- Tyler Johns (graduate assistant - offense)
- LeDominique Williams (graduate assistant - defense)
- Nina Baloun (assistant recruiting coordinator)
- Trent Chesnut (head football equipment manager)
- Dane Chester (director of football game analysis)
- Ryan Cubit (director of football student-athlete development)
- Aaron Hillmann (head football strength & conditioning coach)
- Tim Knox (director of football operations)
- Jake Naas (head football athletic trainer)
- Eric Streeter (assistant athletic trainer)
- Juice Williams (director of alumni and former player relations)
- Scott Yielding (director of player personnel)

Legend

- (C) Team captain
- (S) Suspended
- (I) Ineligible
- Injured
- Redshirt

Roster
Last update: December 3, 2014

== Game summaries ==
=== Youngstown State ===
Youngstown State Penguins vs Illinois Fighting Illini – Game summary

Quarter	1	2	3	4	Total
Youngstown State	3	3	3	8	17
Illinois	0	7	0	21	28

at Memorial Stadium • Champaign, IL

- Date: August 30, 2014
- Game time: 11:00 a.m. CDT
- Game weather: Temperature: • Wind: • Weather:
- Game attendance:
- Referee: Referee: • Umpire: • Linesman: • Line judge: • Back judge: • Field judge: • Side judge:
- TV announcers (BTN): Chris Denari (Play-by-play) & Danan Hughes (Color)

Game information

First Quarter

Second Quarter

Third Quarter

Fourth Quarter

Top Passers

- YSU –
- ILL –

Top Rushers

- YSU –
- ILL –

Top Receiving

- YSU –
- ILL –

Top Tackler

- YSU –
- ILL –

=== Western Kentucky ===
Western Kentucky Hilltoppers vs Illinois Fighting Illini – Game summary

Quarter	1	2	3	4	Total
Western Kentucky	3	14	10	7	34
Illinois	7	7	7	21	42

at Memorial Stadium • Champaign, IL

- Date: September 6, 2014
- Game time: 11:00 a.m. CDT
- Game weather: Temperature: • Wind: • Weather:
- Game attendance:
- Referee: Referee: • Umpire: • Linesman: • Line judge: • Back judge: • Field judge: • Side judge:
- TV announcers (BTN): Chris Denari (Play-by-play), J Leman (Color) & Rebecca Haarlow (Sideline)

Game information

First Quarter

Second Quarter

Third Quarter

Fourth Quarter

Top Passers

- WKU –
- ILL –

Top Rushers

- WKU –
- ILL –

Top Receiving

- WKU –
- ILL –

Top Tackler

- WKU –
- ILL –

=== Washington ===
	1	2	3	4	Total
Fighting Illini	3	9	7	0	19
Huskies	21	17	0	6	44

=== Texas State ===
	1	2	3	4	Total
Bobcats	14	7	7	7	35
Fighting Illini	6	7	12	17	42

=== Nebraska ===
	1	2	3	4	Total
Fighting Illini	7	7	0	0	14
Cornhuskers	7	24	7	7	45

=== Purdue ===
	1	2	3	4	Total
Boilermakers	7	10	14	7	38
Fighting Illini	14	0	13	0	27

=== Wisconsin ===
	1	2	3	4	Total
Fighting Illini	14	0	0	14	28
Badgers	7	17	7	7	38

=== Minnesota ===
	1	2	3	4	Total
Golden Gophers	0	3	21	0	24
Fighting Illini	14	0	7	7	28

=== Ohio State ===
	1	2	3	4	Total
Fighting Illini	0	0	7	7	14
Buckeyes	17	14	17	7	55

=== Iowa ===
	1	2	3	4	Total
Hawkeyes	2	7	7	14	30
Fighting Illini	7	0	0	7	14

=== Penn State ===
	1	2	3	4	Total
Nittany Lions	7	0	0	7	14
Fighting Illini	0	7	3	6	16

=== Northwestern ===
Team	1	2	3	4	Total
• Illinois	13	13	7	14	47
Northwestern	0	7	10	16	33

- Date: November 29
- Location: Ryan Field, Evanston, IL
- Game start: 11:00 a.m. CST
- TV announcers (ESPNU): Mark Neely (Play-by-play) & Ray Bentley (Color)

Scoring summary
Q1	1:41	ILL	Turner 10 yard pass from O'Toole (Reisner kick)	ILL 7–0
Q1	:56	ILL	Ferguson 1 yard run (kick failed)	ILL 13–0
Q2	12:26	ILL	Reisner 33 yard field goal	ILL 16–0
Q2	5:39	ILL	Zalewski 33 yard field goal	ILL 19–0
Q2	5:24	NW	Vault 89 yard kickoff return (Mitchell kick)	ILL 19–7
Q2	:47	ILL	Dudek 14 yard pass from O'Toole (Zalewski kick)	ILL 26–7
Q3	12:24	NW	Mitchell 34 yard field goal	ILL 26–10
Q3	7:24	ILL	Barr 9 yard pass from O'Toole (Zalewski kick)	ILL 33–10
Q3	3:56	NW	Jackson 5 yard run (Mitchell kick)	ILL 33–17
Q4	14:05	NW	Jackson 35 yard pass from Oliver (Dickerson pass from Oliver)	ILL 33–25
Q4	12:39	ILL	Ferguson 46 yard run (Zalewski kick)	ILL 40–25
Q4	4:58	ILL	Monheim 49 yard interception return (Zalewski kick)	ILL 47–25
Q4	1:28	NW	Green 4 yard pass from Oliver (Jones pass from Oliver)	ILL 47–33

Reilly O'Toole passed for 147 yards and three touchdowns while also rushing for 147 yards.

=== Louisiana Tech–Heart of Dallas Bowl ===
	1	2	3	4	Total
Fighting Illini	3	6	6	3	18
Bulldogs	14	7	0	14	35
