= Frank D. Arms =

American football coach (1872–1913)

Biographical details
- Born: March 11, 1872; Illinois, U.S.
- Died: August 8, 1913 (aged 41); Chicago, Illinois, U.S.
- Education: Illinois (1893)

Playing career
- 1891–1892: Illinois
- Position: Halfback

Coaching career (HC unless noted)
- 1895: Wabash

Head coaching record
- Overall: 6–3

Franklin David Arms (March 11, 1872 – August 8, 1913) was an American football coach. He was the tenth head football coach at Wabash College in Crawfordsville, Indiana, serving for the 1895 season and compiling a record of 6–3.

A native of Chicago, Arms was elected manager of the 1892 Illinois Fighting Illini football team. Arms later worked as an architect, and lived in Sioux City, Iowa. He died on August 8, 1913, in Chicago.

== Head coaching record ==
Year	Team	Overall	Conference	Standing	Bowl/playoffs
Wabash (Independent) (1895)
1895	Wabash	6–3			
Wabash:		6–3			
Total:		6–3			
