= 1892 Marquette Blue and Gold football team =

American college football season

1892 Marquette Blue and Gold football
- Conference: Independent
- Record: 1–2
- Head coach: None

1892 Midwestern college football independents records
	Conf.			Overall
Team	W	L	T	W		L		T
Oberlin		–		7	–	0	–	0
Case		–		3	–	0	–	0
Iowa Agricultural		–		1	–	0	–	1
Notre Dame		–		1	–	0	–	1
Chicago		–		8	–	4	–	1
Michigan State Normal		–		2	–	1	–	0
Illinois		–		7	–	4	–	1
Ohio State		–		5	–	3	–	0
Washington University		–		3	–	2	–	0
Hillsdale		–		3	–	2	–	1
Doane		–		1	–	1	–	0
Heidelberg		–		1	–	1	–	0
Miami (OH)		–		2	–	2	–	0
Buchtel		–		3	–	4	–	0
Lake Forest		–		2	–	3	–	0
Cincinnati		–		1	–	2	–	0
Marquette		–		1	–	2	–	0
Ohio Wesleyan		–		1	–	3	–	0
Wittenberg		–		0	–	2	–	1
St. Ignatius College		–		0	–	1	–	0
Washburn		–		0	–	2	–	0
Kalamazoo		–		0	–	2	–	0

The 1892 Marquette Blue and Gold football team was an American football team that represented Marquette University as an independent during the 1892 college football season. In Marquette's first season of American football, the University compiled a 1–2 record, with two losses against nearby Milwaukee High School and a win over Loyola of Chicago.

== Schedule ==
Date	Opponent	Site	Result
October 22	Milwaukee High School	Milwaukee, WI	L 0–14
November 24	Milwaukee High School	Milwaukee, WI	L 0–16
December 1	Loyola (IL)	Chicago, IL	W 10–0
