= 1892 Iowa Agricultural Cardinals football team =

American college football season

1892 Iowa Agricultural Cardinals football
- Conference: Independent
- Record: 1–0–1
- Head coach: Ira C. Brownlie (1st season)
- Captain: Ira C. Brownlie

1892 Midwestern college football independents records
	Conf.			Overall
Team	W	L	T	W		L		T
Oberlin		–		7	–	0	–	0
Case		–		3	–	0	–	0
Iowa Agricultural		–		1	–	0	–	1
Notre Dame		–		1	–	0	–	1
Chicago		–		8	–	4	–	1
Michigan State Normal		–		2	–	1	–	0
Illinois		–		7	–	4	–	1
Ohio State		–		5	–	3	–	0
Washington University		–		3	–	2	–	0
Hillsdale		–		3	–	2	–	1
Doane		–		1	–	1	–	0
Heidelberg		–		1	–	1	–	0
Miami (OH)		–		2	–	2	–	0
Buchtel		–		3	–	4	–	0
Lake Forest		–		2	–	3	–	0
Cincinnati		–		1	–	2	–	0
Marquette		–		1	–	2	–	0
Ohio Wesleyan		–		1	–	3	–	0
Wittenberg		–		0	–	2	–	1
St. Ignatius College		–		0	–	1	–	0
Washburn		–		0	–	2	–	0
Kalamazoo		–		0	–	2	–	0

The 1892 Iowa Agricultural Cardinals football team represented Iowa Agricultural College (later renamed Iowa State University) as an independent during the 1892 college football season. The 1892 season was the first in which an organized group of athletes represented Iowa State in football. However, the team did not engage in intercollegiate football, playing only two non-collegiate teams and compiling a 1–0–1 record. The team played a town team from State Center to a 6–6 tie and defeated a team representing the Des Moines YMCA by a 30–0 score.

Dr. Ira C. Brownlie was both the head coach, team captain, and played at the end position. Brownlie was credited with having "introduced football" while he was a student at the school in 1892. Brownlie later recalled: "There were so many strong boys around there doing nothing that I thought they could make a football team easily." The only other player known to have played on the 1892 team was Charles Deering.

Between 1892 and 1913, the football team played on a field that later became the site of the university's Parks Library.

== Schedule ==
Date	Opponent	Site	Result
October ?	State Center	State Field; Ames, IA	T 6-6
	Des Moines YMCA	State Field; Ames, IA	W 30-0
