= 1892 Ohio State Buckeyes football team =

American college football season

1892 Ohio State Buckeyes football
- Conference: Independent
- Record: 5–3
- Head coach: Jack Ryder (1st season)
- Captain: Richard T. Ellis
- Home stadium: Recreation Park

1892 Midwestern college football independents records
	Conf.			Overall
Team	W	L	T	W		L		T
Oberlin		–		7	–	0	–	0
Case		–		3	–	0	–	0
Iowa Agricultural		–		1	–	0	–	1
Notre Dame		–		1	–	0	–	1
Chicago		–		8	–	4	–	1
Michigan State Normal		–		2	–	1	–	0
Illinois		–		7	–	4	–	1
Ohio State		–		5	–	3	–	0
Washington University		–		3	–	2	–	0
Hillsdale		–		3	–	2	–	1
Doane		–		1	–	1	–	0
Heidelberg		–		1	–	1	–	0
Miami (OH)		–		2	–	2	–	0
Buchtel		–		3	–	4	–	0
Lake Forest		–		2	–	3	–	0
Cincinnati		–		1	–	2	–	0
Marquette		–		1	–	2	–	0
Ohio Wesleyan		–		1	–	3	–	0
Wittenberg		–		0	–	2	–	1
St. Ignatius College		–		0	–	1	–	0
Washburn		–		0	–	2	–	0
Kalamazoo		–		0	–	2	–	0

The 1892 Ohio State Buckeyes football team represented Ohio State University in the 1892 college football season. They played all their home games at Recreation Park and were coached by Jack Ryder. The Buckeyes finished the season with a 5–3 record.

== Schedule ==
Date	Opponent	Site	Result
October 15	at Oberlin	Oberlin, OH	L 4–40
October 22	at Buchtel	Akron, OH	W 62–0
October 29	Marietta	Recreation Park; Columbus, OH	W 80–0
November 5	at Denison	Granville, OH	W 32–0
November 7	Oberlin	Recreation Park; Columbus, OH	L 0–50
November 12	Dayton YMCA	Recreation Park; Columbus, OH	W 42–4
November 19	at Western Reserve	Cleveland, OH	L 18–40
November 24	Kenyon	Recreation Park; Columbus, OH	W 26–10
