= Ira C. Brownlie =

American football and baseball coach (1873–1956)

Biographical details
- Born: April 11, 1873; Long Grove, Iowa, U.S.
- Died: December 8, 1956 (aged 83); Denver, Colorado, U.S.

Playing career

Football
- 1894: Iowa Agricultural

Coaching career (HC unless noted)

Football
- 1892: Iowa Agricultural

Baseball
- 1898: Iowa Agricultural

Head coaching record
- Overall: 1–0–1 (football); 2–4 (baseball)

Ira Clifton Brownlie (April 11, 1873 – December 8, 1956) was an American college football and college baseball coach. He was the first head football coach at Iowa Agricultural College and Model Farm—now known as Iowa State University—serving for one season in 1892 and compiling a record of 1–0–1. He was also the head baseball coach at Iowa Agricultural in 1898, tallying a mark of 2–4.

Brownlie was born in Long Grove, Iowa and attended high school in Davenport, Iowa. He later moved to Colorado, where he worked as a dentist. He died in Denver, Colorado on December 8, 1956.

== Head coaching record ==
=== Football ===
Year	Team	Overall	Conference	Standing
Iowa Agricultural Cardinals (Independent) (1892)
1892	Iowa Agricultural	1–0–1		
Iowa Agricultural:		1–0–1		
Total:		1–0–1		
