= 1892 Illinois Fighting Illini football team =

American college football season

1892 Illinois Fighting Illini football
- Conference: Independent
- Record: 7–4–1
- Head coach: Edward K. Hall (1st season)
- Captain: Ralph W. Hart
- Home stadium: Illinois Field

1892 Midwestern college football independents records
	Conf.			Overall
Team	W	L	T	W		L		T
Oberlin		–		7	–	0	–	0
Case		–		3	–	0	–	0
Iowa Agricultural		–		1	–	0	–	1
Notre Dame		–		1	–	0	–	1
Chicago		–		8	–	4	–	1
Michigan State Normal		–		2	–	1	–	0
Illinois		–		7	–	4	–	1
Ohio State		–		5	–	3	–	0
Washington University		–		3	–	2	–	0
Hillsdale		–		3	–	2	–	1
Doane		–		1	–	1	–	0
Heidelberg		–		1	–	1	–	0
Miami (OH)		–		2	–	2	–	0
Buchtel		–		3	–	4	–	0
Lake Forest		–		2	–	3	–	0
Cincinnati		–		1	–	2	–	0
Marquette		–		1	–	2	–	0
Ohio Wesleyan		–		1	–	3	–	0
Wittenberg		–		0	–	2	–	1
St. Ignatius College		–		0	–	1	–	0
Washburn		–		0	–	2	–	0
Kalamazoo		–		0	–	2	–	0

The 1892 Illinois Fighting Illini football team was an American football team that represented the University of Illinois during the 1892 college football season. In their first season under head coach Edward K. Hall, the Illini compiled a 7–4–1 record. Fullback Ralph W. Hart was the team captain.

== Schedule ==
Date	Time	Opponent	Site	Result	Attendance	Source
October 8		Purdue	Illinois Field; Champaign, IL (rivalry)	L 6–12		
October 12		Northwestern	Illinois Field; Champaign, IL (rivalry)	T 16–16		
October 21		at Washington University	St. Louis, MO	W 22–0		
October 22		vs. Doane	Omaha, NE	W 20–0		
October 24		at Nebraska	Lincoln Park; Lincoln, NE	L 0–6		
October 26		at Baker	Baldwin City, KS	W 26–10		
October 27	2:50 p.m.	at Kansas	McCook Field; Lawrence, KS	L 4–26	1,000	
October 29		at Kansas City Athletic Club	Exposition Park; Kansas City, MO	W 42–0		
November 5		Englewood High School	Illinois Field; Champaign, IL	W 38–0		
November 16		at Chicago	Chicago, IL	L 4–10		
November 18		DePauw	Illinois Field; Champaign, IL	W 34–0		
November 24		Chicago	Illinois Field; Champaign, IL	W 28–12		

== Roster ==
Armstrong, James W. LT; Ashley, Richard J. LG; Atherton, Geo H. LE; Cook, James W. QB; Gaut, Robert E. C; Hart, Ralph W. FB (capt); Huff, George A. LG; McCormick, Olin RG; Needham, James LT; Pfeffer, John E. RHB; Reeves, Harley E. RE; Royer, Joseph W. LHB; Slater, William F. LHB; Tackett, William C. RE; Woody, Frederick W. QB	Substitutes: Arms, Frank D. HB; Bush, Arthur W. LE; Scott, D.G. FB; Sweney, Don HB/LT; Sylvester, E.L. LG; Williams, Scott FB/E
