= Matt Franzen =

American football coach

Current position
- Title: Head coach
- Team: Hastings
- Conference: GPAC
- Record: 21–32

Playing career
- 1993: Doane
- Position: Offensive lineman

Coaching career (HC unless noted)
- 1996–2006: Hastings (assistant)
- 2007–2017: Doane
- 2021–present: Hastings

Administrative career (AD unless noted)
- 2018–2020: Doane

Head coaching record
- Overall: 86–81
- Tournaments: 0–2 (NAIA playoffs)

Matt Franzen is an American college football coach and former college athletic administrator. He is the head football coach for Hastings College, a position he has held since 2021. Franzen was the head football coach at Doane College in Crete, Nebraska from 2007 to 2017, compiling a record of 65–49. He was also the athletic director at Doane from 2018 to 2020.

Franzen succeeded Tommie Frazier as head football coach at Doane in 2007.

== Head coaching record ==
Year	Team	Overall	Conference	Standing	Bowl/playoffs	NAIA^{#}
Doane Tigers (Great Plains Athletic Conference) (2007–2017)
2007	Doane	4–6	4–6	T–6th		
2008	Doane	4–7	3–7	8th		
2009	Doane	4–7	4–6	T–7th		
2010	Doane	3–7	3–7	T–8th		
2011	Doane	8–2	7–2	T–2nd		19
2012	Doane	7–3	6–3	3rd		21
2013	Doane	5–5	5–4	T–5th		
2014	Doane	7–3	7–2	3rd		22
2015	Doane	9–2	8–1	2nd	L NAIA First Round	9
2016	Doane	9–2	7–1	2nd	L NAIA First Round	10
2017	Doane	5–5	3–5	T–6th		
Doane:		65–49	57–44			
Hastings Broncos (Great Plains Athletic Conference) (2021–present)
2021	Hastings	2–8	2–8	T–9th		
2022	Hastings	7–4	6–4	5th		
2023	Hastings	5–6	4–6	T–7th		
2024	Hastings	2–9	2–8	T–9th		
2025	Hastings	5–5	5–5	T–6th		
2026	Hastings	0–0	0–0			
Hastings:		21–32	19–31			
Total:		86–81				
