= Champaign–Urbana Courier =

American newspaper serving Champaign County, Illinois

- Owner: Lindsay–Schaub Newspapers (1934–1979)
- Founder: S.C. Harris
- Founded: 1877
- Ceased publication: March 31, 1979
- City: Champaign, Illinois
- Country: United States
- Free online archives: Illinois Digital Newspaper Collections: Urbana Daily Courier (1903–1935)

The Champaign–Urbana Courier was an American newspaper published from 1877 to 1979, serving Champaign County, Illinois.

== History ==
Founded as the Champaign County Herald in 1877 by S.C. Harris, it was purchased in 1879 by Milton W. Mathews. The paper continued publication after Mathews' death in 1892, but in 1906 merged with the Urbana Courier. It published as the Urbana Courier–Herald from 1906 to 1915.

From 1915 to 1934 it published as the Urbana Daily Courier, then the Evening Courier from 1934 to 1945. It was the Champaign–Urbana Courier for 45 years, from 1946 to 1971. In 1971, the name was changed again to the Courier until 1977, then it was named the Morning Courier from 1978 until its closure.

Lindsay-Schaub Newspapers, owner of the Herald and Review papers in Decatur, Illinois, owned the Courier from 1934 until its closure. When Lindsay-Schaub was sold to Lee Enterprises in early 1979, the Courier was not included in the purchase. Attempts to find another buyer failed, and the Courier published its last edition on March 31, 1979.
