= Laurence G. Leavitt =

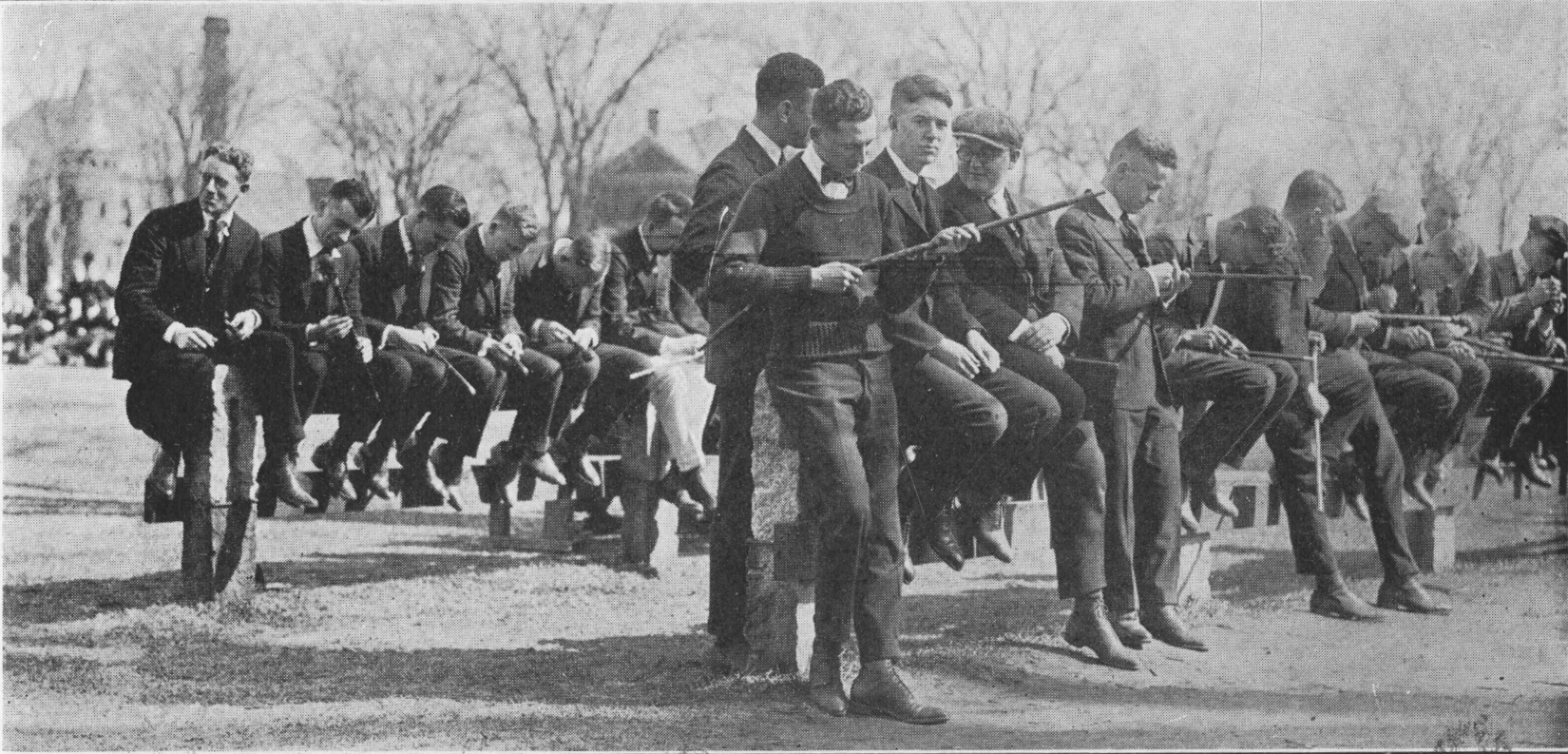
Dartmouth College students on The Green in 1922, during undergraduate years of Laurence G. Leavitt

Laurence Gillelan Leavitt (1903–2000) was the longtime headmaster of Vermont Academy in Saxtons River, Vermont, United States, where he succeeded in steering the preparatory school from dire financial straits to financial health by strengthening its curriculum and building its extracurricular activities.

== Biography ==
Leavitt was born on April 1, 1903, and lived in Portsmouth, New Hampshire, until he was fifteen. A graduate of Quincy High School in Quincy, Massachusetts, and Dartmouth College, where he was a star fullback on the college football team, Leavitt later served as assistant headmaster at Tabor Academy in Marion, Massachusetts. In 1934 Dartmouth College president Ernest Martin Hopkins, asked to suggest a candidate for the troubled Vermont Academy, which was teetering on the edge of bankruptcy, suggested his fellow Dartmouth graduate Laurence Leavitt.

During Leavitt's 25-year tenure as head of Vermont Academy, he managed to double enrollment, retire the school's debt and made substantial improvements to the school's campus.

Laurence Leavitt died at age 97 on November 30, 2000. He and his wife Dorothy (Hall) Leavitt lived for many years on Main Street in Norwich, Vermont, and they were longtime donors to Dartmouth College, where they established awards in field hockey and women's basketball. They also helped endow Dartmouth football's Bennett/Hall Lounge.

Leavitt received Dartmouth's Alumni Award in 1925. Dorothy (Hall) Leavitt was the daughter of Edward K. Hall, a Dartmouth College graduate, early American Telephone and Telegraph Company executive and later professor at Dartmouth's Amos Tuck School of Business Administration who, with his wife, donated the school infirmary Dick Hall's House to the college in honor of their son Richard Drew Hall who died as a Dartmouth sophomore in 1924.
