= 1892 St. Ignatius College Chicago football team =

American college football season

1892 St. Ignatius College Chicago football
- Conference: Independent
- Record: 0–1

1892 Midwestern college football independents records
| | Conf. | | | Overall |
| Team | W | L | T | W | | L | | T |
|---|---|---|---|---|---|---|---|---|
| Oberlin | | – | | 7 | – | 0 | – | 0 |
| Case | | – | | 3 | – | 0 | – | 0 |
| Iowa Agricultural | | – | | 1 | – | 0 | – | 1 |
| Notre Dame | | – | | 1 | – | 0 | – | 1 |
| Chicago | | – | | 8 | – | 4 | – | 1 |
| Michigan State Normal | | – | | 2 | – | 1 | – | 0 |
| Illinois | | – | | 7 | – | 4 | – | 1 |
| Ohio State | | – | | 5 | – | 3 | – | 0 |
| Washington University | | – | | 3 | – | 2 | – | 0 |
| Hillsdale | | – | | 3 | – | 2 | – | 1 |
| Doane | | – | | 1 | – | 1 | – | 0 |
| Heidelberg | | – | | 1 | – | 1 | – | 0 |
| Miami (OH) | | – | | 2 | – | 2 | – | 0 |
| Buchtel | | – | | 3 | – | 4 | – | 0 |
| Lake Forest | | – | | 2 | – | 3 | – | 0 |
| Cincinnati | | – | | 1 | – | 2 | – | 0 |
| Marquette | | – | | 1 | – | 2 | – | 0 |
| Ohio Wesleyan | | – | | 1 | – | 3 | – | 0 |
| Wittenberg | | – | | 0 | – | 2 | – | 1 |
| St. Ignatius College | | – | | 0 | – | 1 | – | 0 |
| Washburn | | – | | 0 | – | 2 | – | 0 |
| Kalamazoo | | – | | 0 | – | 2 | – | 0 |

The 1892 St. Ignatius College Chicago football team represented St. Ignatius College—now known as Loyola University Chicago—as an independent during the 1896 college football season. The team compiled a record of 0–1.

== Schedule ==
| Date | Opponent | Site | Result | Source |
|---|---|---|---|---|
| December 1 | Marquette | Polk Street Grounds; Chicago, IL | L 0–10 | |
