= 1892 Cincinnati football team =

American college football season

1892 Cincinnati football
- Conference: Independent
- Record: 1–2
- Head coach: None
- Captains: James Robinson; Dan Laurence
- Home stadium: East End Athletic Grounds

1892 Midwestern college football independents records
	Conf.			Overall
Team	W	L	T	W		L		T
Oberlin		–		7	–	0	–	0
Case		–		3	–	0	–	0
Iowa Agricultural		–		1	–	0	–	1
Notre Dame		–		1	–	0	–	1
Chicago		–		8	–	4	–	1
Michigan State Normal		–		2	–	1	–	0
Illinois		–		7	–	4	–	1
Ohio State		–		5	–	3	–	0
Washington University		–		3	–	2	–	0
Hillsdale		–		3	–	2	–	1
Doane		–		1	–	1	–	0
Heidelberg		–		1	–	1	–	0
Miami (OH)		–		2	–	2	–	0
Buchtel		–		3	–	4	–	0
Lake Forest		–		2	–	3	–	0
Cincinnati		–		1	–	2	–	0
Marquette		–		1	–	2	–	0
Ohio Wesleyan		–		1	–	3	–	0
Wittenberg		–		0	–	2	–	1
St. Ignatius College		–		0	–	1	–	0
Washburn		–		0	–	2	–	0
Kalamazoo		–		0	–	2	–	0

The 1892 Cincinnati football team was an American football team that represented the University of Cincinnati as an independent during the 1892 college football season. The team compiled a 1–2 record. Dan Laurence and James Robinson were the team captains. The team had no head coach.

== Schedule ==
Date	Time	Opponent	Site	Result	Attendance	Source
		Dayton YMCA	Cincinnati, OH	W 16–6		
November 5		at Centre	Danville, KY	L 4–12		
November 24	3:15 p.m.	Centre	East End Athletic Grounds; Cincinnati, OH	L 0–34	1,000	
