= 1892 Washburn Ichabods football team =

American college football season

1892 Washburn Ichabods football
- Conference: Independent
- Record: 0–2

1892 Midwestern college football independents records
	Conf.			Overall
Team	W	L	T	W		L		T
Oberlin		–		7	–	0	–	0
Case		–		3	–	0	–	0
Iowa Agricultural		–		1	–	0	–	1
Notre Dame		–		1	–	0	–	1
Chicago		–		8	–	4	–	1
Michigan State Normal		–		2	–	1	–	0
Illinois		–		7	–	4	–	1
Ohio State		–		5	–	3	–	0
Washington University		–		3	–	2	–	0
Hillsdale		–		3	–	2	–	1
Doane		–		1	–	1	–	0
Heidelberg		–		1	–	1	–	0
Miami (OH)		–		2	–	2	–	0
Buchtel		–		3	–	4	–	0
Lake Forest		–		2	–	3	–	0
Cincinnati		–		1	–	2	–	0
Marquette		–		1	–	2	–	0
Ohio Wesleyan		–		1	–	3	–	0
Wittenberg		–		0	–	2	–	1
St. Ignatius College		–		0	–	1	–	0
Washburn		–		0	–	2	–	0
Kalamazoo		–		0	–	2	–	0

The 1892 Washburn Ichabods football team represented Washburn College—now known as Washburn University—as an independent during the 1892 college football season. The Ichabods compiled a record of 0–2.

== Schedule ==
Date	Time	Opponent	Site	Result	Attendance	Source
October 24		Baker	Topeka, KS	L 0–14		
October 29	3:50 p.m.	at Kansas	McCook Field; Lawrence, KS	L 0–36	200	
