= Tim Banks =

American football player and coach (born 1971)

Current position
- Title: Co-defensive coordinator & safeties coach
- Team: Auburn
- Conference: SEC

Biographical details
- Born: December 16, 1971 (age 54); Detroit, Michigan

Playing career
- 1991–1994: Central Michigan
- Position: Cornerback

Coaching career (HC unless noted)
- 1996: Bowling Green (GA)
- 1997–1998: Ferris State (DB)
- 1999: Bowling Green (RB)
- 2000: Bowling Green (DB)
- 2001: Memphis (OLB)
- 2002: Memphis (DB)
- 2003–2005: Maryland (ILB)
- 2006: Maryland (DB)
- 2007–2009: Central Michigan (DC)
- 2010–2011: Cincinnati (co-DC/DB)
- 2012–2015: Illinois (DC/DB)
- 2016–2020: Penn State (co-DC/S)
- 2021–2025: Tennessee (DC/S)
- 2026–present: Auburn (co-DC/S)

Tim Banks (born December 16, 1971), is an American college football coach and former player. He is the co–defensive coordinator and safeties coach for the Auburn University. He played college football for Central Michigan.

== Early life ==
A native of Detroit, Michigan, Banks is a graduate of Martin Luther King High School.

== College playing career ==
After redshirting as a true freshman, Banks was a four-year letterwinner for the Central Michigan Chippewas. He was a two-time All-MAC second team selection at cornerback and was a co-captain on the Chippewas’ 1994 MAC Championship team. He led CMU in tackles in 1993 with 105 stops.

== Coaching career ==
=== Early coaching career ===
In 1996, Banks began his coaching career with the Bowling Green Falcons as a graduate assistant under head coach Gary Blackney. From there he spent two seasons with the Ferris State Bulldogs as the defensive backs coach. In 1999 and 2000, Banks made a return to Bowling Green as the running backs coach his first season and as the defensive backs coach the next.

Banks joined the Memphis Tigers staff in 2001 when head coach Tommy West took the reins of the Tiger program. He oversaw outside linebackers in his first season in Memphis before taking over as cornerbacks coach for the 2002 campaign. In his first season coaching cornerbacks, the Tigers finished ninth in Division I-A in pass defense, allowing an average of just 165.8 yards per game.

=== Maryland ===
In 2003, Banks was hired by head coach Ralph Friedgen to serve as the inside linebackers coach for the Maryland Terrapins. Coaching the inside linebackers for three seasons, Banks would help mentor D'Qwell Jackson to All-ACC honors three times, earning second team in 2003 and first team in 2004–05. He was also the 2005 ACC Defensive Player of the Year and a finalist for the Chuck Bednarik Award as the nation's top defensive player. Jackson was a second-round draft pick of the Cleveland Browns in the 2006 NFL draft. Banks also coached NFL Draft pick linebacker David Holloway.

In 2003 and 2004, Banks worked with future Penn State head coaches James Franklin and Bill O'Brien, when Franklin was the wide receivers coach and O'Brien the running backs coach.

Banks spent 2006 coaching the defensive backs and standout cornerback and NFL draft pick Josh Wilson.

=== Central Michigan ===
Banks was the defensive coordinator at his alma mater, the Central Michigan Chippewas from 2007 to 2009, serving under head coach Butch Jones.

In 2007 and 2008, the Chippewas led the Mid-American Conference in rush defense and the 2008 unit led the conference in sacks with 35. This helped Central Michigan secure invites to the Motor City Bowl both seasons.

The Chippewas would win the MAC Championship with a 12-2 overall record and win the 2010 GMAC Bowl.

=== Cincinnati ===
Banks spent the 2010 and 2011 seasons as the co-defensive coordinator and defensive backs coach for the Cincinnati Bearcats under Head Coach Butch Jones, Banks decided to follow Jones when he left Central Michigan to take the job in Cincinnati. The Bearcats defense forced 33 turnovers that season.

While at Cincinnati, Banks tutored defensive back Drew Frey to first team All-Big East accolades in 2011. Banks was also honored for his work during the 2011 season as he was a nominee for the Frank Broyles Award for the nation's top assistant coach.

=== Illinois ===
From 2012 to 2015, Banks spent four seasons as the co-defensive coordinator and secondary coach for the Illinois Fighting Illini. Banks would serve three seasons under head coach Tim Beckman and his final season under head coach Bill Cubit.

In 2015, Banks mentored safety Taylor Barton and defensive back V'Angelo Bentley to All-Big Ten honorable mention accolades. The Fighting Illini defense would finished 15th in the nation in passing yards allowed (184.4) and 21st in team passing efficiency defense (112.24) in that season.

=== Penn State ===
On January 18, 2016, Penn State head coach James Franklin announced Tim Banks as the Nittany Lions’ co-defensive coordinator and safeties coach.

In 2017, safeties Marcus Allen received All-Big Ten first team honors, while Troy Apke received honorable mention. That season the Nittany Lions' defense helped Penn State to its second-straight New Year's Six bowl and a Top 10 finish. Also the 16.5 points allowed per game was the fewest since the 2008 team gave up 12.2 per contest. Both starting safeties were selected in the 2018 NFL draft, Apke in the fourth round, 109th overall and Allen in the fifth round, 148th overall.

In 2018, safety Garrett Taylor earned honorable mention All-Big Ten honors. Penn State secondary had one of its best seasons since 2014, finishing the season with 13 interceptions and allowing a 53.6 completion rate. The Nittany Lions also held three opponents to 60 or less yards through the air, this was the first time PSU had accomplished this feat since the 1976 season. Safety Nick Scott was drafted by the Los Angeles Rams in the seventh round (243rd overall) of the 2019 NFL draft.

In 2019, both starting safeties Garrett Taylor and Lamont Wade received honorable mention All-Big Ten honors.

=== Tennessee ===
On February 15, 2021, Banks was hired to become the new defensive coordinator for Tennessee. After having one of the nation's best defenses in 2024, the Volunteers' defense severely regressed in 2025 following the losses of James Pearce Jr. and Omarr Norman-Lott to the NFL, finishing 92nd in the nation in scoring defense and 88th in yards allowed, allowing 28.8 points and 395.5 yards per game, respectively. Banks was subsequently fired following the season.

== Personal ==
- Degree: Bachelors, industrial management
- Family: Wife, Robin
