= 1892 Notre Dame football team =

American college football season

1892 Notre Dame football
- Conference: Independent
- Record: 1-0-1
- Head coach: None
- Captain: Pat Coady
- Home stadium: Brownson Hall field

1892 Midwestern college football independents records
	Conf.			Overall
Team	W	L	T	W		L		T
Oberlin		–		7	–	0	–	0
Case		–		3	–	0	–	0
Iowa Agricultural		–		1	–	0	–	1
Notre Dame		–		1	–	0	–	1
Chicago		–		8	–	4	–	1
Michigan State Normal		–		2	–	1	–	0
Illinois		–		7	–	4	–	1
Ohio State		–		5	–	3	–	0
Washington University		–		3	–	2	–	0
Hillsdale		–		3	–	2	–	1
Doane		–		1	–	1	–	0
Heidelberg		–		1	–	1	–	0
Miami (OH)		–		2	–	2	–	0
Buchtel		–		3	–	4	–	0
Lake Forest		–		2	–	3	–	0
Cincinnati		–		1	–	2	–	0
Marquette		–		1	–	2	–	0
Ohio Wesleyan		–		1	–	3	–	0
Wittenberg		–		0	–	2	–	1
St. Ignatius College		–		0	–	1	–	0
Washburn		–		0	–	2	–	0
Kalamazoo		–		0	–	2	–	0

The 1892 Notre Dame football team was an American football team that represented the University of Notre Dame in the 1892 college football season. Milestones for the season included the first 50-point game and the first tie in Notre Dame history.

== Schedule ==
Date	Time	Opponent	Site	Result	Attendance	Source
October 19		South Bend High School	Senior campus Field; Notre Dame, IN	W 56–0		
November 24	2:45 p.m.	Hillsdale	Brownson Hall field; Notre Dame, IN	T 10–10	1,200	

The contest against South Bend High School on October 19 was not considered a varsity match. The game was played by the Notre Dame secondary, also known as the anti-specials team. A varsity team was not established until several weeks later. The result and final score of the game vs Hillsdale is disputed. Newspapers from the time say 8–8 tie, 10–10 tie, and 10–1 Notre Dame Win. Modern Sources say 14–12 Notre Dame Loss.
