= 1892 Buchtel football team =

American college football season

1892 Buchtel football
- Conference: Independent
- Record: 3–4
- Head coach: Frank Cook (1st season)
- Captain: Johnson McLean

1892 Midwestern college football independents records
	Conf.			Overall
Team	W	L	T	W		L		T
Oberlin		–		7	–	0	–	0
Case		–		3	–	0	–	0
Iowa Agricultural		–		1	–	0	–	1
Notre Dame		–		1	–	0	–	1
Chicago		–		8	–	4	–	1
Michigan State Normal		–		2	–	1	–	0
Illinois		–		7	–	4	–	1
Ohio State		–		5	–	3	–	0
Washington University		–		3	–	2	–	0
Hillsdale		–		3	–	2	–	1
Doane		–		1	–	1	–	0
Heidelberg		–		1	–	1	–	0
Miami (OH)		–		2	–	2	–	0
Buchtel		–		3	–	4	–	0
Lake Forest		–		2	–	3	–	0
Cincinnati		–		1	–	2	–	0
Marquette		–		1	–	2	–	0
Ohio Wesleyan		–		1	–	3	–	0
Wittenberg		–		0	–	2	–	1
St. Ignatius College		–		0	–	1	–	0
Washburn		–		0	–	2	–	0
Kalamazoo		–		0	–	2	–	0

The 1892 Buchtel football team represented Buchtel College in the 1892 college football season. The team was led by first-year head coach Frank Cook, in his only season. Buchtel were outscored by their opponents by a total of 69–180.

== Schedule ==
Date	Opponent	Site	Result
October 15	Case	Akron, OH	L 9–14
October 22	at Kenyon	Gambier, OH	L 0–52
October 22	Ohio State	Akron, OH	L 0–62
October 29	Western Reserve	Akron, OH	L 0–52
November 12	Denison	Akron, OH	W 4–0
	Akron A.C.	Akron, OH	W 26–0
November 26	Hiram	Akron, OH	W 30–0
