= F. P. Reed =

American football coach and physician (1870–1942)

Biographical details
- Born: May 12, 1870; Weeping Water, Nebraska, U.S.
- Died: February 7, 1942 (aged 71); Stockton, California, U.S.
- Education: Dartmouth College (1892)

Playing career
- 1891: Dartmouth
- Position: Quarterback

Coaching career (HC unless noted)
- 1892: Doane

Head coaching record
- Overall: 1–1

Frederick Patrick Reed (May 12, 1870 – February 7, 1942) was an American college football coach and physician.

Reed was born in Weeping Water, Nebraska, in 1870. His father, William H. Reed, moved in 1858 to Nebraska, served as a state legislator, and platted the town of Weeping Water. The younger Reed attended Dartmouth College, graduating in 1892.

After graduating from Dartmouth, Reed served as the first head football coach at Doane College in Crete, Nebraska, holding that position for the 1892 season. His coaching record at Doane was 1–1. The team's loss was to the University of Illinois in a game played in Omaha.

In 1899, Reed received a Doctor of Medicine degree from the University Medical College in Kansas City, Missouri. He worked as a medical doctor in Colorado for several years. By 1920, he had moved to San Francisco, later settling in Stockton, California. He died n February 7, 1942, in Stockton.

== Head coaching record ==
Year	Team	Overall	Conference	Standing	Bowl/playoffs
Doane Tigers (Independent) (1892)
1892	Doane	1–1			
Doane:		1–1			
Total:		1–1			
