= Arthur R. Hall =

American football player and coach (1869–1955)

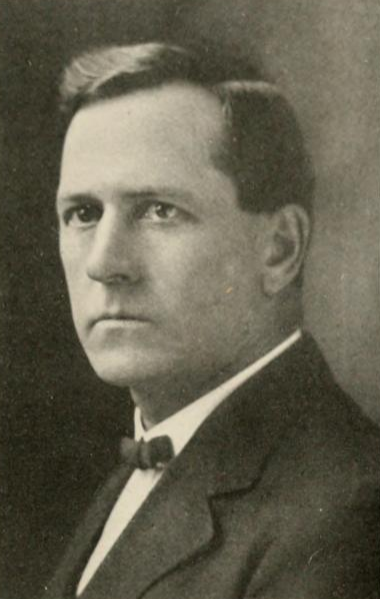
- Hall pictured in The Illio 1912, Illinois yearbook

Biographical details
- Born: June 4, 1869; Tonica, Illinois, U.S.
- Died: December 4, 1955 (aged 86); East Lynn, Illinois, U.S.
- Education: University of Illinois at Urbana–Champaign (1902)

Playing career
- 1898–1900: Illinois
- Position: End

Coaching career (HC unless noted)
- 1904: Illinois
- 1907–1912: Illinois

Head coaching record
- Overall: 36–12–4

Accomplishments and honors

Championships
- 1 Western (1910)

Arthur Raymond Hall (June 4, 1869 – December 4, 1955) was an American college football player and coach. He served as head football coach at the University of Illinois at Urbana–Champaign in 1904—along with Justa Lindgren, Fred Lowenthal, and Clyde Mathews—and alone from 1907 to 1912, compiling a record of 36–12–4. Hall was the first man to coach the Fighting Illini for longer than five seasons, leading them to the Big Ten Conference championship in 1910.

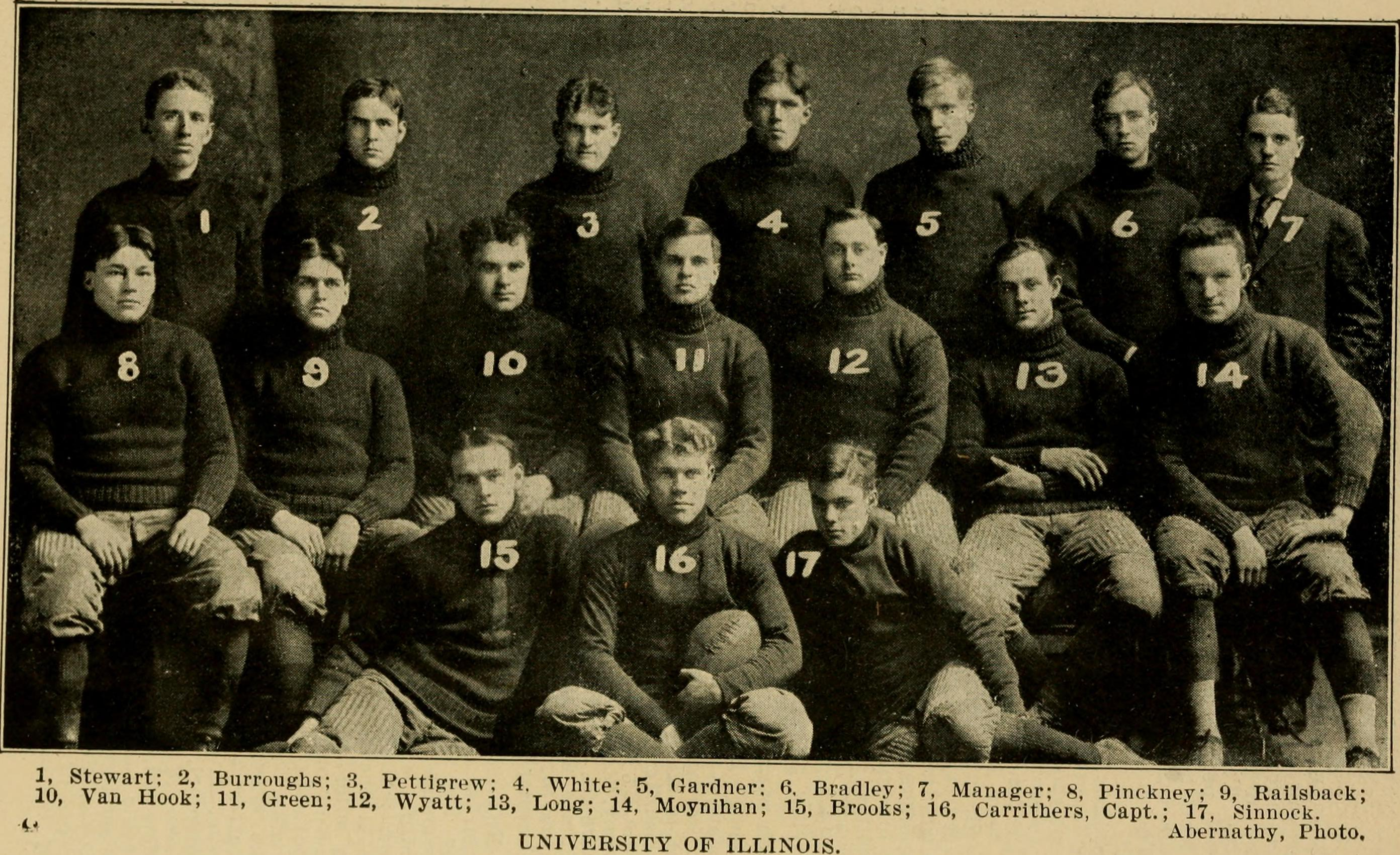
1907 NCAA football guide featuring Illini Football. The guide was the official rules book and record book of college football

He was born in Tonica, Illinois in 1869 and died at East Lynn, Illinois in 1955.

== Head coaching record ==
Year	Team	Overall	Conference	Standing	Bowl/playoffs
Illinois Fighting Illini (Western Conference) (1904)
1904	Illinois	9–2–1	3–1–1	4th	
Illinois Fighting Illini (Western Conference) (1907–1912)
1907	Illinois	3–2	3–2	4th	
1908	Illinois	5–1–1	4–1	2nd	
1909	Illinois	5–2	3–1	T–2nd	
1910	Illinois	7–0	4–0	T–1st	
1911	Illinois	4–2–1	2–2–1	T–4th	
1912	Illinois	3–3–1	1–3–1	6th	
Illinois:		36–12–4	20–10–3		
Total:		36–12–4			
National championship Conference title Conference division title or championship game berth
