= East Lynn, Illinois =

East Lynn
- Unincorporated community
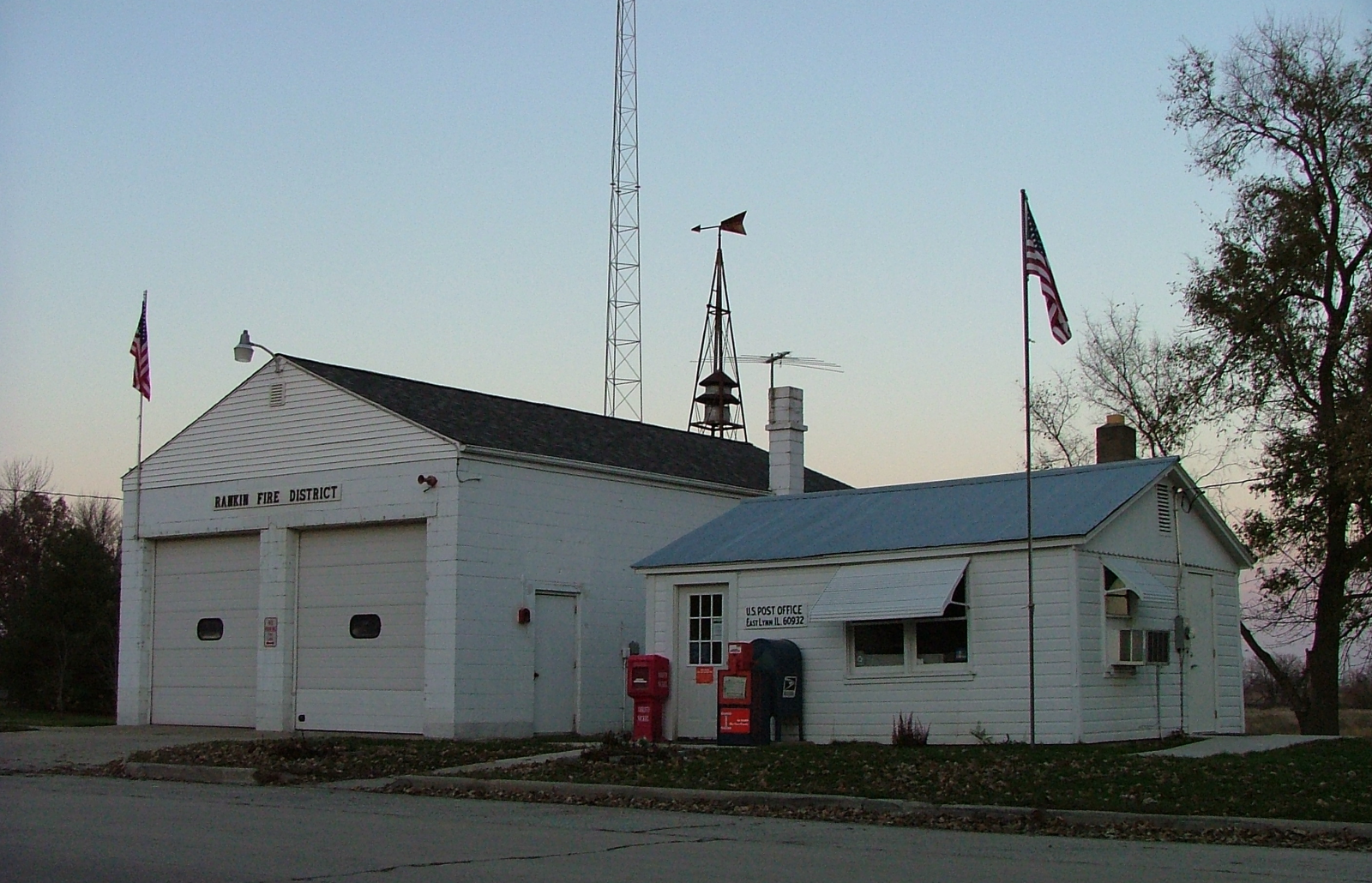
- Post office and fire department buildings

- Location of East Lynn within Illinois East Lynn (the United States)
- Coordinates: 40°27′58″N 87°48′02″W
- Country: United States
- State: Illinois
- County: Vermilion
- Township: Butler

Area
  - Total: 0.27 sq mi (0.69 km^{2})
  - Land: 0.27 sq mi (0.69 km^{2})
  - Water: 0 sq mi (0.00 km^{2})
- Elevation: 696 ft (212 m)

Population (2020)
  - Total: 90
  - Density: 339.3/sq mi (131.01/km^{2})
- Time zone: UTC-6 (CST)
  - Summer (DST): UTC-5 (CDT)
- Area code: 217
- FIPS code: 17–22021
- GNIS feature ID: 2806476

East Lynn is a Census-designated place in Butler Township, Vermilion County, Illinois, USA.

As of the 2020 census, East Lynn had a population of 90.

== History ==
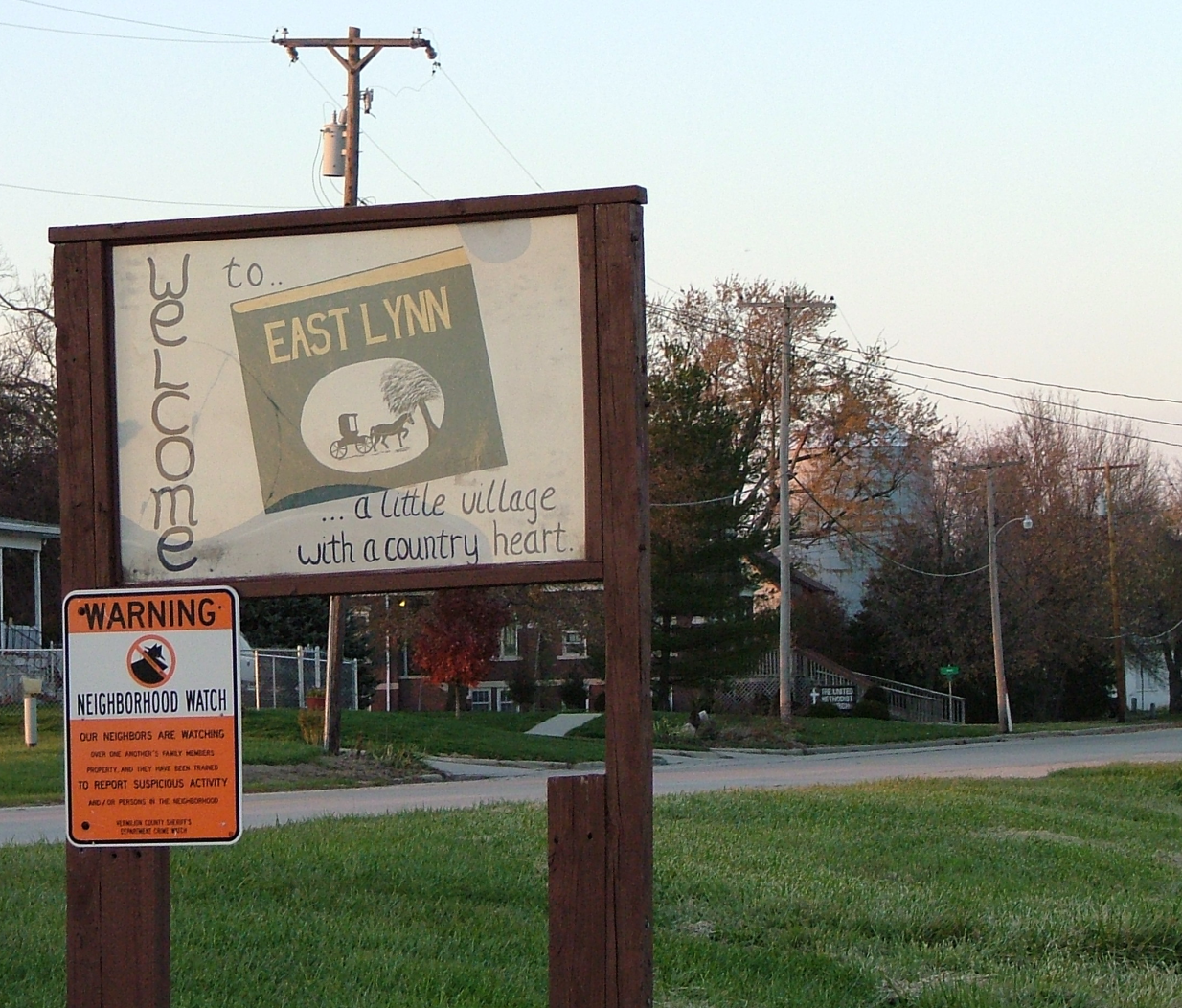
East Lynn welcome sign

The town, founded in 1872, is said to have been named after the novel and play entitled East Lynne. The Methodist church was actually founded before the town, in 1869. The main trade was in grain. One man, Henry Ludden, filled several early roles in the town, as the first postmaster, the first station agent and the first to operate a store.

== Demographics ==
Historical population
Census	Pop.	Note	%±
2020	90		—
U.S. Decennial Census

East Lynn first appeared as a census designated place in the 2020 U.S. census.

== Education ==
It is in the Hoopeston Area Community Unit School District 11.
