= Andy Wyant =

American football player (1867–1964)

Biographical details
- Born: May 20, 1867; Kittanning, Pennsylvania, U.S.
- Died: June 16, 1964 (aged 97); Chicago, Illinois, U.S.

Playing career
- 1887–1891: Bucknell
- 1892–1894: Chicago
- Positions: Guard, center
- College Football Hall of Fame; Inducted in 1962

Andrew Robert Elmer Wyant (May 20, 1867 - June 16, 1964) was an American football player, who played eight varsity seasons of college football, for an unprecedented total of 73 consecutive games, from 1887 to 1894. During this era of football, teams dressed in poorly made equipment and usually played heavy schedules. For example, during Wyant's final season in 1894 alone, he played in 23 games.

Wyant began his playing career for Bucknell University in 1887, while still a student in high school. He would go on to play five more seasons with the team. During his career, Wyant was nicknamed "Polyphemus," by his teammates, after the cyclops in Greek mythology. In 1892, he left Bucknell to attend the University of Chicago Divinity School. While in Chicago, he was played under the legendary coach, Amos Alonzo Stagg. Wyant later became just the second football captain at Chicago, succeeding Stagg.

In 1895 Wyant graduated from the Divinity School and served as a Baptist minister. He eventually earned five degrees, including a Doctorate of Medicine. He later worked as a teacher, minister, author, lecturer and financier. During World War I and World War II, he worked as a physician and served in the Red Cross. He was elected to the College Football Hall of Fame in 1962.

Wyant was the brother of Adam Martin Wyant, who became the first professional football player elected to the United States Congress.
