= Doane Tigers football =

Football team representing Doane University

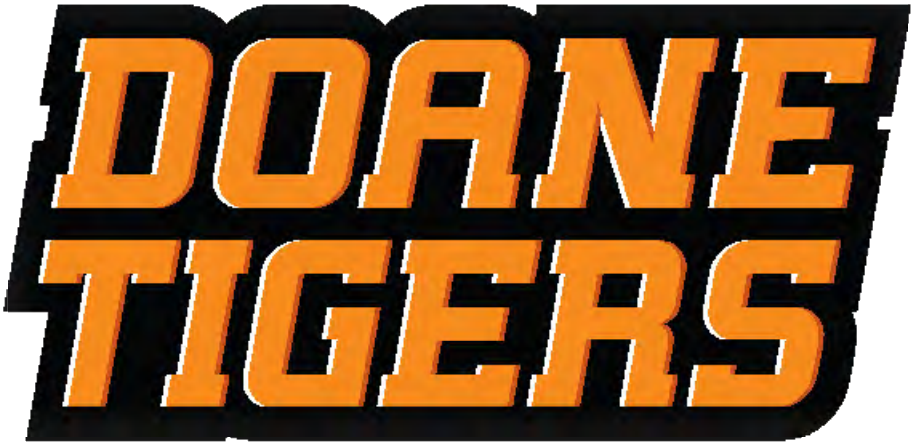
- First season: 1891; 135 years ago
- Athletic director: Mark Wateska
- Head coach: Jonathan Johnson; 3rd season, 5–16 (.238)
- Location: Crete, Nebraska
- Stadium: Al Papik Field (capacity: 2,250)
- League: NAIA
- Conference: GPAC
- Colors: Orange and black
- Bowl record: 0–0 (–)

National championships
- Claimed: 0

Conference championships
- 0
- Website: doaneathletics.com/football

The Doane Tigers football team represents Doane University in the sport of American football.

== History ==
The first college football coach at Doane was F.P. Reed, who led the team to a 1–1 record. Other coaches in its football history include Al Papik, Tommie Frazier, Matt Franzen and current head coach Jonathan Johnson.

1905 Nebraska State College Football Champions. After defeating Bellevue College, the 1905 Doane College football team became the Nebraska State Football Champions. Considered a formidable team, in no small part due to their combined weight, the Doane team lost their subsequent game with University of Nebraska Cornhuskers, 43–5. The largest player on the Doane team was 220 pound, left guard, Claude LeRoy Farrow of Aurora, Nebraska.

From 1965 to 1969, the football team was unbeaten in 38 consecutive games. The streak ended with a loss to Concordia College in the first game of 1970.

Doane's football team has participated in three bowl games, winning two and tying one. The first was the 1950 Bean Bowl where they defeated Colorado State College by a score of 14–6. Doane then had back-to-back appearances in the Mineral Water Bowl in 1967 and 1968. They have qualified for the NAIA National Playoffs six times, most recently in 2016, and were semifinalist in 1972 and 1997.
