= 2014 Heart of Dallas Bowl (December) =

2014 Zaxby's Heart of Dallas Bowl
- 5th Heart of Dallas Bowl
Illinois Fighting Illini	Louisiana Tech Bulldogs
(6–6)	(8–5)
Big Ten	C-USA
18	35
Head coach: Tim Beckman	Head coach: Skip Holtz
	1	2	3	4	Total
Illinois	3	6	6	3	18
Louisiana Tech	14	7	0	14	35
- Date: December 26, 2014
- Season: 2014
- Stadium: Cotton Bowl
- Location: Fair Park; Dallas, Texas
- MVP: Houston Bates (LB, Louisiana Tech)
- Favorite: Louisiana Tech by 7
- Referee: Land Clark (Pac-12)
- Attendance: 31,297

United States TV coverage
- Network: ESPN & RedVoice LLC
- Announcers: Mike Corey, Charles Arbuckle, & Kayce Smith (ESPN); Brian Estridge, John Denton, Rob Best, and Landry Burdine (RedVoice LLC)

The 2014 Heart of Dallas Bowl was an American college football bowl game played on December 26, 2014, at the Cotton Bowl at Fair Park in Dallas, Texas. The fifth edition of the Heart of Dallas Bowl featured the Illinois Fighting Illini against the Louisiana Tech Bulldogs. The game was played at 1:00 p.m. CST and aired on ESPN. It was one of the 2014–15 bowl games that concluded the 2014 FBS football season. The game is sponsored by the Zaxby's chicken restaurant franchise and is officially known as the Zaxby's Heart of Dallas Bowl.

Louisiana Tech beat Illinois by a score of 35–18.

This was the second overall meeting between these two teams, with the Bulldogs winning the first matchup in 2012.

== Illinois ==
Illinois came as a team on a series of streaks throughout the season. On the season the Illini had averaged 26.6 points per game but gave up an average of 34 points per game. Illinois can easily be summarized as a Jekyll and Hyde team. During their 6 wins the Illini scored an average of 33.8 points per game, but in their 6 losses they've gave up an average of 41.67 points per game. This was the Illini's first bowl game since 2011.

== Louisiana Tech ==
Louisiana Tech entered the bowl game as the C-USA West Division champs. The Bulldogs won six of their last eight games giving up an average of 20.5 points per game during that stretch. 3 of the Bulldogs five losses come to Top 25 teams.

== Game summary ==
With the win, the Bulldogs won their first bowl game since 2008.

=== Scoring summary ===
Scoring summary

Quarter	Time	Drive			Team	Scoring information	Score	
Quarter	Time	Plays	Yards	TOP	Team	Scoring information	ILL	La. Tech
1	7:29	6	63	1:26	La. Tech	Jarred Craft 16-yard touchdown run, Jonathan Barnes kick good	0	7
1	3:46	8	65	3:43	ILL	27-yard field goal by Taylor Zalewski	3	7
1	3:28	1	80	0:18	La. Tech	Kenneth Dixon 80-yard touchdown reception from Cody Sokol, Jonathan Barnes kick good	3	14
2	11:15	5	65	1:30	ILL	Jon Davis 25-yard touchdown reception from Reilly O'Toole, Taylor Zalewski kick failed	9	14
2	7:20	–	–	–	La. Tech	Interception returned 69 yards for touchdown by Xavier Woods, Jonathan Barnes kick good	9	21
3	6:04	9	72	4:17	ILL	Donovonn Young 3-yard touchdown run, 2-point pass incomplete	15	21
4	14:01	10	49	3:59	ILL	43-yard field goal by David Reisner	18	21
4	6:15	5	74	2:20	La. Tech	Kenneth Dixon 1-yard touchdown run, Jonathan Barnes kick good	18	28
4	3:43	6	49	1:36	La. Tech	Blake Martin 28-yard touchdown run, Jonathan Barnes kick good	18	35
"TOP" = time of possession. For other American football terms, see Glossary of American football.							18	35

=== Statistics ===
	1	2	3	4	Total
Fighting Illini	3	6	6	3	18
Bulldogs	14	7	0	14	35

Statistics	ILL	La. Tech
First downs	26	16
Plays–yards	80–451	59–361
Rushes–yards	33–122	31–114
Passing yards	329	247
Passing: Comp–Att–Int	28–47–1	14–28–0
Time of possession	35:00	25:00

Team	Category	Player	Statistics
ILL	Passing	Reilly O'Toole	24/39, 295 yds, 1 TD, 1 INT
ILL	Rushing	Josh Ferguson	7 car, 50 yds
ILL	Receiving	Malik Turner	6 rec, 84 yds
La. Tech	Passing	Cody Sokol	14/28, 247 yds, 1 TD
La. Tech	Rushing	Kenneth Dixon	13 car, 63 yds, 1 TD
La. Tech	Receiving	Carlos Henderson	4 rec, 93 yds
