= Edward K. Hall =

American lawyer

Biographical details
- Born: June 9, 1870; Granville, Illinois, U.S.
- Died: November 10, 1932 (aged 62); Hanover, New Hampshire, U.S.

Playing career

Football
- 1890–1891: Dartmouth
- Position: End

Coaching career (HC unless noted)

Football
- 1892–1893: Illinois

Baseball
- 1892–1894: Illinois

Administrative career (AD unless noted)
- 1892–1894: Illinois

Head coaching record
- Overall: 12–6–4 (football); 30–17 (baseball)
- College Football Hall of Fame; Inducted in 1951 (profile)

Edward Kimball Hall (June 9, 1870 – November 10, 1932) was an American football and baseball player and coach, college athletics administrator, lawyer, and business executive. He played college football at Dartmouth College from 1889 to 1891 and then served as the athletic director and head football and baseball coach at the University of Illinois from 1892 to 1894.

His business career included employment as a vice president of American Telephone and Telegraph Company from 1919 to 1930. He also served as a director of several companies, including Atlas Corporation, Electric Bond and Share Company, and United Fruit Company.

Hall gained his greatest notoriety from his work as an administrator in the formative years of the National Collegiate Athletic Association (NCAA). After a spate of fatalities in 1905, football came under fire from college administrators, alumni, and President Theodore Roosevelt. The NCAA was formed in March 1906 in response to the controversy, and Hall was chosen to develop changes in the rules to make the game safer and more interesting. He replaced Walter Camp as secretary of college football's rules committee in 1906 and served as the committee's chairman from 1911 until his death in 1932.

== Early years ==
Hall was born in 1870 in Granville, Illinois, approximately 100 miles southwest of Chicago. His father, Charles Prentiss Hall, was a New Hampshire native, teacher and high school principal who had served in the 14th New Hampshire Volunteer Infantry during the American Civil War. His mother, Lucia Cotton Kimball Hall, was also a New Hampshire native. By 1880, Hall had moved to Hinsdale, New Hampshire, where his father became the superintendent of schools.

Hall attended preparatory school at the St. Johnsbury Academy in Vermont. He then attended Oberlin College in Ohio for one year before enrolling at Dartmouth College. He played at the end position on the Dartmouth football team and was captain of the 1891 team.

== University of Illinois ==
In July 1892, several days after graduating from Dartmouth, Hall was hired by the University of Illinois to serve as head football coach and director of physical training at a salary of $1,000. He announced at the time that he would spend the summer working as a waiter at a hotel in Old Orchard Beach, Maine, before reporting to Illinois. He was the third head football coach at Illinois, held that position for the 1892 and 1893 seasons, and led the team to a record of 12–6–4 in his two years as head coach. His 1892 team compiled a 9–4–1 record, played the first games in the football rivalries with Northwestern and Chicago, and played six road games in nine days (four wins and two losses) in late October 1892. Hall was also the first head baseball coach at Illinois, coaching three seasons from 1892 to 1894 and tallying a mark of 30–17. While at Illinois, Hall also studied law at the office of a prominent lawyer in Urbana, Illinois, and organized the first intercollegiate track meet in the Midwest.

== Business career ==
Hall earned an LL.B from Harvard Law School in 1896. He was admitted to the Pennsylvania bar in 1896 and practiced law in Scranton, Pennsylvania. He moved to Boston and was admitted to the Massachusetts bar in 1898. He practiced law in Boston with Samuel L. Powers at the firm of Powers, Hall & Jones. From 1913 to 1917, he was vice president of the New England Telephone and Telegraph Company. In 1917, he became vice president of the Electric Bond and Share Company. He also served as a vice president of the Boston Chamber of Commerce. During World War I, Hall served as business director of the Student Army Training Corps. After the war, he was employed for a time by the War Department.

In 1919, Hall moved to New York and became a vice president of the American Telephone and Telegraph Company (AT&T). In April 1930, he retired at age 60 from his position at AT&T, leaving a reported salary of $50,000. He moved to Hanover, New Hampshire, where he lectured on industrial relations and management at Dartmouth's Tuck School of Business. Even after retiring from his position at AT&T, he continued to serve as a director of several prominent industrial and banking companies (including Atlas Corporation, Electric Bond and Share Company, and New England Telephone & Telegraph Co.) and in early 1932 became a director of the United Fruit Company.

== Family and later years ==
Hall married to Sally Drew Hall in 1902. They had three children, sons Edward K. Hall, Jr., and Richard Drew Hall, and a daughter, Dorothy who became Mrs. Laurence G. Leavitt. In 1924, their son, Richard Drew Hall, died after a few hours' illness while a sophomore at Dartmouth. Hall donated an infirmary at Dartmouth that was named Dick Hall's house in honor of his son.

Hall died from a heart attack at age 62 at his home in Hanover, New Hampshire, in November 1932. At a funeral service held at the Dartmouth College Chapel, Hall was lauded as "the 'savior' of American college football." He was buried in Dartmouth Cemetery. Famed sports writer Allison Danzig called Hall's death "the heaviest blow football has suffered in years."

In 1933, Hall ranked seventh in voting by the Associated Press to select the greatest sports leaders of the past decade. In 1951, he was elected by the country's sports writers and broadcasters as part of the inaugural class (32 players, 21 coaches) to be inducted into the newly organized Football Hall of Fame (later renamed the College Football Hall of Fame).

Hall's papers were later donated to Dartmouth and are housed at the Rauner Special Collections Library.

== Head coaching record ==
=== Football ===
Year	Team	Overall	Conference	Standing	Bowl/playoffs
Illinois Fighting Illini (Illinois Intercollegiate Football League) (1892–1893)
1892	Illinois	9–4–1			
1893	Illinois	3–2–3			
Illinois:		12–6–4			
Total:		12–6–4			
