= Robert Lackey (American football) =

American football coach

Coaching career (HC unless noted)
- 1891: Illinois

Head coaching record
- Overall: 6–0

Robert Lackey was an American college football coach. He served as the second head football coach at the University of Illinois, coaching for one season in 1891 and compiling a record of 6–0.

== Head coaching record ==
Year	Team	Overall	Conference	Standing	Bowl/playoffs
Illinois Fighting Illini (Illinois Intercollegiate Football League) (1891)
1891	Illinois	6–0			
Illinois:		6–0			
Total:		6–0			
