= Clyde Mathews =

American football coach

Biographical details
- Born: December 22, 1878; Urbana, Illinois, U.S.
- Died: December 29, 1929 (aged 51); Urbana, Illinois, U.S.

Playing career

Football
- 1900: Illinois

Baseball
- 1899–1902: Illinois
- Position: Quarterback (football)

Coaching career (HC unless noted)

Football
- 1904: Illinois

Head coaching record
- Overall: 9–2–1

Clyde Milton Mathews (December 22, 1878 – December 29, 1929) was an American college football player and coach, college baseball player, and lawyer. He served as head football coach at the University of Illinois in 1904 along with Arthur R. Hall, Justa Lindgren, and Fred Lowenthal, compiling a record of 9–2–1. Mathews played football at Illinois as a quarterback in 1900.

Mathews was born on December 22, 1878, in Urbana, Illinois. His father, Milton W. Mathews, was a prominent lawyer and politician. Mathews graduated from the University of Illinois College of Law in 1903. He then practiced law in Urbana, and was associated with firm of Green & Palmer. Mathews died of a heart attack, on December 29, 1929, at his home in Urbana.

== Head coaching record ==
Year	Team	Overall	Conference	Standing	Bowl/playoffs
Illinois Fighting Illini (Western Conference) (1904)
1904	Illinois	9–2–1	3–1–1	4th	
Illinois:		9–2–1	3–1–1		
Total:		9–2–1			
