= Fred Lowenthal =

American football player, coach, sportswriter, and attorney (1878–1931)

Biographical details
- Born: November 22, 1878; Chicago, Illinois, U.S.
- Died: October 4, 1931 (aged 52); Chicago, Illinois, U.S.

Playing career
- 1898–1901: Illinois
- Position: Center

Coaching career (HC unless noted)
- 1904–1905: Illinois

Head coaching record
- Overall: 14–6–1

Fred Lowenthal (November 22, 1878 – October 4, 1931) was an American college football player, coach, sportswriter, and attorney. He served as head football coach at the University of Illinois at Urbana–Champaign in 1904, along with Arthur R. Hall, Justa Lindgren, and Clyde Mathews, and alone in 1905, compiling a record of 14–6–1. Lowenthal played football at Illinois as a center from 1898 to 1901.

== Head coaching record ==
Year	Team	Overall	Conference	Standing	Bowl/playoffs
Illinois Fighting Illini (Western Conference) (1904–1905)
1904	Illinois	9–2–1	3–1–1	4th	
1905	Illinois	5–4	0–3	9th	
Illinois:		14–6–1	3–4–1		
Total:		14–6–1			
