= Illinois Intercollegiate Football League =

College sports conference in Iowa, 1891–1895

The Illinois Intercollegiate Football League was a short-lived intercollegiate athletic football conference that existed from 1891 to 1895. As its name suggests, the league's members were located in the state of Illinois. It is unknown which teams won the IIFL football championship during its five seasons in existence.

== Champions ==
- 1890 - Illinois (6–0)

== See also ==
- List of defunct college football conferences
