= Louis Vail =

American football player and coach (1870–1948)

Biographical details
- Born: September 18, 1870; Philadelphia, Pennsylvania, U.S.
- Died: December 16, 1948 (aged 78)
- Education: Penn Law School

Playing career

Football
- 1889–1893: Penn
- 1895: Duquesne Country & Athletic Club

Baseball
- 1891–1892: Penn
- Position: Quarterback

Coaching career (HC unless noted)
- 1894: Illinois
- 1895: Case
- 1895: Duquesne Country & Athletic Club
- 1896: Cheltenham Military Academy
- 1897–1899: Germantown Academy

Head coaching record
- Overall: 4–5 (college)

Louis De Pui "Bucky" Vail (September 18, 1870 – December 16, 1948) was an American football player and coach. Vail played football and graduated from Germantown Academy. He attended the University of Pennsylvania, receiving both his A.B. and his LL.B. He was a member of Delta Phi Fraternity. Vail played football at Penn as a quarterback from 1889 to 1893. Vail also played baseball at Penn in 1891 and 1892.

== Coaching career ==
Vail served as the fourth head football coach at the University of Illinois at Urbana–Champaign, coaching for one season in 1894 and compiling a record of 4–4. Vail coached at Case School of Applied Science for one game in 1895 before the season was cancelled. Later that year, he served as player-coach of the Duquesne Country and Athletic Club football team.

He coached the Cheltenham Military Academy football team in 1896 before returning the following year to his former preparatory school, Germantown Academy, where he coached for three seasons.

=== College head coaching record ===
| Year | Team | Overall | Conference | Standing | Bowl/playoffs |
|---|---|---|---|---|---|
Illinois Fighting Illini (Independent) (1894)
| 1894 | Illinois | 4–4 | | | |
| Illinois: | | 4–4 | | | |
Case (Independent) (1895)
| 1895 | Case | 0–1 | | | |
| Case: | | 0–1 | | | |
| Total: | | 4–5 | | | |

== Family ==
He was an older brother of college sports coach Fred Vail.
