= Justa Lindgren =

American football player and coach (1878–1951)

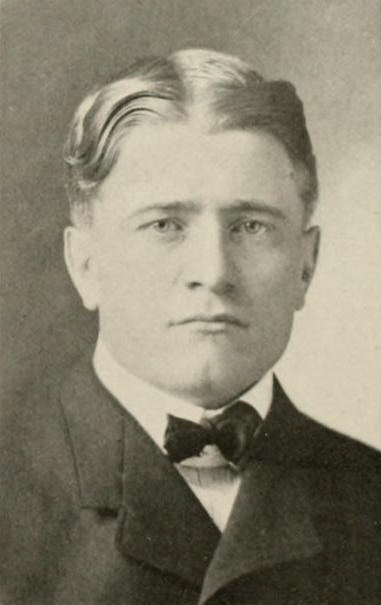
- Lindgren pictured in The Illio 1912, Illinois yearbook

Biographical details
- Born: July 28, 1878; Illinois, U.S.
- Died: May 29, 1951 (aged 72); Urbana, Illinois, U.S.

Playing career
- 1898–1901: Illinois

Coaching career (HC unless noted)
- 1902–1903: Cornell (IA)
- 1904: Illinois
- 1905: Illinois (line)
- 1906: Illinois
- 1907–1943: Illinois (line)

Head coaching record
- Overall: 14–16–2

Justa Morris Lindgren (July 28, 1878 – May 29, 1951) was an American college football player and coach. He served as head football coach at Cornell College in Mount Vernon, Iowa from 1902 to 1903 and the University of Illinois in 1904—along with Arthur R. Hall, Fred Lowenthal, and Clyde Mathews—and alone in 1906, compiling a career coaching record of 14–16–2. Lindgren played football at Illinois from 1898 to 1901 and was the captain of the 1901 team. In addition to his two stints as a head coach, he served a line coach for the team until 1943.

Lindgren was also a chemist. He served on the chemistry staff at the University of Illinois and was an analyst for the Illinois Geological Survey and the State Water Survey.

== Head coaching record ==
Year	Team	Overall	Conference	Standing	Bowl/playoffs
Cornell Purple (Independent) (1902–1903)
1902	Cornell	6–3			
1903	Cornell	1–8			
Cornell:		4–11			
Illinois Fighting Illini (Western Conference) (1904)
1904	Illinois	9–2–1	3–1–1	4th	
Illinois Fighting Illini (Western Conference) (1906)
1906	Illinois	1–3–1	1–3	5th	
Illinois:		10–5–2	4–4–1		
Total:		14–16–2			
