= Scott Williams (American football coach) =

American football player and coach

Playing career
- 1890–1892: Illinois
- Position: Quarterback

Coaching career (HC unless noted)
- 1890: Illinois

Head coaching record
- Overall: 1–2

Scott Williams was an American college football player and coach. He served as the first head football coach at the University of Illinois, coaching for one season in 1890 and compiling a record of 1–2.

== Head coaching record ==
Year	Team	Overall	Conference	Standing	Bowl/playoffs
Illinois Fighting Illini (Independent) (1890)
1890	Illinois	1–2			
Illinois:		1–2			
Total:		1–2			
