= Tim Beckman =

American football player and coach (born 1965)

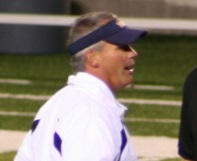
- Beckman in 2009 as Toledo head coach

Biographical details
- Born: January 19, 1965 (age 61)

Playing career
- 1983: Kentucky
- 1984–1987: Findlay
- Position: Defensive back

Coaching career (HC unless noted)
- 1988–1989: Auburn (GA)
- 1990–1995: Western Carolina (DB/RC)
- 1996–1997: Elon (DC/RC)
- 1998–2004: Bowling Green (AHC/DC)
- 2005–2006: Ohio State (CB)
- 2007–2008: Oklahoma State (DC)
- 2009–2011: Toledo
- 2012–2014: Illinois

Head coaching record
- Overall: 33–41
- Bowls: 0–2

Timothy David Beckman (born January 19, 1965) is an American former football coach. He served as the head football coach at the University of Toledo from 2009 to 2011 and at the University of Illinois at Urbana–Champaign from 2012 to 2014, compiling a career college football coaching record of 33–41. Beckman was terminated by Illinois on August 28, 2015, seven days prior to the Illini's scheduled season opener, after numerous allegations of abuse of players surfaced.

== Early life ==
Beckman attended high school at Forest Park High School in Beaumont, Texas, for two years before completing his secondary education at Berea High School in Berea, Ohio.

Beckman is the son of David Beckman, a longtime NCAA, NFL, and CFL coach and scout.

He attended the University of Findlay, where he lettered on the football team for two years; in both years the Oilers qualified for the NAIA Football National Championship playoffs. He graduated from Findlay in 1985 with a degree in physical education.

== Coaching career ==
=== Assistant coach ===
Beckman began his coaching career at Auburn as a graduate assistant under Pat Dye from 1988 to 1989. Auburn were SEC co-champions in those seasons, and Beckman earned a master's degree in education from Auburn. From 1990 to 1995, Beckman was secondary coach and recruiting coordinator at Western Carolina. He later became defensive coordinator and recruiting coordinator at Elon, a position he would hold from 1996 to 1997.

Beckman coached at Bowling Green as defensive coordinator and associate head coach from 1998 to 2004 and at Ohio State under Jim Tressel as cornerbacks coach from 2005 to 2006, where he was a three-time nominee for the Frank Broyles Award.

Beckman was the defensive coordinator at Oklahoma State University from 2007 to 2008. The Cowboys posted a record of 16–10 during those seasons.

=== Toledo ===
On December 4, 2008, Beckman was hired as the head coach at Toledo, to replace Tom Amstutz, who resigned during the 2008 season. Beckman's teams at Toledo saw consistent improvement. The 2008 team he inherited went 3–9. In 2009, his first year as a head coach, his team improved to finish 5–7. In the following year, his team finished 8–5, 7–1 in the MAC, earning a berth to the 2010 Little Caesar's Pizza Bowl, which they lost 34–32 to the FIU Golden Panthers. In his final year at Toledo, Coach Beckman finished 9–4, 7–1 in the MAC to be West Division co-champions with Northern Illinois. This team earned a berth to the 2011 Military Bowl. However, Beckman left after the regular season to become the head coach for Illinois.

=== Illinois ===
At Illinois, Beckman went 12–25 in three seasons, and only won four games in Big Ten play. In his third season, the Illini managed to qualify for a bowl with a 6–6 record, but lost 35–18 to Louisiana Tech in the Heart of Dallas Bowl.

On August 28, 2015—just a week before what was to be his fourth season—Beckman was fired after the preliminary results of an internal investigation substantiated accusations of gross player mistreatment. Most seriously, the investigation found that he'd forced players to play through serious injuries and had the medical staff clear these players too soon.

In a statement, Beckman called his ouster a "rush to judgment" that violated the terms of his contract, and stated that he intended to "vigorously defend both my reputation and my legal rights."

On April 11, 2016, Beckman settled with the university for a one time payment of $250,000 with the decision of firing "for cause" due to the mistreatment of players standing.

=== North Carolina ===
On August 24, 2016; Beckman was hired to serve as a volunteer assistant defensive coach for the North Carolina Tar Heels, working under head coach Larry Fedora. Beckman and Fedora have a working history together, having both served as assistant coaches on Mike Gundy's staff at Oklahoma State in 2007. However, after a firestorm of criticism, Beckman resigned from this position the next day, claiming he did not want to be a "distraction." It was later revealed that UNC chancellor Carol Folt had strongly objected to Beckman's presence, even in a volunteer role, once she learned about the arrangement.

== Controversies ==
=== Toledo ===
In 2013, a former Toledo football player, Kyle Cameron, sued Beckman, the University of Toledo, and five members of Beckman's staff at Toledo for negligence and for violating Ohio's anti-hazing law. Cameron's lawsuit and appeal were dismissed as the suit was filed through the incorrect division of the Lucas County Court. Cameron's legal counsel asked the Supreme Court of Ohio to review the case.

=== Illinois ===
Beckman was hired on December 9, 2011, by Illinois athletic director Mike Thomas. Prior to the start of the 2012 season, Beckman sent six Illinois assistant coaches to State College, Pennsylvania to recruit Penn State football players who the NCAA deemed eligible to transfer without missing playing time due to the Penn State child sex abuse scandal. In October 2012 season, Illinois self-reported secondary violations to the NCAA as television cameras caught Beckman using chewing tobacco on the sidelines during a football game at Wisconsin.

== Head coaching record ==
Year	Team	Overall	Conference	Standing	Bowl/playoffs
Toledo Rockets (Mid-American Conference) (2009–2011)
2009	Toledo	5–7	3–5	4th (West)	
2010	Toledo	8–5	7–1	2nd (West)	L Little Caesars Pizza
2011	Toledo	8–4 (Note: Beckman left for Illinois before the 2011 Military Bowl. Matt Campbell was appointed as the team's new head coach.)	7–1	T–1st (West)	Military
Toledo:		21–16	17–7		
Illinois Fighting Illini (Big Ten Conference) (2012–2014)
2012	Illinois	2–10	0–8	6th (Leaders)	
2013	Illinois	4–8	1–7	5th (Leaders)	
2014	Illinois	6–7	3–5	5th (West)	L Heart of Dallas
Illinois:		12–25	4–20		
Total:		33–41			
National championship Conference title Conference division title or championship game berth

== See also ==
- List of Auburn University people
