= 1893 Michigan Wolverines football team =

American college football season

1893 Michigan Wolverines football
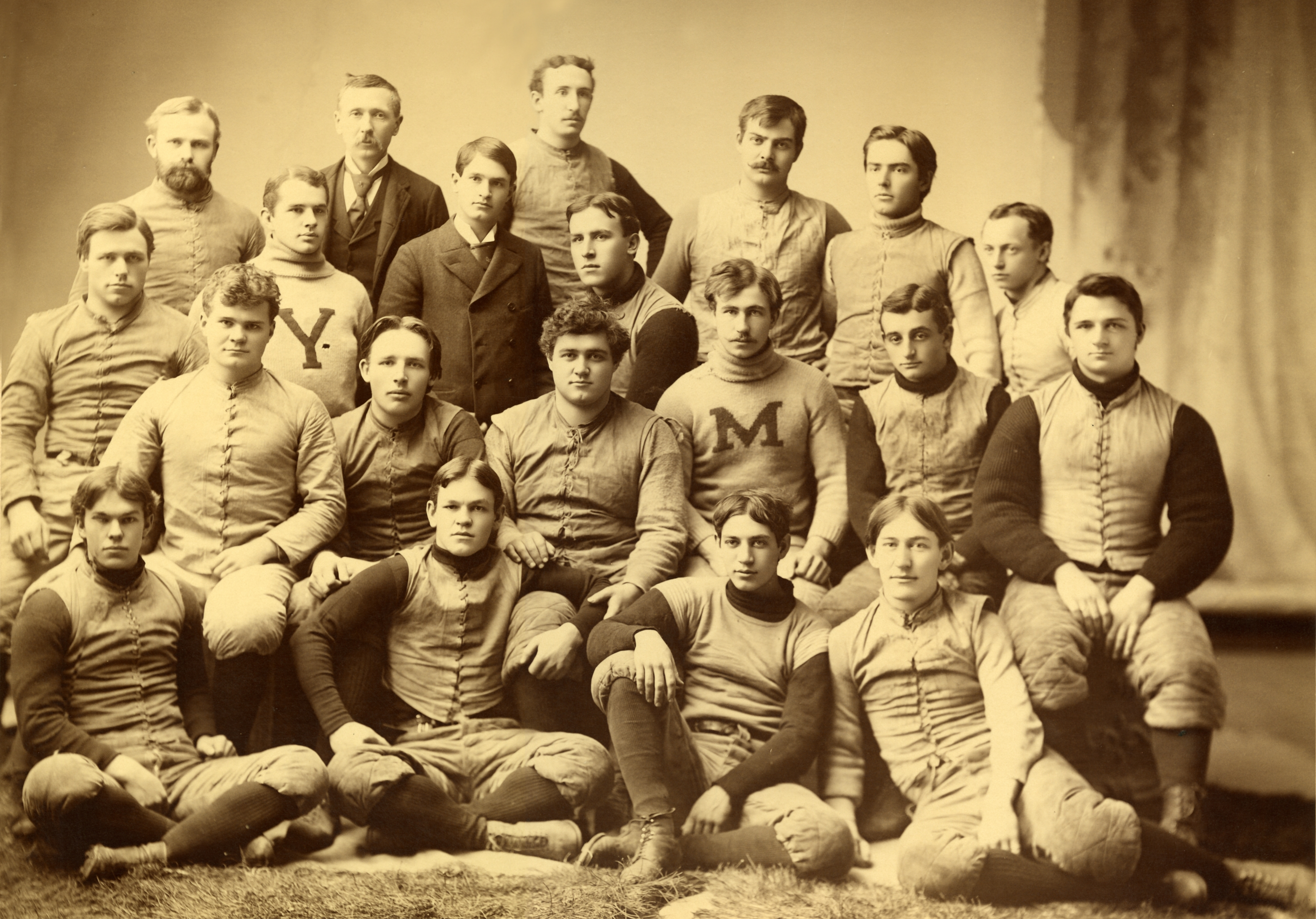
- Conference: Intercollegiate Athletic Association of the Northwest
- Record: 7–3 (1–2 IAANW)
- Head coach: Frank Barbour (2nd season)
- Captain: George Dygert
- Home stadium: Regents Field

1893 Intercollegiate Athletic Association of the Northwest football standings
	Conf.					Overall
Team	W		L		T	W		L		T
Minnesota $	3	–	0	–	0	6	–	0	–	0
Wisconsin	1	–	1	–	0	4	–	2	–	0
Michigan	1	–	2	–	0	7	–	3	–	0
Northwestern	0	–	2	–	0	2	–	5	–	3
$ – Conference champion

The 1893 Michigan Wolverines football team was an American football that represented the University of Michigan as a member of the Intercollegiate Athletic Association of the Northwest during the 1893 college football season. In its second season under head coach Frank Barbour, the team compiled a 7–3 record and outscored its opponents by a combined score of 278 to 102.

The Wolverines lost three games in the middle of the season to Amos Alonzo Stagg's Chicago Maroons, Minnesota, and Wisconsin, then closed the season with five consecutive victories, including victories over Purdue (46–8), Northwestern (72–6), and Kansas (22–0), and a Thanksgiving Day victory (28–10) in a rematch with Chicago.

== Schedule ==
Date	Time	Opponent	Site	Result	Attendance
October 7		Detroit Athletic Club*	Regents Field; Ann Arbor, MI	W 6–0	
October 14	4:25 p.m.	at Detroit Athletic Club*	D.A.C. grounds; Detroit, MI	W 26–0	150
October 21	4:00 p.m.	at Chicago*	University of Chicago Athletic Grounds; Chicago, IL (rivalry)	L 6–10	
October 28	3:00 p.m.	Minnesota	Regents Field; Ann Arbor, MI (rivalry)	L 20–34	
November 4		Wisconsin	Regents Field; Ann Arbor, MI	L 18–34	1,000
November 11	2:35 p.m.	at Purdue*	Stuart Field; West Lafayette, IN	W 46–8	2,000
November 13		at DePauw*	Greencastle, IN	W 34–0	
November 18		Northwestern	Regents Field; Ann Arbor, MI (rivalry)	W 72–6	800
November 25	3:15 p.m.	vs. Kansas*	Fairmount Oval; Kansas City, MO	W 22–0	3,000
November 30	11:23 a.m.	at Chicago*	Marshall Field; Chicago, IL (rivalry)	W 28–10	3,500
*Non-conference game

== Game summaries ==
=== Game 1: Detroit Athletic Club ===
On October 7, Michigan defeated the Deltas of Detroit Athletic Club by a 6–0 score before a crowd of between 300 and 400 spectators at Regents Field in Ann Arbor. Left halfback Raynor Freund scored Michigan's touchdown (four points) after 16 minutes into the game, and fullback George Dygert kicked the goal from touchdown (two points). Neither team scored in the second half. Michigan's lineup in the game was Gustave Ferbert (left end), Edwin A. Murbach (left tackle), Willard W. Griffin (left guard), Charles T. Griffin (center), Frederick W. Henninger (right guard), William I. Aldrich (right tackle), Ralph W. Hayes and Walter A. Parker (right end), James Baird (quarterback), Freund (left halfback), Avery (right halfback), and Dygert (fullback).

=== Game 2: at Detroit Athletic Club ===
Michigan at Detroit Athletic Club

Team	1	2	Total
• Michigan	18	8	26
Detroit Athletic Club	0	0	0

- Date: October 14
- Location: Detroit Athletic Club, Detroit
- Game attendance: 150

On October 14, Michigan again defeated Deltas, this time by a more dominant 26–0 score. The game began at 4:25 p.m. and was played in the rain, on a muddy field, and before a small crowd of approximately 150 persons at the Detroit Athletic Club grounds in Detroit. Michigan scored four touchdowns in the first half, and George Dygert kicked one goal from touchdown to give Michigan an 18-0 lead at halftime. Herman Leonard and Willard W. Griffin each scored two touchdowns in the half, including a 20-yard run by Leonard. Leonard and Griffin each scored another touchdown in the second half. Michigan's lineup in the game was Gustave Ferbert (left end), Henry M. Senter (left tackle), Frederick W. Henninger (left guard), C. H. Smith (center), W.W. Griffin (right guard), William I. Aldrich (right tackle), Mason (maybe Marsten) (right end), James Baird (quarterback), Leonard (left halfback), Raynor Freund (right halfback), and Dygert (fullback).

=== Game 3: at Chicago ===
On October 21, Michigan lost to Chicago by a 10–6 score on the grounds at 57th Street and Ellis Avenue in Chicago. Michigan's touchdown was scored by George Dygert, and W. W. Griffin kicked the goal from touchdown.

Michigan's lineup against Chicago was Gustave Ferbert (left end), Henry M. Senter (left tackle), W. W. Griffin (left guard), C. H. Smith (center), Frederick W. Henninger (right guard), Frank Villa (right tackle), Hayes (right end), James Baird (quarterback), Grosh and Paul (left halfback), Raynor Freund (right halfback), and Dygert (fullback).

=== Game 4: Minnesota ===
Minnesota at Michigan

Team	1	2	Total
• Minnesota	16	14	30
Michigan	10	10	20

- Date: October 28
- Location: Regents Field, Ann Arbor, MI
- Game attendance: 1,000

On October 28, Michigan lost to Minnesota, 30–24. The game began at 3:00 p.m. and was played in front of 1,000 spectators at Regents Field in Ann Arbor. Michigan's left halfback Raynor Freund scored two touchdowns, one on a 60-yard run around left end, and Hooper and Aldrich each scored one. Bartlett, a former Princeton player, started at right halfback for Michigan, but was injured and carried from the field. Dygert kicked at least one of the goals after touchdown for Michigan. Right halfback Southworth starred for Minnesota, scoring at least three touchdowns. The U. of M. Daily praised Minnesota for its excellent interference and "exceedingly strong" line.

When news of the victory reached the Minnesota campus, students there celebrated around a huge bonfire on the campus, executed "joyous gyrations", and toured the city, including a stop at the home of President Northrop.

Michigan's lineup against Minnesota was Ferbert (left end), Aldrich (left tackle), W. Griffin (left guard), C. H. Smith (center), Frederick W. Henninger (right guard), Hooper (right tackle), Roger Sherman (right end), James Baird (quarterback) (quarterback), Raynor Freund (left halfback), Bartell (right halfback), and George Dygert (fullback).

=== Game 5: Wisconsin ===
Wisconsin at Michigan

Team	1	2	Total
• Wisconsin	18	16	34
Michigan	10	8	18

- Date: November 4
- Location: Regents Field, Ann Arbor, MI

On November 4, Michigan lost to Wisconsin by a 34–18 score at Regents Field in Ann Arbor. Michigan's captain George Dygert was unable to play due to injury. Baird served as captain for the game. W.W. Griffin scored three touchdown and kicked a goal from touchdown. Gustave Ferbert scored a touchdown. Wisconsin scored six touchdowns and kicked five goals from touchdown.

Michigan's lineup against Wisconsin was George Greenleaf (left end), W. W. Griffin (left tackle), James H. Hooper (left guard), C. H. Smith (center), Frederick W. Henninger (right guard), Frank Villa (right tackle), Roger Sherman (right end), James Baird (quarterback and captain), Gustave Ferbert (left halfback), Raynor Freund (right halfback), and Horace Dyer (fullback).

=== Game 6: at Purdue ===
Michigan at Purdue

Team	1	2	Total
• Michigan	22	24	46
Purdue	0	8	8

- Date: November 11
- Location: Stuart Field, Lafayette, IN
- Game attendance: 2,000

On November 11, Michigan defeated Purdue by a 46–8 score. The game began at 2:35 p.m. and was played before a crowd of 2,000 persons at Stuart Field in Lafayette, Indiana. A large number of Michigan alumni attended the game wearing blue and yellow. W. W. Griffin scored four touchdowns. Additional Michigan touchdowns were scored by Horace Dyer, Frank Villa, Frederick W. Henninger, and Gustave Ferbert. Buschman and Olin scored touchdowns for Purdue.

Michigan's lineup against Purdue was Ferbert (left end), W. W. Griffin (left tackle), James H. Hooper (left guard), C. H. Smith (center), Henninger (right guard), Villa (right tackle), Aldrich (right end), James Baird (quarterback), Dyer (left halfback), Raynor Freund and Henry M. Senter (right halfback), and George Dygert (fullback).

=== Game 7: at DePauw ===
Michigan at DePauw

Team	1	2	Total
• Michigan	20	14	34
DePauw	0	0	0

- Date: November 13
- Location: Greencastle, IN

On Monday, November 13, Michigan defeated DePauw by a 34–0 score at Greencastle, Indiana. Michigan's captain George Dygert did not play due to tonsilitis. The game was 40 minutes in length. Head coach Frank Barbour, playing at right halfback, and Gustave Ferbert, playing at left halfback, each scored two touchdowns for Michigan. James H. Hooper, Frank Villa, and Willard W. Griffin each scored one touchdown. Barbour also kicked two goals from touchdown, and Griffin kicked one.

Michigan's lineup against DePauw was Henry M. Senter (left end), Hooper (left tackle), Griffin (left guard), C. H. Smith (center), Frederick W. Henninger (right guard), Villa (right tackle), William I. Aldrich (right end), James Baird (quarterback), Ferbert (left halfback), Barbour (right halfback), and Horace Dyer (fullback).

The victory over DePauw concluded a successful trip to Indiana. The team returned to Ann Arbor at noon on Tuesday, November 14, and were welcomed by an enthusiastic crowd of admirers at the train depot.

=== Game 8: Northwestern ===
Northwestern at Michigan

Team	1	2	Total
Northwestern	6	0	6
• Michigan	34	38	72

- Date: November 18
- Location: Regents Field, Ann Arbor, MI
- Game attendance: 800

On November 18, Michigan defeated Northwestern, 72–6, at Regents Field in Ann Arbor. The game was played in 30-minute halves. Michigan scored 12 touchdowns (48 points). Fullback George Dygert scored 42 points in the game on five touchdowns (20 points) and 11 kicks for goal from touchdown (22 points). Michigan also added two points on a safety. Gustave Ferbert and Frank Villa each scored two touchdowns, and additional Michigan touchdowns were scored by Willard W. Griffin, James H. Hooper, and James L. Morrison.

George Jewett scored Northwestern's only touchdown. Jewett had previously played for Michigan and was the first African-American to play football for both Michigan and Northwestern.

Michigan's lineup against Northwestern was Henry M. Senter (left end), Griffin (left tackle), Hooper (left guard), C. H. Smith (center), Frederick W. Henninger (right guard), Villa (right tackle), William I. Aldrich (right end), James Baird (quarterback), Ferbert (left halfback), Horace Dyer (right halfback), and Dygert (fullback).

=== Game 9: vs. Kansas ===
Michigan vs. Kansas

Team	1	2	Total
• Michigan	6	22	28
Kansas	0	0	0

- Date: November 25
- Location: Fairmount Oval, Kansas City, MO
- Game attendance: 3,000

On November 25, Michigan defeated Kansas, 22–0. The game was played before 3,000 spectators, including 500 students who traveled from Kansas, at the Fairmount Oval in Kansas City, Missouri. Left tackle W. W. Griffin scored Michigan's first touchdown and kicked two goals from touchdown. Right halfback John W. Hollister scored three touchdowns.

After the game, the Michigan team was entertained in a private box at the Ninth Street Theatre and later at the Kansas City Club.

Michigan's lineup against Kansas was Henry M. Senter (left end), W. W. Griffin (left tackle), Hooper (left guard), Smith (center), Frederick W. Henninger (right guard), Frank Villa (right tackle), Aldrich (right end), James Baird (quarterback), Horace Dyer (left halfback), Hollister (right halfback), and George Dygert (fullback).

=== Game 10: at Chicago ===
Michigan at Chicago

Team	1	2	Total
• Michigan	18	10	28
Chicago	0	10	10

- Date: November 30
- Location: Marshall Field, Chicago
- Game attendance: 3,500

On Thanksgiving Day, November 30, Michigan defeated Chicago by a 28–10 score before a crowd of 3,500 persons at Marshall Field in Chicago. Michigan captain George Dygert remained injured and unable to play; quarterback James Baird served as captain in his place. The game began at 11:23 a.m. with the two coaches, Frank Barbour and Amos Alonzo Stagg, serving as referee and umpire in the first half and reversing roles for the second half. Michigan scored first when Frank Villa was pushed by his teammates across the goal line "by sheer beef and brawn". W. W. Griffin kicked the goal, and Michigan led, 6–0. Michigan's second touchdown was scored by Griffin, who was also pushed across the goal line by his teammates. Griffin again kicked the goal, and Michigan led, 12–0. Villa then scored another touchdown, and Griffin again kicked the goal. Michigan led, 18–0, at halftime.

In the second half, John W. Hollister made a 40-yard run around right end for Michigan's fourth touchdown. Griffin again kicked goal. After Michigan took a 24–0 lead, Chicago scored two touchdowns and cut the lead to 24–10. Roger Sherman then recovered a Chicago fumble and returned it for Michigan's fifth touchdown. Griffin failed to kick the goal, and Michigan led, 28–10.

Michigan's lineup against Chicago was George Greenleaf (right end), Frank Villa (right tackle), Frederick W. Henninger (right guard), C. H. Smith (center), James Hooper (left guard), W. W. Griffin (left tackle), Henry M. Senter (left end), Baird (quarterback), Hollister (right halfback), Gustave Ferbert (left halfback), and Horace Dyer (fullback).

== Personnel ==
=== Varsity letter winners ===
Player	Position	Games started	Hometown	Height	Weight
William Irving Aldrich	Tackle	RE (4), RT (2), LT (1),	Coldwater, Michigan	5' 10"	175
James Baird	Quarterback	QB (10)	Chicago, Illinois	5' 6"	145
Arthur C. Bartels	Halfback	None	Wilton Center, Illinois	5' 10"	170
Horace Dyer	Halfback	FB (3), LHB (2), RHB (1)	St. Louis, Missouri	5' 11"	175
George Dygert	Halfback	FB (7)	Ann Arbor, Michigan	5' 4"	160
Gustave Ferbert	End	LE (5), LHB (4)	Cleveland, Ohio	5' 7½"	140
Raynor Spalding Freund	Halfback	RHB (4), LHB (2)	Reserve, Montana	5' 6½"	134
George Greenleaf	Quarterback	LE (1), RE (1)	Brazil, Indiana	5' 6"	130
Charles T. Griffin	Tackle	C (1)	Kingsbury, Indiana	5' 8"	175
Willard Wilmer Griffin	Center	LT (5), LG (4), RG (1)	Wenona, Illinois	5' 9½	165
Lawrence C. Grosh	Halfback	LHB (1)	Toledo, Ohio	5' 9"	150
Ralph W. Hayes	End	RE (2)	Galva, Illinois	6' 1½"	187
Frederick W. Henninger	Guard	RG (9), LG (1)	Barberton, Ohio	5' 10½"	175
John W. Hollister	Halfback	RHB (2)	Beloit, Wisconsin	5' 8"	163
James H. Hooper	Guard	LG (5), RT (1), LT (1)	Butte, Montana	6' 2½"	210
Heman B. Leonard	Halfback	LHB (1)	Bloomington, Illinois	5' 8"	155
James L. Morrison	Tackle	None	Morrisonville, Illinois	5' 11"	170
Louis P. Paul	Halfback	None	Massillon, Ohio	5' 11"	160
Henry M. Senter	End	LE (4), LT (2)	Houghton, Michigan	5' 11"	157
Roger Sherman	End	RE (2)	Chicago, Illinois	5' 7"	145
C.H. Smith	Center	C (9)		5' 10	230
Giovanni R. "Count" Villa	Tackle	RT (7)	Walla Walla, Washington	5' 7"	195

=== Others ===
- George Jason Cadwell, Chicago, Illinois
- Harry Hadden, Chicago, Illinois
- George A. Marston, Bay City, Michigan
- Edwin Andrew Murbach
- John Whitcome Reynolds, Detroit
- Edward James Ryan, Detroit
- James W. Van Dusen, Cleveland, Ohio

=== Coaching and training staff ===
- Coach: Frank Barbour
- Trainer: Edward Moulton
- Manager: Charles A. Baird
- Assistant manager: Eugene Batavia
