= Frank Villa =

American football player, judge, and consular official (1873–1933)

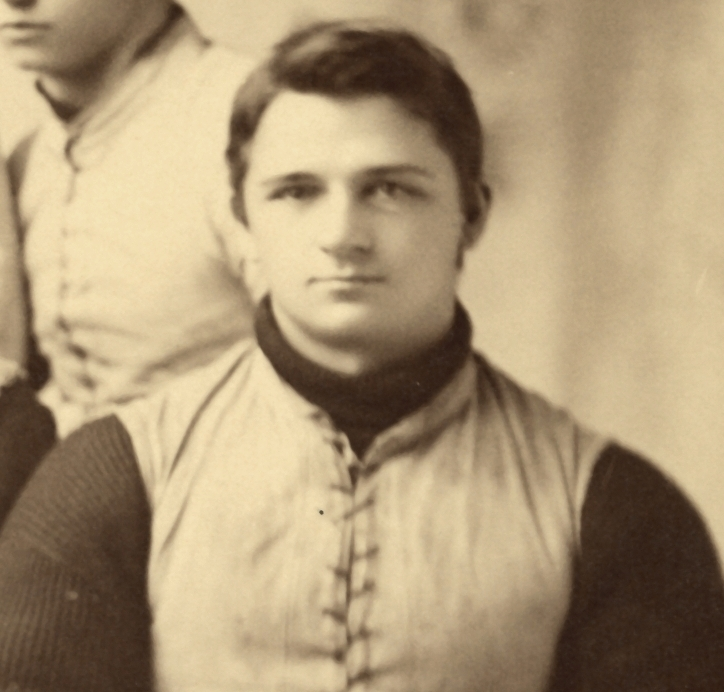
- Villa cropped from 1893 Michigan Wolverines football team portrait

Profile
- Position: Tackle

Personal information
- Born: January 29, 1873; Oregon, U.S.
- Died: November 12, 1933 (aged 60); Watertown, Wisconsin, U.S.
- Listed height: 5 ft 7 in (1.70 m)
- Listed weight: 195 lb (88 kg)

Career information
- College: Whitman (1893); Michigan (1893–1896)

Awards and highlights
- All-Western (1895)

Giovanni Raphael Frank Villa (January 29, 1873 – November 12, 1933), also known as "Count Villa" or "the Count," was an American football player, judge, and consular official. He played college football for Whitman College in 1893 and for the University of Michigan from 1893 to 1896. He was selected as a first-team All-Western player in 1895. He later became a consular official for Italy, a judge and gold prospector in Alaska, and a representative of the Great Northern Railroad. He also served in the U. S. Army during World War I.

== Early life ==
Villa was born in Oregon in 1873. His father, Frank Villa Sr., was an immigrant from Genoa, Italy. His mother, Mary (Reible) Villa was an immigrant from Switzerland. Villa had four sisters, Mamie, Amelia, Harriet and Eleanor. In November 1878, the family relocated to 35-acre farm in Walla Walla, Washington. The family raised fruits and vegetables on the farm, selling their produce to local markets.

Villa enrolled at Whitman College in Walla Walla. While attending Whitman, he played on the college's first football team. The college's first football game took place on February 22, 1893, against a team of locals from Walla Walla. Whitman won the game, 16–0. An account of the game written years later emphasized Villa's impact: "The notable player on this team was Frank Villa, or Count Villa, as he was popularly known."

== University of Michigan ==
In the fall of 1893, Villa enrolled in law school at the University of Michigan. He received his Bachelor of Law degree in 1896. While attending law school, and during one year of post-graduate legal studies, he played for the Michigan Wolverines football team from 1893 to 1896. During those years, the Michigan football program rose to prominence. After compiling an 11–9 record in the two years before Villa arrived, the Wolverines improved steadily and compiled a 33–6–1 during the four years that Villa was a starter. The team improved to 7–3 in 1893 and lost only one game each year in 1894, 1895, and 1896.

During the 1894 season, Villa was a key player on the Michigan team that compiled a 9–1–1 record and defeated Cornell, marking "the first time in collegiate football history that a western school defeated an established power from the east". Despite playing at the tackle position, he was one of the team's most reliable ball carriers and scored two touchdowns against Olivet College on October 17, 1894. Several weeks later, a game against Oberlin College drew the largest crowd in the history of Regents Field up to that time. Villa ran 40 yards for a touchdown against Oberlin and drew praise from the Detroit Free Press: "Villa was particularly good and did brilliant work on the offense and defense."

Villa continued to be a key player and ball carrier for the 1895 team. He scored two touchdowns against Western Reserve and another against Oberlin. In the 1896 University of Michigan yearbook, team captain Edwin Denby credited Villa for his efforts in a 12–10 victory over Purdue: "It was exhilerating [sic] to note how when Villa took the ball and plunged through the Purdue line as the beautiful lady in the circus jumps through paper hoops, the rest of the Michigan men slouched down the field, crushing and driving everything before them by sheer muscle and determination." At the end of the 1895 season, Villa was selected as a first-team All-Western player by Chicago's Daily Inter Ocean. In announcing its selection of Villa, the newspaper wrote: "Villa is the best tackle of this season, as he was of last. His immense strength and weight, added to his cleverness and agility, make him a powerful man."

Despite receiving his law degree in the spring of 1896, Villa undertook post-graduate legal studies and returned to play on the 1896 football team. In September 1896, the Chicago Daily Tribune wrote: "Frank Villa will be in his old position at left tackle. The 'Count,' as he is generally called, is one of the greatest ground gainers in the West and plays a good defensive game." He scored two touchdowns in an early victory over the College of Physicians and Surgeons in Chicago and was credited with brilliant work against Lehigh.

In November 1896, Henry Senter resigned as the team's captain due to injury and illness, and Villa was elected to replace him as team captain. In December 1896, the Detroit Journal published an account of a sleigh accident in which Villa was thrown 33 feet and landed on his head, but suffered no injuries. The story described Villa as "Ann Arbor's most famous football player" and joked that "it makes one's blood run cold to think what might have happened had he fallen on his feet."

Following his death in 1933, a Michigan alumnus in the Chicago Daily Tribune recalled Villa this way:

All but forgotten by present day Michigan rooters, he was one of the giants of an earlier pre-Yost Wolverine era. What a tackle he was! He weighed well over 200 pounds and was built like a water tank. He was a star of the Harvard-Michigan game at Cambridge in 1895 which Harvard won 4 to 0. . . . Swaggering down the street in a heavy blue turtleneck varsity sweater of the day, he was held in great awe by the freshmen, of whom I was one, and he returned their timid salutes with his characteristic grin.

Villa returned to Ann Arbor during the 1897 and 1898 football seasons and served as an assistant coach under his former teammate, Gustave Ferbert. The 1898 team was undefeated and won Michigan's first Western Conference football championship.

== Later life ==
In August 1897, Villa traveled for the first time to Alaska. He lived there for parts of the next several years. At the time of the 1900 United States census, he was living in Nome, Alaska. From 1899 to 1901, he traveled between Alaska and his home in Walla Walla, Washington. While living in Alaska, Villa served for a time as a judge. A newspaper story in May 1900 indicated that his former Michigan teammates, Gustave Ferbert and William "High" Allen, were joining Villa in Alaska to prospect in the Nome gold fields.

While living in Walla Walla, Villa was a member of the Washington Fruit and Produce Company and served as a college football official. In September 1901, Villa married Mary McCabe. He also served as an assistant football coach at Washington Agricultural College (now known as Washington State University) in the fall of 1901 under head coach William Namack.

In 1904 and 1905, he served for a time as the Italian consular agent at Seattle. His fruit business eventually failed, and Villa began working as a railroad contractor.

During World War I, Villa served as a lieutenant in the U.S. Army, Company A of the 22nd Engineers. He served from August 5, 1918, until August 14, 1919.

After the war, Villa reportedly worked as a customs agent for the Great Northern Railroad. At the time of the 1920 United States census, Villa was living in Medina, Washington, with his wife Mary and daughter Celine (age 14). His employment was listed as an assistant agent for the railroad. At the time of the 1930 United States census, Villa was still living in Medina, and his employment was listed as a dock master's assistant for the railroad.

Villa and his wife travelled to Milwaukee, Wisconsin in approximately 1931 to visit their daughter, Mrs. Herbert J. Steffes. In November 1931, Villa was stricken with heart disease and was admitted to the U.S. National Home for Disabled Volunteer Soldiers in Milwaukee. He was transferred to the Veteran's Hospital at Watertown, Wisconsin, on October 15, 1933. He died there on November 12, 1933, at age 60. The cause of death was listed as myocarditis.
