= 1893 Wisconsin Badgers football team =

American college football season

1893 Wisconsin Badgers football
- Conference: Intercollegiate Athletic Association of the Northwest
- Record: 4–2 (1–1 IAANW)
- Head coach: Parke H. Davis (1st season)
- Captain: Theron Lyman
- Home stadium: Randall Field

1893 Intercollegiate Athletic Association of the Northwest football standings
	Conf.					Overall
Team	W		L		T	W		L		T
Minnesota $	3	–	0	–	0	6	–	0	–	0
Wisconsin	1	–	1	–	0	4	–	2	–	0
Michigan	1	–	2	–	0	7	–	3	–	0
Northwestern	0	–	2	–	0	2	–	5	–	3
$ – Conference champion

The 1893 Wisconsin Badgers football team represented the University of Wisconsin as a member of the Intercollegiate Athletic Association of the Northwest (IAANW) during the 1893 college football season. Led by Parke H. Davis in his first and only season as head coach, the Badgers compiled an overall record of 4–2 with a mark of 1–1 in conference playing, placing second in the IAANW. The team's captain was Theron Lyman.

== Schedule ==
Date	Opponent	Site	Result	Attendance	Source
October 14	vs. Chicago Athletic Association*	Athletic Park; Milwaukee, WI	L 0–22		
October 21	Lake Forest*	Randall Field; Madison, WI	W 24–0		
October 28	Beloit*	Randall Field; Madison, WI	W 18–0		
November 4	at Michigan	Regents Field; Ann Arbor, MI	W 34–18	1,000	
November 11	at Minnesota	Athletic Park; Minneapolis, MN (rivalry)	L 0–40		
November 16	Purdue*	Randall Field; Madison, WI	W 36–30		
*Non-conference game
