= 1893 Northwestern Purple football team =

American college football season

1893 Northwestern Purple football
- Conference: Intercollegiate Athletic Association of the Northwest
- Record: 2–5–3 (0–2 IAANW)
- Head coach: Paul Noyes (1st season)
- Captain: Frank Griffith

1893 Intercollegiate Athletic Association of the Northwest football standings
	Conf.					Overall
Team	W		L		T	W		L		T
Minnesota $	3	–	0	–	0	6	–	0	–	0
Wisconsin	1	–	1	–	0	4	–	2	–	0
Michigan	1	–	2	–	0	7	–	3	–	0
Northwestern	0	–	2	–	0	2	–	5	–	3
$ – Conference champion

The 1893 Northwestern Purple team represented Northwestern University during the 1893 college football season. In their first and only year under head coach Paul Noyes, the Purple compiled a 2–5–3 record.

== Schedule ==
Date	Opponent	Site	Result	Attendance	Source
October 4	vs. Denver Athletic Club*	World's Fair Stock Pavilion; Chicago, IL	L 0–8		
October 18	at Chicago*	Marshall Field; Chicago, IL	L 6–12		
October 21	Illinois *	Evanston, IL (rivalry)	T 0–0		
October 27	Lake Forest*	Evanston, IL	T 12–12		
October 30	Minnesota	Evanston, IL	L 0–16		
November 4	Beloit*	Evanston, IL	W 10–6		
November 8	Chicago*	Evanston, IL	T 6–6		
November 11	Lake Forest*	Evanston, IL	W 38–22		
November 18	at Michigan	Regents Field; Ann Arbor, MI (rivalry)	L 6–72	800	
December 16	vs. Chicago*	Tattersall's Pavilion; Chicago, IL	L 14–22		
*Non-conference game
