= 1893 Chicago Athletic Association football team =

American football team season

1893 Chicago Athletic Association football
- League: Independent
- Record: 8–0
- Manager: Harry Cornish (1st year)
- Captain: Herbert Alward
- Home field: World's Fair Stock Pavilion and South Side Park

The 1893 Chicago Athletic Association football team represented the Chicago Athletic Association, or C. A. A., during the 1893 college football season. In Harry Cornish's first year as manager of the athletic club, CAA compiled an undefeated 8–0 record, and outscored their opponents 90 to 8. The team played its home games on Chicago's South Side: four at the World's Fair Stock Pavilion in Jackson Park and one at South Side Park (II).

== Schedule ==
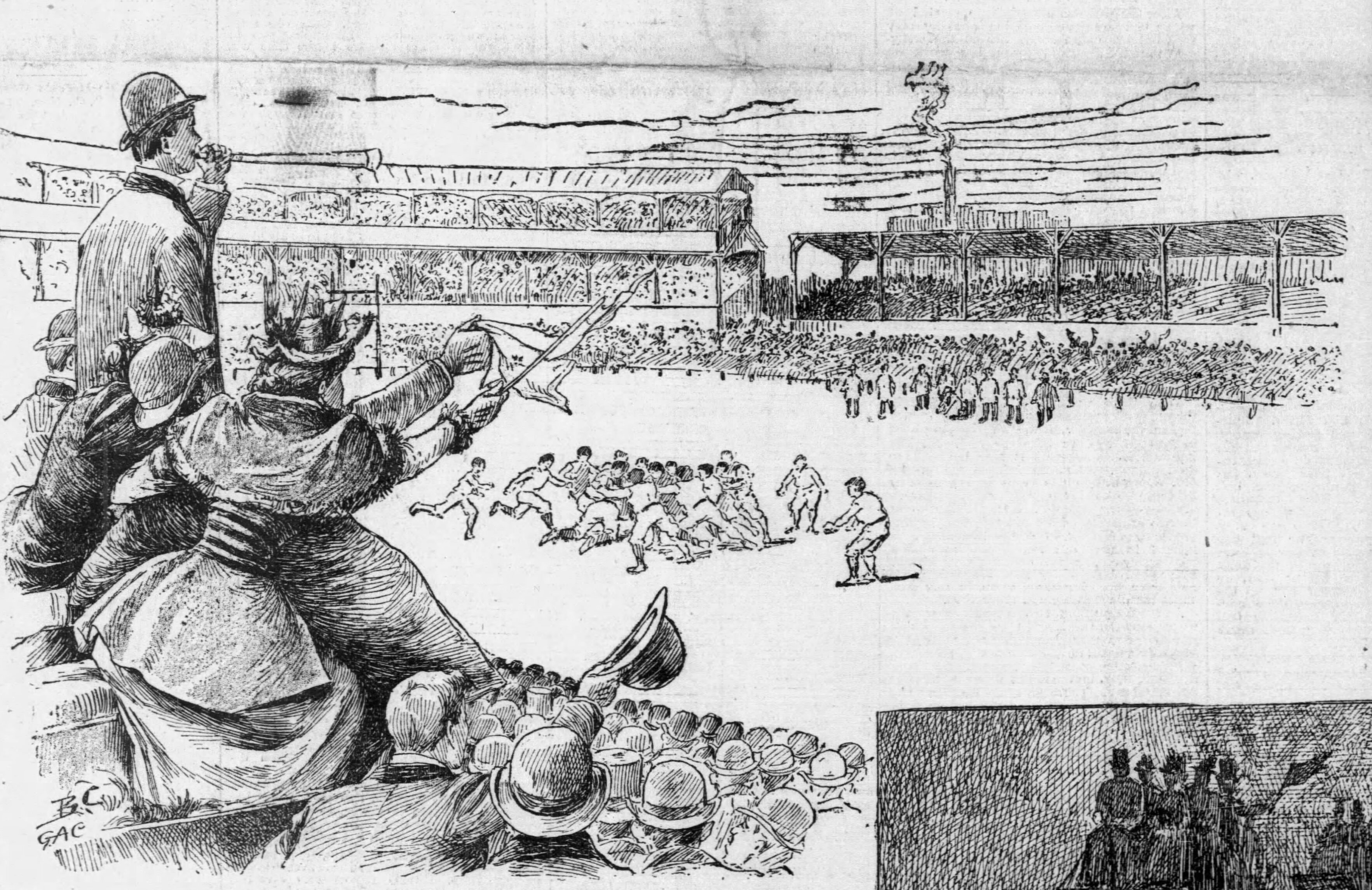
Chicago Tribune sketch of the November 30 game against Boston Athletic Association at South Side Park

Date	Time	Opponent	Site	Result	Source
August 26	9:20 p.m.	West Point "picked" team	World's Fair Stock Pavilion; Chicago, IL	W 14–0	(Note: One of the first night games in football history. The West Point band made the trip to Chicago to perform for onlookers in a highly social event at the 1893 Chicago World' Fair.)
September 9		Detroit Athletic Club	World's Fair Stock Pavilion; Chicago, IL	W 16–0	
September 18		New York Athletic Club	World's Fair Stock Pavilion; Chicago, IL	W 6–0	
October 3		Denver Athletic Club	World's Fair Stock Pavilion; Chicago, IL	W 10–0	
October 14		vs. Wisconsin	Athletic Park; Milwaukee, WI	W 22–0	
October 18		at Boston Athletic Association	Boston, MA	Cancelled	
October 21		Beloit	Beloit, WI	Cancelled	
October 28		at Illinois	Illinois Field; Champaign, IL	W 10–4	
November 4		at Allegheny Athletic Association	AAA Park; Allegheny, PA	W 4–0	
November 11		vs. Kansas	Kansas City, MO	Cancelled	
November 25		Missouri	Chicago, IL	Cancelled	
November 25		at Minnesota	Minneapolis, MN	Cancelled	(Note: The game was cancelled because the Minnesota team had disbanded for the season.)
November 30		Boston Athletic Association	South Side Park; Chicago, IL	W 8–4	
