= List of United States Supreme Court cases, volume 202 =

Supreme Court of the United States
- Interactive map of Supreme Court of the United States
- 38°53′26″N 77°00′16″W
- Established: March 4, 1789; 236 years ago
- Location: Washington, D.C.
- Coordinates: 38°53′26″N 77°00′16″W
- Composition method: Presidential nomination with Senate confirmation
- Authorised by: Constitution of the United States, Art. III, § 1
- Judge term length: life tenure, subject to impeachment and removal
- Number of positions: 9 (by statute)
- Website: supremecourt.gov

This is a list of cases reported in volume 202 of United States Reports, decided by the Supreme Court of the United States in 1906.

== Justices of the Supreme Court at the time of volume 202 U.S. ==
The Supreme Court is established by Article III, Section 1 of the Constitution of the United States, which says: "The judicial Power of the United States, shall be vested in one supreme Court . . .". The size of the Court is not specified; the Constitution leaves it to Congress to set the number of justices. Under the Judiciary Act of 1789 Congress originally fixed the number of justices at six (one chief justice and five associate justices). Since 1789 Congress has varied the size of the Court from six to seven, nine, ten, and back to nine justices (always including one chief justice).

When the cases in volume 202 were decided the Court comprised the following nine members:

Portrait	Justice	Office	Home State	Succeeded	Date confirmed by the Senate (Vote)	Tenure on Supreme Court
	Melville Fuller	Chief Justice	Illinois	Morrison Waite	July 20, 1888 (41–20)	October 8, 1888 – July 4, 1910 (Died)
	John Marshall Harlan	Associate Justice	Kentucky	David Davis	November 29, 1877 (Acclamation)	December 10, 1877 – October 14, 1911 (Died)
	David Josiah Brewer	Associate Justice	Kansas	Stanley Matthews	December 18, 1889 (53–11)	January 6, 1890 – March 28, 1910 (Died)
	Henry Billings Brown	Associate Justice	Michigan	Samuel Freeman Miller	December 29, 1890 (Acclamation)	January 5, 1891 – May 28, 1906 (Retired)
	Edward Douglass White	Associate Justice	Louisiana	Samuel Blatchford	February 19, 1894 (Acclamation)	March 12, 1894 – December 18, 1910 (Continued as chief justice)
	Rufus W. Peckham	Associate Justice	New York	Howell Edmunds Jackson	December 9, 1895 (Acclamation)	January 6, 1896 – October 24, 1909 (Died)
	Joseph McKenna	Associate Justice	California	Stephen Johnson Field	January 21, 1898 (Acclamation)	January 26, 1898 – January 5, 1925 (Retired)
	Oliver Wendell Holmes Jr.	Associate Justice	Massachusetts	Horace Gray	December 4, 1902 (Acclamation)	December 8, 1902 – January 12, 1932 (Retired)
	William R. Day	Associate Justice	Ohio	George Shiras Jr.	February 23, 1903 (Acclamation)	March 2, 1903 – November 13, 1922 (Retired)

== Citation style ==
Under the Judiciary Act of 1789 the federal court structure at the time comprised District Courts, which had general trial jurisdiction; Circuit Courts, which had mixed trial and appellate (from the US District Courts) jurisdiction; and the United States Supreme Court, which had appellate jurisdiction over the federal District and Circuit courts—and for certain issues over state courts. The Supreme Court also had limited original jurisdiction (i.e., in which cases could be filed directly with the Supreme Court without first having been heard by a lower federal or state court). There were one or more federal District Courts and/or Circuit Courts in each state, territory, or other geographical region.

The Judiciary Act of 1891 created the United States Courts of Appeals and reassigned the jurisdiction of most routine appeals from the district and circuit courts to these appellate courts. The Act created nine new courts that were originally known as the "United States Circuit Courts of Appeals." The new courts had jurisdiction over most appeals of lower court decisions. The Supreme Court could review either legal issues that a court of appeals certified or decisions of court of appeals by writ of certiorari.

Bluebook citation style is used for case names, citations, and jurisdictions.

- "# Cir." = United States Court of Appeals
  - e.g., "3d Cir." = United States Court of Appeals for the Third Circuit
- "C.C.D." = United States Circuit Court for the District of . . .
  - e.g.,"C.C.D.N.J." = United States Circuit Court for the District of New Jersey
- "D." = United States District Court for the District of . . .
  - e.g.,"D. Mass." = United States District Court for the District of Massachusetts
- "E." = Eastern; "M." = Middle; "N." = Northern; "S." = Southern; "W." = Western
  - e.g.,"C.C.S.D.N.Y." = United States Circuit Court for the Southern District of New York
  - e.g.,"M.D. Ala." = United States District Court for the Middle District of Alabama
- "Ct. Cl." = United States Court of Claims
- The abbreviation of a state's name alone indicates the highest appellate court in that state's judiciary at the time.
  - e.g.,"Pa." = Supreme Court of Pennsylvania
  - e.g.,"Me." = Supreme Judicial Court of Maine

== List of cases in volume 202 U.S. ==
Case Name	Page & year	Opinion of the Court	Concurring opinion(s)	Dissenting opinion(s)	Lower Court	Disposition
Louisiana v. Mississippi I	1 (1906)	Fuller	none	none	original	decree for La.
Louisiana v. Mississippi II	58 (1906)	per curiam	none	none	original	decree for La.
Iowa v. Illinois	59 (1906)	per curiam	none	none	original	boundary set
Oregon v. Hitchcock	60 (1906)	Brewer	none	none	original	dismissed
Hazelton v. Sheckells	71 (1906)	Holmes	none	none	D.C. Cir.	affirmed
Perez v. Fernandez	80 (1906)	Day	none	White	D.P.R.	reversed
United States v. Cherokee Nation	101 (1906)	Fuller	none	none	Ct. Cl.	affirmed
Whitney v. Dick	132 (1906)	Brewer	none	none	9th Cir.	reversed
First Nat'l Bank v. Staake	141 (1906)	Brown	none	none	4th Cir.	affirmed
McHarg v. Staake	150 (1906)	per curiam	none	none	4th Cir.	affirmed
Sawyer v. United States	150 (1906)	Peckham	none	none	C.C.E.D.N.C.	affirmed
United States v. Milliken I. Co.	168 (1906)	Holmes	none	none	Ct. Cl.	reversed
In re Lincoln	178 (1906)	Brewer	none	none	D. Neb.	habeas corpus denied
United States v. Cornell S.B. Co.	184 (1906)	Brown	none	none	2d Cir.	affirmed
Darlington v. Turner	195 (1906)	White	none	none	D.C. Cir.	reversed
Texas & P. Ry. Co. v. Mugg	242 (1906)	White	none	none	Tex. App.	reversed
Security M.L. Ins. Co. v. Prewitt	246 (1906)	Peckham	none	Day	Ky.	affirmed
Gila Bend R. & I. Co. v. Gila W. Co.	270 (1906)	McKenna	none	none	Sup. Ct. Terr. Ariz.	affirmed
Hulbert v. City of Chicago	275 (1906)	McKenna	none	none	Ill.	dismissed
Pearson v. Williams	281 (1906)	Holmes	none	none	2d Cir.	affirmed
Halsell v. Renfrow	287 (1906)	Holmes	none	none	Sup. Ct. Terr. Okla.	affirmed
Merchants' Nat'l Bank v. Wehrmann	295 (1906)	Holmes	none	none	Ohio	reversed
United States v. Dieckerhoff	302 (1906)	Day	none	none	2d Cir.	reversed
Devine v. City of Los Angeles	313 (1906)	Fuller	none	none	C.C.S.D. Cal.	affirmed
Ortega v. Lara	339 (1906)	Fuller	none	none	D.P.R.	dismissed
Burton v. United States	344 (1906)	Harlan	McKenna	Brewer	C.C.E.D. Mo.	affirmed
James v. United States	401 (1906)	White	none	none	Ct. Cl.	reversed
Ayer & L.T. Co. v. Kentucky	409 (1906)	White	none	none	Ky.	reversed
Millard v. Roberts	429 (1906)	McKenna	none	none	D.C. Cir.	affirmed
Santa Fe P.R.R. Co. v. Holmes	438 (1906)	McKenna	none	none	9th Cir.	affirmed
Cox v. Texas	446 (1906)	Holmes	none	Harlan	Tex. Civ. App.	affirmed
City of Vicksburg v. Vicksburg W. Co.	453 (1906)	Day	none	Harlan	C.C.S.D. Miss.	affirmed
Naganab v. Hitchcock	473 (1906)	Day	none	none	D.C. Cir.	affirmed
Bush v. Elliott	477 (1906)	Day	none	none	C.C.N.D. Ala.	reversed
Lincoln v. United States	484 (1906)	Fuller	none	White	multiple	reversed
O'Conor v. Texas	501 (1906)	Brewer	none	none	Tex.	affirmed
McDonald v. Dewey	510 (1906)	Brown	none	White	7th Cir.	multiple
McNeill v. Southern Ry. Co.	543 (1906)	White	none	none	C.C.E.D.N.C.	affirmed
United States v. American S.R. Co.	563 (1906)	McKenna	none	none	C.C.S.D.N.Y.	reversed
Franklin S.R. Co. v. United States	580 (1906)	McKenna	none	none	C.C.E.D. Pa.	affirmed
New York ex rel. New York et al. R.R. Co. v. Miller	584 (1906)	Holmes	none	none	N.Y. Sup. Ct.	affirmed
Missouri v. Illinois	598 (1906)	Holmes	none	none	original	costs to Ill.
McDermott v. Severe	600 (1906)	Day	none	none	D.C. Cir.	affirmed

== See also ==
- Certificate of division
