= Burton v. United States =

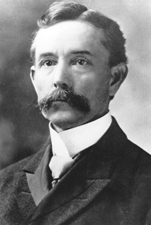
Sen. Burton

Burton v. United States is the name of two appeals to the Supreme Court of the United States by Senator Joseph R. Burton (R-KS) following his conviction for compensated representation of a party in a proceeding in which the United States was interested: Burton v. United States, 196 U.S. 283 (1905) and Burton v. United States, 202 U.S. 344 (1906). Burton was convicted of acting as counsel to Rialto Grain and Securities Company in the United States Postmaster General's investigation of Rialto for mail fraud.

On Burton's first appeal, the Supreme Court reversed his convictions because venue and vicinage could not be proper in the Eastern District of Missouri on the sole ground that Burton's bank sent the check to St. Louis after he cashed it. Further, the Court cited the prejudicial refusal of jury instructions. After Burton was retried and convicted, the Court affirmed, inter alia, on the ground that the agreement between Burton and Rialto had occurred in St. Louis.

Burton was the first defendant convicted under § 1782 of the Revised Statutes, 40 years after its 1864 enactment. Burton and his supporters argued that he was selectively prosecuted, on the orders of President Theodore Roosevelt, for political reasons. Burton also became the first member of the United States Senate to be convicted of public corruption, in fact the first member of the Senate to be convicted of any crime. The next year, Senator John H. Mitchell (R-OR) was convicted under the same statute for his role in the Oregon land fraud scandal.

== Background ==
=== Rialto Co.'s matter ===
In 1872, Congress created the crime of mail fraud. Rev. Stat. § 3929 authorized the United States Postmaster General, "upon evidence satisfactory to him" that mail fraud was being committed, to instruct the post master at the fraudster's local post office to return registered mail addressed to the fraudster to the sender with the word "Fraudulent" written or stamped on the envelope. In 1895, this authority was extended to all mail. Further, Rev. Stat. § 4041 authorized the Postmaster to also bar suspected fraudsters from cashing postal money orders.

The Rialto Grain and Securities Company, whose principal place of business was in St. Louis, Missouri, was under investigation by the Postmaster for mail fraud. The Postmaster had received two complaints and forwarded them for investigation on November 7, 1902. State courts were also investigating complaints from investors against Rialto. Hugh C. Dennis, the President of Rialto, and other officers had been criminally indicted, but (at the time of Burton's indictment) none had been convicted. As of Burton's indictment, Dennis had been once acquitted in federal court and four indictments were pending against him in state courts. For a time, Rialto's offices had been closed due to a judicial attachment by its creditors.

=== Burton's representation ===
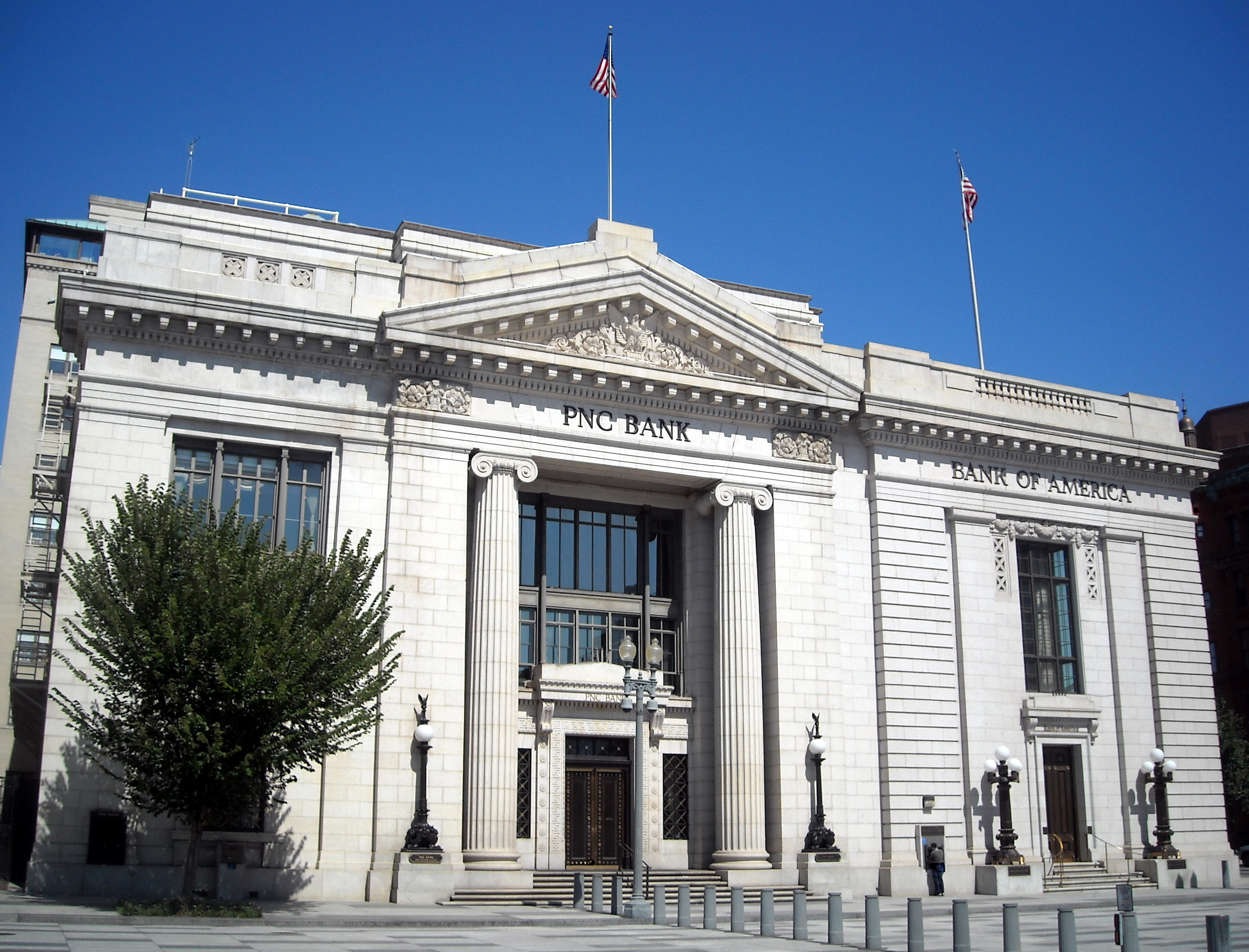
Burton deposited his checks at Riggs National Bank.

That same month—while the two were in Illinois, en route from St. Louis to Chicago—former state judge Thomas B. Harlan, the general counsel of Rialto, arranged to hire Senator Joseph R. Burton (R-KS), a lawyer, to appear before the Postmaster as counsel for Rialto in connection with these investigations for a monthly salary of $500. When the general counsel returned to St. Louis on November 18, he communicated Burton's offer to Rialto and Rialto accepted. Rialto notified Burton of its acceptance by telegram to him in Washington that same day.

Burton informed Rialto by mail that he had learned of the two complaints from the Postmaster, arranged for himself to be notified of any future complaints, and arranged to represent Rialto in a hearing before the Postmaster before any sanctions would issue. Burton continued to represent Rialto before the Postmaster, and draw his monthly salary, for five months. Burton's intervention was successful, and the Postmaster's investigation was ceased without the entry of a fraud order.

Rialto paid Burton by monthly checks for the first four months. Burton received the first check on November 22. Burton indorsed and deposited the checks at Riggs National Bank in Washington, D.C., which in turn sent the checks to Rialto's bank, the Commonwealth Trust Company in St. Louis, Missouri, for payment. The last $500 was paid in cash to Burton in person, at Rialto's office in St. Louis, on March 26, 1903, after which Burton's representation of Rialto terminated.

=== Indictment ===
A federal grand jury in the United States District Court for the Eastern District of Missouri was already investigating the Brooks Brokerage Company, with which Dennis, the President of Rialto, was associated. Witnesses against Burton at the grand jury included Chief Post Office Inspector William E. Cochran, Dennis, and W.B. Mehaney, the Vice President of Rialto. About two weeks before Burton's indictment, the grand jury came into possession of the checks from Rialto to Burton.

Burton was indicted on January 24, 1904, in the Eastern District of Missouri, on nine counts of violating Rev. Stat. § 1782. Section 1782 (enacted 1864) provided, in relevant part:

No Senator . . . after his election and during his continuance in office . . . shall receive or agree to receive any compensation whatever, directly or indirectly, for any services rendered, or to be rendered, to any person, either by himself or another, in relation to any proceeding . . . controversy . . . or other matter or thing in which the United States is a party, or directly or indirectly interested, before any Department . . . whatever. Every person offending against this section shall be deemed guilty of a misdemeanor, and shall be imprisoned not more than two years, and fined not more than ten thousand dollars, and shall, moreover, by conviction therefor, be rendered forever thereafter incapable of holding any office of honor, trust, or profit under the Government of the United States.

The first and second counts of the indictment pertained to the receipt of the final cash payment from Rialto with reference to two separate interests of the United States. The third count pertained to receipt of the final cash payment from Mahaney. The sixth, seventh, eighth, and ninth counts of the indictment pertained to the receipt of the four check for the first four months.

Burton arguably could not have been arrested at the time of his indictment because Congress was in session. Article One provides that senators and representatives "shall in all Cases, except Treason, Felony and Breach of the Peace, be privileged from Arrest during their Attendance at the Session of their respective Houses, and in going to and returning from the same." But, Burton voluntarily surrendered. On January 24, Burton and his wife departed for St. Louis.

=== Trial and conviction ===
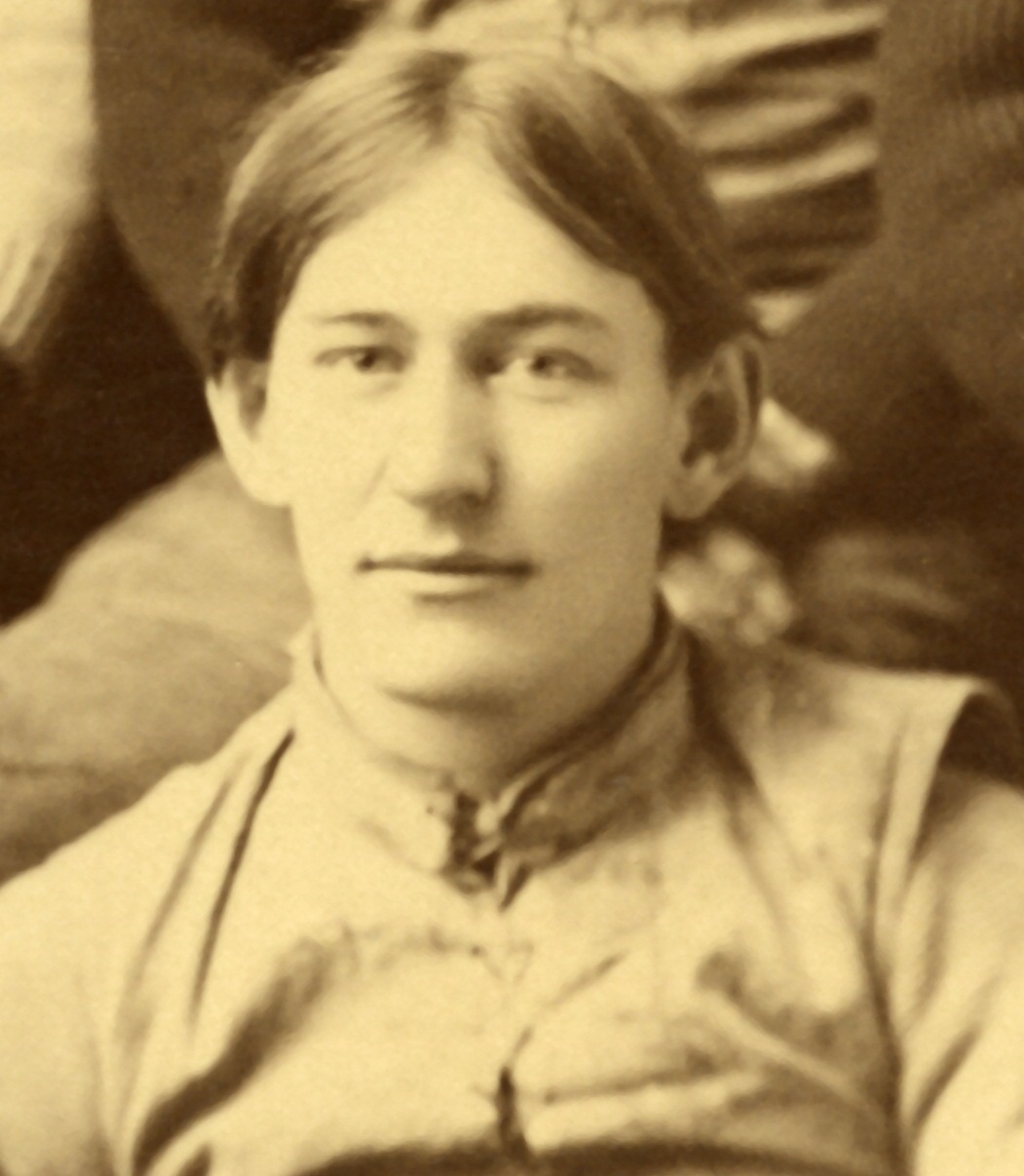
Assistant U.S. Attorney Horace Dyer prosecuted Burton at both trials.

Judge Elmer B. Adams, sitting as the United States Circuit Court for the Eastern District of Missouri, presided over Burton's trial. Former state judge Chester H. Krum appeared as Burton's attorney. Assistant U.S. Attorney Horace Dyer acted as prosecutor.

In his opening statement, Krum argued that Burton had only agreed to act as general counsel and to allow his name to be placed in Rialto's literature and that the agreement explicitly provided that Burton would never represent Rialto before any federal agency.

On March 23, the prosecution began its case in chief. Post Office Department employees identified the letters of complaint received against Rialto. Ernest H. Kastor, of a St. Louis advertising firm, testified that he introduced Burton to Dennis and Harlan in November 1902. Witnesses said that the agreement was as Krum described and that the pay was agreed as $2,500 in $500 installments. Dyer read into evidence the letter from Burton to Rialto.

The prosecution's case continued on March 24. Inspector Cochran testified that Burton had attempted to discuss the case with him the day his indictment was made public. Cochran refused to discuss it. Reporter J.H. Aubere testified that he had interviewed Burton that day and that Burton had denied practicing before the Post Office. Hector McRea, the Controller of Rialto, testified to a meeting between Mahaney and Burton, where Burton's representation was ended because the matter before the Post Office had concluded. Inspector Cochran was recalled to state that his conversation with Burton took place before Aubere's interview. Further, Cochran testified that, on February 5, 1902, Burton had told him that he wished to represent Rialto before the Department for a fee, having been assured by other senators that such conduct was common and legal. Burton also told Cochran that he needed to repay a disputed debt of $70,000. Finally, Mahaney testified that, on the day he personally paid Burton $500, Burton advised Rialto to destroy its correspondence with him and that two such letters were destroyed. Thereafter, the prosecution rested.

The defense case commenced on March 25. The third count of the indictment was quashed as duplicative with the first. Burton testified that he had accepted Rialto's employment due to personal financial reversals. Burton testified that his duties would include acting as a criminal defense attorney for Dennis, but would not include any activity in Washington. Burton testified that he received notice of his appointment from Harlan on November 20, 1902, and that he had only contacted the Post Office to notify them of his intent to defend Dennis in a criminal case. He explained that he only asked to be notified of complaints against Rialto so that he could terminate his association with them should any arise.

After the jury returned deadlocked 11-1, Judge Adams delivered an Allen charge. Soon afterwards, the jury returned a verdict that failed to address the third count in the indictment, so the Judge Allen ordered the jury to return to deliberations without reading the verdict. On March 28, 1904, after forty-one total hours of deliberation, the jury convicted Burton on five counts—counts one, two, six, eight, and nine—but acquitted on count three. Burton's convictions would have authorized a maximum sentence of 10 years imprisonment and a $50,000 fine.

Burton asked that the jury be polled, and each stated that the verdict was his own. Burton moved for a new trial. Judge Adams indicated that he would accept a supersedeas bond of $5,000, and Burton was not sentenced. Burton became the first defendant ever convicted under § 1782, more than 40 years after its enactment.

Burton had a right to appeal to the United States Court of Appeals for the Eighth Circuit, but instead opted for a direct appeal to the Supreme Court. On July 2, Judge Adams certified Burton's direct appeal on the grounds that Burton was convicted of an "infamous offense." Burton posted a $10,000 bond. On July 11, Justice Brewer allowed the direct appeal.

== Burton I (1905) ==
Burton v. United States
- Supreme Court of the United States

Argued November 30 – December 1, 1904 Decided January 16, 1905
- Full case name: Burton v. United States
- Citations: 196 U.S. 283 (more) 25 S. Ct. 243; 49 L. Ed. 482

Case history
- Prior: C.C.E.D. Mo.
- Subsequent: retrial after remand in C.C.E.D. Mo., affirmed, Burton v. United States, 202 U.S. 344 (1906), rehearing denied.

Holding
- (1) The indictment states an offense under Rev. Stat. § 1782 (2) The evidence was sufficient to prove an offense under § 1782 (3) The trial of the defendant in the Eastern District of Missouri based upon a bank's routing of a negotiable instrument to that district violates the venue provision of Article III and the Vicinage Clause of the Sixth Amendment (4) The refused jury instruction was prejudicial, warranting reversal

Court membership
- Chief Justice Melville Fuller Associate Justices John M. Harlan · David J. Brewer; Henry B. Brown · Edward D. White; Rufus W. Peckham · Joseph McKenna; Oliver W. Holmes Jr. · William R. Day

Case opinions
- Majority: Harlan, Brown, McKenna, Holmes, Day (no discussion)
- Majority: Peckham, joined by Fuller, Brewer, Brown, White, McKenna, Holmes, Day
- Dissent: Fuller, Peckham, Brewer, White (no discussion)
- Dissent: Harlan

Laws applied
- U.S. Const. art. III, § 2, cl. 3; U.S. Const. amend. VI; Rev. Stat. § 1782

Before the Supreme Court, on November 30 and December 1, 1904, Burton was represented by (former judge) John Forrest Dillon and (future Solicitor General) Frederick William Lehmann at oral argument, with Harry Hubbard and W.H. Rossington also on the brief. Solicitor General Henry M. Hoyt represented the United States.

On January 16, 1905, the Court overturned Burton's convictions.

=== Sufficiency of the indictment and the evidence ===
Without any discussion of the merits, 5-4, the Court held that the indictment stated offenses under § 1782 and that the evidence was sufficient for the jury to have convicted Burton. Justices Harlan, Brown, McKenna, Holmes, and Day were in the majority; Chief Justice Fuller, and Justices Peckham, Brewer, and White, were in dissent.

=== Venue and vicinage ===
Article III provides that: "The Trial of all Crimes, except in Cases of Impeachment, shall be by Jury; and such Trial shall be held in the State where the said Crimes shall have been committed." The Vicinage Clause of the Sixth Amendment provides that: "In all criminal prosecutions, the accused shall enjoy the right to a speedy and public trial, by an impartial jury of the State and district wherein the crime shall have been committed, which district shall have been previously ascertained by law . . . ."

Burton argued that both constitutional provisions were violated because the crime had not occurred in the Eastern District of Missouri. Justice Peckham, writing for the entire Court except for Justice Harlan in dissent, reversed Burton's convictions on these grounds. The Court held that Burton's negotiation of the check in Washington, D.C. did not constitute conduct by Burton in St. Louis (the site of the drawee bank). In other words, whatever the Washington, D.C. bank did with the check afterwards, it did for itself, not as Burton's agent. "From the time of the delivery of the check by the defendant to the bank it became the owner of the check; it could have torn it up or thrown it in the fire or made any other use or disposition of it which it chose, and no right of defendant would have been infringed." Thus, the Court held that it was error for the trial judge to have submitted the question of the "understanding . . . between the defendant and the bank" to the jury. In support of this argument, the Court cited several of its own precedents concerning negotiable instrument law, as well as cases from the House of Lords and the courts of New York and Massachusetts.

In a single paragraph, the Court rejected the application of the continuing offense doctrine, which had been codified in Rev. Stat. § 731. "This is not a case of the commencement of a crime in one district and its completion in another so that under the statute the court in either district has jurisdiction. There was no beginning of the offense in Missouri. The payment of the money was in Washington, and there was no commencement of that offense when the officer of the Rialto Company sent the checks from St. Louis to defendant. The latter did not thereby begin an offense in Missouri."

Justice Harlan dissented on this ground. "As between the accused and his client," Harlan argued, "he was not, in any true sense, compensated for the services alleged to have been rendered in violation of the statute, until by payment of the checks by the St. Louis bank he was relieved of all liability to the Riggs National Bank arising from his indorsing the checks to it." Harlan concluded that the majority had "sacrificed substance to mere form," illustrating the Latin maxim "Qui haeret in litera haeret in cortice."

=== Refused jury instructions ===
By the same 8-1 majority, the Court found a separate and independent ground for the reversal of Burton's convictions. Burton had requested certain jury instructions, which the trial judge had delivered. But, along with the requested instructions, the trial judge had stated that: "[These instructions were] asked by counsel for the defendant to give certain declarations here, and while I think they have, in the main, been covered by the charge, yet I will give them to you. . . . These are abstract propositions of law, which I give in connection with the charge, as perhaps more fully amplifying it. I am willing to give them, inasmuch as they are asked, and they contain general propositions of law."

After the jury returned deadlocked 11-1, the trial judge delivered an Allen charge. At this point, the judge refused Burton's request to instruct the jury that the earlier requested instructions stood on the same footing as the other instructions. The Court held that this was reversible error.

Harlan also dissented from this ground for reversal, arguing that Burton was not substantially prejudiced.

Further, the Court disapproved of the judge's having asked the jury for the proportions of their deadlock (even though he did not ask how many were for conviction and how many were for acquittal). In Brasfield v. United States (1926), citing Burton, the Court held that such was reversible error, regardless of whether the defendant objected in the trial court.

== Retrial ==
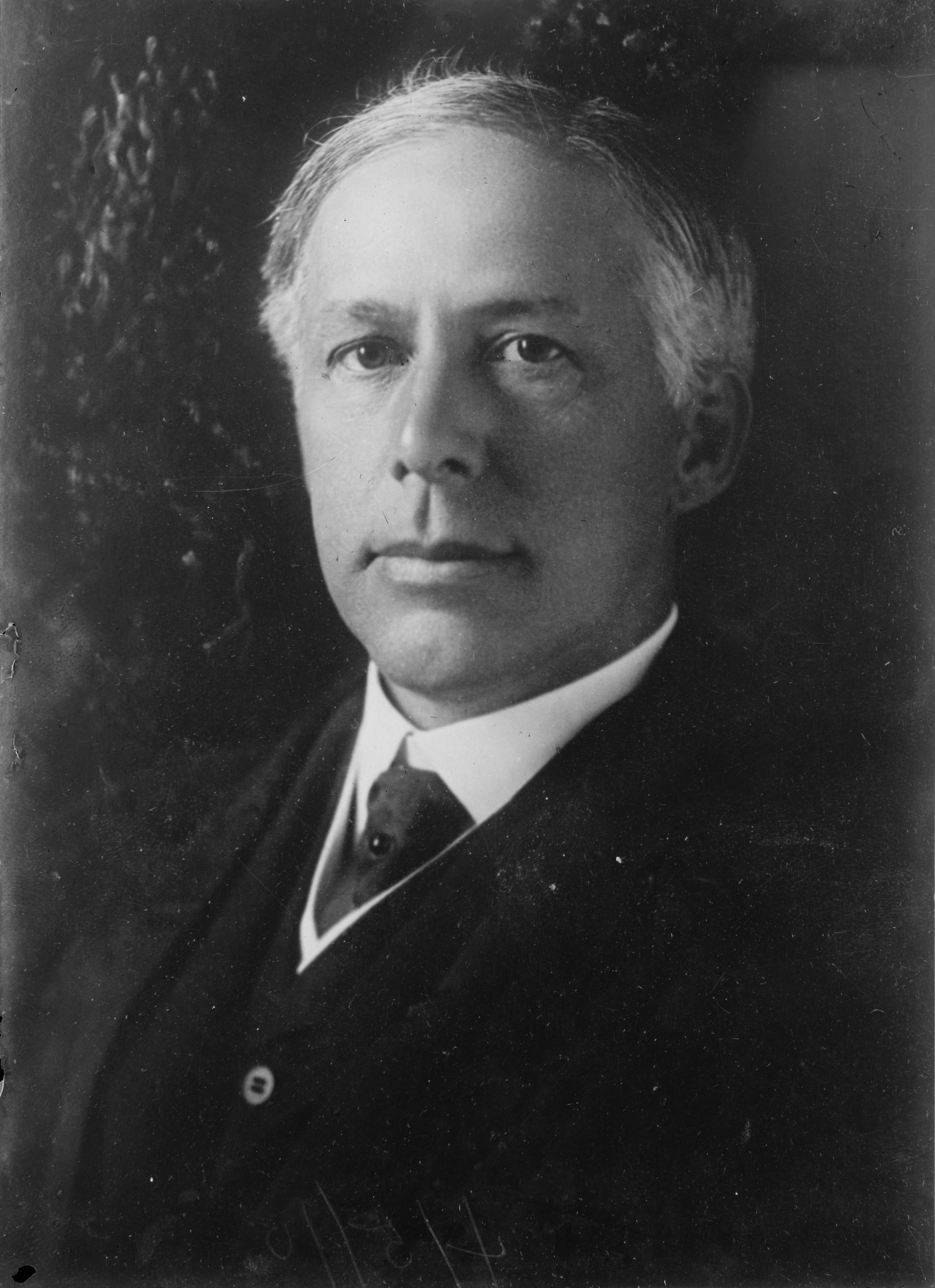
Judge (and future Supreme Court Justice) Van Devanter presided over Burton's second trial.

Burton was reindicted, still in the circuit court Eastern District of Missouri, on April 13, 1905, and arraigned on June 4 before Judge John Henry Rogers, of the Western District of Arkansas, sitting by designation. The new indictment had eight counts. The first, second, fourth, sixth, and eighth counts charged that Burton had agreed to receive compensation from Rialto. The third, fifth, and seventh counts charged that Burton had actually received compensation from Rialto. The counts different only in the interest of the United States which was alleged to have been involved in the matter. Counts four and five were dismissed before trial. Unlike the first indictment, the second alleged that Burton had received $500 in person in St. Louis. The first indictment alleged only compensated representation, the second indictment also alleged an agreement to do so.

While the indictment was pending, Burton was robbed in Chicago and his wallet was recovered in a mail box by postal employees. Before Burton's second trial, the Department of Justice learned that Burton had also collected $14,000 for representing the Chickasaw before the Interior Department: $5,000 of which was paid directly to him, and $9,000 of which was paid to his brother Z.R. Burton.

The trial date was originally set for October 3, and subpoenas to witnesses—many of whom resided in Washington, D.C.—issued on September 12. Judge Willis Van Devanter (a future Supreme Court justice), of the United States Court of Appeals for the Eighth Circuit presided over Burton's second trial. On November 20, Assistant U.S. Attorney Dyer gave the opening statement for the prosecution and Lehmann for the defense. As in the first trial, Lehmann argued that Burton's intent was to represent Dennis (now deceased) in a criminal case.

On November 21, the prosecution introduced the letters, telegrams, and checks into evidence. On November 22, Harland testified that Burton had stated: "I am not going to do anything inconsistent with my duty as a Senator." Mahaney testified to the in-person payment and the destruction of the letters at Burton's request on March 22, 1902. Inspector Cochran testified that Burton represented Rialto before him.

On November 26, 1905, after two hours of deliberation, the jury convicted Burton on the six remaining counts: counts one, two, three, six, seven, and eight. Burton was sentenced on the sixth and seventh counts only (because some of the counts involved the same transactions). Burton was sentenced to six months imprisonment in a county jail and a $2,000 fine on the sixth count and six months imprisonment and a $500 fine on the seventh count. In addition, he was "rendered forever hereafter incapable of holding any office of honor, trust or profit under the Government of the United States."

== Burton II (1906) ==
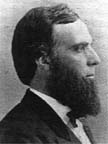
Dillon, the leader of Burton's appellate team

Burton v. United States
- Supreme Court of the United States

Argued April 3 – April 4, 1906 Decided May 21, 1906
- Full case name: Burton v. United States
- Citations: 202 U.S. 344 (more) 26 S. Ct. 688; 50 L. Ed. 1057

Case history
- Prior: C.C.E.D. Mo.; rev'd and remanded, Burton v. United States, 196 U.S. 283 (1905); retrial after remand in C.C.E.D. Mo.
- Subsequent: Rehearing denied

Holding
- (1) Rev. Stat. § 1782 does not unconstitutionally violate the separation of powers (2) The indictment states an offense under Rev. Stat. § 1782 (3) The evidence was sufficient to prove an offense under § 1782 (4) Agreeing to receive compensation, and receiving compensation, are separate offenses under § 1782 (5) Separate convictions for agreeing to receive compensation, and receiving compensation, under § 1782 do not violate the Double Jeopardy Clause (6) Venue and Vicinage were proper in the Eastern District of Missouri

Court membership
- Chief Justice Melville Fuller Associate Justices John M. Harlan · David J. Brewer; Henry B. Brown · Edward D. White; Rufus W. Peckham · Joseph McKenna; Oliver W. Holmes Jr. · William R. Day

Case opinions
- Majority: Harlan, joined by Fuller, Brown, Holmes, Day
- Concur/dissent: McKenna
- Dissent: Brewer, joined by White, Peckham

Laws applied
- U.S. Const. art. III, § 2, cl. 3; U.S. Const. amend. V; U.S. Const. amend. VI; Rev. Stat. § 1782

The second time before the Court, on April 3–4, 1906, Burton was again represented by Dillon and Lehmann, plus Bailey P. Waggener, again with Hubbard and Rossington on the brief, plus W. Knox Haynes and W.P. Hackney. All together, Burton was represented by a team of ten lawyers, led by Dillon. Waggener delivered the argument in chief, assisted by Lehmann. Assistant Attorney General (and future judge) Charles Henry Robb represented the United States.

On May 21, 1906, the Supreme Court upheld Burton's convictions. That same day, another of Burton's lawyers, former Senator John Mellen Thurston, filed a petition for rehearing, which operated as a 60-day continuance, and in effect stayed the matter much longer because the Court was set to adjourn until October.

=== Separation of powers ===
Article One provides: "Each House shall be the Judge of the Elections, Returns and Qualifications of its own Members . . . . Each House may . . . punish its Members for disorderly Behavior, and, with the Concurrence of two-thirds, expel a Member."

Burton argued that § 1782 was an unconstitutional violation of the separation of powers because the Senate's power to punish its members was exclusive. Burton's brief compared the ban on legislators practicing before executive agencies to a ban on the President lobbying legislators for legislation. The New York Times called this "one of the most interesting efforts to get a new meaning out of the Constitution that has appeared for some time." A later article noted that, "[t]he decision is especially interesting because of the large array of legal talent in the case and the ingenious argument made by Bailey Wagner [sic] of Topeka that the Senate is the judge of the qualifications of its own members . . . ."

The Court unanimously rejected this argument. The Court cited earlier laws prohibiting members of Congress from practicing before the United States Court of Claims and from entering into contracts with the United States. Further, the Court noted that "[t]he proper discharge of those duties does not require a Senator to appear before an executive Department in order to enforce his particular views, or the views of others, in respect of matters committed to that Department for determination."

Burton also argued that the provision rendering those convicted under § 1782 "incapable of holding any office of honor, trust or profit under the Government of the United States" unconstitutionally infringed on the Qualifications Clause. The Court dodged this question by holding that the provision would not bar a convicted defendant from serving in the Senate because Senators (at the time) were elected by the state legislatures.

=== Interests of the United States ===
Burton next argued that the indictment was insufficient because the Postmaster's decision to return mail addressed to suspected fraudsters back to senders and to bar suspected fraudsters from cashing money orders was not a "proceeding . . . controversy. . . or other matter or thing in which the United States is . . . directly or indirectly interested." The Court rejected this argument, 6-3. Although the Court admitted that the United States had no pecuniary interest in the proceeding, it argued:

The United States was the real party in interest on one side, while the Rialto Company was the real party in interest on the other side. If the Postmaster General did not represent the United States, whom did he represent? . . . [I]t is, we think, a mistake to say that the United States was not interested, directly or indirectly, in protecting its property, that is, its mails and postal facilities, against improper and illegal use . . . ."

Justice Brewer, joined by Justices White and Peckham dissented on this point. They argued that the statute applied only to the pecuniary interests of the United States. These justices were among the four (in addition to Chief Justice Fuller) who would have held the indictment insufficient in Burton I, presumably for this reason. The dissenters argued that the majority's interpretation would find the United States interested in any administrative proceeding, thus rendering the statutory words "before any Department, court martial, bureau, officer, or any civil, military, or naval commission whatever" to be mere surplussage. Further, the dissent cited the Reconstruction Era legislative history pointing towards a narrower interpretation.

=== Sufficiency of the evidence ===
Burton next argued that the evidence was insufficient to support his conviction. Reviewing the evidence, the Court rejected this argument.

=== Separate offenses of agreeing and receiving ===
Section 1782 provided that "No Senator . . . shall receive or agree to receive any compensation . . . ." Burton argued that he could not simultaneously be charged with separate offenses for agreeing to receive compensation and actually receiving compensation for the same transaction. The Court rejected this argument. The Court stated that Burton's interpretation "does violence to [the statute's] words," emphasizing the word "or."

Justice McKenna disagreed with this holding. Thus, he concurred only in the affirmance of the charges alleging receipt, not the charges alleging agreement.

=== Double jeopardy ===
Burton next argued that his prosecution violated the Double Jeopardy Clause. Specifically, Burton argued that his acquittal on the third count in the first trial barred his conviction on the third and seventh counts in the second trial. The Court rejected this argument. The Court held that the earlier and later counts did not describe the same offense because they named the payor as Mahaney and Rialto, respectively.

=== Venue and vicinage ===
Finally, Burton argued that the Eastern District of Missouri was an unconstitutional venue and vicinage (an argument that the Court had accepted in Burton I). This time, the Court rejected the argument. The Court held that the agreement had occurred in St. Louis (as the jury had been instructed that it was required to find) based on Rialto's acceptance in St. Louis, the telegram, and the letter. The Court bolstered this view by citation to its own and other precedents concerning offer and acceptance in contract law. The Court further cited its earlier precedents holding that the venue provision of Article III does not require the physical presence of the defendant in the forum state.

== Aftermath ==
Burton remained a senator while each of his appeals were pending. Allegedly, his colleagues made it known that they would move to expel him if he appeared in the Senate. However, Burton did appear in the Senate after his conviction. On April 6, 1904, Burton appeared to push for appropriations for the acquisition of land in the Adirondacks and Catskills. On January 22, 1906, Burton appeared in the Senate chamber again, for 30 seconds, in order to be eligible for $1,000 in travel reimbursements from the federal government.

Burton's term was due to expire on March 4, 1907. After his conviction was finally affirmed, a resolution to expel Burton from the Senate was referred to the United States Senate Committee on Privileges and Elections on May 22, 1906. Burton resigned from office on June 4, 1906, before the Senate could act.

Burton served five months of his six-month sentence in the Iron County Jail in Ironton, Missouri. In March 1907, he returned to Abilene.

== Role of President Roosevelt ==
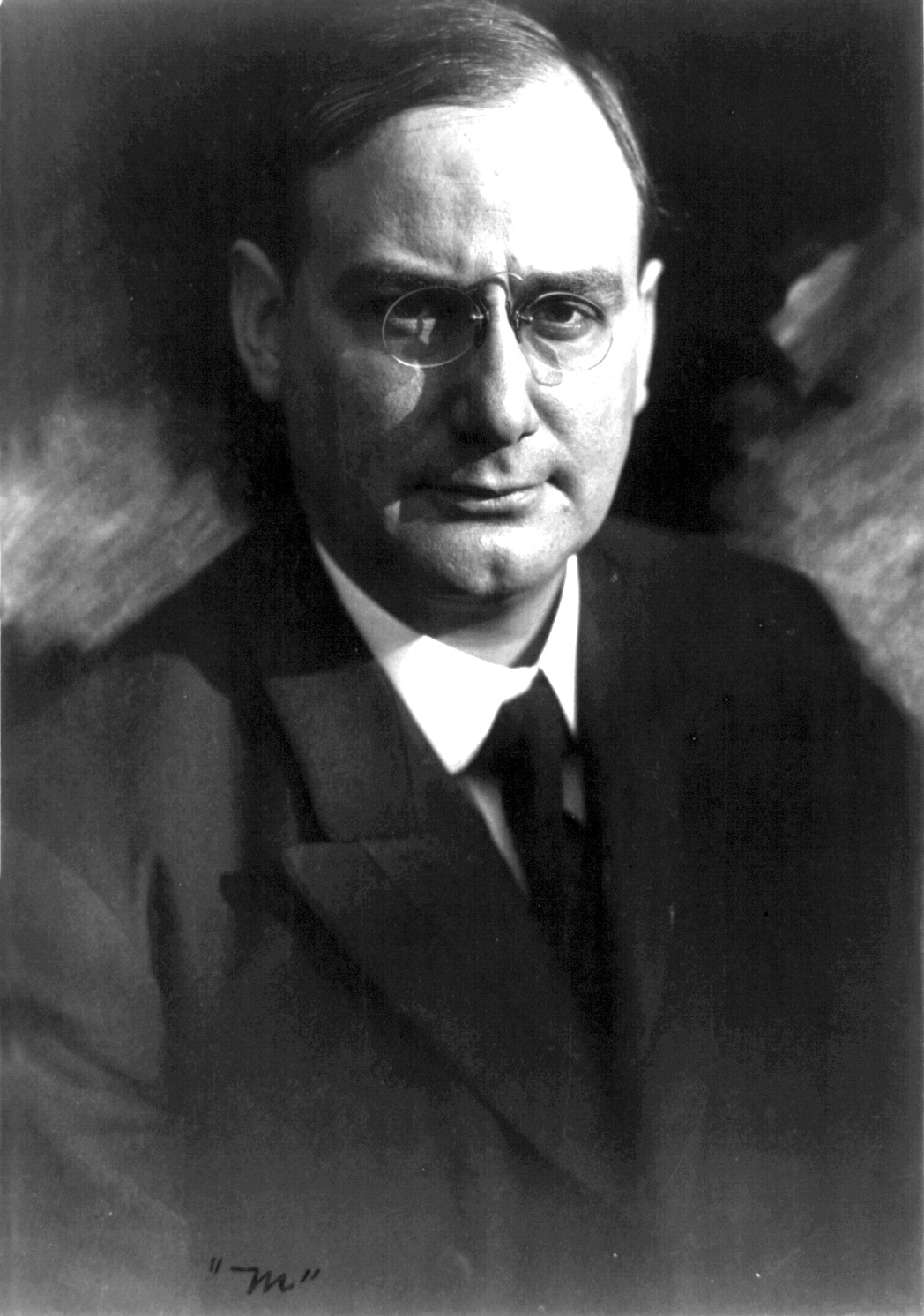
Circuit Attorney Folk visited the White House prior to Burton's indictment.

Contemporary rumor held that Burton's indictment had been ordered by President Theodore Roosevelt. Although Joseph W. Folk, the Circuit Attorney for the City of St. Louis (and future Governor of Missouri), had recently visited with the President and Attorney General, the New York Times reported that "there was not a word in either of those interviews about the Burton case."

Burton himself alleged that Roosevelt had orchestrated his prosecution on March 23, 1907 speech in Abilene, Kansas after his release from prison. Burton pointed out that his was the first prosecution under § 1782 and that numerous other public officials before him had potentially violated it, under the interpretation that prevailed in the Supreme Court.

Burton and Roosevelt had a complicated history. Burton, as a leader at the 1900 Republican National Convention, was perhaps instrumental in Roosevelt's securing his party's nomination. Roosevelt's last appointment to the United States Court of Appeals for the Eighth Circuit (whose jurisdiction, at the time, included appeals from Kansas) had been William Cather Hook, a choice favored by Burton's political opponents: Senator Chester I. Long (R-KS) and Governor Willis J. Bailey (R-KS). When the next vacancy opened on the Eighth Circuit, Burton and his allies favored the appointment of Charles Blood Smith. D.W. Mulvane was unsuccessful in pressing Smith's candidacy in a June 1903 meeting with Roosevelt.

Earlier that year, while accompanying Roosevelt on a visit to Kansas, Burton told Roosevelt about his project to create a reproduction of Jerusalem at the time of Christ's birth for the St. Louis World's Fair. Roosevelt gave Burton a letter praising the exhibit, which Burton in turn published by facsimile in a magazine advertisement for the sale of stock in the exhibit. The White House received a letter from the magazine inquiring into the authenticity of the letter on the same day that Mulvane returned for a second meeting to press Smith's appointment. Roosevelt was enraged, demanded the return of the letter, and declared that "from now on Burton would be considered politically a Democratic Senator, as far as patronage is concerned." "The President's indignation knew no bounds. He had never been so grossly and humiliatingly deceived during his incumbency in office."

Burton was also in a "long standing feud" with Fourth Assistant Postmaster (and future senator) Joseph L. Bristow, whom Burton had lobbied Roosevelt (and his predecessor, William McKinley) to replace. Roosevelt refused to remove Bristow except for cause, and in any case refused to appoint one of Burton's friends to replace him.

Another issue with which Burton clashed with Roosevelt was reciprocity with Cuba. Burton cited this issue in his Abilene speech. In order to force concessions from Roosevelt, Burton had joined with Senators from beet sugar states. Although Burton publicly spoke against a treaty with Cuba, he repeatedly privately informed Roosevelt that he would support the ratification of the treaty. According to the New York Times, "[t]he history of Burton's manoeuvres at this time will never be fully told."
