= Wallace Winter =

American college football player and coach, railroad executive (1872–1947)

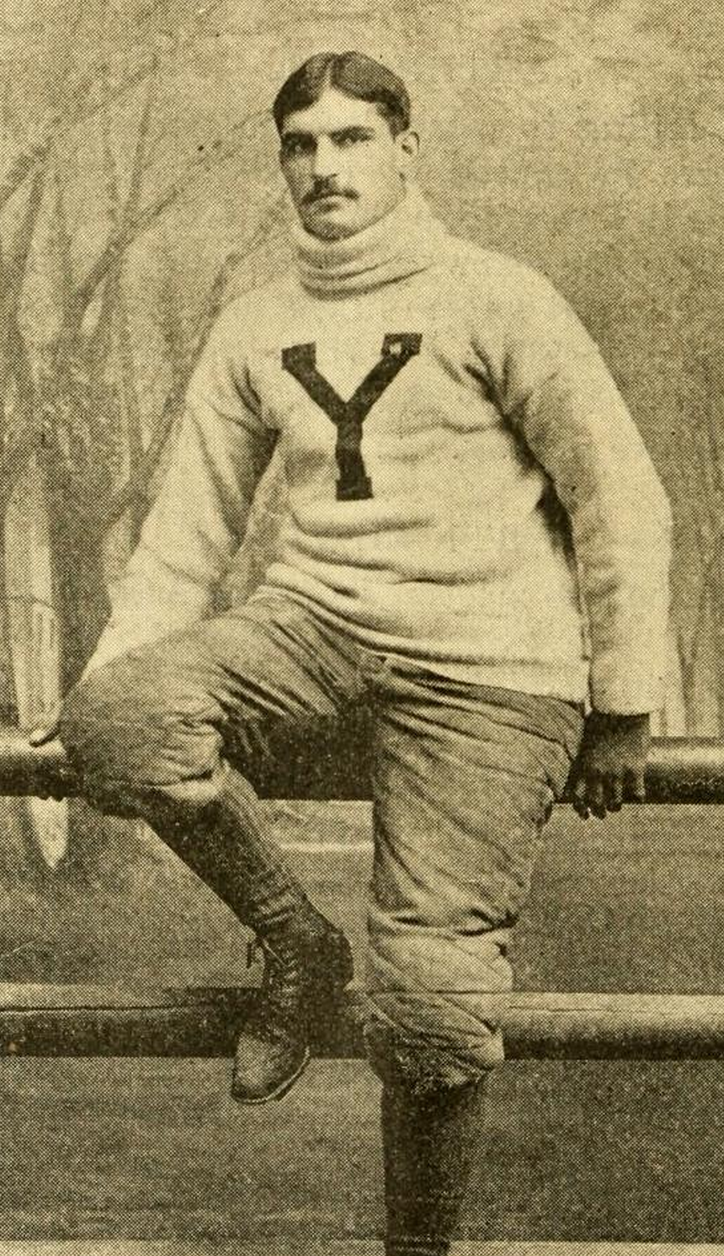
- Winter pictured in The Official National Collegiate Athletic Association football guide, 1893

Biographical details
- Born: August 8, 1872; Marinette, Wisconsin, U.S.
- Died: May 10, 1947 (aged 74); Chicago, Illinois, U.S.

Playing career
- 1891–1892: Yale
- Position: Tackle

Coaching career (HC unless noted)
- 1893: Minnesota

Head coaching record
- Overall: 6–0

Accomplishments and honors

Championships
- 1 Intercollegiate Athletic Association of the Northwest (1893)

Awards
- Consensus All-American (1891)

Wallace Charles Winter Sr. (August 8, 1872 – May 10, 1947) was an American college football player and coach and railroad executive. He played tackle at Yale University from 1890 to 1892 and was selected to the 1891 College Football All-America Team.

After graduating from Yale, he became a competitive golfer.

== Biography ==
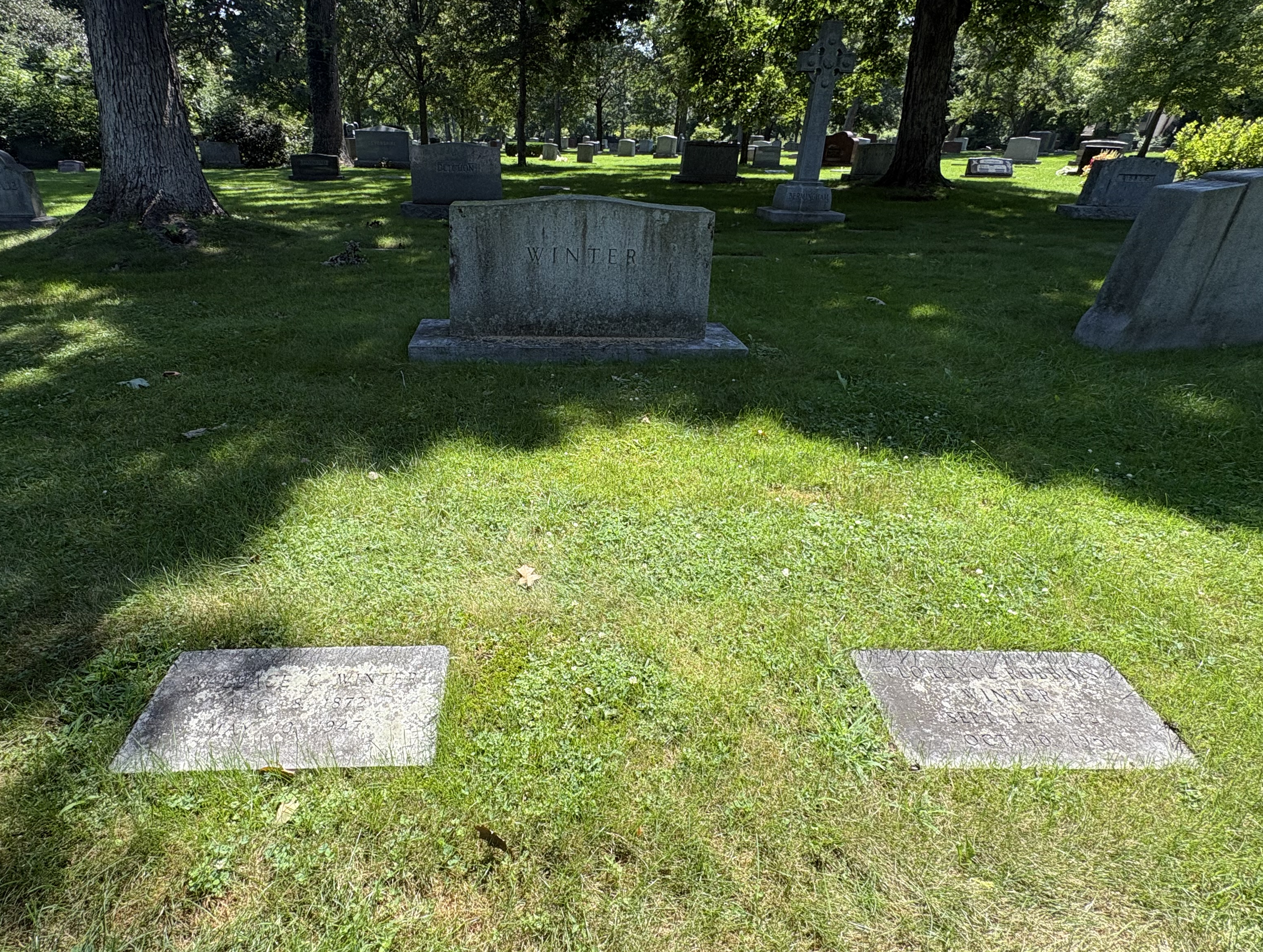
Winter's grave at Lake Forest Cemetery

A native of Marinette, Wisconsin, Winter grew up in Saint Paul, Minnesota.

Winter served as the head football coach at the University of Minnesota for the 1893 Golden Gophers season, leading the team to a 6–0 overall record including a 3–0 mark in Intercollegiate Athletic Association of the Northwest league play. He was known for working the players extremely hard, to the point that "they considered the actual games to be breathers compared to the scrimmages." but agreed to the conditions as long as he could act as the referee.

Winters's son, Wallace C. Winter Jr., was a back for the Yale football team, but quit the team to serve as an aviator in France during World War I. The younger Winter was killed in action in March 1918 while flying behind enemy lines in Germany. Winter had earlier been reported missing, but survived that episode to receive the Croix de Guerre in February 1917.

He later served as director of the Burlington Railroad and superintendent of the Omaha Railway. Winter died on May 10, 1947, at his home in Chicago, and was buried at Lake Forest Cemetery.

== Head coaching record ==
Year	Team	Overall	Conference	Standing	Bowl/playoffs
Minnesota Golden Gophers (Intercollegiate Athletic Association of the Northwest) (1893)
1893	Minnesota	6–0	3–0	1st	
Minnesota:		6–0	3–0		
Total:		6–0			
National championship Conference title Conference division title or championship game berth
