= List of United States Supreme Court cases, volume 196 =

Supreme Court of the United States
- Interactive map of Supreme Court of the United States
- 38°53′26″N 77°00′16″W
- Established: March 4, 1789; 236 years ago
- Location: Washington, D.C.
- Coordinates: 38°53′26″N 77°00′16″W
- Composition method: Presidential nomination with Senate confirmation
- Authorised by: Constitution of the United States, Art. III, § 1
- Judge term length: life tenure, subject to impeachment and removal
- Number of positions: 9 (by statute)
- Website: supremecourt.gov

This is a list of cases reported in volume 196 of United States Reports, decided by the Supreme Court of the United States in 1904 and 1905.

== Justices of the Supreme Court at the time of volume 196 U.S. ==
The Supreme Court is established by Article III, Section 1 of the Constitution of the United States, which says: "The judicial Power of the United States, shall be vested in one supreme Court . . .". The size of the Court is not specified; the Constitution leaves it to Congress to set the number of justices. Under the Judiciary Act of 1789 Congress originally fixed the number of justices at six (one chief justice and five associate justices). Since 1789 Congress has varied the size of the Court from six to seven, nine, ten, and back to nine justices (always including one chief justice).

When the cases in volume 196 were decided the Court comprised the following nine members:

Portrait	Justice	Office	Home State	Succeeded	Date confirmed by the Senate (Vote)	Tenure on Supreme Court
	Melville Fuller	Chief Justice	Illinois	Morrison Waite	July 20, 1888 (41–20)	October 8, 1888 – July 4, 1910 (Died)
	John Marshall Harlan	Associate Justice	Kentucky	David Davis	November 29, 1877 (Acclamation)	December 10, 1877 – October 14, 1911 (Died)
	David Josiah Brewer	Associate Justice	Kansas	Stanley Matthews	December 18, 1889 (53–11)	January 6, 1890 – March 28, 1910 (Died)
	Henry Billings Brown	Associate Justice	Michigan	Samuel Freeman Miller	December 29, 1890 (Acclamation)	January 5, 1891 – May 28, 1906 (Retired)
	Edward Douglass White	Associate Justice	Louisiana	Samuel Blatchford	February 19, 1894 (Acclamation)	March 12, 1894 – December 18, 1910 (Continued as chief justice)
	Rufus W. Peckham	Associate Justice	New York	Howell Edmunds Jackson	December 9, 1895 (Acclamation)	January 6, 1896 – October 24, 1909 (Died)
	Joseph McKenna	Associate Justice	California	Stephen Johnson Field	January 21, 1898 (Acclamation)	January 26, 1898 – January 5, 1925 (Retired)
	Oliver Wendell Holmes Jr.	Associate Justice	Massachusetts	Horace Gray	December 4, 1902 (Acclamation)	December 8, 1902 – January 12, 1932 (Retired)
	William R. Day	Associate Justice	Ohio	George Shiras Jr.	February 23, 1903 (Acclamation)	March 2, 1903 – November 13, 1922 (Retired)

== Notable Case in 196 U.S. ==
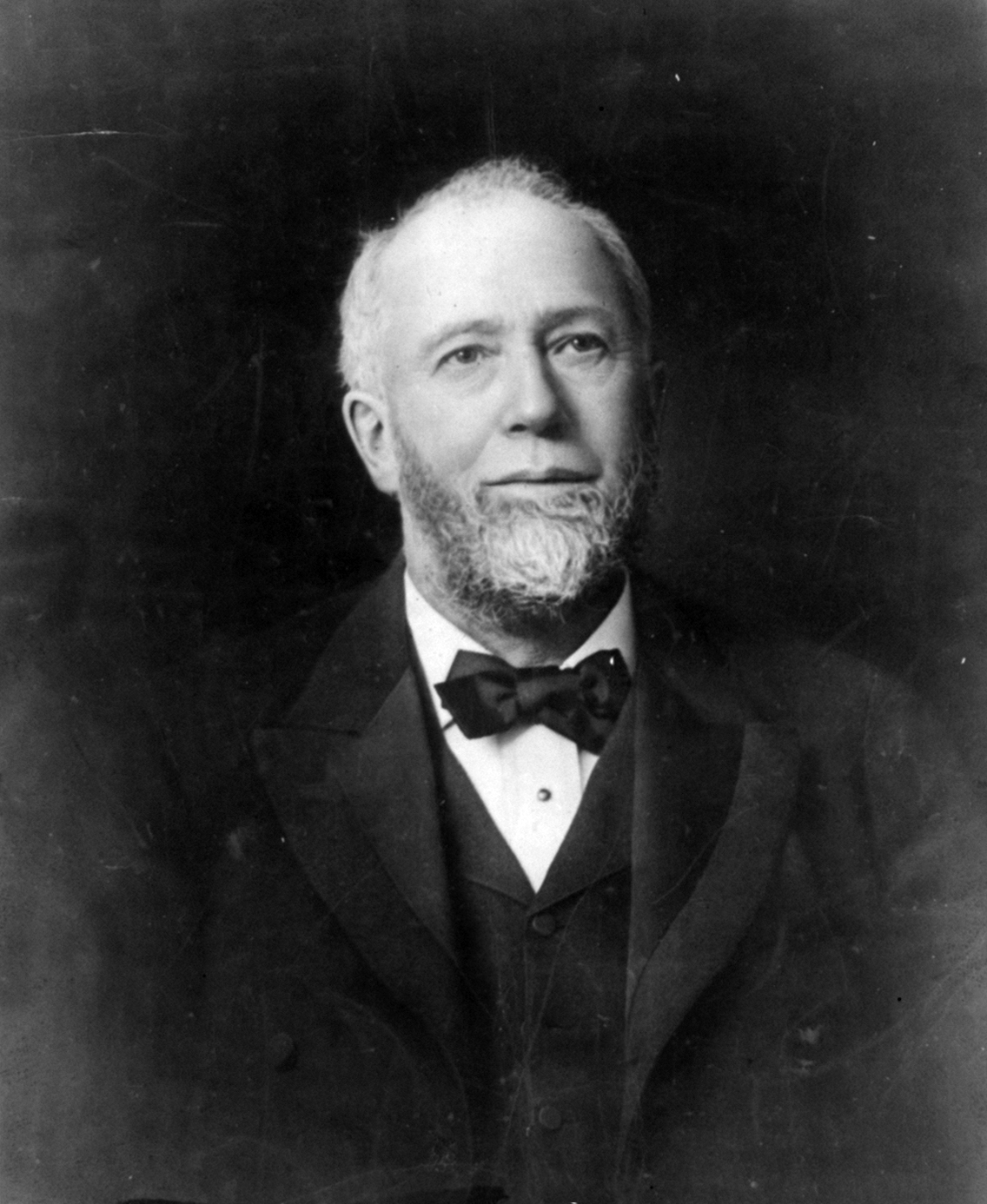
G.F. Swift

=== Swift & Co. v. United States ===
Swift & Co. v. United States, 196 U.S. 375 (1904), is a landmark decision under the Sherman Antitrust Act of 1890. The Supreme Court ruled that the Commerce Clause of the United States Constitution allows the federal government to regulate monopolies having a direct effect on commerce. It marked the success of the Presidency of Theodore Roosevelt in destroying the Beef Trust. In particular, it allowed Congress to regulate the Chicago slaughterhouse industry; though the slaughterhouses claimed they dealt only in intrastate commerce, the butchering of meat was held by the Court to be merely a "station" along the way between cow and consumer. So, as part of the national meat industry among different states, Congress can regulate it. The federal government's victory in the case encouraged it to pursue other antitrust actions. Public opinion, outraged by Upton Sinclair's novel The Jungle, which depicted horribly unsanitary conditions in Chicago's meatpacking plants, supported the decision. Congress followed by passing in 1906 both the Pure Food and Drug Act and the Meat Inspection Act.

== Citation style ==
Under the Judiciary Act of 1789 the federal court structure at the time comprised District Courts, which had general trial jurisdiction; Circuit Courts, which had mixed trial and appellate (from the US District Courts) jurisdiction; and the United States Supreme Court, which had appellate jurisdiction over the federal District and Circuit courts—and for certain issues over state courts. The Supreme Court also had limited original jurisdiction (i.e., in which cases could be filed directly with the Supreme Court without first having been heard by a lower federal or state court). There were one or more federal District Courts and/or Circuit Courts in each state, territory, or other geographical region.

The Judiciary Act of 1891 created the United States Courts of Appeals and reassigned the jurisdiction of most routine appeals from the district and circuit courts to these appellate courts. The Act created nine new courts that were originally known as the "United States Circuit Courts of Appeals." The new courts had jurisdiction over most appeals of lower court decisions. The Supreme Court could review either legal issues that a court of appeals certified or decisions of court of appeals by writ of certiorari.

Bluebook citation style is used for case names, citations, and jurisdictions.

- "# Cir." = United States Court of Appeals
  - e.g., "3d Cir." = United States Court of Appeals for the Third Circuit
- "C.C.D." = United States Circuit Court for the District of . . .
  - e.g.,"C.C.D.N.J." = United States Circuit Court for the District of New Jersey
- "D." = United States District Court for the District of . . .
  - e.g.,"D. Mass." = United States District Court for the District of Massachusetts
- "E." = Eastern; "M." = Middle; "N." = Northern; "S." = Southern; "W." = Western
  - e.g.,"C.C.S.D.N.Y." = United States Circuit Court for the Southern District of New York
  - e.g.,"M.D. Ala." = United States District Court for the Middle District of Alabama
- "Ct. Cl." = United States Court of Claims
- The abbreviation of a state's name alone indicates the highest appellate court in that state's judiciary at the time.
  - e.g.,"Pa." = Supreme Court of Pennsylvania
  - e.g.,"Me." = Supreme Judicial Court of Maine

== List of cases in volume 196 U.S. ==
Case Name	Page & year	Opinion of the Court	Concurring opinion(s)	Dissenting opinion(s)	Lower Court	Disposition
Johnson v. Southern P.R.R. Co.	1 (1904)	Fuller	none	none	8th Cir.	reversed
Missouri v. Nebraska	23 (1904)	Harlan	none	none	original	continued
Keely v. Moore	38 (1904)	Brown	none	none	D.C. Cir.	affirmed
Hunt v. Springfield F. & M. Ins. Co.	47 (1904)	Brown	none	none	D.C. Cir.	affirmed
Texas & P. Ry. Co. v. Swearingen	51 (1904)	White	none	none	5th Cir.	affirmed
Lee v. Robinson	64 (1904)	Holmes	none	none	C.C.D.S.C.	affirmed
Wetmore v. Markoe	68 (1904)	Day	none	none	N.Y. Sup. Ct.	affirmed
Harding v. Illinois	78 (1904)	Day	none	none	Ill.	dismissed
Courtney v. Pradt	89 (1905)	Fuller	none	none	C.C.E.D. Ky.	dismissed
Smalley v. Laugenour	93 (1905)	Fuller	none	none	Wash.	dismissed
Comstock v. Eagleton	99 (1905)	Fuller	none	none	Sup. Ct. Terr. Okla.	dismissed
Scott v. Carew	100 (1905)	Brewer	none	none	5th Cir.	affirmed
First Nat'l Bank v. Lasater	115 (1905)	Brewer	none	none	Tex. Civ. App.	reversed
Butte C.W. Co. v. Baker	119 (1905)	Brewer	none	none	Mont.	affirmed
Chicago et al. Ry. Co. v. McGuire	128 (1905)	Brown	none	none	Ind. App.	dismissed
American Express Co. v. Iowa	133 (1905)	White	none	none	Iowa	reversed
Adams E. Co. v. Iowa	147 (1905)	White	none	none	Iowa	reversed
Lucius v. Cawthon C. Co.	149 (1905)	White	none	none	S.D. Ala.	dismissed
Wolff v. District of Columbia	152 (1905)	McKenna	none	none	D.C. Cir.	affirmed
DC has no special duty to light streets to prevent people from tripping over lawful road obstructions.
Moore v. United States	157 (1905)	McKenna	none	none	Ct. Cl.	reversed
Hartigan v. United States	169 (1904)	McKenna	none	none	Ct. Cl.	affirmed
Sixto v. Sarria	175 (1905)	Day	none	none	D.P.R.	reversed
Fullerton v. Texas	194 (1905)	Fuller	none	none	Tex. Crim. App.	dismissed
Central of Ga. Ry. Co. v. Murphey	194 (1905)	Peckham	none	none	Ga.	reversed
United States v. United V.C. Co.	207 (1905)	McKenna	none	Brown	Sup. Ct. Terr. Ariz.	affirmed
Union S.Y. Co. v. Chicago, Burlington & Quincy R.R. Co.	217 (1905)	Day	none	none	8th Cir.	certification
Slavens v. United States	229 (1905)	Day	none	none	Ct. Cl.	affirmed
Madisonville T. Co. v. St. Bernard M. Co.	239 (1905)	Harlan	none	Holmes	C.C.W.D. Ky.	affirmed
Cook v. Marshall Cnty.	261 (1905)	Brown	White	none	Iowa	affirmed
Hodge v. Muscatine Cnty.	276 (1905)	Brown	White	none	Iowa	affirmed
Burton v. United States	283 (1905)	Peckham	none	Harlan	E.D. Mo.	reversed
United States v. Harvey S. Co.	310 (1905)	Holmes	none	none	Ct. Cl.	affirmed
Rooney v. North Dakota	319 (1905)	Harlan	none	none	N.D.	affirmed
United States v. Crosley	327 (1905)	Day	none	none	Ct. Cl.	affirmed
Creede et al. Co. v. Uinta et al. Co.	337 (1905)	Brewer	none	none	8th Cir.	affirmed
Ramsey v. Tacoma L. Co.	360 (1905)	Brewer	none	none	Wash.	affirmed
Munsey v. Clough	364 (1905)	Peckham	none	none	N.H.	affirmed
Swift & Co. v. United States	375 (1905)	Holmes	none	none	C.C.N.D. Ill.	affirmed
Small v. Rakestraw	403 (1905)	Holmes	none	none	Mont.	affirmed
Hamburg American Steamship Co. v. Grube	407 (1905)	Fuller	none	none	N.H.	affirmed
McDaniel v. Traylor	415 (1905)	Harlan	none	none	C.C.E.D. Ark.	reversed
Caledonian C. Co. v. Baker	432 (1905)	Harlan	none	none	Sup. Ct. Terr. N.M.	affirmed
Smiley v. Kansas	447 (1905)	Brewer	none	none	Kan.	affirmed
Allen v. Alleghany Co.	458 (1905)	Brown	none	none	N.J. Sup. Ct.	dismissed
Corry v. City of Baltimore	466 (1905)	White	none	none	Md.	affirmed
Vanderbilt v. Eidman	480 (1905)	White	none	none	2d Cir.	certification
Western T. & T. Co. v. Brown	502 (1905)	White	none	none	8th Cir.	reversed
United States v. Engard	511 (1905)	White	none	none	Ct. Cl.	affirmed
Thompson v. Fairbanks	516 (1905)	Peckham	none	none	Vt.	affirmed
City of Oklahoma City v. McMaster	529 (1905)	Peckham	none	none	Sup. Ct. Terr. Okla.	reversed
City of Worcester v. Worcester C.S. Ry. Co.	539 (1905)	Peckham	none	none	Mass.	affirmed
Flanigan v. Sierra Cnty.	553 (1905)	McKenna	none	none	9th Cir.	reversed
Wheeler v. Plumas Cnty.	562 (1905)	McKenna	none	none	9th Cir.	reversed
McCaffrey v. Manogue	563 (1905)	McKenna	none	none	D.C. Cir.	reversed
United States v. Montana L. Mfg. Co.	573 (1905)	McKenna	none	none	9th Cir.	certification
Doctor v. Harrington	579 (1905)	McKenna	none	none	C.C.S.D.N.Y.	reversed
The Germanic	589 (1905)	Holmes	none	none	2d Cir.	affirmed
Coulter v. Louisville & N.R.R. Co.	599 (1905)	Holmes	none	none	C.C.E.D. Ky.	reversed
Scottish et al. Co. v. Bowland	611 (1905)	Day	none	none	C.C.S.D. Ohio	reversed

== See also ==
- Certificate of division
