= Horace Dyer =

American football player and attorney (1873–1928)

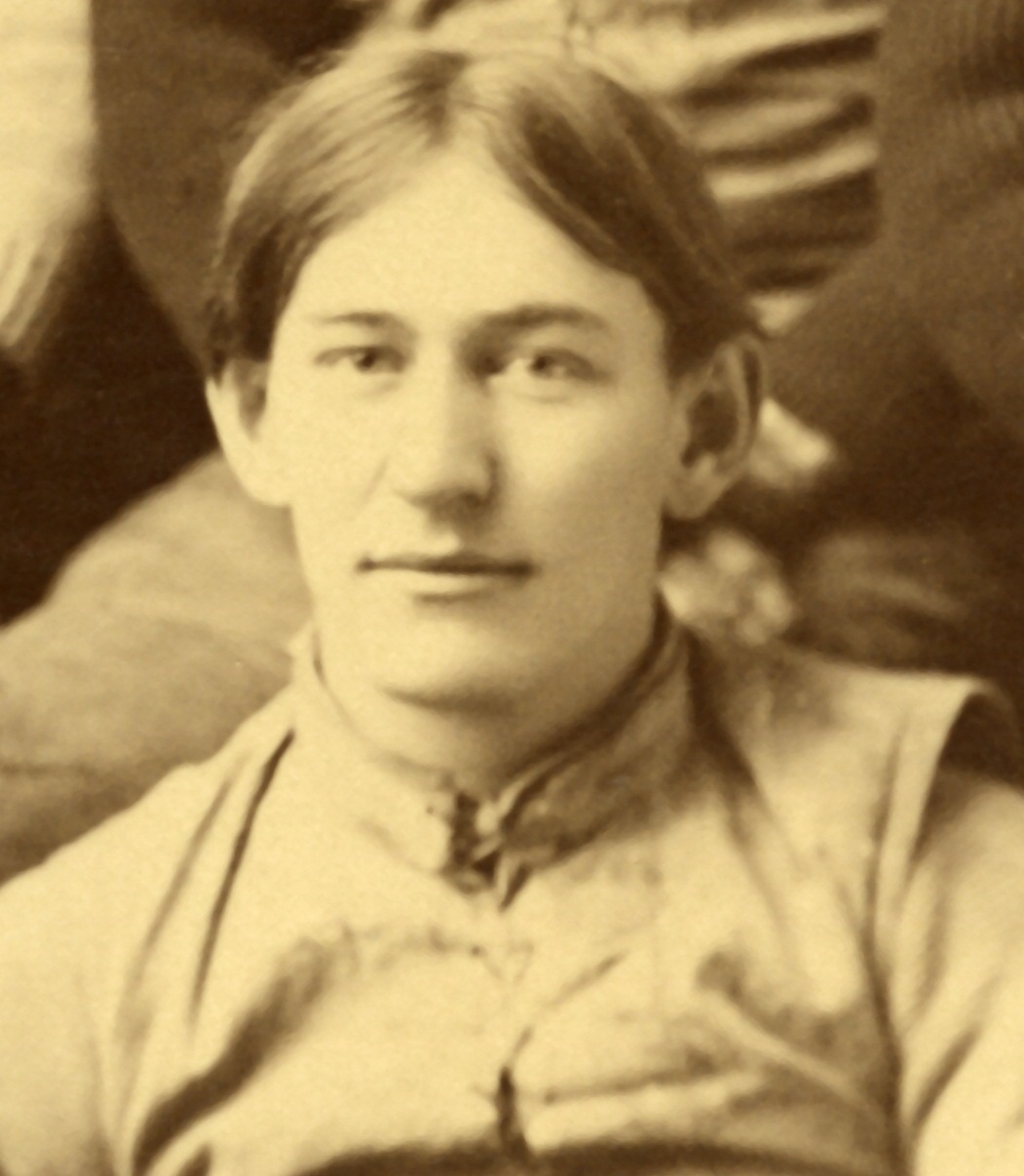
- Dyer cropped from 1894 Michigan team photograph
- Born: Horace Levi Dyer; February 24, 1873; Louisiana, Missouri
- Died: July 3, 1928 (aged 55)
- Citizenship: United States
- Education: University of Michigan
- Occupation: Attorney
- Known for: Federal prosecutor of substantial fraud cases
- Spouse(s): Bettie Edgar, m. 1899 (d. 1901); Betty Wilcox, m. 1905
- Children: David (b. 1908); John (b. 1913)

Horace Levi Dyer (February 24, 1873 – July 3, 1928) was an American football player and attorney. He played at the halfback position for the 1894 Michigan Wolverines football team and was an attorney assigned to prosecute complex fraud cases from the 1900s to the 1920s.

== Early years ==
Dyer was born in Louisiana, Missouri, in 1873, the son of David Patterson Dyer, a federal judge and member of Congress. He received his preparatory education at the Stoddard School, Clark's Academy, and the Smith Academy, all in St. Louis, Missouri.

== University of Michigan ==
Dyer enrolled at the University of Michigan in 1890 and played as a halfback for the 1894 Michigan Wolverines football team. He helped lead the team to a 9-1-1 record, the best record in the history of the Michigan football team to that date. He was five feet, seven inches tall and weighed 167 pounds as a football player.

== Legal career ==
After receiving his LL.B. degree from Michigan in 1895, Dyer returned to St. Louis, where he practiced law. He was an assistant city attorney from 1899 to 1902 and an Assistant U.S. Attorney starting in 1902. Dyer developed a reputation for prosecuting significant fraud cases and was often dispatched by the U.S. Department of Justice as a special prosecutor in such cases.

In 1905, Dyer was assigned to prosecute Joseph R. Burton, a U.S. Senator from Kansas. Burton was charged with accepting compensation from the Rialto Grain & Securities Company (a "get-rich-quick" concern), to represent Rialto before the post office department to prevent the issuance of a fraud order against the company. Dyer secured a conviction of Burton in the second trial of the matter (the first conviction was reversed by the U.S. Supreme Court). See Burton v. United States

In 1923, he was appointed Assistant Attorney General of the United States with the responsibility to prosecute the leaders of the Egan Gang, also known as Egan's Rats. He led the prosecutions that resulted in the conviction and imprisonment of William Colbeck, "Chippy" Robinson, "Red" Smith, Oliver Dougherty, Stephen Ryan, "Featheredge" Schneider, Roy Tipton, "Red" Lanham, and Leo Cronin.

In 1926, Dyer was appointed as the special prosecutor in connection with an investigation and subsequent prosecution of Clarence Saunders, the founder of the Piggly Wiggly supermarkets, in connection with fraudulent sales of the company's stock.

In 1927, the U.S. Department of Justice sent Dyer to Tampa, Florida, to prosecute companies and individuals engaged in fraudulent real estate transactions during the Florida land boom of the 1920s.

Dyer died at age 56 in July 1928 during the prosecution of Clarence Saunders in the Piggly Wiggly case. The cause of death was heart disease. Following Dyer's death, an order from Washington, D.C., dismissed the case.

== Family ==
Burton married Bettie Edgar in 1899, and she died in 1901. He married Betty Wilcox in 1905, and they had two sons, David (born 1908) and John (born 1913). In a draft registration card completed at the time of World War I, Dyer stated that he was a lawyer with an office in the Central National Bank Building in St. Louis. At the time of the 1920 United States census, he was living in St. Louis with his wife and two sons, and was employed as an attorney.
