= 1893 Minnesota Golden Gophers football team =

American college football season

1893 Minnesota Golden Gophers football

IAANW champion
- Conference: Intercollegiate Athletic Association of the Northwest
- Record: 6–0 (3–0 IAANW)
- Head coach: Wallace Winter (1st season)
- Captain: James E. Madigan

1893 Intercollegiate Athletic Association of the Northwest football standings
	Conf.					Overall
Team	W		L		T	W		L		T
Minnesota $	3	–	0	–	0	6	–	0	–	0
Wisconsin	1	–	1	–	0	4	–	2	–	0
Michigan	1	–	2	–	0	7	–	3	–	0
Northwestern	0	–	2	–	0	2	–	5	–	3
$ – Conference champion

The 1893 Minnesota Golden Gophers football team represented the University of Minnesota in the 1893 college football season. It was the only season under head coach Wallace Winter and it featured the second season of the Intercollegiate Athletic Association of the Northwest. Minnesota plowed undefeated through its schedule to set up an end-of-season matchup with Wisconsin for the league title. The game was a rout and the teams agreed to stop the game early after Minnesota took a 40–0 lead. Due to financial difficulties, the league disbanded after the 1893 season.

== Schedule ==
Date	Time	Opponent	Site	Result	Source
October 14	3:15 p.m.	Kansas*	Minneapolis ball park grounds; Minneapolis, MN	W 12–6	
October 21		Grinnell*	Minneapolis, MN	W 36–6	
October 24		at Hamline*	St. Paul, MN	W 10–6	
October 28	3:00 p.m.	at Michigan	Ann Arbor, MI (rivalry)	W 34–20	
October 30		at Northwestern	Evanston, IL	W 16–0	
November 11		Wisconsin	Minneapolis, MN (rivalry)	W 40–0	
*Non-conference game

== Game summaries ==
=== Wisconsin ===
On November 11, 1893, Minnesota finished its season with a 40 to 0 victory over Wisconsin in Minneapolis. Left halfback Pillsbury scored four touchdowns, and right halfback Adams scored three.

== Roster ==
- Center, James E. Madigan (captain)
- Guards, Everhart P. Harding (right guard); Augustus T. Larson (left guard)
- Tackles, Constant Larson (left tackle); William C. Muir (right tackle)
- Ends, Edgar C. Bisbee (right end); William F. Dalrymple (left end)
- Quarterback, Charles H. Van Campen
- Halfbacks, Walter N. Southworth (right half); George K. Belden (left half)
- Fullback, Henry C. Cutler
- Substitutes, Charles Adams, Ralph K. Keene, George A. Finlayson, Mason W. Spicer, W. Oakley Stout, Willis J. Walker, J. LeMoyne Danner Jr.
- Coach, Wallie Winter.
