= Henry M. Senter =

American football player and businessman (1873–1934)

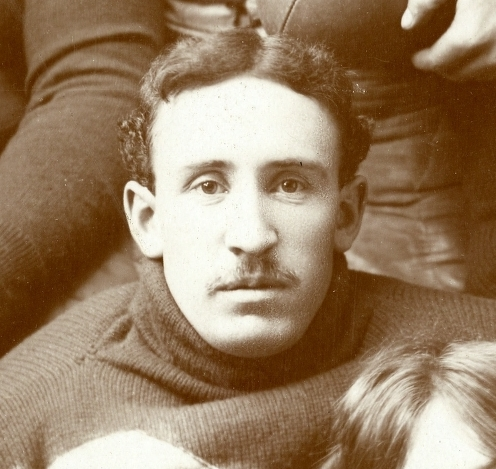
- Henry M. Senter cropped from 1896 University of Michigan team photograph
- Born: August 29, 1873; Eagle River, Michigan, US
- Died: April 15, 1934 (aged 60); California, US
- Education: University of Michigan
- Known for: Football player

Henry Mortimer "Mort" Senter (August 29, 1873 – April 15, 1934) was an American football player and businessman. He played college football for the University of Michigan from 1893 to 1896. He was selected as a first-team All-Western end in 1895 and as captain of the 1896 team. After receiving his degree, he moved to Colombia where he operated a coffee plantation. He became involved in a diplomatic incident after Colombian soldiers seized certain personal property from his home in 1902.

== Early years ==
Senter was the son of a wealthy family from Houghton, Michigan. His father, John Senter was a native of New Hampshire and a commercial merchant. His mother, Lizzie Senter, was a native of New York. At the time of the 1880 United States census, Senter was living in Houghton with his parents, an older sister (Nattie), and an older brother (Albert W.).

== University of Michigan ==
He attended the University of Michigan and was enrolled in the medical school. While attending Michigan, he played football for the Michigan Wolverines football team from 1893 to 1896. He helped lead the 1895 Michigan Wolverines football team to an 8–1 record. The 1895 team won seven of their games by shutouts, and outscored their opponents by a combined score of 266 to 14. The sole loss of the season was a 4–0 setback against the Harvard Crimson, then one of the three great football powers. Senter was one of the stars of the 1895 team which laid claim to the title of "Champions of the West" and was selected as a first-team All-Western player by a Chicago newspaper, which wrote:

Senter is one of the best ends in the country, East or West. He is the one Western player who approaches Yale form and a man of whom Michigan is deservedly proud. Possessed of unbounded daring, he plays like a demon and runs and tackles in a manner astonishing in a player of so short experience.

Before the Harvard game, The Boston Sunday Globe wrote: "In Senter Michigan has undoubtedly the best end the west has yet developed. He is now crippled by a bad knee, but the Harvard backs will not find it easy to get around him, for all that. He is a sure ground-gainer, as well. His weight is 168 pounds."

In December 1895, Senter was voted by his teammates to serve as the captain of the 1896 team. At the time, The Michigan Alumnus reported on Senter's election:

Every vote was cast on the first ballot for Henry Mortimer Senter, of Houghton, Mich., 'Mort' Senter is considered by many the finest end the West has ever produced. In accepting the position he assured the men that if hard work could produce it, our next year's team will be as good as this year's.

The Chicago Daily Tribune praised the selection of Senter:

'Mort' Senter, as he is familiarly known, is one of the most dashing and reckless players in the country. He is a hard tackler, a fine interferer, and one of the best ground gainers on the team. He has the confidence of his men, and will make a good Captain.

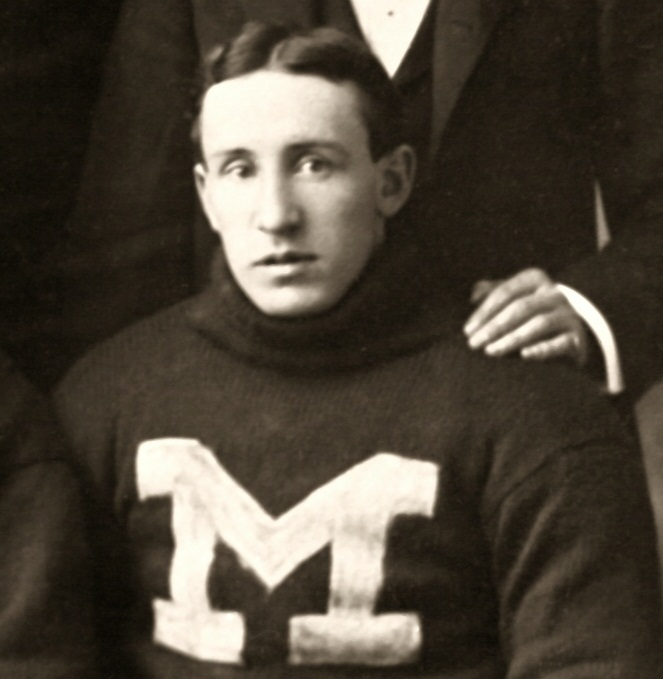
Senter in 1895

During the summer of 1896, Senter suffered from a severe illness and a serious ankle injury. As a result, Senter was kept out of most of Michigan's games in 1896. Despite being sidelined, the Chicago Daily Tribune wrote of his success as captain: "Capt. Senter has been Michigan's star end for the last two years, and this season has proven him one of the most popular and most able Captains ever in authority at Ann Arbor." The 1896 team, with Senter as captain, started the season with nine consecutive wins in which the Wolverines outscored their opponents by a combined score of 256 to 4. In the final game of the season, played on Thanksgiving Day at the Chicago Coliseum, the team lost a close game to Amos Alonzo Stagg's University of Chicago team by a score of 7–6. The 1896 Michigan–Chicago game was the first college football game played indoors, and the last portion of the game was also played under electric lights. However, in November 1896, Senter prevailed upon the team to select a new captain, and Frank Villa was selected to serve as captain for the remaining games.

Senter was also a member of the Phi Delta Theta fraternity while studying at Michigan.

== Colombia ==
In April 1897, Senter applied for a United States passport, indicating that he intended to be abroad for two years. In January 1898, The Michigan Alumnus reported that Senter had moved to South America "where he owns and operates a great coffee plantation." He settled in Santa Marta, Colombia and conducted business as a coffee planter and lumberman. In December 1901, he published an article titled "Business Opportunities in South America" in which he extolled the climate and business opportunities in South America for men of capital.

In November 1900, Senter was interviewed by the Detroit Free Press about the difficulties doing business in Colombia during the country's Thousand Days' War. In 1902, the Colombian military expropriated certain property from Senter's home (including a horse, a mule and $300 in gold), prompting a diplomatic incident that involved United States Secretary of State John Hay and the Colombian Secretary of War Beaupre. Senter described the events in a May 1902 letter to the U.S. Consul: "The numerous inconveniences and insults we foreigners have been subjected to lately in Santa Marta have culminated in the forcible entry of our houses and the taking therefrom of our personal property." Senter urged the Consul to send a ship for the protection of Americans, and in June 1902, the U.S. Consul wrote a letter to the Acting Secretary of State requesting the dispatch of a man-of-war to the port of Santa Marta. The Consul continued:

You will note by the inclosed letters that a very disturbed condition of affairs exists in Santa Marta, Colombia, which is at present occupied by a large force of Government troops. Messrs. Senter and Edwurn are American citizens engaged in business near the town and reside in said place. It is evident that the civil authorities are unable to control the troops, and it would therefore seem important that the United States should take some appropriate measure to command respect and afford protection to the American residents there.

The incident culminated in an exchange of letters between American Secretary of State Hay and Colombian Secretary of War Beaupre that were included in the State Department's 1902 report to Congress on the year's significant diplomatic incidents.

Despite the incident, Senter continued to do business in Colombia for several years. In June 1903, Senter was a passenger on the S.S. Adirondack sailing from Santa Marta to New York. His occupation was listed as a merchant. In July 1909, Senter was a passenger on the S.S. Allegheny sailing from Santa Marta to New York. His occupation was listed as a lumberman. In May 1914, he was a passenger on the S.S. Graecia sailing from Puerto, Colombia, to New York. At that time, he was identified as a U.S. citizen residing in Barranquilla, Colombia. In February 1915, he was a passenger on the S.S. Pastores sailing from Cristobol in the Canal Zone to New York. His permanent United States address was listed as Houghton, Michigan.

== Later years ==
Senter later owned about 1,400 acres in northwestern Arkansas. He was married to Grace Bethine Hall in approximately 1918. In a Draft Registration Card dated September 1918, Senter listed his permanent home address in Eureka Springs, Arkansas, and stated that he was employed as a farmer in Beaver Township, Carroll County, Arkansas. At the time of the 1920 United States census, he was living in Beaver Township with his wife Grace H. Senter (age 31 in 1920). His occupation was listed as a farmer on a stock farm.

He later moved to Mexico where he managed a large plantation for several years. He subsequently moved to California, where he died in approximately 1934.
