= Regents Field =

Former football field in Ann Arbor, Michigan

Ferry Field
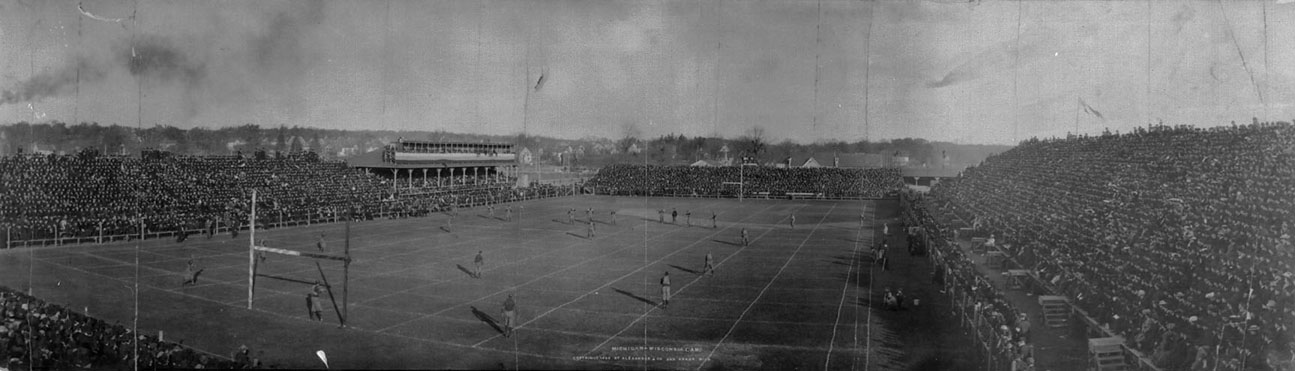
- The stadium during a game in 1905
- Former names: Athletic Field (1893); Regents Field (1894–1902)
- Owner: University of Michigan
- Capacity: 400 (1893–95); 800 (1896); 6,800 (1897–99); 15,000 (1900–05)

Construction
- Opened: 1893
- Demolished: 1923; 103 years ago
- Cost: $4,000 ($140,000 inflation adjusted)

Tenant
- Michigan Wolverines football (1893–1905)

Ferry Field (known as Regents Field before 1902) was the home field for the University of Michigan football team from 1893 to 1905. It was located along South State Street in Ann Arbor, Michigan, where Schembechler Hall stands today.

The Board of Regents of the University of Michigan authorized $3,000 in 1890 (equivalent to $110,000 in 2025) for the purchase of land to build a new football field. The following May, they added $4,500 more (equivalent to $160,000 in 2025) "for the purpose of fitting up the athletic field." The facility was simply named "the Athletic Field" upon completion. The first home game at the Athletic Field was a 6–0 victory over the Detroit Athletic Club on October 7, 1893.

The following year in 1894, the Athletic Association change the name of the field to "Regents Field", which it would be known as until 1902.

In 1902, Detroit businessman Dexter M. Ferry donated the land immediately north of Regents Field to the university. In June 1902, Regents Field was renamed Ferry Field.

When it opened, Ferry Field had a single wooden bleacher section that seated 400 people. The bleachers burned down in 1895 and were replaced the following year with a new covered grandstand seating 800. Because of the demand for tickets, additional open bleachers seating about 6,000 were built adjoining the covered grandstand. The Athletic Association also had "one thousand circus seats and materials for sloping platforms which will permit 8,000 more people to view a football game." Bleachers were later constructed along the south side of the field and the end zones, bringing capacity to over 15,000. The largest crowd ever at Ferry Field was for the second to last game at the old stadium. By one account, 17,000 fans watched the Wolverines defeat Wisconsin in the 1905 homecoming game.

In the 1890s a three dollar membership in the Athletic Association gained students admission to all athletic events. By 1904 a general admission ticket cost $3.00.

Michigan compiled an overall record of 87–2–3 at Ferry Field from 1893 to 1905. Between 1901 and 1904, Fielding H. Yost's "Point-a-Minute" teams went 44–0 at Ferry Field, outscoring their opponents 2,821–42.

In 1904, the Wolverines beat the undefeated University of Chicago team (coached by Amos Alonzo Stagg) at Ferry Field. Portions of the game and several panoramic shots of the field were filmed by the Edison Manufacturing Company in one of the earliest successful attempts to film a football game.

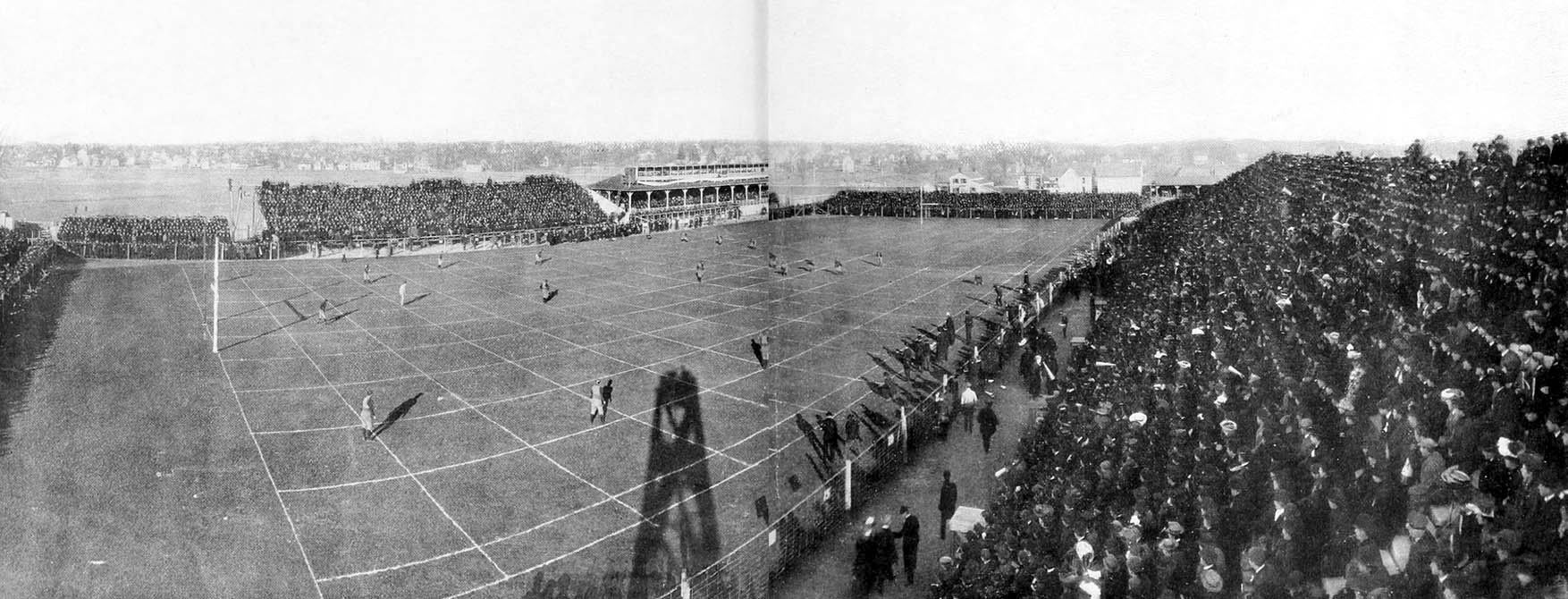
Photograph taken from a specially erected platform prior to kick-off in the 1904 Michigan–Chicago game at Regents Field.

== See also ==
- Ferry Field
- Michigan Wolverines football
