= List of people from Peoria, Illinois =

The following list includes notable people who were born or have lived in Peoria, Illinois.

For a similar list organized alphabetically by last name, see the category page People from Peoria, Illinois.

== Authors and academics ==
- Caroline Brown Bourland, college professor
- Dorothy Cannell, mystery author
- Philip José Farmer, science fiction and fantasy author
- Betty Friedan, feminist author (The Feminine Mystique)
- Kendall Gott, author and historian
- Joseph C. Hafele, physicist
- John Grier Hibben, President of Princeton University
- Kate Klise, children's book author
- David P. Schmitt, Personality psychologist who taught at Bradley University for 22 years
- Dan Simmons, author (Hyperion Cantos series)
- Morris Kleiner, economist and professor

== Business, engineering, and medicine ==
- Bruce Borland, golf course designer for Jack Nicklaus; died in a 1999 plane crash with Hall of Famer Payne Stewart
- John Coleman, meteorologist and weatherman; founder of The Weather Channel
- Thomas D. Duane, Ophthalmologist who first described valsalva retinopathy in 1972.
- Joseph B. Greenhut, Inventor
- George D. Sax, entrepreneur; credited with the innovation of drive-through banking

== Media and arts ==
- Bill Ballance, radio host
- Mark Staff Brandl, artist
- Adam Tod Brown, comedian and podcaster
- Will Burkart, comedian
- Charles Correll, performer (Amos and Andy radio show)
- Mariclare Costello, actress
- Lee Garmes, cinematographer
- Harry Harrison, radio host, disc jockey
- Teck Holmes, actor, rapper, former Direct Effect host; The Real World: Hawaii cast member
- Tom Irwin, actor; founding member of the Steppenwolf Theatre Company
- Jim and Marian Jordan, radio performers (Fibber McGee and Molly)
- Sam Kinison, comedian and actor
- Tami Lane, makeup artist; Academy Award winner for The Chronicles of Narnia: The Lion, the Witch and the Wardrobe
- Camryn Manheim, actress
- Kathryn McGuire, actress
- James Millhollin, character actor; born in Peoria
- David Ogden Stiers, actor (Major Charles Emerson Winchester III on M*A*S*H)
- Angie Ostaszewski, a TikToker who promotes relocating to Peoria.
- Richard Pryor, comedian and actor
- Cynthia Stone, actress and wife of Jack Lemmon
- Sander Vanocur, television news journalist
- Marty Wombacher, writer, photojournalist, blogger

=== Music ===
- Jon Daker, singer and star of the early viral YouTube video "My Name is Jon Daker"
- Dan Fogelberg, musician
- Jerry Hadley, opera tenor
- Bruce Johnston, member of the Beach Boys; born in Peoria, then adopted and moved to Chicago and Los Angeles
- Julia H. Johnston, Christian songwriter who composed Grace Greater Than All Our Sin
- Tim Kelley, recipient of Key To The City of Peoria; Grammy Award-winning record producer; half of the production duo Tim & Bob
- Cristy Lane, singer
- Elaine "Spanky" McFarlane, lead singer for Spanky and Our Gang; replaced Cass Elliot in The Mamas & the Papas
- Abbie Parker, member of the contemporary Christian music band I Am They
- Gary Richrath, guitarist from REO Speedwagon; raised in East Peoria
- Bob Robinson, recipient of Key To The City of Peoria; Grammy Award-winning record producer; half of the production duo Tim & Bob
- Bart Shatto, featured vocalist with Trans-Siberian Orchestra
- Fred Stobaugh, 96-year-old widower; wrote a love letter that became the viral video "Oh Sweet Lorraine"
- Greg X. Volz, lead singer of Christian rock band Petra
- Richard A. Whiting, composer
- Mike Somerville, lead guitarist, songwriter for rock band Head East
- Emile Ghantous, record producer and songwriter

=== Bands ===
- The Forecast, indie rock band
- Minsk, metal band
- Mudvayne, metal band
- Planes Mistaken for Stars, punk and hardcore band

== Philanthropists and activists ==
- Lydia Moss Bradley, Philanthropist, Bank President, and founder of Bradley University
- Howard Brown, founder of the National Gay Task Force
- Mark Clark, Black Panther; killed in infamous Chicago police raid in 1969
- Janet Glavin, Make-A-Wish Illinois
- Susan G. Komen, namesake of Susan G. Komen for the Cure

== Military ==
- General Wayne A. Downing, US Special Operations Commander and Joint Special Operations Commander; 75th Ranger Regiment
- General John M. Shalikashvili, former Chairman of the Joint Chiefs of Staff
- Edward W. Snedeker, decorated Marine General
- Frank Wead, US Navy aviator turned screenwriter; early promoter of US Naval aviation

== Politics and law ==
- Prescott E. Bloom, Illinois state senator
- Nancy Brinker, founder of Susan G. Komen for the Cure; Chief of Protocol of the United States; U.S. Ambassador to Hungary
- Jefferson R. Boulware, Illinois state representative and lawyer
- Nikki Budzinski, U.S. representative for Illinois
- Robert L. Burhans, Illinois state legislator and lawyer
- John Edward Cassidy, Illinois Attorney General
- Joseph E. Daily, Chief Justice of Illinois Supreme Court
- William L. Eagleton, US diplomat
- Sherman W. Eckley, legislator and businessman
- Susan Fargo, Massachusetts state senator
- Colonel Robert G. Ingersoll, controversial orator; Illinois Attorney General
- Garrett D. Kinney, state treasurer
- Raja Krishnamoorthi, Representative of Illinois's 8th congressional district
- Darin LaHood, U.S. representative for Illinois
- Ray LaHood, Representative of Illinois's 18th congressional district; Secretary of Transportation under President Obama
- James B. McCoy, Wisconsin state legislator
- Robert H. Michel, longest-serving Republican leader of U.S. House of Representatives
- Robert Dale Morgan, US federal judge and mayor of Peoria
- Norman H. Purple, Illinois Supreme Court justice and lawyer
- Don Saltsman, state legislator
- Aaron Schock, former US Congressman
- Robert Scholes, state legislator and lawyer
- Fred J. Schraeder, Illinois state legislator and businessman
- Daniel R. Sheen, Illinois state legislator and lawyer
- Helen J. Stewart, first Postmaaster of Las Vegas, Nevada
- David Sills, former mayor of Irvine, California and son-in-law to President Ronald Reagan
- Hudson R. Sours, Illinois state legislator
- Clyde E. Stone, Chief Justice of Illinois Supreme Court
- Fred J. Tuerk, Illinois state legislator
- Hubert W. Woodruff, Illinois state legislator and lawyer

== Religion ==
- Gerald Thomas Bergan, clergyman of the Roman Catholic Church
- Rabbi David Hirsch, Rosh Yeshiva of Rabbi Isaac Elchanan Theological Seminary, an affiliate of Yeshiva University
- Kent Hovind, Christian creationist; convicted of 58 federal counts involving money fraud
- Julia H. Johnston, Christian songwriter who composed Grace Greater Than All Our Sin
- William Lane Craig, Christian apologist and philosopher
- Henry J. Messing, rabbi
- Archbishop Fulton J. Sheen, bishop of Rochester and host of The Catholic Hour on radio and Life is Worth Living

== Sports ==
=== Baseball ===
- Amy Irene Applegren, pitcher and infielder in All-American Girls Professional Baseball League
- Charlie Bartson, pitcher for Chicago Pirates
- Harry Bay, outfielder for Cincinnati Reds and Cleveland Bronchos/Naps
- Lynn Brenton, pitcher for Cleveland Indians and Cincinnati Reds
- Ben Caffyn, outfielder for Cleveland Naps
- Mike Donlin, outfielder for several Major League Baseball teams
- Dan Dugdale, catcher for Kansas City Cowboys and Washington Senators
- Elizabeth Farrow, pitcher in All-American Girls Professional Baseball League
- Harry Frazee, owner of Boston Red Sox who traded Babe Ruth to the New York Yankees
- Norwood Gibson, pitcher for Boston Americans
- Tom Gilles, pitcher for Toronto Blue Jays
- June Gilmore, outfielder in All-American Girls Professional Baseball League
- Joe Girardi, MLB catcher and manager of New York Yankees, 3-time World Series champion, raised in East Peoria
- Irene Kerwin, catcher in All-American Girls Professional Baseball League, born in Peoria, member of three Halls of Fame
- Esther Lyman, catcher in All-American Girls Professional Baseball League, born in Peoria
- Chris Mabeus, pitcher for Milwaukee Brewers
- Zach McAllister, pitcher for Cleveland Indians, raised in Chillicothe, Illinois
- Zach Monroe, pitcher for New York Yankees
- Darby O'Brien, outfielder for New York Metropolitans and Brooklyn Bridegrooms/Grooms; born in Peoria
- Leo Schrall, baseball head coach at Bradley University
- Allyn Stout, pitcher for St. Louis Cardinals, Cincinnati Reds, New York Giants, and Boston Braves; born in Peoria
- Lee Thomas, All-Star player for six MLB teams, general manager of Philadelphia Phillies; born in Peoria
- Jim Thome, first baseman for Chicago White Sox, Cleveland Indians and other teams; born and raised in Peoria
- Walter Thornton, outfielder and pitcher for Chicago Cubs
- Bill Tuttle, center fielder for three MLB teams; born and raised in Cramer, 18 miles west of Peoria
- Pete Vonachen, owner of Peoria Chiefs minor league club; born and raised in Peoria
- George Whiteman, outfielder for Boston Americans, New York Yankees and Boston Red Sox; World Series champion (1918); born in Peoria
- Ben Zobrist, 2nd baseman for Chicago Cubs, World Series Champion (2016), voted MVP; born in Peoria

=== Basketball ===
- Acie Earl, power forward selected by Boston Celtics with 19th overall pick in 1993 NBA draft
- Ray Giacoletti, head coach, University of Utah, Drake, Eastern Washington, North Dakota State
- AJ Guyton, point guard selected by Chicago Bulls with 32nd overall pick in 2000 NBA draft
- Charlotte Lewis, 1976 Olympic silver medalist, ISU sports Hall of Fame
- Shaun Livingston, guard for NBA champion Golden State Warriors, 4th overall pick in 2004 NBA draft
- Sergio McClain, NBA D-League forward for Asheville Altitude and University of Illinois
- Carla McGhee, basketball forward, gold medalist at 1996 Summer Olympics
- Howard Nathan, point guard for Atlanta Hawks
- Brian Randle, power forward for University of Illinois and Euroleague team Maccabi Tel Aviv B.C.
- Jamar Smith, guard for Euroleague team Limoges CSP
- J. R. Koch, professional basketball player
- Dick Versace, head coach for Detroit Pistons and Indiana Pacers; NBA executive; head coach for Bradley University basketball in Peoria
- Frank Williams, point guard for University of Illinois, 25th overall pick in 2002 NBA draft

=== Football ===
- Darryl Ashmore, offensive tackle for Los Angeles/St. Louis Rams, Oakland Raiders and Washington Redskins; cousin of Carla McGhee
- Dick Jauron, NFL defensive back, head coach for Buffalo Bills and Chicago Bears
- Sherrick McManis, cornerback for Chicago Bears
- Jeff Monken, football head coach for Army
- Tim Simpson, offensive guard for Pittsburgh Steelers; raised in East Peoria
- Mike Zimmer, head coach for Minnesota Vikings
- Kendrick Green, offensive guard for Illinois and current center for the Pittsburgh Steelers
- Eddie Sutter, NFL Linebacker, played for Cleveland Browns, Baltimore Ravens, and Atlanta Falcons, Went to Richwoods Highschool.

=== Sports media ===
- Jack Brickhouse, broadcaster; radio-TV announcer of the Chicago Cubs
- Ralph Lawler, broadcaster; radio-TV announcer of the Los Angeles Clippers
- Jack Quinlan, broadcaster, radio announcer of the Chicago Cubs
- Lyall Smith, sports columnist, editor and PR director of the Detroit Lions, alumnus of Bradley University
- Charley Steiner, broadcaster, radio-TV announcer of the Los Angeles Dodgers, alumnus of Bradley University
- Rick Telander, sports columnist for the Chicago Sun-Times; panelist on Sportswriters on TV

=== Other sports ===
- Amanda Adkins, swimmer who competed in the 2000 Summer Olympics
- Vince Cicciarelli, soccer midfielder and forward
- Irv Hoerr, IMSA sports car racing champion
- Herbert Jamison, sprinter; silver medalist in the 1896 Summer Olympics
- Bobby McGrath, professional billiards player
- Lorene Ramsey, Pioneer for women's athletics and college coach in multiple sports
- Jeff Salzenstein, tennis player
- Matt Savoie, Olympic figure skater; bronze medalist (2006)
