= Wombacher =

Wombacher is a surname. Notable people with the surname include:

- John Wombacher (1876–1953), American football player
- Marty Wombacher (born 1957/1958), American writer and photojournalist
