= Eckley =

Eckley may refer to:

== Places ==
United States

- Eckley, California
- Eckley, Colorado
- Eckley Miners' Village, historical mining town in Pennsylvania

== People with the surname ==
- Harvey J. Eckley (1845–1922), American politician and judge from Ohio
- Ryan Eckley (born 2004), American football player
- Sherman W. Eckley (1866–1928), American politician
