= 1896 Western Conference football season =

American college football season

- Sport: Football
- Number of teams: 7
- Champion: Wisconsin

Football seasons
- 1897 →

1896 Western Conference football standings
	Conf.					Overall
Team	W		L		T	W		L		T
Wisconsin $	2	–	0	–	1	7	–	1	–	1
Michigan	2	–	1	–	0	9	–	1	–	0
Northwestern	2	–	1	–	1	6	–	1	–	2
Chicago	3	–	2	–	0	15	–	2	–	1
Minnesota	1	–	2	–	0	8	–	2	–	0
Illinois	0	–	2	–	1	4	–	2	–	1
Purdue	0	–	2	–	1	4	–	2	–	1
$ – Conference champion

The 1896 Western Conference football season was the first season of college football played by the member schools of the Western Conference (later known as the Big Ten Conference) and was a part of the 1896 college football season.

In September 1896, the members of the Western Conference, seven of the most prominent teams in the Midwest, arranged their schedules so as to "compete for the championship of the West."

The 1896 Wisconsin Badgers football team, under head coach Philip King, won the first Western Conference championship with a 7–1–1 record (2–0–1 against conference opponents). Wisconsin's sole loss was to the Carlisle Indians in a night game played indoors and under the lights at the Chicago Coliseum before a crowd of 16,000 persons.

Michigan, led by head coach William Ward, compiled a 9–1 record and led the conference in both scoring offense (26.2 points per game) and scoring defense (1.1 points per game). Michigan started the season with nine consecutive wins in which the Wolverines outscored their opponents by a combined score of 256 to 4. In the final game of the season, Michigan lost to Chicago by a score of 7–6. The 1896 Chicago–Michigan football rivalry game was the first college football game played indoors, and the last portion of the game was also played under electric lights.

Northwestern finished in third place with a 6–1–2 record, its only loss coming against Chicago by an 18–6 score.

In their fifth season under head coach Amos Alonzo Stagg, the Chicago Maroons compiled a 15–2–1 record, finished in fourth place in the conference with a 3–2 record against conference opponents, and outscored all opponents by a combined total of 368 to 82.

== Season overview ==
=== Results and team statistics ===
Conf. Rank	Team	Head coach	Overall record	Conf. record	PPG	PAG
1	Wisconsin	Philip King	7–1–1	2–0–1	22.9	3.3
2	Michigan	William Ward	9–1	2–1	26.2	1.1
3	Northwestern	Alvin H. Culver	6–1–2	2–1–1	17.3	5.1
4	Chicago	Amos A. Stagg	15–2–1	3–2	20.4	4.6
5	Minnesota	Alexander Jerrems	8–2	1–2	16.8	2.4
6 (tie)	Illinois	George Huff	4–2–1	0–2–1	21.1	5.1
6 (tie)	Purdue	Samuel Hammond	4–2–1	0–2–1	17.4	8.6

Key

PPG = Average of points scored per game
PAG = Average of points allowed per game

=== Regular season ===
Only 12 conference games were played during the 1896 Western Conference season. The results were as follows:

- October 17, 1896, Minnesota defeated Purdue, 14-0, before a crowd of 3,500 in Minneapolis
- October 24, 1896, Michigan defeated Purdue, 16-0, in Lafayette, Indiana
- October 24, 1896, Northwestern defeated Chicago, 46-6
- October 31, 1896, Chicago defeated Illinois, 12-0, at Marshall Field in Chicago
- November 7, 1896, Michigan defeated Minnesota, 6-4, in Minneapolis
- November 7, 1896, Northwestern defeated Illinois, 10-4, in Champaign, Illinois
- November 7, 1896, Wisconsin defeated Chicago, 24-0, at Camp Randall in Madison, Wisconsin
- November 14, 1896, Chicago defeated Northwestern, 18-6
- November 21, 1896, Wisconsin defeated Minnesota, 6-0, at Camp Randall in Madison
- November 26, 1896, Illinois and Purdue tied, 4-4, before a crowd of 2,000 in Lafayette, Indiana
- November 26, 1896, Chicago defeated Michigan, 7-6, at Chicago Coliseum
- November 26, 1896, Wisconsin and Northwestern tied, 6-6, in Evanston, Illinois

Notable non-conference games during the 1896 season included the following:

- October 10, 1896, Chicago defeated Iowa by a 6–0 score at Chicago.
- October 14, 1896, Chicago defeated Notre Dame by an 18–0 score at South Bend, Indiana.
- October 17, 1896, Illinois defeated Missouri by a 10–0 score at St. Louis.
- October 24, 1896, Minnesota defeated Iowa Agricultural by an 18–6 score at Minneapolis.
- October 31, 1896, in the only intersectional match played by a Western Conference team, Michigan defeated Lehigh by a 40–0 score at the Detroit Athletic Club.
- November 14, 1896, Purdue defeated Notre Dame by a 28–22 at South Bend, Indiana.
- November 28, 1896, Minnesota defeated Kansas by a 12–0 score at Lawrence, Kansas.
- December 19, 1896, Wisconsin lost to Carlisle by an 18–8 score at the Chicago Coliseum.

=== Bowl games ===
No bowl games were played during the 1896 season.

== Awards and honors ==
=== All-Western players ===
In the Chicago Inter Ocean, a sports writer known as "The Man Up a Tree" published the following selections for an All-Western football team:

Position	Name	Team
End	John M. Harrison	Minnesota
End	Chester Brewer	Wisconsin
Tackle	Frank Villa	Michigan
Tackle	J. F. A. "Sunny" Pyre	Wisconsin
Guard	Harding	Minnesota
Guard	John E. Ryan	Wisconsin
Center	Pierce	Northwestern
Quarterback	Gordon Clarke	Chicago
Halfback	Jesse Van Doozer	Northwestern
Halfback	John "Ikey" Karel	Wisconsin
Fullback	Clarence Herschberger	Chicago

=== All-Americans ===
No Western Conference players were selected for the 1896 College Football All-America Team.
