= 1896 Michigan Wolverines football team =

American college football season

1896 Michigan Wolverines football
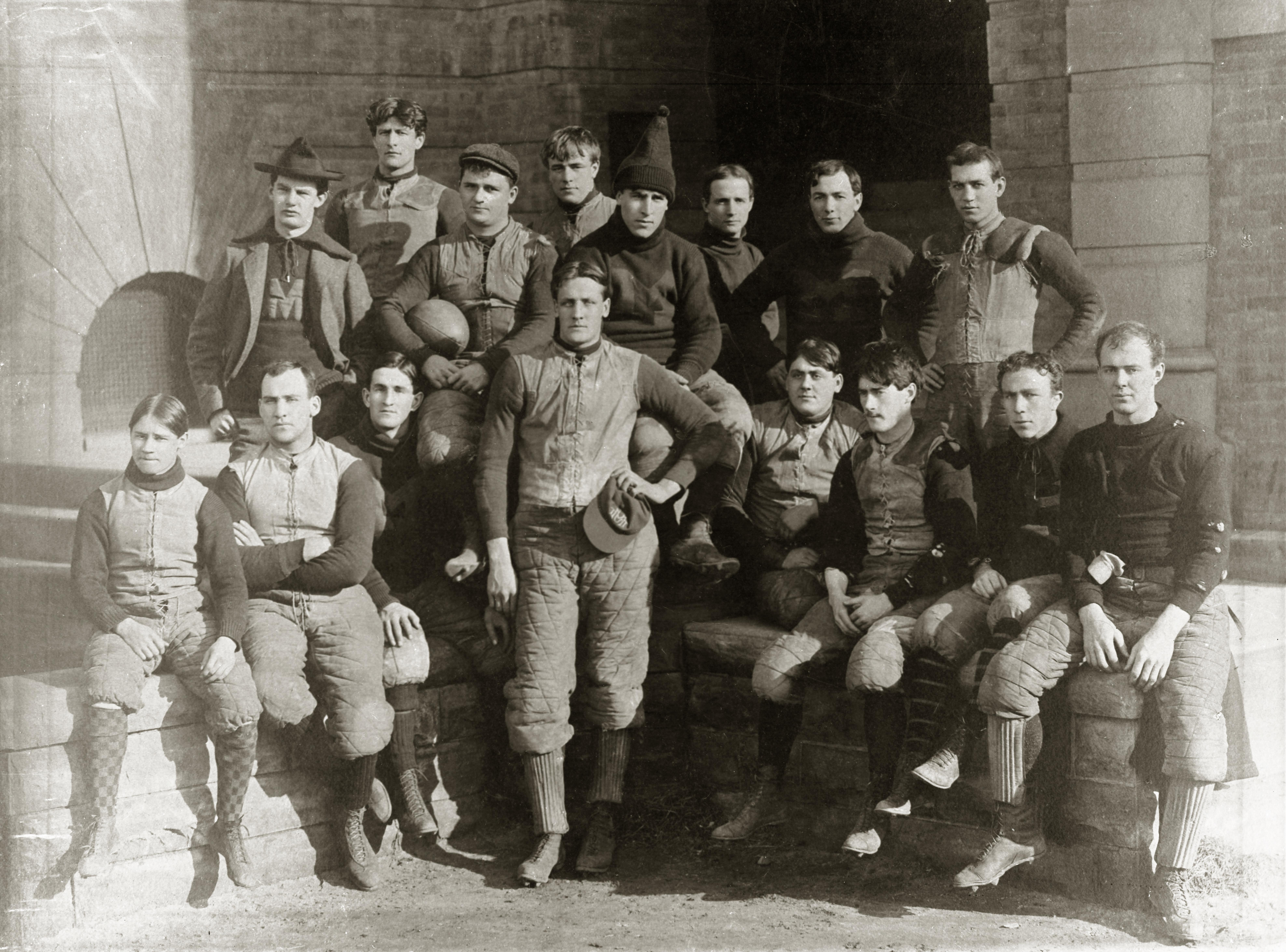
- Conference: Western Conference
- Record: 9–1 (2–1 Western)
- Head coach: William Ward (1st season)
- Captain: Henry M. Senter
- Home stadium: Regents Field

1896 Western Conference football standings
	Conf.					Overall
Team	W		L		T	W		L		T
Wisconsin $	2	–	0	–	1	7	–	1	–	1
Michigan	2	–	1	–	0	9	–	1	–	0
Northwestern	2	–	1	–	1	6	–	1	–	2
Chicago	3	–	2	–	0	15	–	2	–	1
Minnesota	1	–	2	–	0	8	–	2	–	0
Illinois	0	–	2	–	1	4	–	2	–	1
Purdue	0	–	2	–	1	4	–	2	–	1
$ – Conference champion

The 1896 Michigan Wolverines football team was an American football team that represented the University of Michigan in the 1896 Western Conference football season. In its first and only season under head coach William Ward, the team compiled a 9–1 record (2–1 against conference opponents), tied for second place in the Western Conference, and outscored opponents by a total of 262 to 11.

The team started the season with nine consecutive wins in which the Wolverines shut out eight opponents and outscored their opponents by a total of 256 to 4. In the final game of the season, played on Thanksgiving Day at the Chicago Coliseum, the team lost a close game to Amos Alonzo Stagg's Chicago Maroons by a score of 7–6. The 1896 Chicago–Michigan rivalry game was the first college football game played indoors, and the last portion of the game was also played under electric lights.

End Henry M. Senter was the team captain. Halfback Gustave Ferbert was the team's leading scorer with 56 points on six touchdowns (four points each) and 16 kicks for goal from touchdown (two points each). Tackle Frederick "Pa" Henninger led the team in touchdowns with nine. Tackle Frank Villa and halfback Hazen Pingree Jr. (whose father Hazen S. Pingree was elected Governor of Michigan during the football season) scored seven touchdowns each.

== Schedule ==
Date	Opponent	Site	Result	Attendance
October 3	Michigan State Normal*	Regents Field; Ann Arbor, MI	W 18–0	
October 10	Grand Rapids*	Regents Field; Ann Arbor, MI	W 44–0	
October 15	Chicago Physicians and Surgeons*	Regents Field; Ann Arbor, MI	W 28–0	
October 17	Lake Forest*	Regents Field; Ann Arbor, MI	W 66–0	
October 24	at Purdue	Stuart Field; West Lafayette, IN	W 16–0	2,000
October 31	Lehigh*	Detroit Athletic Club Park; Detroit, MI	W 40–0	2,000–3,000
November 7	at Minnesota	Athletic Park; Minneapolis, MN (rivalry)	W 6–4	5,000
November 14	Oberlin*	Regents Field; Ann Arbor, MI	W 10–0	1,000
November 21	Wittenberg*	Regents Field; Ann Arbor, MI	W 28–0	
November 26	at Chicago	Chicago Coliseum; Chicago, IL (rivalry)	L 6–7	15,000–20,000
*Non-conference game

== Season summary ==
=== Preseason ===
William Ward

Before the 1896 football season took the field, two developments occurred. First, Michigan joined the Western Inter-collegiate Athletic Conference (later renamed the Big Ten Conference). The 1896 season was the first for Michigan in conference play. Michigan's three conference games in 1896 were against Purdue, Minnesota and Chicago. Second, William McCauley, who had led Michigan to a 17–2–1 record in two seasons as coach, resigned as Michigan's football coach. Princeton graduate, William Ward, was hired to replace McCauley. Before leaving Ann Arbor in November 1896, McCauley assisted Ward in coaching the 1896 team.

Michigan conducted tryouts for the 1896 football team at Sand Beach. The Michiganensian for 1897 reported on the group appearing for try-outs as follows: "Never before had the Athletic field been so teeming with aspirants for foot-ball honors."

=== Game 1: Michigan State Normal ===
Michigan State Normal at Michigan

Team	1	2	Total
Michigan State Normal	0	0	0
• Michigan	12	6	18

- Date: October 3
- Location: Regents Field, Ann Arbor, MI

On October 3, 1896, Michigan defeated Michigan State Normal (later renamed Eastern Michigan University) by an 18–0 score at Regents Field in Ann Arbor, Michigan. Fletcher scored Michigan's first touchdown after 10 minutes. Hazen Pingree Jr. scored the second touchdown on an end run. William Caley kicked both goals from touchdown. Michigan led, 12–0, at halftime. In the second half, Michigan scored on a safety. Several minutes later, Henninger scored a touchdown on a three-yard run, but missed the kick for goal.

=== Game 2: Grand Rapids ===
Grand Rapids at Michigan

Team	1	2	Total
Grand Rapids	0	0	0
• Michigan	20	24	44

- Date: October 10
- Location: Regents Field, Ann Arbor, MI

On October 10, 1896, Michigan defeated a Grand Rapids team by a 44–0 at Regents Field in Ann Arbor. The Grand Rapids team was made up of high school men with the exception of McPhearson, who was the coach and played left end. The game was played in halves of 20 and 10 minutes. Frederick W. Henninger scored a touchdown after two minutes of play, but the kick for goal was missed. Three minutes later, Frank Villa scored Michigan's second touchdown, and the goal was again missed. At the 11-and-a-half minute mark, Villa scored Michigan's third touchdown, and William Caley kicked the goal. Hazen Pingree Jr. scored the fourth touchdown on a run around left end for more than 60 yards. Caley again kicked the goal, and Michigan led, 20–0, at halftime. In the second half, Michigan scored four touchdowns in 10 minutes. Michigan's second half touchdowns were scored by Henninger, Pingree, Palmer, and Thad Farnham. Charles Steele kicked all four goals from touchdown in the second half.

=== Game 3: Chicago Physicians and Surgeons ===
PChicago Physicians and Surgeons at Michigan

Team	1	2	Total
Physicians & Surgeons	0	0	0
• Michigan	12	16	28

- Date: October 15
- Location: Regents Field, Ann Arbor, MI

On Thursday, October 15, 1896, Michigan defeated the Chicago Physicians and Surgeons by a 28–0 score at Regents Field in Ann Arbor. The game was played in 15-minute halves. Villa scored Michigan's first touchdown on a 10-yard run, and Steele kicked the goal. Ferbert scored the second touchdown on a 20-yard run, Steele again kicked the goal, and Michigan led, 12–0, at halftime. Pingree scored Michigan's third touchdown six minutes into the second half. Pingree scored the fourth touchdown, and Hogg's kick for goal failed. Villa scored Michigan's fifth and final touchdown, and Hogg kicked the goal.

=== Game 4: Lake Forest ===
Lake Forest at Michigan

Team	1	2	Total
Lake Forest	0	0	0
• Michigan	26	40	66

- Date: October 17
- Location: Regents Field, Ann Arbor, MI

On October 17, 1896, Michigan defeated the team from Lake Forest College by a 66–0 at Regents Field in Ann Arbor. Michigan scored 13 touchdowns in the game: three by Gustave Ferbert, three by Edwin H. Gordon, three by Frederick W. Henninger, two by Frank Villa, and one each by Charles Juttner and Norwood Ayres. Ferbert kicked seven goals from touchdown. The game was played in halves of 25 and 15 minutes. Michigan scored 40 points in the 15-minute second half.

=== Game 5: at Purdue ===
Michigan at Purdue

Team	1	2	Total
• Michigan	6	10	16
Purdue	0	0	0

- Date: October 24
- Location: Stuart Field, West Lafayette, IN
- Game attendance: 2,000

On October 24, 1896, Michigan defeated Purdue by a 16–0 score before a crowd of 2,000 at Stuart Field in West Lafayette, Indiana. Villa scored Michigan's first touchdown, and Ferbert kicked the goal to give Michigan a 6–0 lead at halftime. In the second half, Hogg scored a touchdown, but the kick for goal missed, and Michigan led, 10–0. Late in the game, Caley scored a third touchdown for Michigan, and Ferbert kicked the goal to extend Michigan's lead to 16–0.

When the Michigan football team arrived at the Ann Arbor railway station on Sunday afternoon following the Purdue game, the players were cheered by a large crowd. The team was also greeted with red fire by Sid Millard.

=== Game 6: vs. Lehigh ===
Lehigh at Michigan

Team	1	2	Total
Lehigh	0	0	0
• Michigan	12	28	40

- Date: October 31
- Location: Detroit Athletic Club, Detroit
- Game attendance: 2,000–3,000

On October 31, 1896, Michigan defeated Lehigh by a 40–0 score. The game, played in 30-minute halves, was watched by a crowd of between 2,000 and 3,000 spectators at the Detroit Athletic Club's field in Detroit. Michigan scored seven touchdowns: four by James Hogg, two by Gustave Ferbert, and one by Frederick W. Henninger. Ferbert also kicked five goals from touchdown. Michigan also scored on a safety.

During the 60 minutes of play, the ball was in Lehigh's possession "not more than ten minutes," and most of that was in the first half. One newspaper account stated that "the Eastern boys were outclassed from start to finish." The same report noted: "The team play of the University of Michigan was excellent and the interference as good as has ever been seen in this city.

No other team defeated Lehigh so soundly. National champion Princeton scored only 16 points against Lehigh; Penn was held to 34 points; and Navy scored only 24. Because Lehigh played the top teams in the east, Michigan's large margin of victory was seen as important in measuring Michigan's standing. The 1897 Michiganensian noted: "This was the only contest with an eastern team and furnished some basis for comparison. . . . Comparison with the eastern leaders was necessarily indirect, but it can conservatively be said that at this time Michigan was playing in much the same form as the great eastern quartette."

=== Game 7: at Minnesota ===
Minnesota at Michigan

Team	1	2	Total
• Minnesota	0	6	6
Michigan	0	4	4

- Date: November 7
- Location: Athletic Park, Minneapolis
- Game attendance: 5,000

On November 7, 1896, Michigan won by a 6–4 score over previously undefeated Minnesota. The game was played in 35-minute halves before 5,000 spectators at old Athletic Park in Minneapolis. Right end Loomis Hutchinson of Michigan scored in the first half, but he was ruled offside and the touchdown was disallowed. After a scoreless first half, Michigan fullback Ignatius M. Duffy was pushed over for a touchdown in the second half, and Gustave Ferbert kicked the goal from touchdown. Michigan fans in the bleachers celebrated Duffy's touchdown with cowbells. Shortly thereafter, Minnesota scored a touchdown, but the score came at the far corner of the field where a straight kick for the goal after touchdown was impossible. Accordingly, Minnesota attempted a double kick, kicking the ball first to the fullback Loomis. Loomis caught the ball so close to the goal posts that his kick for goal "was easily stopped by Michigan players."

=== Game 8: Oberlin ===
Oberlin at Michigan

Team	1	2	Total
Oberlin	0	0	0
• Michigan	10	40	50

- Date: November 14
- Location: Regents Field, Ann Arbor, MI
- Game attendance: 1,000

On November 14, 1896, Michigan defeated Oberlin by a 10–0 score at Regents Field in Ann Arbor. Oberlin was offside on the kickoff, giving Michigan the ball at midfield. Fullback Ignatius M. Duffy scored Michigan's first touchdown, and right halfback William Caley kicked the goal to give Michigan a 6–0 lead. Later in the first half, right tackle Frederick W. Henninger was pushed over the goal line for Michigan's second touchdown, and Caley missed the kick for goal. Neither team scored in the second half. The World of New York reported that the game was seen by 1,000 persons and added: "Michigan put a substitute team against Oberlin to-day and won by making two touchdowns in the first half. Oberlin forced the fighting towards the end of the game."

=== Game 9: Wittenberg ===
Wittenberg at Michigan

Team	1	2	Total
Wittenberg	0	0	0
• Michigan	18	10	28

- Date: November 20
- Location: Regents Field, Ann Arbor, MI

On November 21, 1896, Michigan played the team from Wittenberg College, prevailing by a 28–0 score. The game was played on a mud-covered Regents Field in Ann Arbor. Michigan scored six touchdowns: three by right halfback William Caley, two by left halfback Hazen Pingree Jr., and one by right end George Greenleaf. Caley and left tackle Frank Villa each kicked one goal from touchdown. The game was played in halves of 20 and 15 minutes.

Through the first nine games, Michigan was undefeated and had scored 256 points, shut out eight opponents, and given up a total of four points.

=== Game 10: at Chicago ===
Michigan at Chicago

Team	1	2	Total
Chicago	0	6	6
• Michigan	7	0	7

- Date: November 26
- Location: Chicago Coliseum
- Game attendance: 15,000–20,000

On Thanksgiving Day, November 26, 1896, Michigan lost, 7–6, to Chicago before a crowd of between 15,000 and 20,000 persons at the Chicago Coliseum in Chicago. If Michigan had won, it would have been the Western Conference champion. The game featured "few trick plays," as both teams relied on "straight, hard football." Hazen Pingree Jr. was the star of the game for Michigan, as one newspaper reported that Pingree's effort "in the first half was the 'whole thing,' the plucky little fellow seldom failing to make the required distance." Pingree was unable to play in the second half, and Gustave Ferbert took over in the second half and "was equally effective."

Chicago's scoring came on a blocked punt resulting in a safety and a drop kicked field goal (worth five points under the rules at the time) by Clarence Herschberger from the 45–yard line. Michigan's sole touchdown came in the second half when Henninger was pushed across the goal line from the two-yard line, and Ferbert kicked the goal Michigan later drove the ball to Chicago's 15–yard line, but Michigan fumbled and Chicago recovered the ball.

The Michiganensian described the defeat as follows:

"There had been every reason to expect a victory from Chicago. Michigan had played strong and consistent foot ball throughout her schedule – Chicago had been erratic and unsteady. But there is certainly no sport more full of surprises than foot-ball, and the Thanksgiving Day contest of '96 furnished as sensational a surprise in as exciting a contest as had ever come off on a western gridiron. There was one great difference in the character of the play of the two teams. Michigan was playing her stock game of football, hard and steady, the game she could have been depended on to play at any time. Chicago seemed to have been trained and nerved to this one game. There could have been little doubt what the result of a series of contests would have been. But this one game, Chicago won by good generalship, by the most advantageous use of her greatest resource – a magnificent player in a telling place.

==== Indoor football ====
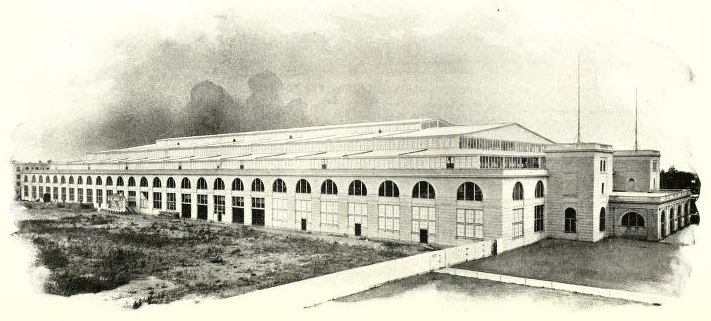
Chicago Coliseum

The most unusual feature of the Michigan-Chicago game on Thanksgiving Day was that it was played indoors at the Chicago Coliseum and was "the first collegiate game of football played under a roof." Adding to the novelty, as daylight turned to darkness, the field inside the Coliseum was lit with electric lighting. According to a newspaper account, the field grew dark in the second half, and play was halted for ten minutes to discuss whether play should continue. Play was resumed, and the lights were finally turned on after Michigan scored a touchdown.

The crowd was stated in varying press accounts to be either 15,000, or 20,000. Noting that the game was played in the same building "in which five months ago W. J. Bryan was nominated for the presidency," the press proclaimed the experiment in indoor football to be a success:

"One thing at least was settled by the game, and that is, that indoor football is literally and figuratively speaking a howling success. The men had no trouble in catching punts, and football was played on its merits, without the handicaps of a wet field or a strong wind. Toward the end of the second half it got very dark, and the spectators were treated to a novelty in the shape of football by electric light."

Another newspaper described the novelty of indoor football as follows:

"Indoor football is an innovation, but it promises to become a permanency for late games. While the other fields about Chicago were sloppy and the players were floundering about in the seas of mud, the athletes in the Coliseum played on dry surface and secure from the elements. A two-inch layer of tan bark was placed over the hard earth, and there was no inconvenience from dust. None of the punts touched the beams overhead and spectators and players were captivated with the comfortable conditions under which the game was played. Darkness came on at 4:00 and the players were scarcely distinguishable for a time, but electric lights soon rendered each play distinct."

=== After the season ===
William Ward did not return as Michigan's football coach in 1897. Ward was a Princeton alumnus who studied medicine at Michigan. He wrote: "There are many interesting things in coaching, but there are also some drawbacks and disagreeable features, so that I was glad to be through with it, and able to give myself wholly to the study of medicine." Ward became a surgeon and was a pioneer in the development of artificial vaginas.

== Personnel ==
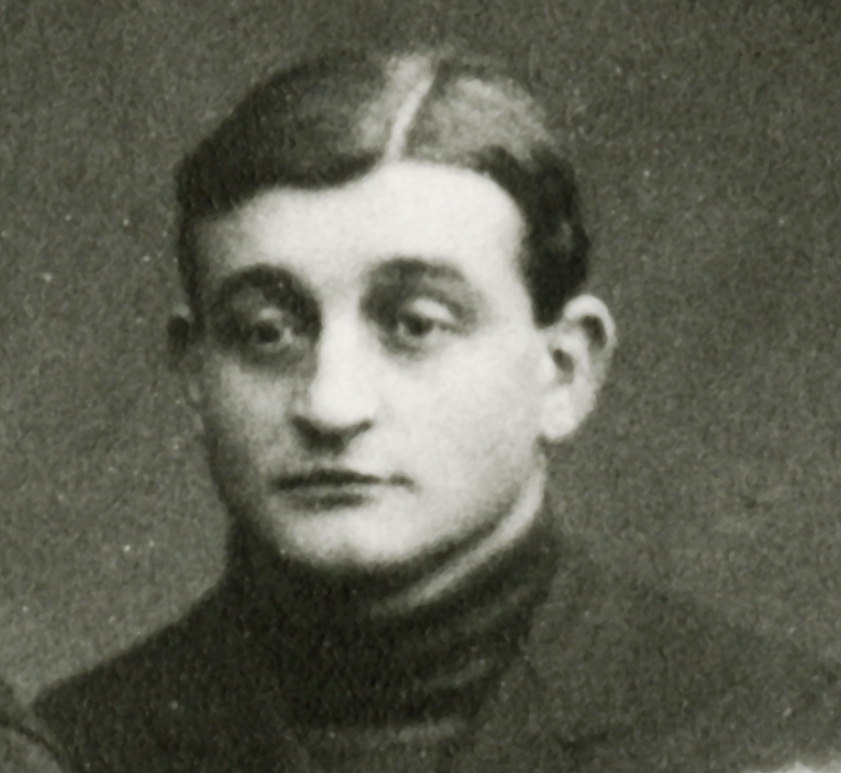
Halfback Gustave Ferbert led the team in scoring.

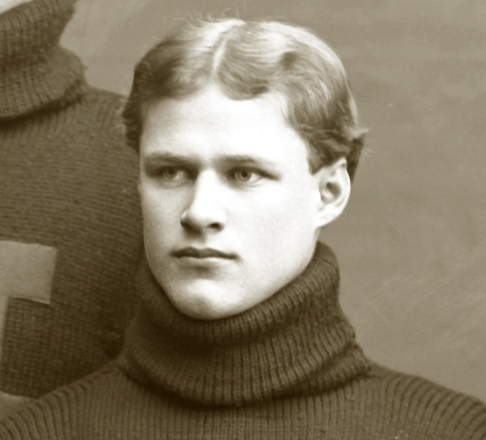
Halfback Hazen Pingree's father, Hazen S. Pingree, was elected Governor of Michigan during the 1896 football season.

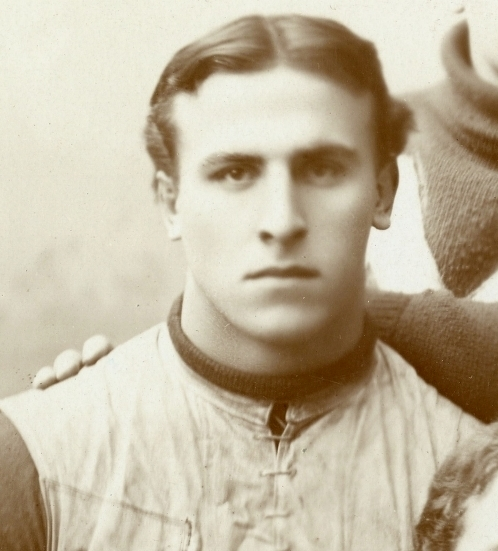
"Pa" Henninger, a tackle, led the team in touchdowns.

=== Varsity ===
The following players were members of Michigan's 1896 varsity football team.

- Norwood Ayers, substitute, Colorado Springs, Colorado
- Fred L. Baker, guard, Hillsdale, Michigan
- John W. F. Bennett, guard, Jackson, Michigan
- William Caley, halfback, Boulder, Colorado (University of Colorado)
- Bert Carr, guard, Cedar Springs, Michigan
- William Cunningham, substitute, Grove City, Pennsylvania
- Thomas Jesse Drumheller, quarterback, Walla Walla, Washington
- Ignatius M. Duffy, fullback, Ann Arbor, Michigan
- Thaddeus Loomis Farnham, end, Rosford, Ohio
- Howard C. Felver, quarterback, Batavia, Illinois
- Gustave Ferbert, halfback, Cleveland, Ohio
- George Greenleaf, end, Brazil, Indiana
- Frederick W. Henninger, tackle, Barberton, Ohio
- James R. Hogg, fullback, Knoxville, Tennessee (St. Albans Military Academy)
- Loomis Hutchinson, end, Ceresco, Michigan
- Hazen Stuart Pingree Jr., halfback, Detroit
- J. De Forest Richards, quarterback
- Henry M. Senter, end and captain, Houghton, Michigan
- Frank Villa, tackle, Walla Walla, Washington
- John Wombacher, center, Joliet, Illinois

=== Scoring leaders ===
Player	Touchdowns	Goals from TD	Field goals	Safeties	Total
Gustave Ferbert	6	16	0	0	56
Frederick W. Henninger	9	0	0	0	36
Frank Villa	7	1	0	0	30
Hazen Pingree Jr.	7	0	0	0	28
William Caley	4	6	0	0	28
James Hogg	5	1	0	0	22
Edwin H. Gordon	3	0	0	0	12
Charles Steele	0	6	0	0	12
Ignatius M. Duffy	2	0	0	0	8
Norwood Ayres	1	0	0	0	4
Thad Farnham	1	0	0	0	4
Fletcher	1	0	0	0	4
George Greenleaf	1	0	0	0	4
Charles Juttner	1	0	0	0	4
Palmer	1	0	0	0	4
na	0	2	0	1	6
Total	49	32	0	1	262

=== Coaching staff ===
- Coach: William Ward
- Assistant coach: William McCauley
- Trainer: James Robinson, hired in 1896 from his position with the Manhattan Athletic Club
- Manager: Ward W. Hughes, Charles O. Cook
