= Hawkinson =

Hawkinson is a surname. Notable people with the surname include:

- Carl Hawkinson (born 1947), American lawyer and politician
- Tanner Hawkinson (born 1990), American football player
- Tim Hawkinson (born 1960), American sculptor
