= David R. Leitch =

American politician (born 1948)

Member of the Illinois House of Representatives from the 73rd district
- In office January 11, 1989 – January 11, 2017
- Preceded by: Fred J. Tuerk
- Succeeded by: Ryan Spain

Member of the Illinois Senate from the 47th district
- In office January 31, 1986 – January 14, 1987
- Preceded by: Prescott Bloom
- Succeeded by: Carl Hawkinson

Personal details
- Born: August 22, 1948 (age 77) Three Rivers, Michigan, U.S.
- Party: Republican
- Spouse: Marlene
- Education: Kalamazoo College

David R. Leitch (born August 22, 1948) is a former American politician who served as a member of the Illinois House of Representatives for the 73rd district from 1989 to 2017. He was also a member of the Illinois Senate in 1986 and 1987.

== Early life and education ==
Leitch was born in Three Rivers, Michigan. He graduated from Kalamazoo College.

== Career ==
Prior to entering politics, Leitch worked in the baking industry.

On January 31, 1986, Leitch was appointed to the Illinois Senate to succeed the late Prescott E. Bloom. As Bloom was the only candidate to file for the 1986 Republican primary, Leitch and Carl Hawkinson both ran in the primary as write-in candidates. Hawkinson, a member of the Illinois House of Representatives, defeated Leitch by a large margin.

In 1988, Fred J. Tuerk chose to retire from the Illinois House of Representatives. Leitch won the 1988 general election for the open seat. On October 8, 2015, he announced that he would not be seeking re-election. At the time of his announcement, Representative Leitch was the most senior Republican in the Illinois House of Representatives. Ryan Spain was elected to the Illinois House of Representatives in the 2016 general election to succeed Leitch.
