= 1896 Purdue Boilermakers football team =

American college football season

1896 Purdue Boilermakers football
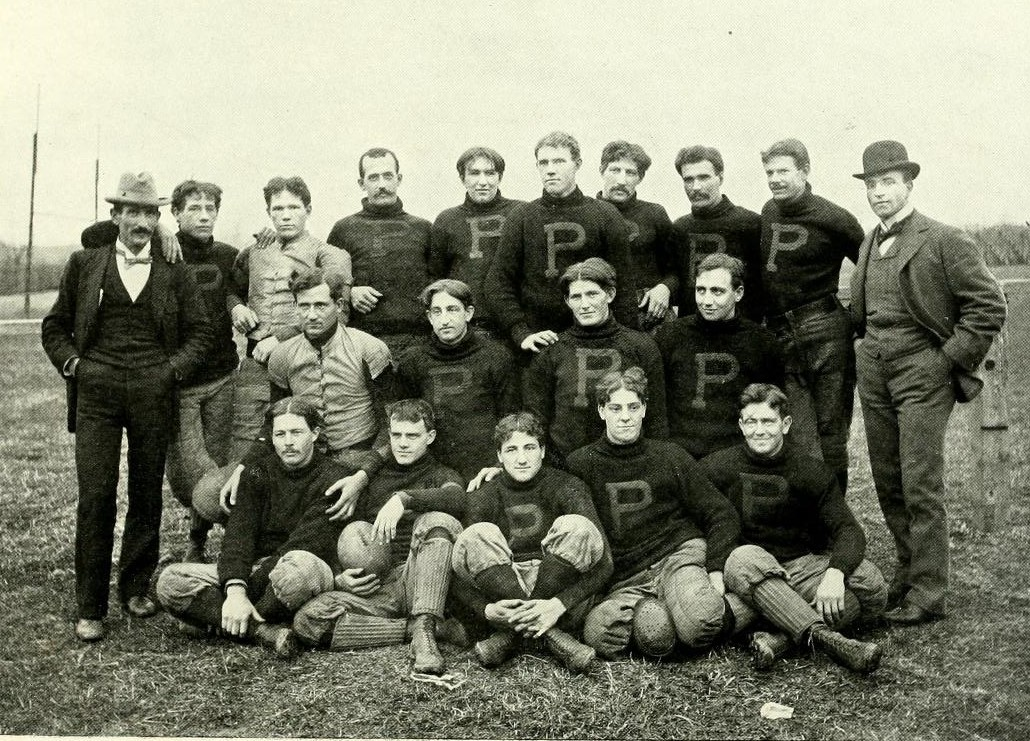
- Conference: Western Conference
- Record: 4–2–1 (0–2–1 Western)
- Head coach: Samuel M. Hammond (1st season)
- Captain: Alpha Jamison
- Home stadium: Stuart Field

1896 Western Conference football standings
	Conf.					Overall
Team	W		L		T	W		L		T
Wisconsin $	2	–	0	–	1	7	–	1	–	1
Michigan	2	–	1	–	0	9	–	1	–	0
Northwestern	2	–	1	–	1	6	–	1	–	2
Chicago	3	–	2	–	0	15	–	2	–	1
Minnesota	1	–	2	–	0	8	–	2	–	0
Illinois	0	–	2	–	1	4	–	2	–	1
Purdue	0	–	2	–	1	4	–	2	–	1
$ – Conference champion

The 1896 Purdue Boilermakers football team was an American football team that represented Purdue University during the 1896 Western Conference football season. The Boilermakers compiled a 4–2–1 record and outscored their opponents by a total of 122 to 60 in their first season under head coach Samuel M. Hammond. Alpha Jamison was the team captain.

== Schedule ==
Date	Opponent	Site	Result	Attendance	Source
October 3	Greer College*	Stuart Field; West Lafayette, IN	W 36–0		
October 10	Rush Medical*	Stuart Field; West Lafayette, IN	W 32–4		
October 17	at Minnesota	Minneapolis, MN	L 0–14	3,500	
October 24	Michigan	Stuart Field; West Lafayette, IN	L 0–16	2,000	
November 7	DePauw*	Stuart Field; West Lafayette, IN	W 22–0		
November 14	at Notre Dame*	Brownson Hall field; Notre Dame, IN (rivalry)	W 28–22		
November 26	Illinois	Stuart Field; West Lafayette, IN (rivalry)	T 4–4		
*Non-conference game

== Roster ==
- A. F. Alward, T
- Frank Bates, G
- C. F. Breen, C
- John Esterline, FB
- Fred Foulke, G
- Herm Hall, E
- William Halstead, E-HB
- Alpha Jamison, HB-FB-QB
- Sam Jump, C
- Cloyd Marshall, E-FB
- William Moore, HB
- Frank Wagner, T
- L. B. Webb, G
