= 1896 Chicago Athletic Association football team =

American football team season

1896 Chicago Athletic Association football
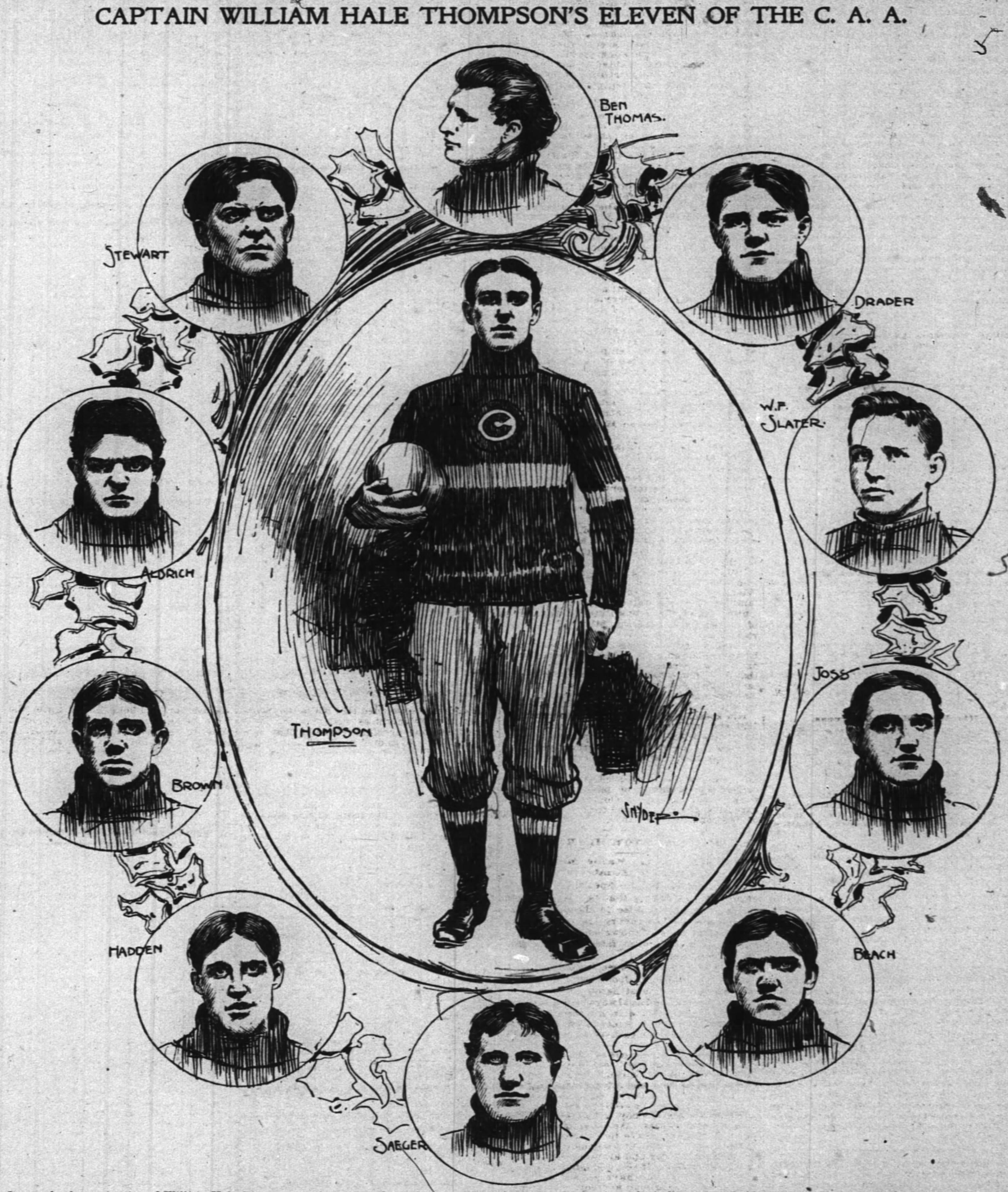
- League: Independent
- Record: 9–1–1
- Captain: William Hale Thompson
- Home field: Athletic Park

The 1896 Chicago Athletic Association football team was an American football team representing the Chicago Athletic Association (CAA). Led by captain and future Chicago mayor William Hale Thompson, the team compiled a 9–1–1 record while allowing only ten points. The team played its home games at Athletic Park, (Note: Also known as CAA Field, Athletic Field, and 35th Street Grounds, and formerly as South Side Park.) located at 35th Street and Wentworth Avenue in Chicago.

== Schedule ==
Date	Opponent	Site	Result	Source
September 12	at Waukegan Athletic Association	Waukegan, IL	W 10–0	
September 26	Proviso	Athletic Park; Chicago, IL	W 48–0 or 54–0	
October 3	at Northwestern	Northwestern Athletic Field; Evanston, IL	L 0–4	
October 10	Illinois Cycling Club	Athletic Park; Chicago, IL	T 0–0	
October 17	Chicago Dental	Athletic Park; Chicago, IL	W 66–0 or 60–0	
October 24	Indianapolis Light Artillery	Athletic Park; Chicago, IL	W 12–0	
October 31	First Regiment	Athletic Park; Chicago, IL	W 46–0 or 66–0	(Note: The Chicago Sunday Chronicle reported a score of 46–0, but its box score listed 11 touchdowns (worth 4 points each) and 11 conversion kicks (2 points each) for a total of 66 points. The same paper weeks later (November 23) gave the score of the same game as 66–0.)
November 3	Illinois Cycling Club	Athletic Park; Chicago, IL	W 34–0 or 26–0	
November 7	Indianapolis Light Artillery	Athletic Park; Chicago, IL	W 24–0	
November 21	Chicago Physicians and Surgeons	Athletic Park; Chicago, IL	W 12–0	
November 26	Boston Athletic Association	Athletic Park; Chicago, IL	W 12–6	

== Player purge ==
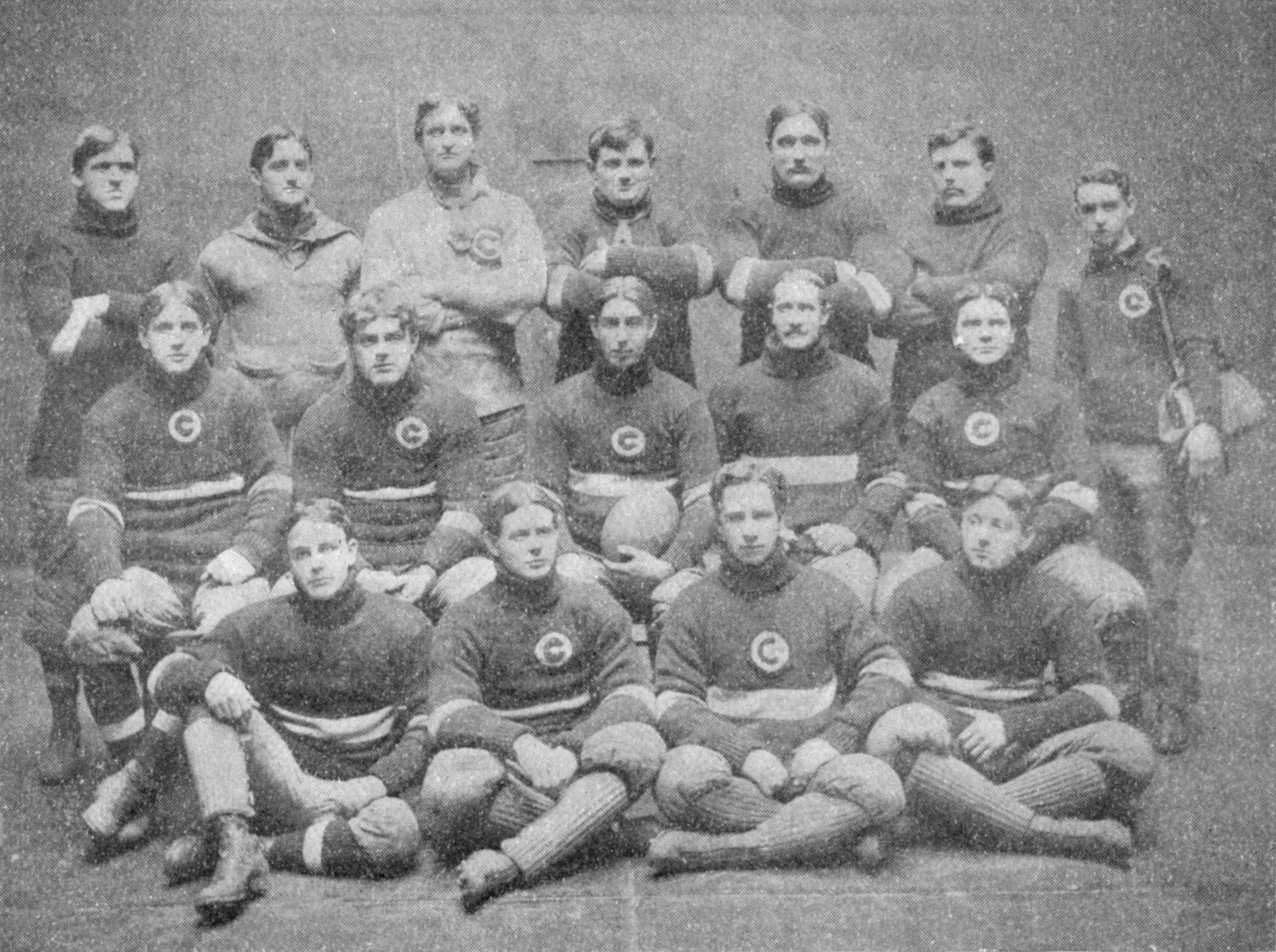
Team of late 1896 season, after several players were expelled

In mid-November, the CAA, seeking to maintain an amateur standing and to avoid any appearance of professionalism, purged from its roster six players of questionable amateur status: tackle Harry G. Hadden, end Paul G. Brown, halfback Philip S. Graver, quarterback William H. Aldrich, and guards Lee K. Stewart and Ben Thomas. With the exception of Thomas, all had traveled to Pittsburgh to temporarily play for the Allegheny Athletic Association – a suspected but not admitted professional team – in defiance of the wishes of CAA president Edwin A. Potter and Captain William Hale Thompson. Thomas, who intended to make the trip but did not because of an ailing knee or leg, received the same sentence as those who did go. The CAA at first charged the six players with insubordination and supposed professionalism, but decided not to investigate the charge of professionalism and instead expelled the players on the grounds of insubordination and conduct detrimental to the reputation of the club.

Hadden and Brown denied being paid by Allegheny. Despite their denials, the 1896 Allegheny team is recognized by the Pro Football Hall of Fame as the first completely professional football team.
