= 1896 Minnesota Golden Gophers football team =

American college football season

1896 Minnesota Golden Gophers football
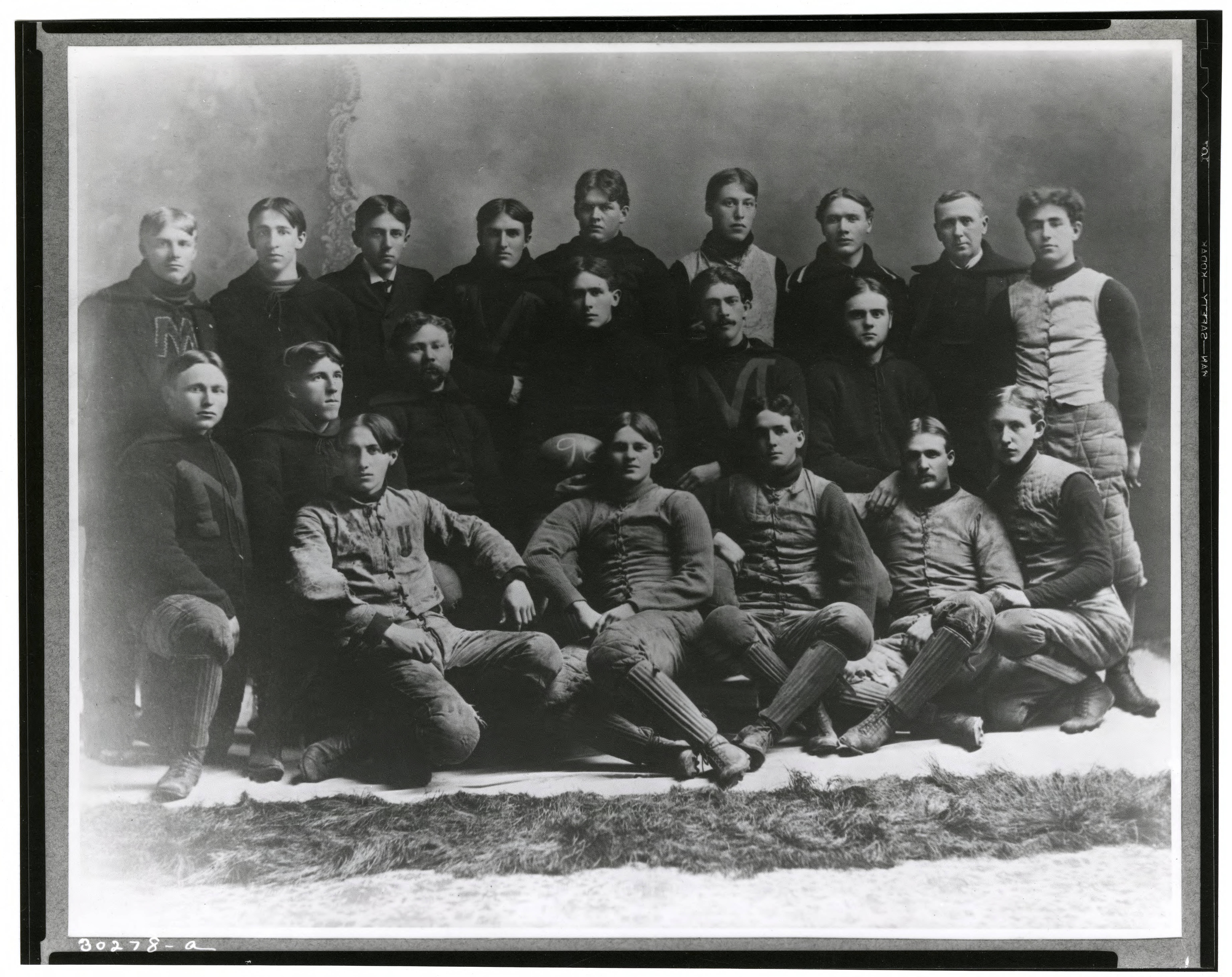
- Conference: Western Conference
- Record: 8–2 (1–2 Western)
- Head coach: Alexander Jerrems (1st season)
- Captain: Jack Harrison
- Home stadium: Athletic Park

1896 Western Conference football standings
	Conf.					Overall
Team	W		L		T	W		L		T
Wisconsin $	2	–	0	–	1	7	–	1	–	1
Michigan	2	–	1	–	0	9	–	1	–	0
Northwestern	2	–	1	–	1	6	–	1	–	2
Chicago	3	–	2	–	0	15	–	2	–	1
Minnesota	1	–	2	–	0	8	–	2	–	0
Illinois	0	–	2	–	1	4	–	2	–	1
Purdue	0	–	2	–	1	4	–	2	–	1
$ – Conference champion

The 1896 Minnesota Golden Gophers football team represented the University of Minnesota in the 1896 Western Conference football season. The 1896 season was the first season under head coach Alexander Jerrems and was the first season of competition in the Big Ten Conference, or Western Conference as it was commonly referred to at the time. Minnesota won its first ever conference game over Purdue but lost its other two matches to Michigan and Wisconsin.

== Schedule ==
Date	Time	Opponent	Site	Result	Attendance	Source
September 19		at South High School*	Minneapolis, MN	W 34–0		
September 26		Minneapolis Central High School*	Minneapolis, MN	W 50–0		
October 3		Carleton*	Minneapolis, MN	W 16–6		
October 10		Grinnell*	Minneapolis, MN	W 12–0		
October 17		Purdue	Minneapolis, MN	W 14–0	3,500	
October 24		Iowa Agricultural*	Minneapolis, MN	W 18–6		
October 31		Ex-Collegiates*	Minneapolis, MN	W 8–0		
November 7		Michigan	Athletic Park; Minneapolis, MN (rivalry)	L 4–6	5,000	
November 21		at Wisconsin	Randall Field; Madison, WI (rivalry)	L 0–6		
November 28	2:30 p.m.	vs. Kansas*	Exposition Park; Kansas City, MO	W 12–0		
*Non-conference game; All times are in Central time

== Roster ==
- Ends, Jack Harrison (captain and left end), Henry A. Scandrett (right end)
- Tackles, Ivan A. Perry (left tackle), A.M. Smith (right tackle)
- Guards, George A.E. Finlayson (left guard), Everhard P. Harding (right guard)
- Center, James C. Fulton
- Quarterbacks, George E. Cole, Richard E. Woodworth
- Halfbacks, S.W. Bagley (right half), Martin Teigen, Elbridge L. Heath (left half)
- Fullback, Harry C. Loomis
- Substitutes, Clinton L. Walker, John Taresh, Carl S. Jorgens, Lloyd Sperry, Claude Nicoulin, L. Eugene Parker, Conrad H. Christopherson
- Trainer, Edward "Dad" Moulton
- Coach, Alexander Jerrems
