= 1896 Illinois Fighting Illini football team =

American college football season

1896 Illinois Fighting Illini football
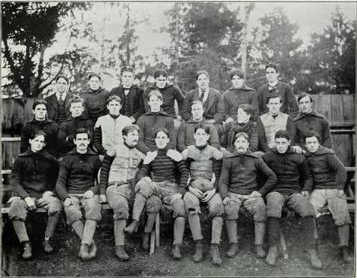
- Conference: Western Conference
- Record: 4–2–1 (0–2–1 Western)
- Head coach: George Huff (2nd season)
- Captain: Charles D. Beebe
- Home stadium: Illinois Field

1896 Western Conference football standings
	Conf.					Overall
Team	W		L		T	W		L		T
Wisconsin $	2	–	0	–	1	7	–	1	–	1
Michigan	2	–	1	–	0	9	–	1	–	0
Northwestern	2	–	1	–	1	6	–	1	–	2
Chicago	3	–	2	–	0	15	–	2	–	1
Minnesota	1	–	2	–	0	8	–	2	–	0
Illinois	0	–	2	–	1	4	–	2	–	1
Purdue	0	–	2	–	1	4	–	2	–	1
$ – Conference champion

The 1896 Illinois Fighting Illini football team was an American football team that represented the University of Illinois during the 1896 Western Conference football season. In their second season under head coach George Huff, the Illini compiled a 4–2–1 record and finished in a tie for last place in the inaugural season of the Western Conference. Guard Charles D. Beebe was the team captain.

== Schedule ==
Date	Time	Opponent	Site	Result	Source
October 3		Lake Forest*	Illinois Field; Champaign, IL	W 38–0	
October 10		Knox*	Illinois Field; Champaign, IL	W 70–4	
October 17	2:30 p.m.	vs. Missouri*	Pastime grounds at De Hodiamont; St. Louis, MO (rivalry)	W 10–0	
October 21		Oberlin*	Illinois Field; Champaign, IL	W 22–6	
October 31		at Chicago	Marshall Field; Chicago, IL	L 0–12	
November 7		Northwestern	Illinois Field; Champaign, IL (rivalry)	L 4–10	
November 26		at Purdue	Stuart Field; West Lafayette, IN (rivalry)	T 4–4	
*Non-conference game; All times are in Central time

== Roster ==
Beebe, Charles D. RG (captain); Burkland, Theo L. LE; Clinton, Edgar M. RHB/LHB; Coffeen, Harry C. FB; Fischer, Leon E. RT/LG; McKee, James H. QB; Pixley, Arthur H. LT; Rhodes, Ora M. LG; Schacht, Frederick W. RHB; Von Oven, Frederick W. RE; Zimmerman, Walter H. C	Substitutes: Alarco, Jose′ M. E; Enochs, Claude D. LE/HB; Forbes, Stuart F. LE/HB; Hodges, J.S. LG; Hughes, A.H. LHB; Jack, R.D. G/T; Johnston, Arthur R. LHB; Kennedy, R. LHB; McLane, E.C. RG; Sconce, Harvey J. LHB; Wood, Harvey E. RHB

Source: University of Illinois
