= David Hultgren =

American politician

Member of the Illinois House of Representatives from the 94th district
- In office January 6, 1987 – January 3, 1992
- Preceded by: Carl Hawkinson
- Succeeded by: Donald L. Moffitt

Personal details
- Born: April 30, 1951 (age 75) Geneseo, Illinois
- Party: Republican
- Education: Augustana College; University of North Carolina at Chapel Hill
- Profession: Attorney, Politician, Judge

David Rodger Hultgren (born April 30, 1951) is a former politician and judge in Illinois.

In 1986 he successfully ran for the Illinois House of Representatives, winning the 94th District seat. After serving three full terms, he moved into the judicial field as a judge in the 9th judicial circuit.

Hultgren retired on July 4, 2006. He has spent his retirement volunteering for a variety of conservation organizations and groups.

== Early life and education ==
Hultgren was born at the Hammond Henry Hospital in Geneseo, Illinois, to parents Rodger and Marietta. He was the second of three sons. He was baptized on Easter Sunday of April, 1952.

During his adolescence he became very interested in the outdoors. This intrigue was due in large part to his neighbor, who was highly knowledgeable about nature, specifically birding and gardening. Also important in the development of his affection for the outdoors was his maternal grandfather, who sparked his interest in fishing. Hultgren, however, due to his love of plants and animals, refused to go hunting with his grandfather.

Hultgren attended both the Cambridge Community Grade School and Cambridge High School. His leadership and political aspirations became evident through his extra-curricular activities in high school, where he was nicknamed "Senator." His freshman year he was voted as the class president. He was highly active in Teenage Republicans throughout high school, both locally and statewide. He was the first treasurer of the Henry Country TARS chapter and the second treasurer of the Illinois TARS federation. Also while in high school, Hultgren was active on the Yearbook Club and the Student Council, serving as the Student Council president his senior year. During his junior and senior years he was a member of the National Honor Society. Other organizations which he was active with were the Library Club and Future Teachers. As a senior, he was voted by his classmates as "Most Likely to Succeed" and "Most Studious." He graduated a salutatorian in 1969.

He went to Augustana College and continued his strong participation in extra-curricular activities. He was president of the College Republicans at Augustana and was also involved with the Student Judiciary Committee and the school newspaper. During the fall of 1971 Hultgren represented the college as a member of American University's Washington Semester Honors Program in the nation's capitol. He received his Bachelor of Arts degrees in both economics and political science in 1973. He graduated cum laude. He was the fourth generation to attend Augustana, but the first to graduate. While studying there, he was a part of Pi Upsilon Gamma, a local fraternity. This fraternity has since been disbanded at the college.

Hultgren proceeded to work as a budget analyst for a credit card processing company in Raleigh, North Carolina for two years. In the fall of 1975, he began graduate work at the University of North Carolina at Chapel Hill. In 1978 he graduated with academic honor and received his Doctor of Jurisprudence degree.

== Career ==
David Hultgren took and passed the Bar examination in 1978, and proceeded to acquire a job at the law firm of Stansell, Critser, and Whitman in Monmouth, Illinois. At this time he also served as a law clerk for justice Albert Scott of the Illinois Appellate Court.

Hultgren was elected into the Illinois General Assembly in 1986. He represented the Republican Party in the Illinois House of Representatives from 1987-1992. He replaced his close friend Carl Hawkinson, who decided to run for the senate. Hultgren was the spokesman for the Committee on Aging. He was also a member of numerous other committees, including:

- Elementary and Secondary Education
- Higher Education
- Transportation and Motor Vehicles

Hultgren chose to end his career in the legislature after three terms. Hoping that his skills could still be useful elsewhere, Hultgren chose to run for a circuit judge position. He won, and was sworn in on December 7, 1992. As a judge in the 9th judicial circuit, he held court in the following county seats:

- Macomb
- Carthage
- Lewistown
- Oquawka
- Monmouth
- Galesburg

Although he presided in all of these cities, he served mainly in Monmouth (1992–1999) and Lewistown (1999–2006). While in Monmouth, he served as the president of the local area Chamber of Commerce, which ultimately led to him winning the Monmouth Area Chamber of Commerce "Man of the Year" in 1989. Upon his retirement in 2006, Hultgren was honored by having his portrait hung in the courthouse in Monmouth.
