= John E. Cassidy Jr. =

American politician (1924-2003)

Member of the Illinois House of Representatives

Personal details
- Party: Democratic

John E. Cassidy, Jr. (July 22, 1924 — June 25, 2003) was a Democratic member of the Illinois House of Representatives.

== Background ==
Cassidy was born in Peoria, Illinois on July 22, 1924. He received a degree from the University of Notre Dame in Naval Science and Tactics and subsequently a Commission in the United States Naval Reserve in 1945. He served during World War II in the Pacific Theater. In 1948, he received a B.S. in accounting. While practicing as an accountant, in 1952 he received a LL.B. from the University of Illinois College of Law. He married Helen Fagan Cassidy in 1952. He and his wife had nine children and 28 grandchildren. Cassidy served as a trustee of the Peoria Park District from 1957 to 1965. In 1964, he was elected to the Illinois House of Representatives and served for two terms.

In the 1986 general election, Cassidy ran against Republican candidate and member of the Illinois House of Representatives Carl Hawkinson. Despite the hope of Democrats to capitalize on cross preasure of party affiliation and a hometown state senator to break the Republican hold on the "Peoria seat", Hawkinson won the general election.

Cassidy died June 25, 2003.
