= 1896 Wisconsin Badgers football team =

American college football season

1896 Wisconsin Badgers football
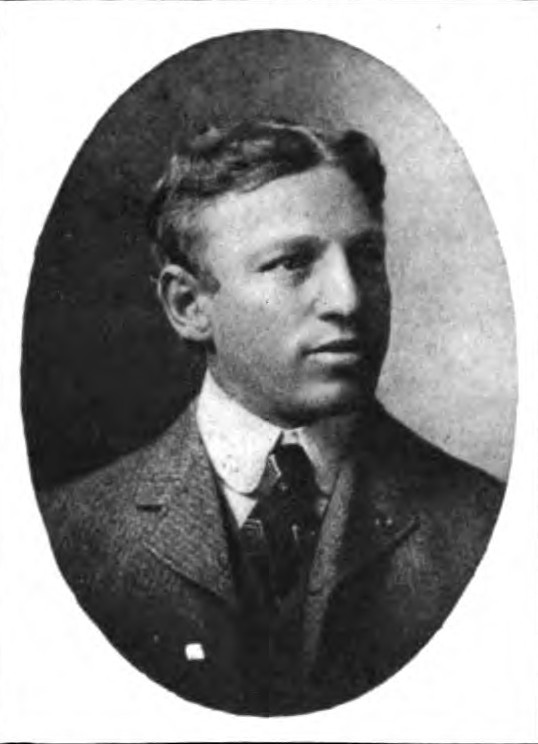
- Head coach Philip King

Western Conference champion
- Conference: Western Conference
- Record: 7–1–1 (2–0–1 Western)
- Head coach: Philip King (1st season)
- Captain: John R. Richards
- Home stadium: Randall Field

1896 Western Conference football standings
	Conf.					Overall
Team	W		L		T	W		L		T
Wisconsin $	2	–	0	–	1	7	–	1	–	1
Michigan	2	–	1	–	0	9	–	1	–	0
Northwestern	2	–	1	–	1	6	–	1	–	2
Chicago	3	–	2	–	0	15	–	2	–	1
Minnesota	1	–	2	–	0	8	–	2	–	0
Illinois	0	–	2	–	1	4	–	2	–	1
Purdue	0	–	2	–	1	4	–	2	–	1
$ – Conference champion

The 1896 Wisconsin Badgers football team represented the University of Wisconsin in the 1896 Western Conference football season. In their first season under head coach Philip King, the Badgers compiled a 7–1–1 record (2–0–1 against Western Conference opponents), shut out six of nine opponents, outscored all opponents by a combined total of 206 to 30, and won the first Western Conference championship.

Wisconsin played three conference games: a victory over Chicago (24–0) on November 7; a victory over Minnesota (6–0) on November 21; and a tie with Northwestern (6–6) on November 26. Wisconsin's sole loss was to the Carlisle Indians (18–8) in a night game played indoors and under the lights at the Chicago Coliseum before a crowd of 16,000 persons. Wisconsin did not play another night game until 1953.

Four Wisconsin players were selected to the 1896 All-Western football team published in the Chicago Inter Ocean: end Chester Brown, tackle J. F. A. "Sunny" Pyre, guard John E. Ryan, and halfback John "Ikey" Karel. John R. Richards was the team captain.

== Schedule ==
Date	Time	Opponent	Site	Result	Attendance	Source
October 10		Lake Forest*	Randall Field; Madison, WI	W 34–0		
October 14		Madison High School*	Randall Field; Madison, WI	W 18–0		
October 17		Rush Medical*	Randall Field; Madison, WI	W 50–0		
October 24		Grinnell*	Randall Field; Madison, WI	W 54–6		
October 31		at Beloit*	Athletic Park; Beloit, WI	W 6–0		
November 7		Chicago	Randall Field; Madison, WI	W 24–0		
November 21		Minnesota	Randall Field; Madison, WI (rivalry)	W 6–0		
November 26	11:00 a.m.	at Northwestern	Northwestern Athletic Field; Evanston, IL	T 6–6	5,000	
December 19	8:00 p.m.	vs. Carlisle*	Chicago Coliseum; Chicago, IL	L 8–18	16,000	
*Non-conference game
