= Thomas Jesse Drumheller =

American football player, lawyer, and sheep rancher (1873–1954)

- Born: January 18, 1873
- Died: January 28, 1954 (aged 81); Portland, Oregon
- Citizenship: United States
- Education: University of Michigan
- Known for: Football player/Sheep rancher

Thomas Jesse Drumheller (January 18, 1873 – January 28, 1954) was an American football player, lawyer and sheep rancher. He played college football as the quarterback for the University of Michigan in 1896 and was the roommate of Herbert Hoover at Stanford University. He was the son of a pioneer family of Walla Walla, Washington, and later became owner of one of the largest sheep ranches in the Pacific Northwest, with a ranch of nearly 25,000 acres. He was also the president of the Washington State Wool Growers Association from 1913 to 1948.

== Early years ==
Drumheller's father, Jesse "Curly" Drumheller, was one of the early pioneers of Walla Walla, Washington, having moved to the area as a transportation manager with the U.S. troops in the war of 1855–1856. His father became known as "an Indian fighter" and "one of the largest land holders of his county." Drumheller was born in 1873 and raised in Walla Walla.

In the 1890s, Drumheller was sent east to attend the University of Michigan. While attending Michigan, he played college football and was a quarterback for the 1896 Michigan Wolverines football team. Drumheller received a bachelor of law degree from Michigan. He also attended Stanford University, where he was a roommate of future U.S. President Herbert Hoover.

== Business and ranching career ==
Drumheller returned to the Pacific Northwest and practiced law for a time at Spokane, Washington. In 1900, he participated in the Alaska gold rush, bringing the first horses into the gold mining area. In 1902, he was described in the University of Michigan's alumni records as a farmer in Walla Walla. In the early 1900s, he also purchased the O'Donnell Hardware Company with his father Jesse and brother Oscar as partners. This business became the Drumheller Hardware Company in Walla Walla. which was run by the Drumheller family until 1987. In 1910, Tom sold his interest in the Drumheller Company and went into the sheep business. In 1937, The Michigan Alumnus reported that he was operating a large ranch near Grand Coulee Dam. Along with his son Thomas J. Drumheller, Jr., he operated a sheep ranch of 25,000 acres near Ephrata, Washington. He was a pioneering sheep rancher of eastern Washington's Inland Empire and also served as the president of the Washington State Wool Growers Association from 1913 to 1948. He had a reputation for having "a knack for getting things done in the wool industry" and an ability to "get wool growers together on important problems concerning the industry."

== Family and death ==
Drumheller married Nellie M. Day in December 1900. After his first wife died in November 1916, he married Edith Drummond in February 1921. In January 1954, Drumheller died of a heart attack at age 81. He was attending a meeting of the Northwest Livestock Production Credit Association in Portland, Oregon, at the time of his death. He was survived by his second wife, Edith, and his son, Thomas J. Drumheller, Jr.
