= 1896 Chicago Maroons football team =

American college football season

1896 Chicago Maroons football
- Conference: Western Conference
- Record: 15–2–1 (3–2 Western)
- Head coach: Amos Alonzo Stagg (5th season)
- Captain: Charles Foster Roby
- Home stadium: Marshall Field

1896 Western Conference football standings
	Conf.					Overall
Team	W		L		T	W		L		T
Wisconsin $	2	–	0	–	1	7	–	1	–	1
Michigan	2	–	1	–	0	9	–	1	–	0
Northwestern	2	–	1	–	1	6	–	1	–	2
Chicago	3	–	2	–	0	15	–	2	–	1
Minnesota	1	–	2	–	0	8	–	2	–	0
Illinois	0	–	2	–	1	4	–	2	–	1
Purdue	0	–	2	–	1	4	–	2	–	1
$ – Conference champion

The 1896 Chicago Maroons football team was an American football team that represented the University of Chicago during the 1896 Western Conference football season. In their fifth season under head coach Amos Alonzo Stagg, the Maroons compiled a 15–2–1 record, finished in fourth place in the Western Conference with a 3–2 record against conference opponents, and outscored their opponents by a combined total of 368 to 82.

== Schedule ==
Date	Opponent	Site	Result	Attendance	Source
September 12	Englewood High School*	Marshall Field; Chicago, IL	W 24–0		
September 17	Hyde Park High School*	Marshall Field; Chicago, IL	W 24–0		
September 19	Wheaton High School*	Marshall Field; Chicago, IL	W 47–0		
September 23	Englewood High School*	Marshall Field; Chicago, IL	W 12–0		
September 26	Eureka*	Marshall Field; Chicago, IL	W 46–0		
October 3	Monmouth (IL)*	Marshall Field; Chicago, IL	W 43–0		
October 5	Chicago alumni*	Marshall Field; Chicago, IL	W 5–0		
October 7	Hahnemann Medical*	Marshall Field; Chicago, IL	W 34–0		
October 10	Iowa*	Marshall Field; Chicago, IL	W 6–0		
October 14	at Notre Dame*	Brownson Hall field; Notre Dame, IN	W 18–0		
October 17	Oberlin*	Marshall Field; Chicago, IL	W 30–0		
October 21	Armour*	Marshall Field; Chicago, IL	W 36–0		
October 24	Northwestern	Marshall Field; Chicago, IL	L 6–46		
October 31	Illinois	Marshall Field; Chicago, IL	W 12–0		
November 7	at Wisconsin	Randall Field; Madison, WI	L 0–24		
November 10	Lake Forest*	Marshall Field; Chicago, IL	T 0–0		
November 14	at Northwestern	Northwestern Athletic Field; Evanston, IL	W 18–6		
November 26	Michigan	Chicago Coliseum; Chicago, IL (rivalry)	W 7–6	15,000–20,000	
*Non-conference game

== Roster ==
Player	Position
Charles Foster Roby (captain)	right tackle
Walter James Cavanagh	center
Maurice Gordon Clarke	quarterback
Harry Iris Coy	right half back
Charles Firth	left end
William Thaw Gardner	fullback
Ralph C. Hamill	right end
Clarence Bert Herschberger	left halfback
Walter Scott Kennedy	left tackle
Ernest de Koven Leffingwell	left end
Theron Ware Mortimer	left tackle
Robert Newton Tooker	right guard
Jonathan Edward Webb	left guard
Herbert Morse Burchard	substitute
Frank Clayton Cleveland	substitute
George Gilbert Davis	substitute
Carr Baker Neel	substitute
Victor Washington Sincere	substitute

- Head coach: Amos Alonzo Stagg (5th year at Chicago)
