= 1896 Northwestern Purple football team =

American college football season

1896 Northwestern Purple football
- Conference: Western Conference
- Record: 6–1–2 (2–1–1 Western)
- Head coach: Alvin H. Culver (2nd season)
- Captain: Jesse Van Doozer
- Home stadium: Northwestern Athletic Field

1896 Western Conference football standings
| | Conf. | | | | | Overall |
| Team | W | | L | | T | W | | L | | T |
|---|---|---|---|---|---|---|---|---|---|---|
| Wisconsin $ | 2 | – | 0 | – | 1 | 7 | – | 1 | – | 1 |
| Michigan | 2 | – | 1 | – | 0 | 9 | – | 1 | – | 0 |
| Northwestern | 2 | – | 1 | – | 1 | 6 | – | 1 | – | 2 |
| Chicago | 3 | – | 2 | – | 0 | 15 | – | 2 | – | 1 |
| Minnesota | 1 | – | 2 | – | 0 | 8 | – | 2 | – | 0 |
| Illinois | 0 | – | 2 | – | 1 | 4 | – | 2 | – | 1 |
| Purdue | 0 | – | 2 | – | 1 | 4 | – | 2 | – | 1 |
$ – Conference champion

The 1896 Northwestern Purple team represented Northwestern University during the 1896 Western Conference football season. In their second year under head coach Alvin H. Culver, and their first as a member of the Western Conference (later known as the Big Ten Conference), the Purple compiled a 6–1–2 record (2–1–1 against conference opponents) and finished in third place in the conference.

== Schedule ==
| Date | Opponent | Site | Result | Attendance | Source |
|---|---|---|---|---|---|
| October 1 | Englewood High School* | Northwestern Athletic Field; Evanston, IL | W 20–0 | | |
| October 3 | Chicago Athletic Association* | Northwestern Athletic Field; Evanston, IL | W 4–0 | 1,500 | |
| October 7 | Armour* | Northwestern Athletic Field; Evanston, IL | W 42–0 | | |
| October 10 | Beloit* | Northwestern Athletic Field; Evanston, IL | T 6–6 | | |
| October 24 | at Chicago | Marshall Field; Chicago, IL | W 46–6 | | |
| October 30 | Chicago Physicians and Surgeons* | Evanston, IL | W 16–6 | | |
| November 7 | at Illinois | Illinois Field; Champaign, IL (rivalry) | W 10–4 | | |
| November 14 | Chicago | Northwestern Athletic Field; Evanston, IL | L 6–18 | | |
| November 26 | Wisconsin | Northwestern Athletic Field; Evanston, IL | T 6–6 | 5,000 | |
*Non-conference game
