= William Ward (American football) =

American football player, coach, physician, and surgeon (1874–1936)

- Ward, c. 1896

Biographical details
- Born: August 25, 1874; Rochester, New York, U.S.
- Died: May 13, 1936 (aged 61); Rochester, New York, U.S.

Playing career
- 1893–1894: Princeton
- Positions: Halfback, quarterback

Coaching career (HC unless noted)
- 1895: Princeton (assistant)
- 1896: Michigan

Head coaching record
- Overall: 9–1

William Douglas Ward (August 25, 1874 – May 13, 1936) was an American college football player and coach, physician and surgeon. He played football at Princeton University from 1893 to 1894 and was the coach of the University of Michigan football team in 1896. He later became a physician and surgeon in Rochester, New York. He was a pioneer in early surgical procedures to construct artificial vaginas and published an article on the subject in 1915.

== Early years ==
Ward was born in Rochester, New York in August 1874. His grandfather, Levi Ward, was the mayor of Rochester. His father, Frank Addison Ward, was a Rochester native, a Princeton alumnus, and the chief executive of Ward's Natural Science Establishment, a company that supplied natural history specimens to colleges, museums and collectors in the United States and Europe. Ward's mother, Mary Hawley Douglas, was also a native of New York. He had seven younger siblings born between 1879 and 1894. Ward attended preparatory school at St. Paul's School in Concord, New Hampshire.

== Princeton ==
Ward enrolled at Princeton University, where he played football and baseball. He played at the left halfback position for the Princeton Tigers football team in 1893 and at quarterback in 1894. He scored the only touchdown in Princeton's 6–0 victory over Yale on Thanksgiving Day 1893. In December 1894, The New York Times wrote:

W. Douglas Ward, '95, quarter back, hails from Rochester, N. Y., and comes of an old family of Princeton athletes, his father having captained the baseball team of his day. Ward is considered the best all-round athlete in his class, and perhaps the best in college. He is also a fine scholar, standing at the head of his class. .... At his new position he is a master. He generals the team to the king's taste, and plays his position like a veteran. His presence at quarter braces up the entire team, and everybody has the utmost confidence in his ability to play the right play at the right time. Ward is twenty years of age, 5 feet, 9 inches in height, and weights 162 pounds.

Ward received a bachelor of arts degree from Princeton in 1895, and was one of only seven students in Princeton's Class of 1895 to graduate magna cum laude. He was voted the "Best All-Round Man in the Class, the "Best All-Round Athlete," the "Most Awkward Man," and the "Latin Salutatorian."

== Lawrenceville ==
After graduating from Princeton, Ward spent a year as a teacher in Lawrenceville, New Jersey. He also returned to Princeton during the fall of 1895 as an assistant coach for the Princeton football team. While at Lawrenceville, he sought "to impart into growing youth the mathematical idea, also the rudiments of foot-ball, and the truth of truths that there is no University in the country like Princeton." He later wrote, "Teaching, somehow, did not satisfy me: in fact, even before I left college I had an idea that I might be a doctor some day." In another piece, he noted that he "tried for a year to instill Princeton ideas, along with a little knowledge into the heads of the younger generation. The work was pleasant and I was associated with some fine men; but medicine is to be my vocation."

== University of Michigan ==
Ward attended the medical school at the University of Michigan from 1896 to 1897. He also served as the head football coach for the 1896 Michigan Wolverines football team. He was assisted in coaching the team by William McCauley (during the month of October), Keene Fitzpatrick and James Robinson. He led the team to a 9–1 record, outscoring opponents 262 to 11. The team went undefeated and allowed only four points in its first nine games, including victories over Michigan Normal (18–0), Grand Rapids High School (44–0), Physicians & Surgeons of Chicago (28–0), Rush Lake Forest (66–0), Purdue (16–0), Lehigh (40–0), Minnesota (6–4), Oberlin (10–0), and Wittenberg (28–0). The final game of the season was a 7–6 loss to the University of Chicago at Chicago Coliseum, in front of 8,000 fans. Ward later summarized his year at Michigan:

I began studying out at the University of Michigan, where I had an opportunity, also, to try foot-ball coaching, following in the footsteps of 'Jerry' McCauley, '94. With the foot-ball team I traveled a great deal of that middle western country, Minneapolis being the most western point I reached, and I often met old rivals from Yale or Harvard, and occasionally another Princeton man. ... There are many interesting things in coaching, but there are also some drawbacks and disagreeable features, so that I was glad to be through with it, and able to give myself wholly to the study of medicine.

He added that the medical program at Michigan was very good, and their laboratories "especially fine." While at Michigan, he was elected into the fraternity of Psi Upsilon. With respect to fraternity life, Ward wrote: "The boys were very good to me there and among other things elected me a member of the Psi Upsilon fraternity. There was a nice set of boys in the chapter and I used to have my room at the chapter house. It made life at Ann Arbor much more pleasant than it would have been, and I enjoyed the fraternity life, though I still rejoice that we don't indulge at Princeton." In another article, Ward wrote, "One year in the West was enough for me."

== Penn ==
In 1897, Ward enrolled in the medical school at the University of Pennsylvania. Ward received his M.D. from Penn in 1899. While at Penn, he was a member of Psi Upsilon and the H.C. Wood Medical Society. As he had done at Michigan, Ward followed in the footsteps of William "Jerry" McCauley. Both were Princeton football players who coached football at Michigan and received their medical degrees at Penn. Ward later wrote, "At Pennsylvania, too, 'Jerry' McCauley had been my forerunner, and he it was who took me around to see Dr. Joe upon the very day of my arrival in Philadelphia, and from that time until I left Philadelphia, in March, 1902, after a winter's special training with him, he was my friend and instructor; and if I ever make a name for myself in the domain of surgery it is his training that I have to thank for it. Many a morning would find me standing beside his operating table instead of on the benches of the lecture room where I belonged, but I have never repented my choice."

== Medical career ==
In 1902, Ward established a general medical practice at Rochester, New York. In 1905, he wrote an article on "A Doctor's Life" in which he noted:

The doctor in his works comes into such close contact with the serious side of life that it is hard to forget it and get away from it even for a time. It is necessary for him to have some other means of recreation that will direct his thoughts to other things, and he must have the power of thought concentration that will enable him to forget a while the worries of life. But you can't be a conscientious doctor and avoid all worries, so, if you are looking only for pleasures in this life, don't select the profession of medicine.

He became prominent as a physician and surgeon in Rochester. He was a surgeon at Rochester General Hospital and a member of the Rochester Medical Association and the Rochester Athletic Club. In 1905, he published an article titled, "The Possibility of Clean Obstetrical Work in the Slums," in "American Medicine." In 1910, Ward presented a paper to the Medical Society of the State of New York titled, "General Peritonitis – Shall We Ask Nature to do Her Own Surgery?" In 1915, he published an article titled "The Construction of an Artificial Vagina With Establishment of the Menstrual Function" in the journal, Surgery, Gynecology and Obstetrics. He wrote the article after studying attempts by doctors in Germany and the United States to construct artificial vaginas and after successfully performing the surgery on a 13-year-old girl at Rochester General Hospital. Ward became an advocate of the procedure and wrote:

It is not my intention in this short paper to go into a discussion of the propriety of making a patient go through the dangers of a major operation in order to make a vagina for her if she has not a functioning uterus. There is no question but that she can go through life quite comfortably, so far as physical comfort is concerned, without genital organs; but when the psychic aspect is considered it is quite a different proposition, and much can be said on both sides. My own views on the subject are simple. I believe that the sexual life is very important for the happiness of a very large proportion of mankind, and if a girl finds that part of life is impossible for her she is likely to brood over the loss and imagine it even greater than it is; so if she, fully understanding the danger of the operation, still wishes to have it performed, I am perfectly willing to try to remedy the defect in her anatomy.

Ward served overseas in World War I, and later served as a surgeon at the Park Avenue Clinical Hospital and was a member of the Medical Advisory Board and the New York State Selective Draft Service.

== Family and later years ==
On May 10, 1905, Ward was married to Anne Marie Devine. At the time of the 1910 United States census, Ward was living with his wife in Rochester, New York. They had twin sons born April 30, 1906, though one of the sons died in infancy. The surviving son was Francis Bernard Ward. They subsequently had another son, William Douglas Ward, Jr.

In a draft registration card completed in September 1918, Ward stated that he was living at 20 Grove Place in Rochester, New York, and was employed as a physician and surgeon. At the time of the 1920 United States census, Ward and his wife continued to reside at 20 Grove Place in Rochester with their two sons.

Ward died in 1936 at Park Avenue Hospital in Rochester.

== Head coaching record ==
Year	Team	Overall	Conference	Standing	Bowl/playoffs
Michigan Wolverines (Western Conference) (1896)
1896	Michigan	9–1	2–1	2nd	
Michigan:		9–1	2–1		
Total:		9–1			
