= Hudson R. Sours =

American lawyer and politician

Hudson Ralph Sours (October 29, 1909–May 27, 1976) was an American lawyer and politician.

Sours was born in Peoria, Illinois. He went to the Peoria public schools. Sours received his bachelor's degree from Wabash College and his law degree from Yale Law School. He practiced law in Peoria beginning in 1935. Sours served in the United States Army Air Forces during World War II and was commissioned a major. Sours served in the Illinois Senate from 1961 to 1975 and was a Republican. In the 1974 Republican primary, Prescott E. Bloom defeated Senator Sours. Sours died from a heart attack in Peoria, Illinois.
