= Prescott E. Bloom =

American lawyer and politician (1942-1986)

Prescott Eller Bloom (June 18, 1942 – January 11, 1986) was an American lawyer and politician.

Born in Peoria, Illinois, Bloom received his bachelor's degree from Williams College. He went to the London School of Economics and then received his law degree from the University of Illinois College of Law. He practiced law in Peoria and served in the United States Army Reserves. Bloom was a Republican. In the 1974 Republican primary, Bloom defeated incumbent Senator Hudson R. Sours. Bloom served in the Illinois Senate from 1975 until death in 1986. Bloom and his daughter died in a fire at their home in Peoria, Illinois. David R. Leitch was appointed by Republican leaders to succeed Bloom in the Senate. In an all write-in primary Carl Hawkinson defeated Leitch and won the general election.
