= John Wombacher =

American football player (1876–1953)

- Born: June 24, 1876; Illinois
- Died: April 1, 1953 (aged 76); Peoria, Illinois
- Citizenship: United States
- Education: University of Michigan
- Known for: Football player

John David Wombacher (June 24, 1876 – April 1, 1953) was an American football player.

Wombacher grew up in Peoria, Illinois. His father, Ferdinand Wombacher (1851–1931), was an Illinois native and a dairyman. His mother, Louisa (Wurst) Wombacher (1850–1937), was also an Illinois native. Both of his parents were the children of German immigrants. Wombacher had an older brother, Joseph, and a younger brother, Ferdinand Jr. Wombacher played for the undefeated Peoria High School football team of 1893.

He enrolled at the University of Michigan and played at the center position for the 1895 and 1896 Michigan Wolverines football teams. In February 1897, he was elected by his teammates as the captain of the 1897 team. However, he contracted typhoid fever and was unable to report to the university in September 1897. Wombacher had played every game at center for Michigan in 1896. Shortly before his illness, The World of New York had published a football preview feature in which Wombacher had been touted as the key to Michigan's success:

"The man who will captain the Unlversity of Michigan eleven is a big, strapping fellow, who was forced into the game by his classmates because of his size and ability to get over the ground. His name is John B. Wombacher, and he hails from Peoria, Ill. He plays centre rush and is something terrific."

Wombacher was unable to play in 1897, remaining at his parents' home in Peoria to recuperate from the illness. Halfback, James R. Hogg, was elected to replace Wombacher as the 1897 team captain.

At the time of the 1900 United States census, Wombacher was living in Peoria and working as a chemist.

He worked for many years for the Steel Mills Co. in Joliet, Illinois. In September 1918, Wombacher completed a draft registration card in which he indicated that he was living at West Marion, Illinois and employed as an assistant superintendent at the Illinois Steel Co. At the time of the 1920 Census, Wombacher was living in Joliet with his wife, Louise, and was working as an assistant superintendent at a steel mill.

In April 1953, Wombacher died in Peoria at age 76.
