= Julia H. Johnston =

American hymnwriter (1849–1919)

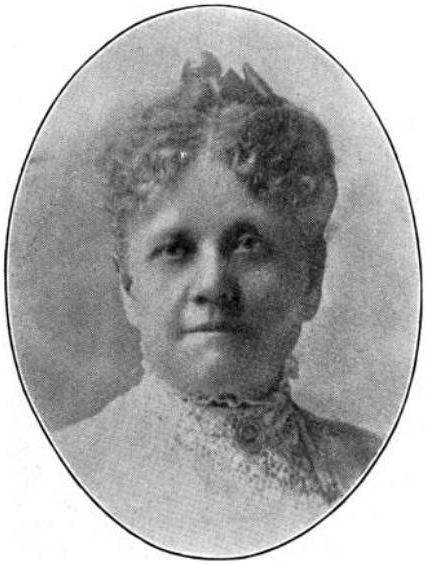
- Born: January 21, 1849; Salineville, Ohio
- Died: March 6, 1919 (aged 70); Peoria, Illinois
- Occupations: Teacher, writer, musician

Signature
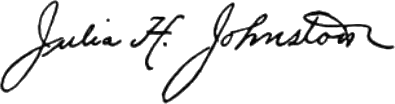

Julia Harriette Johnston (1849–1919) was a Presbyterian teacher, author, and musician who wrote the lyrics to the song "Grace Greater Than All Our Sin".

== Biography ==
Johnston was born on January 21, 1849, in Salineville, Ohio, United States, but lived in Gettysburg, Pennsylvania most of the first six years of her life, while her father pastored a church there. At the age of six she moved with her family to Peoria, Illinois where her father was pastor of the First Presbyterian Church in Peoria. Her mother and grandmother were poets, and Julia Johnston originally wrote verse under the pen name, "Juniata." In addition to authoring over 500 hymns, Johnston worked as a Sunday school superintendent and teacher for over forty years and served as president of the Presbyterian Missionary Society. Johnston wrote the lyrics to "Grace Greater Than All Our Sin" and Daniel B. Towner (1850 – 1919) wrote the music. In 1911, the song was published in Hymns Tried and True. The song describes the Christian idea of grace and justification by faith articulated in Paul's Letter to the Romans in Verses 5:1-2 and 14-16.

She died in Peoria, Illinois on March 6, 1919, and was buried there.

== Books authored ==
- School of the Master (1880)
- Bright Threads (1897)
- Indian and Spanish Neighbors (1905)
- Fifty Missionary Heroes (1913)
