= Samuel M. Hammond =

American football coach and physician

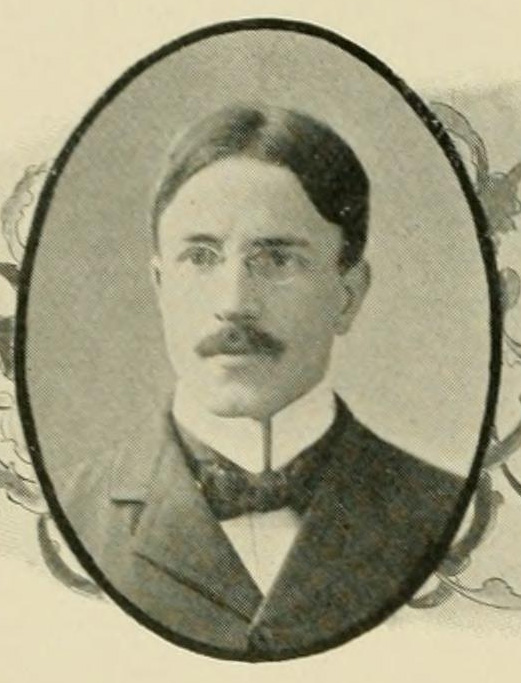
- Hammond pictured in The Epitome 1899, Lehigh yearbook

Biographical details
- Born: October 24, 1870; New Canaan, Connecticut, U.S.
- Died: November 20, 1934 (aged 64); St. Petersburg, Florida, U.S.

Coaching career (HC unless noted)
- 1896: Purdue
- 1897: Lehigh

Head coaching record
- Overall: 7–9–1

Samuel Mowbray Hammond (October 24, 1870 – November 20, 1934) was an American college football coach and physician. He served as the head football coach at Purdue University for one season in 1896 and at Lehigh University for one season in 1897, compiling a career record of 7–9–1.

== Coaching career ==
=== Purdue ===
Hammond's first coaching position was for the Purdue Boilermakers in West Lafayette, Indiana. Highlights of his one season as coach include victories over the Notre Dame Fighting Irish and the DePauw Tigers.

=== Lehigh ===
Hammond was named the sixth head football coach at Lehigh University in Bethlehem, Pennsylvania and he held that position for the 1897 season. His coaching record at Lehigh was 3–7.

== Medical career and death ==
Hammond graduated from the Yale School of Medicine in 1893. While coaching football at Purdue, he was also a member of the physics faculty. Hammond practiced medicine as an ear and eye specialist in Hartford and New Haven, Connecticut for nearly four decades. He died at his winter home in St. Petersburg, Florida on November 20, 1934.

== Head coaching record ==
Year	Team	Overall	Conference	Standing	Bowl/playoffs
Purdue Boilermakers (Western Conference) (1896)
1896	Purdue	4–2–1	0–2–1	T–6th	
Purdue:		4–2–1	0–2–1		
Lehigh (Independent) (1897)
1897	Lehigh	3–7			
Lehigh:		3–7			
Total:		7–9–1			
