= Ignatius M. Duffy =

American college football player and coach (1875–1958)

Biographical details
- Born: January 27, 1875; Ann Arbor, Michigan, U.S.
- Died: October 6, 1958 (aged 83); Detroit, Michigan, U.S.

Playing career
- 1896: Michigan
- Position: Fullback

Coaching career (HC unless noted)
- 1895: Alma
- 1897: Michigan (assistant)
- 1897: Hillsdale

Head coaching record
- Overall: 4–2–1

Ignatius Michael "Nate" Duffy (January 27, 1875 – October 6, 1958) was an American college football player and coach. He served as the head football coach at Alma College in 1895 and Hillsdale College in 1897. Duffy played football for one season at the University of Michigan, in 1896, and was an assistant coach there the following year while also coaching at Hillsdale.

== Biography ==
A native of Ann Arbor, Michigan, Duffy attended Ann Arbor High School. He attended college at the University of Michigan. In 1895, while a student at Michigan, Duffy served as the head football coach for Alma College in Alma, Michigan. His coaching record at Alma was 3–1. He played on Michigan Wolverines football team as a fullback in 1896. Duffy was a member of the Alpha Epsilon fraternity. He spent only "a short time in college". In 1897, he served as an assistant coach for the Michigan football team. That fall, he also coached football at Hillsdale College in Hillsdale, Michigan.

In 1902, Duffy was working as an electrician. His brothers James E. Duffy and John Duffy also played football for Michigan. Duffy died on October 6, 1958.

== Head coaching record ==
Year	Team	Overall	Conference	Standing	Bowl/playoffs
Alma Maroon and Cream (Independent) (1895)
1895	Alma	3–1			
Alma:		3–1			
Hillsdale Dales (Michigan Intercollegiate Athletic Association) (1897)
1897	Hillsdale	1–1–1	0–1–1		
Hillsdale:		1–1–1	0–1–1		
Total:		4–2–1			
