= Angie Ostaszewski =

American tiktoker

- Born: 1990 or 1991 (age 34–35)

Angie Ostaszewski is an American TikToker who promotes relocating to Peoria, Illinois.

Ostaszewski grew up in the Bloomington-Normal area.

Ostaszewski is an energy efficiency consultant for Ameren Illinois. She moved to Peoria from Chicago around 2013. She was surprised when in 2017 at the age of 27 she was able to purchase a home for $33,000 and began encouraging family members to relocate.

In 2020 she started a TikTok to encourage others to consider moving to Peoria and according to The New York Times approximately 300 people had relocated after seeing her posts. A typical post highlights an individual home on the market or provides information about inclusive local events. The Times wrote, "What’s novel about Ms. Ostaszewski’s posts is not that she’s highlighting a midsize, Midwestern city as an affordable place to live, but also as a place where a diverse, inclusive community can be formed."

Local reaction has been mixed. Some business owners note a marked increase in sales. Some residents express concern about the influx of diverse community members changing the local culture; others have expressed concerns about gentrification. Some note the positive effect in the form of demand for housing in a city which has experienced loss of residents.
