= Carl Hawkinson =

American politician (born 1947)

Member of the Illinois Senate from the 47th district
- In office January 1987 – January 2003
- Preceded by: David Leitch
- Succeeded by: John M. Sullivan

Member of the Illinois House of Representatives from the 94th district
- In office January 1983 – January 1987
- Preceded by: District created
- Succeeded by: David Hultgren

Personal details
- Born: October 7, 1947 (age 78) Galesburg, Illinois, U.S.
- Party: Republican
- Education: North Park University; Harvard Law School
- Profession: Attorney; Politician

Carl E. Hawkinson (born October 7, 1947) is an American attorney and a former Republican member of the Illinois General Assembly, serving in the Illinois House of Representatives from 1983 to 1987 and the Illinois Senate from 1987 to 2003.

== Early life and career ==
Born in Galesburg, Illinois, Hawkinson received his bachelor's degree from North Park University and his Juris Doctor degree from Harvard Law School. He was elected Knox County State's Attorney in 1976, succeeding fellow Republican Donald C. Woolsey.

== Illinois General Assembly ==
In 1982, after the Cutback Amendment mandated the creation of single-member districts, Hawkinson ran for the 94th district. The 94th district included Warren County and portions of Knox and Peoria counties. Hawkinson defeated incumbent Democratic legislator Samuel M. McGrew.

On January 31, 1986, David R. Leitch was appointed to the Illinois Senate to succeed the late Prescott E. Bloom. As Bloom was the only candidate to file for the 1986 Republican primary, Leitch and Hawkinson both ran in the primary as write-in candidates. Hawkinson defeated Leitch in the Republican primary by a large margin. In the general election, Hawkinson faced Democratic candidate and former state legislator John Cassidy of Peoria. Despite the hope of Democrats to capitalize on cross pressure of party affiliation and a hometown state senator to win the Peoria seat, Hawkinson won the general election. Hawkinson served as Illinois State Senator representing the 47th District from 1987 to 2003. In the Illinois House, Hawkinson was succeeded by fellow Republican David Hultgren after Hultgren defeated Democratic candidate Samuel M. McGrew's comeback bid.

In the 1991 Republican-controlled decennial redistricting, the 47th district was redrawn to include all or parts of Bureau, Henry, Knox, Peoria, Stark, and Warren counties.

In the 2001 decennial redistricting Haskinson's district was divided into the 37th and 47th. In the 37th, Republican Dale Risinger defeated Paul Mangieri, the State's Attorney for Knox County while in the "new" 47th Democratic candidate John M. Sullivan defeated Republican incumbent Laura Kent Donahue.

== Runs for higher office ==
In 2000 he made an unsuccessful run for the Illinois State Supreme Court, winning the Republican party primary but losing in the general election to Thomas Kilbride. In 2002 Carl Hawkinson ran for Lieutenant Governor of Illinois as the running mate of Illinois Attorney General Jim Ryan. Both men won in the Republican primary where Hawkinson received 47% of the vote defeating State Representative William O'Connor, Jack McInerney, and Charles Owens, but lost to Rod Blagojevich and Pat Quinn in the general election. Carl Hawkinson served as Deputy Chief of Staff for Public Safety for the State of Illinois from 2003 to 2005. While holding this position he was the top Republican in the Blagojevich administration.

== Electoral history ==
- 2002 Race for Governor / Lieutenant Governor
  - Rod Blagojevich / Pat Quinn (D), 52%
  - Jim Ryan / Carl Hawkinson (R), 45%
- 2000 Race for Illinois Supreme Court; 3rd District
  - Tom Kilbride (D), 52%
  - Carl Hawkinson (R), 48%

Party political offices
Preceded by Corinne Wood	Republican nominee for Lieutenant Governor of Illinois; 2002	Succeeded by Joe Birkett
