= Robert L. Burhans =

American politician

Robert L. Burhans (September 19, 1916 – January 16, 2002) was an American lawyer and politician.

Burhans was born in Peoria, Illinois. He received his bachelor's and law degrees from University of Michigan in 1936 and 1939. Burhans was admitted to the Illinois bar in 1939 and practiced law in Peoria. Burhans served in the United States Navy during World War II. Burhans served in the Illinois House of Representatives from 1949 to 1965 and was a Republican. He died at Apostolic Christian Skyways in Peoria, Illinois.
