= Eckley, California =

Eckley
- Former settlement
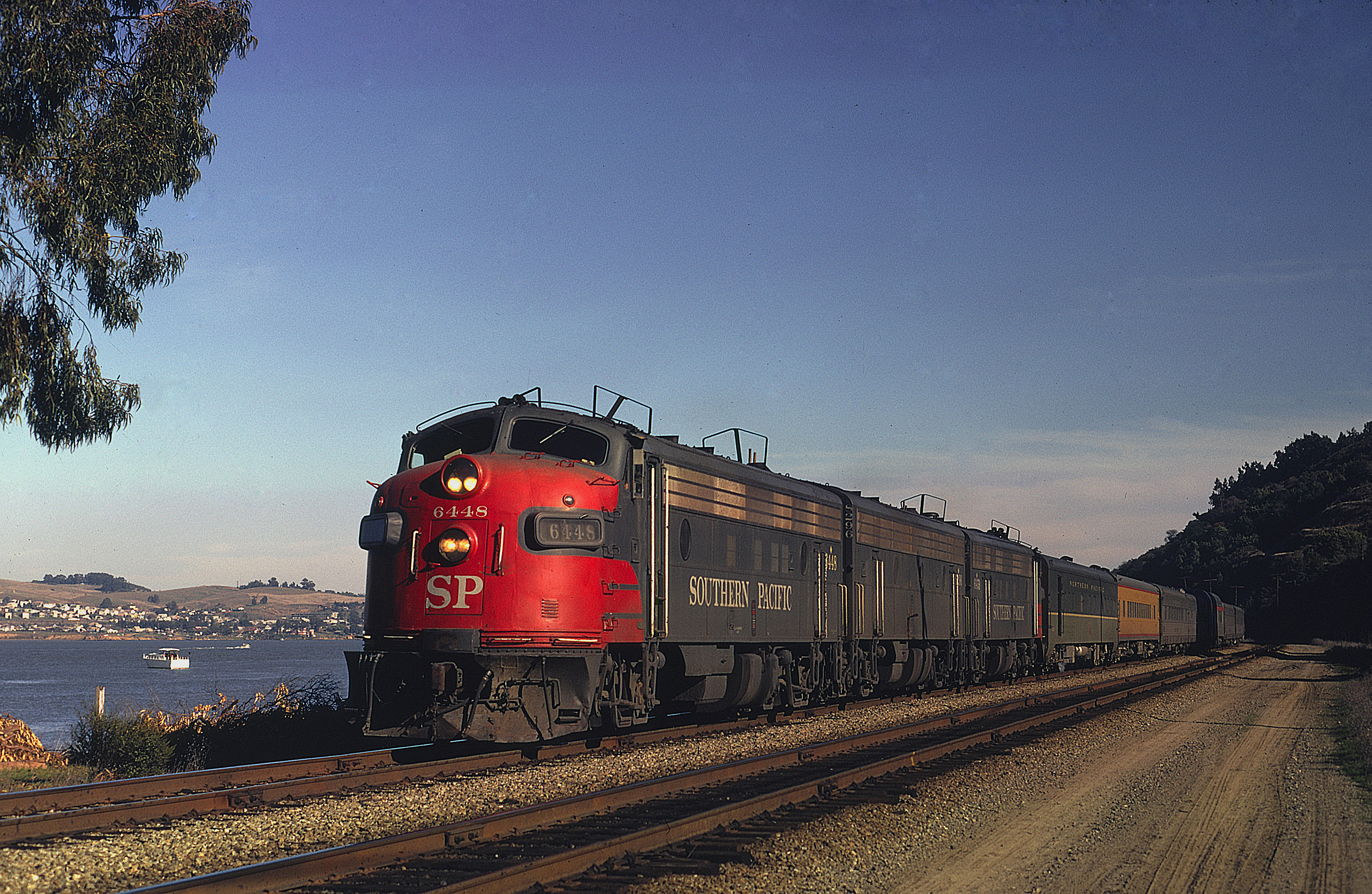
- The City of San Francisco at Eckley in 1971

- Location in California
- Coordinates: 38°03′14″N 122°12′10″W
- Country: United States
- State: California
- County: Contra Costa
- Elevation: 9.8 ft (3 m)

Eckley is an area in Contra Costa County, California, United States. The place's name is in honor of Commodore John L. Eckley, who established a yacht harbor at the cove here. Eckley became a popular resort. An old ferry was used as the clubhouse.

It lay on the Southern Pacific Railroad, 4.5 miles (7.2 km) northwest of Martinez, at an elevation of 10 feet (3 m).
