= Grace Greater Than All Our Sin =

- by Julia H. Johnston
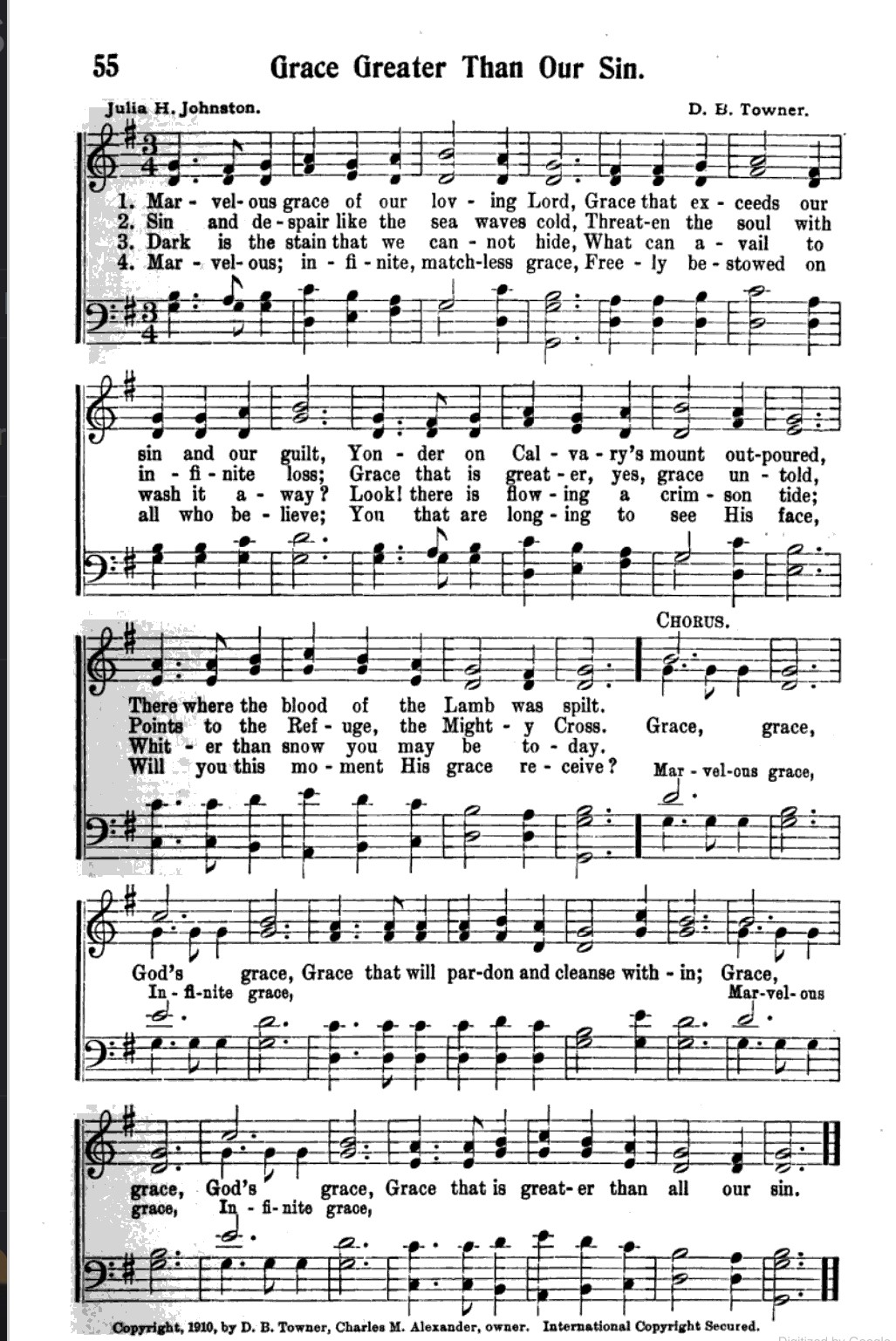
- music and lyrics published in 1921
- Genre: Hymn
- Written: 1911
- Based on: Romans 5
- Meter: 9.9.9.9 with refrain
- Melody: "Moody" by Daniel B. Towner

Grace Greater Than All Our Sin is a well-known Christian hymn with lyrics by Julia H. Johnston and music by Daniel B. Towner.

Julia H. Johnston (1849-1919), a Presbyterian teacher, author, and musician from Illinois, wrote the lyrics. Daniel B. Towner (1850-1919) wrote the music, naming the tune "Moody" because he worked as director of music at Moody Bible Institute. In 1911, the song was published in Hymns Tried and True. The song describes the Christian doctrine of grace and justification by faith articulated in Paul's Letter to the Romans in Romans 5:1-2 and 14-16. The last line of the refrain, "Grace that is greater than all our sin!", and also the second line of the first verse, "Grace that exceeds our sin and our guilt!", both reflect Romans 5:20b: "But where sin abounded, grace did much more abound".

This hymn is in the public domain.

== Lyrics ==
Grace Greater Than All Our Sin

1 Marvelous grace of our loving Lord,
Grace that exceeds our sin and our guilt!
Yonder on Calvary's mount out-poured –
There where the blood of the Lamb was spilt. [Refrain]

2 Sin and despair, like the sea-waves cold,
Threaten the soul with infinite loss;
Grace that is greater– yes, grace untold –
Points to the Refuge, the mighty Cross. [Refrain]

3 Dark is the stain that we cannot hide,
What can avail to wash it away?
Look! There is flowing a crimson tide;
Whiter than snow you may be today. [Refrain]

4 Marvelous, infinite, matchless grace,
Freely bestowed on all who believe!
You who are longing to see His face,
Will you this moment His grace receive? [Refrain]

Refrain:
Grace, grace, God's grace,
Grace that will pardon and cleanse within;
Grace, grace, God's grace,
Grace that is greater than all our sin!
