= Marty Wombacher =

American writer and photojournalist

Marty Wombacher (born 1957 or 1958) is an American writer and photojournalist, born in Peoria, Illinois, who lived in New York City from 1993 to 2012. In 2012 he moved back to his hometown of Peoria and began a blog about living in the Midwest.

Wombacher's first publishing success was Trivial Trivia, The Idiot Edition, which he created with Greg Owens. The 1985 game was a satire of Trivial Pursuit and it became a success after DJ Gene Konrad featured the game on his local morning show on WIRL in Peoria. The U.P.I. wire service picked the story up and it was featured in newspapers, radio shows and TV news across the country. The peak of the success came when Wombacher and Owens appeared on The Today Show in New York City and were interviewed by Jane Pauley in 1986.

From 1989 to 1993 he was the editor, publisher and one of the primary writers for People of Peoria (later shortened to POP) magazine. The magazine was published and distributed out of Peoria, Illinois. The quarterly publication was popular with positive write-ups appearing in the Peoria Journal Star, Chicago Tribune and Spin magazine.

From 1990 to 1993 Wombacher did freelance feature writing for the daily newspaper, The Pekin Daily Times.

In 1993, Wombacher moved to New York City and has written for the New York Post, New York Daily News, New York Newsday, Time Out New York, Gadfly magazine, Nerve magazine and New York Press among others.

From 1993 to 2000 he was the editor, publisher and primary writer for fishwrap magazine, a satirical magazine whose focus was mainstream media, in particular magazines. The magazine was based out of New York City and was given favorable write-ups and reviews in: USA Today, Men's Journal, the Peoria Journal Star, New York Post, New York Daily News, the Chicago Tribune and the New York Press. It had national distribution from Big Top Publishing out of San Francisco.

In 2002, Wombacher wrote the book 99 Beers Off The Wall. He wrote another book, The Boy Who Would Be A Fire Truck, in 2008.

Wombacher finished his website, A Guy Walks Into 365 Bars, on January 10, 2011.

He retired his Marty After Dark blog in 2012.

He retired his Tripping With Marty. blog in December 2012 and moved back to his hometown of Peoria, Illinois.

He's currently blogging at Meanwhile, Back In Peoria...
