= Sherman W. Eckley =

American businessman and politician

Sherman W. Eckley (February 27, 1866 – May 4, 1928) was an American businessman and politician.

Born in Peoria, Illinois, Eckley was in the jewelry business and served as the commissioner of public workers for the city of Peoria. He served in the Illinois House of Representatives from 1927 until his death. He was a Republican. Eckley died in Peoria after a short illness.
