= Fred J. Tuerk =

American journalist and politician (1922-2001)

Fred J. Tuerk (July 19, 1922 – August 16, 2001) was an American journalist and politician.

Tuerk was born in Peoria, Illinois. He served in the United States Navy during World War II. Turek received his degree in journalism from University of Missouri. He then worked as a sports reporter for the Journal Star newspaper in Peoria. He also worked in public relations for Caterpillar Inc. Tuerk served in the Illinois House of Representatives from 1969 until 1989 and was a Republican. He also served on the Peoria Park Board. Tuerk died at St. Vincent Hospital in Peoria from emphysema and heart failure.
