= List of Iowa Hawkeyes football honorees =

The Iowa Hawkeyes football team was founded in 1889 to represent the University of Iowa in intercollegiate competition, and it has participated in the sport every season since. Over the course of the team's history, individual Hawkeye players of exceptional ability have received many accolades.

Iowa has had several players inducted into the Pro Football Hall of Fame, College Football Hall of Fame, Canadian Football Hall of Fame, and Iowa Sports Hall of Fame. Individual Hawkeyes have won many prestigious national awards, including the Outland Trophy, the Davey O'Brien Award, the Doak Walker Award, the Jim Thorpe Award, and the Heisman Trophy. 113 Hawkeyes have been named a first-team or second-team All-American, and 35 have been named consensus first-team All-Americans.

The Iowa Hawkeyes have had ten players win the Big Ten Most Valuable Player Award, and 219 Hawks have earned All-Big Ten recognition. Iowa has had 244 NFL draft picks, and several former Hawkeye players have gone on to become NFL head coaches or Division I college head coaches.

== Individual award winners ==
- Heisman Trophy
  Nile Kinnick – 1939
- Maxwell Award
  Nile Kinnick – 1939
  Chuck Long – 1985
- AP Athlete of the Year
  Nile Kinnick – 1939
- AP Player of the Year
  Brad Banks – 2002
- Davey O'Brien Award
  Chuck Long – 1985
  Brad Banks – 2002
- UPI Lineman of the Year
  Alex Karras – 1957
- Mosi Tatupu Award
  Kahlil Hill – 2001
- John Mackey Award
  Dallas Clark – 2002
  T. J. Hockenson – 2018
- Ozzie Newsome Award
  T. J. Hockenson – 2018
- Jack Tatum Trophy
  Desmond King – 2015
  Josh Jackson – 2017
- Jack Lambert Trophy
  Josey Jewell – 2017
- Lott IMPACT Trophy
  Josey Jewell – 2017
- Lou Groza Award
  Nate Kaeding – 2002
- Doak Walker Award
  Shonn Greene – 2008
- Jim Brown Award
  Shonn Greene – 2008
- Jim Thorpe Award
  Desmond King – 2015
- Outland Trophy
  Cal Jones – 1955
  Alex Karras – 1957
  Robert Gallery – 2003
  Brandon Scherff – 2014
- Rimington Trophy
  Tyler Linderbaum – 2021
- Butkus Award
  Jack Campbell - 2022
- Ray Guy Award
  Tory Taylor - 2023
- Jet Award
  Kaden Wetjen - 2024

== Coaching award winners ==
- AFCA Coach of the Year
  Eddie Anderson – 1939
- AP Coach of the Year Award
  Kirk Ferentz – 2002
- Walter Camp Coach of the Year Award
  Kirk Ferentz – 2002
- Bobby Dodd Coach of the Year Award
  Kirk Ferentz – 2015
- Eddie Robinson Coach of the Year Award
  Kirk Ferentz – 2015
- Woody Hayes Trophy
  Kirk Ferentz – 2015
- Amos Alonzo Stagg Award
  Hayden Fry – 2005
- Sporting News College Football Coach of the Year
  Hayden Fry – 1981

== Team Awards ==
- Joe Moore Award
  Iowa – 2016
- Disney's Wide World of Sports Spirit Award
  Iowa – 2017
- Laureus World Sports Award for Best Sporting Moment
  Iowa – 2017

== Heisman Trophy nominees ==
The most prestigious of these individual awards is the Heisman Trophy. Nile Kinnick won the award in 1939, and four other Hawkeyes have placed second in the voting. In all, nine Hawkeye players have finished in the top ten in the Heisman Trophy balloting, with Chuck Long doing so twice:

Season	Player	Heisman Finish
1939	Nile Kinnick	First
1955	Cal Jones	Tenth
1956	Ken Ploen	Ninth
1957	Alex Karras	Second
1958	Randy Duncan	Second
1984	Chuck Long	Seventh
1985	Chuck Long	Second
1997	Tim Dwight	Seventh
2002	Brad Banks	Second
2008	Shonn Greene	Sixth

== Hall of Fame inductees ==
=== College Football Hall of Fame ===
Nile Kinnick, Duke Slater, and coach Howard Jones were all inducted in the inaugural College Football Hall of Fame class in 1951. In all, eleven players and six coaches now represent Iowa in the College Football Hall of Fame:

College Football Hall of Fame
Name	Position	Tenure	Year Inducted
Howard Jones	Coach	1916–23	1951
Duke Slater	T	1918–21	1951
Nile Kinnick	QB	1936–39	1951
Gordon Locke	FB	1920–22	1960
Eddie Anderson	Coach	1939–49	1971
Aubrey Devine	QB	1919–21	1973
Slip Madigan	Coach	1943–44	1974
Cal Jones	G	1952–55	1980
Alex Karras	DT	1954–57	1981
Randy Duncan	QB	1956–58	1997
Chuck Long	QB	1981–85	1999
Forest Evashevski	Coach	1952–60	2000
Hayden Fry	Coach	1979–98	2003
Larry Station	LB	1982–85	2009
Andre Tippett	DE	1979–82	2021
Bob Stoops	Coach	1983-87	2021
Robert Gallery	T	2000-03	2023

=== Pro Football Hall of Fame ===
Five Hawkeyes have been inducted into the Pro Football Hall of Fame:

Pro Football Hall of Fame
Name	Position	Teams	Year Inducted
Emlen Tunnell	DB	New York Giants, Green Bay Packers	1967
Paul Krause	S	Minnesota Vikings, Washington Redskins	1998
Andre Tippett	LB	New England Patriots	2008
Duke Slater	OT	Milwaukee Badgers, Rock Island Independents, Chicago Cardinals	2020
Alex Karras	DT	Detroit Lions	2020

=== Canadian Football Hall of Fame ===
Three Hawkeyes have been inducted into the Canadian Football Hall of Fame for their play in the Canadian Football League:

Canadian Football Hall of Fame
Name	Position	Teams	Year Inducted
Ken Ploen	QB	Winnipeg Blue Bombers	1975
Willie Fleming	RB	BC Lions	1982
Frank Rigney	OT	Winnipeg Blue Bombers	1985

=== Iowa Sports Hall of Fame ===
The Iowa Sports Hall of Fame, sponsored by the Des Moines Register, honors outstanding athletes and sports contributors. To be eligible, members must have either been born in Iowa or gained prominence while competing for a college or university in Iowa. Aubrey Devine, Nile Kinnick, and Duke Slater were three of the five football players inducted when the Hall was founded in 1951. 25 Hawkeye players and 3 Hawkeye coaches have been inducted into the Iowa Sports Hall of Fame:

Iowa Sports Hall of Fame
Name	Year Inducted	Name	Year Inducted
Aubrey Devine	1951	Mike Enich	1983
Duke Slater	1951	Paul Krause	1985
Nile Kinnick	1951	Ed Podolak	1986
Clyde Williams	1956	Wally Hilgenberg	1987
Gordon Locke	1958	Jack Dittmer	1988
Billy Edson	1959	Forest Evashevski	1989
Joe Laws	1961	Larry Station	2000
Eddie Anderson	1962	Chuck Long	2001
Stub Stewart	1965	Ken Ploen	2002
Cal Jones	1971	Reggie Roby	2003
Willis Glassgow	1973	Hayden Fry	2004
Emlen Tunnell	1975	Andre Tippett	2006
Randy Duncan	1976	Tavian Banks	2013
Alex Karras	1977	Tim Dwight	2014

=== University of Iowa Athletics Hall of Fame ===
The University of Iowa started an Athletics Hall of Fame in 1989. Ten football players were inducted in the initial class, and it has since expanded to include 50 football players and coaches:

University of Iowa Athletics Hall of Fame
Name	Year Inducted	Name	Year Inducted
Aubrey Devine	1989	Stub Barron	1998
Willis Glassgow	1989	Emlen Tunnell	1998
Cal Jones	1989	Paul Krause	2000
Alex Karras	1989	Stub Stewart	2000
Nile Kinnick	1989	Bill Reichardt	2001
Gordon Locke	1989	Homer Harris	2002
Erwin Prasse	1989	Francis Schammel	2003
Ozzie Simmons	1989	Hayden Fry	2004
Duke Slater	1989	Mike Reilly	2005
Forest Evashevski	1989	Larry Station	2005
Mike Enich	1990	John Niland	2006
Ken Ploen	1990	Reggie Roby	2006
Lester Belding	1991	Andre Tippett	2007
Joe Laws	1991	Marv Cook	2008
Dick Crayne	1992	Fred Becker	2009
Randy Duncan	1992	Bob Jeter	2010
Frank Cuhel	1993	Tim Dwight	2011
Jack Dittmer	1993	Sherwyn Thorson	2011
Clyde Williams	1993	Bashir Yamini	2012
Howard Jones	1993	Brad Banks	2013
Jerry Hilgenberg	1995	Craig Clemons	2013
Emerson Nelson	1995	Nate Kaeding	2014
Al Couppee	1996	Don Norton	2015
Jim Gibbons	1996	Willie Brashier	2015
Chuck Long	1997	Dave Haight	2016

== Retired numbers ==
Iowa Hawkeyes retired numbers
No.	Player	Position	Tenure
24	Nile Kinnick	QB	1936–39
62	Cal Jones	OG	1952–55

Two numbers have been retired by the Hawkeye football program, Nile Kinnick's #24 and Cal Jones' #62. Both Kinnick and Jones were consensus first team All-Americans, and both men died in separate plane crashes before their 25th birthday.

Kinnick won the University of Iowa's only Heisman Trophy in 1939 and is the man for whom Kinnick Stadium is named. Jones was the first African-American to win the Outland Trophy and is the only Hawkeye to be named first-team All-American three times.

== All-American selections ==
Each year, numerous publications and organizations release lists of All-America teams, hypothetical rosters of players considered the best in the nation at their respective positions. The National Collegiate Athletic Association (NCAA) uses officially recognized All-America selectors to determine the consensus selections. Over time, the sources used to determine the consensus selections have varied. Currently, the NCAA uses five "major" selectors to determine consensus All-Americans: the Associated Press (AP), American Football Coaches Association (AFCA), Football Writers Association of America (FWAA), The Sporting News (TSN), and the Walter Camp Football Foundation (WCFF). Many other publications and organization compile their own "minor" All-America teams in addition to the selectors listed here.

Clyde Williams is often referred to as "Iowa's first All-American". Williams, who led the Hawkeyes to its first Big Ten championship in 1900, was named a third-team All-American by Walter Camp that season. Williams was the first player west of the Mississippi River to garner All-American honors. However, since the following list constitutes only first-team and second-team All-Americans, Williams is not included here.

Iowa has had 81 first-team All-Americans and 34 second-team All-Americans. Of Iowa's 81 first-team All-Americans, 37 were Consensus First-Team All-American selections (Cal Jones and Larry Station were named twice), while 17 were Unanimous First-Team selections. The Hawkeyes have had multiple consensus All-Americans eight times in program history (1981, 1985, 2002, 2003, 2017, 2023, 2024 and 2025). As of 2025, Iowa's 17 Unanimous All Americans is ranked 9th most in college football history.

Key
Consensus/Unanimous* first-team selection	First-team selection	Second-team selection

Season	Player	Remarks
1912	Jim Trickey	
1916	Fred Becker	
1919	Lester Belding	
1919	Duke Slater	
1920	Lester Belding	Second selection
1921	Aubrey Devine	
1921	Gordon Locke	
1921	Duke Slater	Second selection
1922	Max Kadesky	
1922	Gordon Locke	Second first-team selection
1924	John Hancock	
1925	Dick Romey	
1926	Emerson Nelson	
1928	Willis Glassgow	
1928	Peter Westra	
1929	Willis Glassgow	Second selection
1933	Joe Laws	
1933	Francis Schammel	
1934	Ozzie Simmons	
1935	Ozzie Simmons	Second selection
1939	Nile Kinnick	
1939	Erwin Prasse	
1940	Mike Enich	
1948	Bill Kay	
1951	Bill Reichardt	
1953	Jerry Hilgenberg	
1953	Cal Jones	
1954	Cal Jones	Second first-team selection
1955	Cal Jones	Second consensus selection; Third first-team selection
1956	Frank Gilliam	
1956	Alex Karras	
1956	Ken Ploen	
1956	Don Suchy	
1957	Jim Gibbons	
1957	Alex Karras	Second first-team selection
1958	Randy Duncan*	Unanimous selection
1958	Curt Merz	

Season	Player	Remarks
1959	Don Norton	
1960	Larry Ferguson	
1960	Wilburn Hollis	
1960	Mark Manders	
1961	Bill Van Buren	
1963	Mike Reilly	
1964	John Niland	
1964	Karl Noonan	
1965	Dave Long	
1965	John Niland	Second selection
1971	Craig Clemons	
1975	Joe Devlin	
1975	Rod Walters	
1979	Dennis Mosley	
1980	John Harty	
1981	Pat Dean	
1981	Reggie Roby	
1981	Andre Tippett	
1982	Mark Bortz	
1982	Reggie Roby	Second first-team selection
1983	Joel Hilgenberg	
1983	Larry Station	
1984	Ronnie Harmon	
1984	Jonathan Hayes	
1984	Larry Station	Second selection
1985	Ronnie Harmon	Second selection
1985	Chuck Long*	Unanimous selection
1985	Larry Station*	Unanimous selection; Second consensus selection; Third selection
1986	Dave Croston	
1987	Dave Haight	
1988	Marv Cook	
1988	Dave Haight	Second selection
1990	Nick Bell	
1990	Merton Hanks	
1991	Leroy Smith	
1992	Mike Devlin	

Season	Player	Remarks
1996	Tim Dwight	
1997	Tavian Banks	
1997	Jared DeVries	
1997	Tim Dwight	Second first-team selection
1998	Jared DeVries	Second selection
2002	Brad Banks	
2002	Dallas Clark*	Unanimous selection
2002	Nate Kaeding	
2002	Bruce Nelson	
2002	Eric Steinbach	
2003	Robert Gallery*	Unanimous selection
2003	Nate Kaeding	Second first-team selection
2003	Bob Sanders	
2004	Chad Greenway	
2004	Matt Roth	
2005	Chad Greenway	Second selection
2008	Shonn Greene*	Unanimous selection
2008	Mitch King	
2009	Pat Angerer	
2009	Bryan Bulaga	
2010	Adrian Clayborn	
2011	Riley Reiff	
2014	Brandon Scherff*	Unanimous selection
2015	Desmond King*	Unanimous selection
2016	Desmond King	Second selection
2017	Josey Jewell*	Unanimous selection
2017	Josh Jackson*	Unanimous selection
2018	T. J. Hockenson	
2019	Keith Duncan	
2019	Tristan Wirfs	
2019	A. J. Epenesa	
2020	Daviyon Nixon*	Unanimous selection
2021	Tyler Linderbaum*	Unanimous selection
2022	Jack Campbell*	Unanimous selection
2023	Cooper DeJean*	Unanimous selection
2023	Tory Taylor*	Unanimous selection
2023	Jay Higgins	
2024	Jay Higgins*	Unanimous selection
2024	Kaleb Johnson	
2024	Kaden Wetjen	
2024	Luke Elkin	
2025	Logan Jones*	Unanimous selection
2025	Kaden Wetjen	

*—Unanimous selection

== Big Ten honorees ==
=== Most Valuable Players ===
The Chicago Tribune Silver Football has been awarded since 1924 by the Chicago Tribune to the college football player determined to be the Most Valuable Player of the Big Ten Conference. Ten Hawkeyes have won the Big Ten MVP award, the third largest number of winners by any school, trailing only Michigan and Ohio State:

Inducted	Player
1929	Willis Glassgow
1933	Joe Laws
1939	Nile Kinnick
1951	Bill Reichardt
1956	Ken Ploen

Inducted	Player
1958	Randy Duncan
1985	Chuck Long
1990	Nick Bell
2002	Brad Banks
2008	Shonn Greene

=== Annual individual honors ===
Coaches and media of the Big Ten also make annual selections for additional individual honors:

Big Ten Conference Award	Recipient(s) and year received
Offensive Player of the Year	Chuck Long (1985); Nick Bell & Matt Rodgers (1990); Tavian Banks (1997); Brad Banks (2002); Shonn Greene (2008)
Defensive Player of the Year	Leroy Smith (1991); Josey Jewell (2017); Daviyon Nixon (2020); Jack Campbell (2022)
Offensive Lineman of the Year	Mike Haight (1985); Dave Croston (1986); Mike Devlin (1992); Eric Steinbach (2002); Robert Gallery (2003); Bryan Bulaga (2009); Brandon Scherff (2014); Tristan Wirfs (2019); Tyler Linderbaum (2021)
Receiver of the Year	Marvin McNutt (2011)
Tight End of the Year	T. J. Hockenson (2018); Sam LaPorta (2022)
Defensive Lineman of the Year	Paul Hufford (1984); Dave Haight (1987); Leroy Smith (1991); Jared DeVries (1997); Mitch King (2008); Daviyon Nixon (2020)
Linebacker of the Year	Josey Jewell (2017); Jack Campbell (2022); Jay Higgins (2024)
Defensive Back of the Year	Micah Hyde (2012); Desmond King (2015); Josh Jackson (2017); Amani Hooker (2018); Riley Moss (2021); Cooper DeJean (2023)
Kicker of the Year	Keith Duncan (2019)
Punter of the Year	Tory Taylor (2020 & 2023)
Return Specialist of the Year	Ihmir Smith-Marsette (2018); Charlie Jones (2021); Cooper DeJean (2023); Kaden Wetjen (2024 & 2025)
Coach of the Year	Hayden Fry (1981, 1990, & 1991); Kirk Ferentz (2002, 2004, 2009 & 2015)
Athlete of the Year	Chuck Long (1986)

=== All-conference selections ===
Through the 2025 season, Iowa has had 265 first team All-Big Ten selections, comprising 196 players, starting with Clyde Williams and Joe Warner in 1900. There have been 59 players named multiple years, 10 of whom were three-time selections.

Key
First selection	Second selection	Third selection

Season	Player
1900	Joe Warner
1900	Clyde Williams
1912	Jim Trickey
1913	Ralph McGinnis
1916	Fred Becker
1918	Harry Hunzelman
1918	Ronald Reed
1919	Lester Belding
1919	Aubrey Devine
1919	Fred Lohman
1919	Duke Slater
1920	Lester Belding
1920	Aubrey Devine
1920	Duke Slater
1921	Lester Belding
1921	Aubrey Devine
1921	John Heldt
1921	Max Kadesky
1921	Gordon Locke
1921	Chester Mead
1921	Duke Slater
1922	Gordon Locke
1922	Paul Minick
1922	George Thompson
1923	Lowell Otte
1924	William Fleckenstein
1924	John Hancock
1924	Lowell Otte
1924	Leland Parkin
1925	Dick Romey
1926	Emerson Nelson
1927	Emerson Nelson
1928	Richard Brown
1928	Willis Glassgow
1928	Fred Roberts
1928	Peter Westra
1929	Willis Glassgow
1929	Fred Roberts
1933	Joe Laws
1933	Francis Schammel
1934	Ozzie Simmons
1935	Ozzie Simmons
1937	Nile Kinnick
1937	Robert Lannon
1938	Erwin Prasse
1939	Mike Enich
1939	Nile Kinnick
1939	Erwin Prasse
1940	Mike Enich
1942	Tom Farmer
1946	Earl Banks
1946	Dick Hoerner
1948	William Kay
1950	Bill Reichardt
1951	Bill Reichardt
1952	Bill Fenton
1953	Jerry Hilgenberg
1953	Cal Jones
1954	Cal Jones
1955	Cal Jones
1955	Eddie Vincent
1956	Frank Gilliam
1956	Alex Karras
1956	Ken Ploen
1956	Donald Suchy
1957	Frank Bloomquist
1957	Randy Duncan
1957	Jim Gibbons
1957	Alex Karras

Season	Player
1958	Randy Duncan
1958	Willie Fleming
1959	Bob Jeter
1959	Bill Lapham
1959	Don Norton
1960	Larry Ferguson
1960	Wilburn Hollis
1960	Mark Manders
1962	Larry Ferguson
1963	Wally Hilgenberg
1963	Mike Reilly
1964	Karl Noonan
1964	Gary Snook
1965	John Niland
1968	Jon Meskimen
1968	Ed Podolak
1969	Jon Meskimen
1971	Craig Clemons
1973	Brian Rollins
1974	Earl Douthitt
1975	Joe Devlin
1975	Rod Walters
1977	Tom Rusk
1979	Jay Hilgenberg
1979	Dennis Mosley
1979	Leven Weiss
1980	Andre Tippett
1981	Mark Bortz
1981	Mel Cole
1981	Pat Dean
1981	Ron Hallstrom
1981	Lou King
1981	Reggie Roby
1981	Andre Tippett
1982	Mark Bortz
1982	Reggie Roby
1982	Bob Stoops
1983	John Alt
1983	Paul Hufford
1983	Chuck Long
1983	Dave Moritz
1983	Larry Station
1983	Mike Stoops
1984	Ronnie Harmon
1984	Paul Hufford
1984	George Little
1984	Chuck Long
1984	Devon Mitchell
1984	Larry Station
1984	Mike Stoops
1985	Jeff Drost
1985	Mike Haight
1985	Ronnie Harmon
1985	Rob Houghtlin
1985	Chuck Long
1985	Jay Norvell
1985	Hap Peterson
1985	Larry Station
1986	Rick Bayless
1986	Dave Croston
1986	Jeff Drost
1986	Dave Haight
1986	Bob Kratch
1987	Kerry Burt
1987	Marv Cook
1987	Quinn Early
1987	Dave Haight
1987	Chuck Hartlieb
1987	Rob Houghtlin

Season	Player
1988	Marv Cook
1988	Dave Haight
1988	Deven Harberts
1988	Chuck Hartlieb
1988	Bob Kratch
1988	Joe Mott
1988	Brad Quast
1989	Jim Johnson
1989	Brad Quast
1990	Nick Bell
1990	Melvin Foster
1990	Merton Hanks
1990	Jim Johnson
1990	Matt Rodgers
1991	Mike Devlin
1991	Leroy Smith
1992	Alan Cross
1992	Carlos James
1992	Mike Wells
1993	Carlos James
1993	Mike Wells
1995	Nick Gallery
1996	Jared DeVries
1996	Nick Gallery
1996	Damien Robinson
1996	Sedrick Shaw
1996	Ross Verba
1997	Tavian Banks
1997	Jared DeVries
1997	Tim Dwight
1997	Mike Goff
1998	Jared DeVries
2001	Aaron Kampman
2001	Bob Sanders
2001	Eric Steinbach
2002	Brad Banks
2002	Fred Barr
2002	Dallas Clark
2002	Colin Cole
2002	Robert Gallery
2002	Howard Hodges
2002	Nate Kaeding
2002	Bruce Nelson
2002	Fred Russell
2002	Bob Sanders
2002	Eric Steinbach
2003	Robert Gallery
2003	Abdul Hodge
2003	Nate Kaeding
2003	Matt Roth
2003	Bob Sanders
2004	Jonathan Babineaux
2004	Chad Greenway
2004	Abdul Hodge
2004	Matt Roth
2004	Drew Tate
2005	Chad Greenway
2005	Kenny Iwebema
2005	Jovon Johnson
2006	Mike Jones
2007	Mitch King
2008	Shonn Greene
2008	Mitch King
2008	Brandon Myers
2008	Seth Olsen
2009	Pat Angerer
2009	Bryan Bulaga
2009	Adrian Clayborn
2009	Tony Moeaki

Season	Player
2009	Dace Richardson
2009	Tyler Sash
2009	Amari Spievey
2010	Adrian Clayborn
2010	Derrell Johnson-Koulianos
2010	Shaun Prater
2010	Tyler Sash
2011	Marvin McNutt
2011	Shaun Prater
2011	Riley Reiff
2012	Micah Hyde
2013	B.J. Lowery
2013	Brandon Scherff
2013	C. J. Fiedorowicz
2014	Brandon Scherff
2015	Desmond King
2015	Jordan Walsh
2016	Jaleel Johnson
2016	Desmond King
2017	Josey Jewell
2017	Josh Jackson
2017	Sean Welsh
2018	Noah Fant
2018	T. J. Hockenson
2018	Amani Hooker
2018	A. J. Epenesa
2018	Ihmir Smith-Marsette
2019	A. J. Epenesa
2019	Keith Duncan
2019	Tristan Wirfs
2020	Tyler Goodson
2020	Tyler Linderbaum
2020	Alaric Jackson
2020	Chauncey Golston
2020	Daviyon Nixon
2020	Tory Taylor
2021	Tyler Linderbaum
2021	Riley Moss
2021	Dane Belton
2021	Jack Campbell
2021	Charlie Jones
2021	Caleb Shudak
2022	Sam LaPorta
2022	Jack Campbell
2022	Cooper DeJean
2022	Tory Taylor
2023	Jay Higgins
2023	Cooper DeJean
2023	Tory Taylor

Season	Player
2024	Jay Higgins
2024	Kaleb Johnson
2024	Logan Jones
2024	Connor Colby
2024	Kaden Wetjen
2025	Logan Jones
2025	Kaden Wetjen
2025	Gennings Dunker
2025	Beau Stephens

== All-time team ==
In 1989, Iowa fans selected an all-time University of Iowa football team during the 100th anniversary celebration of Iowa football. Twelve starters and eight honorable mentions were selected on both offense and defense, along with a Most Valuable Player:

Most Valuable Player
Nile Kinnick

Offense
Position	Player
E	Marv Cook
E	Jim Gibbons
OL	Mike Enich
OL	Calvin Jones
OL	Jerry Hilgenberg
OL	John Niland
OL	Duke Slater
QB	Chuck Long
RB	Ozzie Simmons
RB	Aubrey Devine
RB	Ronnie Harmon
PK	Rob Houghtlin
Honorable Mention
Position	Player
OL	Dave Croston
OL	Joe Devlin
QB	Randy Duncan
RB	Larry Ferguson
RB	Joe Laws
RB	Ed Podolak
RB	Bill Reichardt
E	Erwin Prasse

Defense
Position	Player
E	Frank Gilliam
E	Andre Tippett
DL	Mark Bortz
DL	Dave Haight
DL	Alex Karras
LB	Mike Reilly
LB	Larry Station
DB	Craig Clemons
DB	Willis Glassgow
DB	Gordon Locke
DB	Ken Ploen
P	Reggie Roby
Honorable Mention
Position	Player
E	Lester Belding
LB	Wally Hilgenberg
DB	Devon Mitchell
DE	Joe Mott
LB	Brad Quast
DB	Bill Reichardt
DB	Bob Stoops
DB	Mike Stoops

== NCAA FBS all-time records ==
The following is a list of team and individual NCAA FBS records that are held by the Iowa Hawkeyes.

- Best Perfect Passing Game - Iowa vs. Northwestern, 2002 - 12 for 12 (100 PCT.)
- Most Touchdowns on Fumble Returns - Iowa vs. Minnesota, 1994 - 2 (tied)
- Most Opponent's Field Goals Blocked, One Quarter - Iowa vs. Northern Iowa, 2009 - 2 (tied)
- Most Games Gaining 100 or More Rushing in a Season - Shonn Greene, 2008–13
- Most Consecutive Rushes for a Touchdown in a Game - Aaron Greving, Iowa vs. Kent State 2001 - 3 (tied), (TD's for 14, 1, & 26 yards)
- Highest Average per Punt in a Season (min. 40-49 punts) - Reggie Roby, 1981 - 49.8 (44 for 2,193)
- Most Passes Intercepted by a Linebacker in One Game - Grant Steen, Iowa vs. Indiana 2002 - 3 (tied)
- Players Gaining 1,000 Yards on Punt Returns and 1,000 Yards on Kickoff Returns in a Career - Tim Dwight, 1994-1997 - (1,051 & 1,133)
- Most Touchdowns Scored on Kick Returns in a Game (At Least One Punt Return & One Kickoff Return) - Kahlil Hill, Iowa vs. Western Michigan 1998 - 2 (tied)
- Most Blocked Field Goals in a Game - Kenny Iwebema, Iowa vs. Syracuse 2008 - 2 (tied)
- Passing for a Touchdown and Scoring on a Pass Reception and Punt Return in a Game - Tim Dwight, Iowa vs. Indiana 1997
- Most Field Goals Made, 50 Yards or More in a Game - Tim Douglas, Iowa vs. Illinois 1998 - 3 (tied), (51, 58, & 51 yards)

== NFL draft picks ==
Iowa has had at least one player drafted in every NFL draft since 1978. Through the 2023 NFL draft, Iowa has had 290 draft picks: 276 in the NFL, 21 in the AFL, and seven in the AAFC (the AFL and AAFC both later merged with the NFL). Iowa has had the following 26 first round NFL Draft selections:

Season	Player	Team	Selection
1936	Dick Crayne	Brooklyn Dodgers	4th
1958	Alex Karras	Detroit Lions	10th
1959	Randy Duncan	Green Bay Packers	1st
1966	John Niland	Dallas Cowboys	5th
1973	Craig Clemons	Chicago Bears	12th
1976	Rod Walters	Kansas City Chiefs	14th
1982	Ron Hallstrom	Green Bay Packers	22nd
1984	John Alt	Kansas City Chiefs	21st
1986	Chuck Long	Detroit Lions	12th
1986	Ronnie Harmon	Buffalo Bills	16th
1986	Mike Haight	New York Jets	22nd
1997	Tom Knight	Arizona Cardinals	9th
1997	Ross Verba	Green Bay Packers	30th
2003	Dallas Clark	Indianapolis Colts	24th
2004	Robert Gallery	Oakland Raiders	2nd
2006	Chad Greenway	Minnesota Vikings	17th
2010	Bryan Bulaga	Green Bay Packers	23rd
2011	Adrian Clayborn	Tampa Bay Buccaneers	20th
2012	Riley Reiff	Detroit Lions	23rd
2015	Brandon Scherff	Washington Redskins	5th
2019	T. J. Hockenson	Detroit Lions	8th
2019	Noah Fant	Denver Broncos	20th
2020	Tristan Wirfs	Tampa Bay Buccaneers	13th
2022	Tyler Linderbaum	Baltimore Ravens	25th
2023	Lukas Van Ness	Green Bay Packers	13th
2023	Jack Campbell	Detroit Lions	18th

== Hawkeye head coaches ==
Several former Hawkeye players have later been named NFL head coaches or Division I college head coaches:

Coach	Team & Years
Bret Bielema	Wisconsin, 2006–2012; Arkansas, 2013–present
Jim Caldwell	Indianapolis Colts, 2009–2011; Detroit Lions, 2014–2017
Bob Commings	Iowa, 1974–1978
Wesley Fry	Kansas State, 1935–1939
Dennis Green	Northwestern, 1981–1985; Stanford, 1989–1991; Minnesota Vikings, 1992–2001; Arizona Cardinals, 2004–2006
John G. Griffith	Iowa, 1909
Chuck Long	San Diego State, 2006–2008
Dan McCarney	Iowa State, 1995–2006; North Texas, 2011–2015
Jay Norvell	Nevada, 2017–present
Leonard Raffensperger	Iowa, 1950–1951
Bob Stoops	Oklahoma, 1999–2016
Mark Stoops	Kentucky, 2013–present
Mike Stoops	Arizona, 2004–2011
Clyde Williams	Iowa State, 1907–1912

== Other notable players ==
- See also: Iowa Players
- See also: List of Letterwinners

A few notable players not previously mentioned:

- Kinney Holbrook
- Archie Alexander
- Oran Pape
- Kevin Kasper
- Ladell Betts
- Charles Godfrey
- Albert Young
- Sean Considine
