= University of Iowa Athletics Hall of Fame =

Coordinates: 41.6665°N 91.5637°W

- Established: 2002
- Location: University of Iowa; 2425 Prairie Meadow Drive; Iowa City, Iowa, US
- Type: Hall of fame
- Director: Dale Arens (2002 – )
- Website: Official website

The University of Iowa Athletics Hall of Fame is a sports history museum located in the Roy G. Karro Building in Iowa City, Iowa, U.S. The museum pays tribute to the most legendary and influential Iowa Hawkeye sports heroes. Opened in October 2002, the building is located at the northwest corner of Melrose Avenue and Mormon Trek Boulevard. As of 2002, it was directed by Dale Arens.

== Fundraising ==
Fundraising for the building was completed by the University of Iowa Department of Intercollegiate Athletics and the University of Iowa Foundation. The largest private donation was made by Iowa alumnus Roy G. Karro, who contributed $3 million. As a result, the building was named after him.

== Exhibits ==
The University of Iowa Athletics Hall of Fame is home to many major trophies and awards, including Nile Kinnick’s Heisman Trophy, the 1958 National Football Championship Trophy and all twenty-four NCAA wrestling titles. Exhibits highlight the history and significance of famous Iowa Hawkeye players, coaches, and teams. Special exhibits are on display for the most recent inductees.

== Induction process ==
Inductions to the Hall of Fame are made once a year. The National Iowa Varsity Club selects Hall of Fame inductees through an annual vote. A student-athlete must have won at least one major letter to qualify for membership in the Varsity Club. Hall of Fame candidates are eligible for induction 10 years after lettering in a varsity sport at the University of Iowa. Coaches and school administrators are also eligible for induction.

== Inductees ==
Athletes:

- Randolph Ableman, Diving, ‘05
- Arthur Andrews, Tennis, ‘05
- Stacy Arnold, Golf, ’03
- George Baird, Track and Field, ’94
- Ed Banach, Wrestling, ’97
- Ludwig Banach, Wrestling, ’02
- Irving ”Stub” Barron, Football, Wrestling, ’98
- Leslie Beers, Wrestling ’97
- Fred H. Becker, Football, '16
- Lester Belding, Football, Track and Field, ’91
- Tom Brands, Wrestling, ’03
- Charles Brookings, Track and Field, ’90
- Fred Brown, Basketball, ‘06
- Carl Cain, Basketball, ’89
- Chris Campbell, Wrestling, ’92
- Marv Cook, Football, ‘08
- Al Couppee, Football, ’96
- Donna Lee Chung, Field Hockey ‘02
- Dick Crayne, Football, Track and Field, ‘92
- Frank Cuhel, Football, Track and Field, ‘93
- Chuck Darling, Basketball, Track and Field, ‘90
- John Davey, Swimming, ‘99
- Barry Davis, Wrestling, ‘98
- Aubrey Devine, Football, Basketball, Track and Field, ‘89
- Jack Dittmer, Football, Baseball, Basketball, ‘93
- Nan Doak-Davis, Track and Field, Cross Country, ‘99
- Duane Draves, Swimming, ‘04
- Randy Duncan, Football, ‘92
- Timothy John Dwight, Football, Track & Field, '11
- Michelle Edwards, Basketball, ‘00
- Mike Enich, Football, ‘90
- Rich Ferguson, Track and Field, Cross Country, ‘04
- Glenn Gailis, Gymnastics, ‘93
- Edward Garst Jr., Swimming, ‘01
- Jim Gibbons, Football, ‘96
- Willis Glassgow, Football, Baseball, ‘89
- Kristy Gleason, Field Hockey, ‘04
- Ed Gordon, Track and Field, ‘89
- Homer Harris, Football, ‘02
- Robert Hazlett, Gymnastics, ‘03
- Jerry Hilgenberg, Football, Baseball, ‘95
- Lincoln Hurring, Swimming, ‘01
- Dick Ives, Basketball, Baseball, ‘00
- Adolph Jacobsmeyer, Swimming, ‘02
- John Johnson, Basketball, ‘94
- Calvin Jones, Football, ‘89
- Charles “Deacon” Jones, Track and Field, ‘89
- Alex Karras, Football, ‘89
- Nile Kinnick, Football, Basketball, ‘89
- Mary Elizabeth Kobaldt, Field Hockey, '11
- Paul Krause, Football, Baseball, ‘00
- Joe Laws, Football, Baseball, ‘91
- Ronnie Lester, Basketball, ‘95
- Randy Lewis, Wrestling, ‘99
- Wentworth Lobdell, Swimming, ‘92
- Gordon Locke, Football, Baseball, ‘89
- Bill Logan, Basketball, ‘91
- Chuck Long, Football, ‘97
- Rometo “Rummy” Macias, Wrestling, ‘06
- Keith Allen McCanless, Gymnastics, '11
- Terry McCann, Wrestling, ‘89
- Lincoln McIlravy, Wrestling, ‘08
- Michael Mondane, Track and Field, ‘02
- Gary Morris, Swimming, ‘08
- Don Nelson, Basketball, ‘89
- Emerson “Spike” Nelson, Football, Track and Field, ‘95
- John Niland, Football, ‘06
- Marcia Pankratz, Field Hockey, ‘01
- Ken Ploen, Football, Track and Field, ‘90
- Erwin Prasse, Football, Basketball, Baseball, ‘89
- William Reichardt, Football, ‘01
- Charles Reilly, Football, ‘05
- Wally Ris, Swimming, ‘89
- Simon Roberts, Wrestling, ‘94
- Reggie Roby, Football, ‘06
- George Saling, Track and Field, ‘89
- Joe Scarpello, Wrestling, ‘91
- Francis William “Zud” Schammel, Football, ‘03
- Jack Sieg, Swimming, ‘97
- Ozzie Simmons, Football, ‘89
- Duke Slater, Football, Track and Field, ‘89
- Bowen Stassforth, Swimming, ‘96
- Larry Station Jr., Football, ‘05
- Walter “Stub” Stewart, Football, Basketball, Baseball, ‘00
- Kay Stormo, Track and Field, ‘08
- Rafał Szukała, Swimming, ‘06
- Sherwyn Arthur Thorson, Football, Wrestling, '11
- Emlen Tunnell, Football, ‘98
- Clifford “Ray” Walters, Swimming, ‘96
- Irving Weber, Swimming, ‘94
- Dick Westerfield, Swimming, ‘95
- Ted Wheeler, Track and Field, Cross Country, ‘00
- Larry Wieczorek, Track and Field, ‘98
- Andrea Wieland, Field Hockey, ‘08
- Murray Wier, Basketball, ‘89
- Herb Wilkinson, Basketball, Track and Field, ‘99
- Samuel Clyde Williams, Football, Baseball, Track and Field, ‘93
- Joseph Eugene William, Wrestling, '11
- Sam Williams, Basketball, ‘03
- Artur Wojdat, Swimming, ‘04
- Charles Yagla, Wrestling, ‘04
- Jim Zalesky, Wrestling, ‘02

Coaches:

- Dave Armbruster, Swimming, ‘89
- Donald Duane Banks, Baseball '11
- George Bresnahan, Track and Field, ‘91
- Francis X. Cretzmeyer, Track and Field, ‘89
- Judith Davidson, Field Hockey, ‘05
- Tom Davis, Basketball, ‘08
- Forest Evashevski, Football, ‘89
- Hayden Fry, Football, ‘04
- Dan Gable, Wrestling, ‘03
- Lawrence “Pops” Harrison, Basketball, ‘99
- Norman “Dick” Holzaepfel, Gymnastics, ‘97
- Harold Howard, Wrestling, ‘02
- Howard Jones, Football, ‘93
- Don Klotz, Tennis, ‘96
- Gary Kurdelmeier, Wrestling, ‘98
- Dave McCuskey, Wrestling, ‘92
- Ralph Miller, Basketball, ‘95
- Bucky O'Connor, Basketball, Golf, ‘90
- Lute Olson, Basketball, ‘00
- C. Vivian Stringer, Basketball, ‘06
- Otto Vogel, Baseball, ‘94
- Charles Zwiener, Golf, ‘01

Administrators:

- Paul Brechler, Athletic Director, ‘90
- Bump Elliott, Athletic Director, ‘97
- Christine Grant, Athletic Director, ‘06
- Virgil Hancher, UI president, ‘01
- Karl Leib, Faculty Representative, ‘92
- William D. “Shorty” Paul, Physician, ‘99
- Robert Ray, Faculty Representative, ‘91
- E. G. “Dad” Schroeder, Athletic Director, ‘93
- William “Bud” Suter, Athletic Relations, ‘98
- George Wine, Sports Information, ‘00
- Eric Wilson, Sports Information, ‘89

== See also ==
- Glen Brand Wrestling Hall of Fame of Iowa
- Iowa Sports Hall of Fame
