= Fred Becker =

American football player (1895–1918)

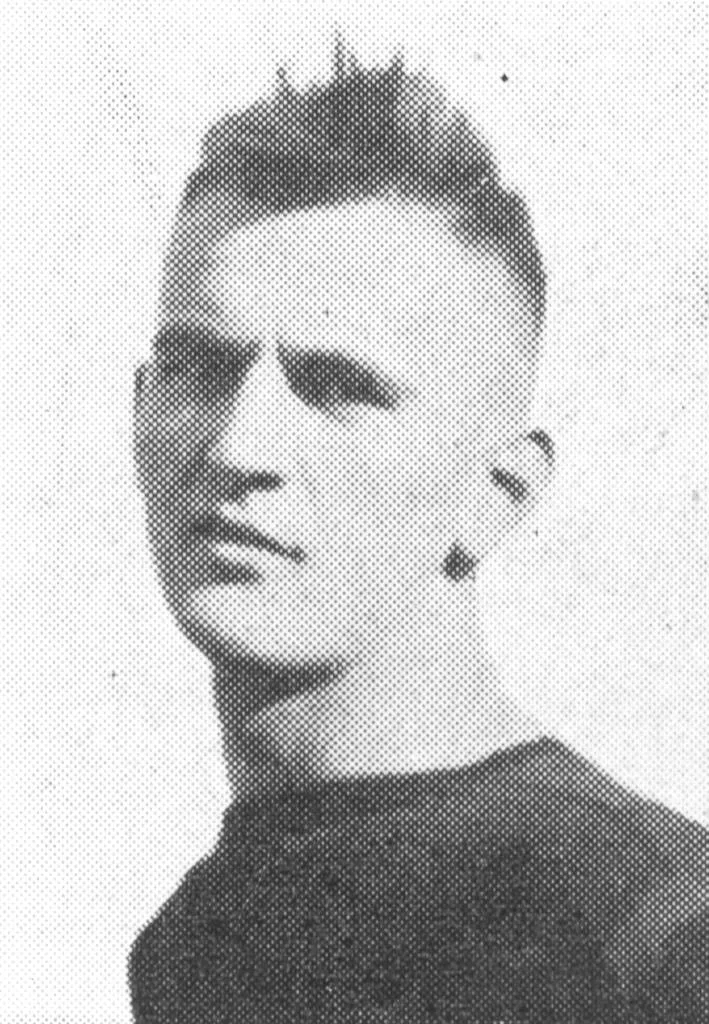
- Fred whilst attending the University of Iowa

Iowa Hawkeyes
- Position: Tackle

Personal information
- Born: November 6, 1895; Waterloo, Iowa
- Died: July 18, 1918 (aged 22); Soissons, France

Career information
- College: Iowa (1916)

Awards and highlights
- All-American (1916)

Fred H. Becker (November 6, 1895 – July 18, 1918) was an American college football player for the University of Iowa. He was a first team All-American in 1916, the first Hawkeye in any sport to earn first team All-American honors. He died at age 22 fighting in World War I.

== Playing career ==
Fred Becker graduated from Waterloo East High School in 1914. From there, Becker went on to play football for the University of Iowa. In his only season as a sophomore in 1916, Becker was a standout on the Iowa squad. In Iowa's 19-16 victory over Iowa State, he became the first known Hawkeye to block two opposing punts.

Walter Eckersall of the Chicago Tribune named Becker a first team All-American. He was the first Hawkeye in any sport to achieve such a high honor. Eckersall wrote, "No matter where he was placed, his work was a feature. He was strong and powerful and quick to size up the attack of his opponents. He seldom failed to open holes for the backs and was on top of the play all year."

== Military service and honors ==
Becker's football achievements would end after only one season. Within a month after the United States entered World War I, Becker enlisted. After completing accelerated training he was commissioned as a 2nd Lt. in the U.S. Army. Due to officer shortages in the Marines he was assigned to the 18th Company, 2nd Battalion of the 5th Marine Regiment (a.k.a. 2/5), 4th Marine Brigade. He sailed for France in September 1917. After a short training period he was in the front line in the Verdun area for a couple months. Later he was wounded by artillery in the opening stages of the Battle of Belleau Wood on June 3, 1918. After a month of recuperation he was reassigned to the 55th Company as commander of the lead platoon under new company commander 2nd Lt. Elliot D. Cooke. On July 18, 1918, Becker was killed in action during the Battle of Soissons (1918). During the battle he went forward of his men and attacked machine gun nests, one of which he destroyed by himself saving many men of his unit. Soon after while leading his platoon, he was killed by an artillery shell that also wounded his friend Elliot D. Cooke, who was standing right next to him. For his courage and valor in battle he was awarded the Distinguished Service Cross, America's second highest wartime honor, Silver Star, and France awarded him the Croix de Guerre, their highest honor.

Becker's story was forgotten for decades until Mike Chapman, author and historian from Waterloo, began doing research in 2008. He wrote an article on Becker for the Iowa-Purdue Football program of Nov. 15, 2008, and that sparked a great deal of interest around the state. Nearly a year later, in 2009, Becker was inducted into the University of Iowa Athletics Hall of Fame. Since no living relatives could be found, Chapman was invited to accept the honor on behalf of Fred Becker, at halftime of the Iowa-Northern Iowa football game on Sept. 5, 2009. Several months later, East Waterloo High School inducted Becker into its athletic hall of fame, with Chapman once again accepting on his behalf. Becker's living relatives, his sister Hilda Poettinger's grandchildren live outside the Philadelphia PA area.

Fred Becker appeared on the cover of the October 2009 issue of the Iowa History Journal, which carried a long story. He is also featured in the 2010 book entitled Triumph and Tragedy: The Inspiring Stories of Football Legends Fred Becker, Jack Trice, Nile Kinnick and Johnny Bright.

On January 10, the Board of Education of the Waterloo school district voted unanimously to name its newest school Fred Becker Elementary.
