= Jerry Hilgenberg =

American football player and coach (1931–2024)

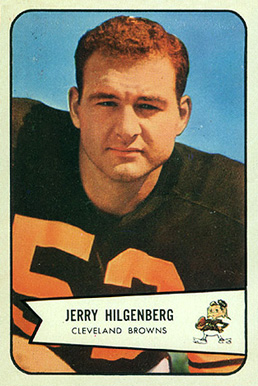
Hilgenberg on a 1954 Bowman football card

Jerry Hilgenberg (April 9, 1931 – January 14, 2024) was an American football player and coach for the University of Iowa. He was a first team All-American in 1953 and served as an assistant coach to the Iowa football team for eight seasons.

== Background ==
Jerry Hilgenberg was born on April 9, 1931. He attended Wilton Junction High School in Wilton, Iowa. Wilton Junction did not even have a football program until his senior year, so Hilgenberg played just one season as a high school running back. Despite that, he was inducted into the Iowa High School Football Players Hall of Fame. He walked on to Leonard Raffensperger’s Iowa football team in 1950 as a quarterback but was quickly converted to the center and linebacker positions.

== Iowa career ==
Hilgenberg started at Iowa for three seasons from 1951 to 1953. In his senior season in 1953, Iowa finished the year ranked in the top ten in the nation for the first time since the Ironmen in 1939. Jerry Hilgenberg played a large role in that, being named a first team All-American after the season. He was Coach Forest Evashevski’s first All-American at Iowa. He was also the captain of the baseball team as a senior.

Hilgenberg was drafted in the fourth round of the 1954 NFL draft by the National Football League’s Cleveland Browns. He was also drafted by the U.S. Air Force, halting his professional career. When he returned from service, he was hired as an Iowa assistant football coach from 1956-1963. During that time, the Hawkeyes won three Big Ten conference titles and two Rose Bowls. Jerry Hilgenberg was also able to coach his younger brother, Wally Hilgenberg. Wally became a star both for the Hawkeyes and the Minnesota Vikings.

== Death ==
Hilgenberg died January 14, 2024, at the age of 92.

== Honors ==
Two of Jerry Hilgenberg’s sons, Joel Hilgenberg and Jay Hilgenberg, became very successful players at the University of Iowa and in the NFL. In 1989, Iowa fans selected an all-time University of Iowa football team during the 100th anniversary celebration of Iowa football, and Jerry Hilgenberg was selected as an offensive lineman. He was inducted into the University of Iowa Athletics Hall of Fame in 1995, and his brother and two sons were inducted eight years later.
