= Iowa Sports Hall of Fame =

Hall of Fame dedicated to Iowa athletes

The Iowa Sports Hall of Fame, sponsored by the Des Moines Register, honors outstanding athletes and sports contributors. To be eligible, members must have either been born in Iowa or gained prominence while competing for a college or university in Iowa.

Leighton Housh, former executive sports editor of the Register, established the Hall of Fame in 1951. Twenty-four athletes were chosen in the inaugural class. The Hall of Fame now includes more than 170 athletes from 20 sports. Inductees are chosen by veteran members of the Register's sports department.

== Partial list of inductees ==
=== Football ===
- 1951 - Jay Berwanger
- 1951 - Aubrey Devine
- 1951 - Nile Kinnick
- 1951 - Elmer Layden
- 1951 - Duke Slater
- 1956 - Clyde Williams
- 1958 - Gordon Locke
- 1959 - Billy Edson
- 1961 - Joe Laws
- 1962 - Eddie Anderson
- 1970 - Johnny Bright
- 1971 - Cal Jones
- 1973 - Willis Glassgow
- 1975 - Emlen Tunnell
- 1976 - Randy Duncan
- 1977 - Alex Karras
- 1980 - Don Perkins
- 1983 - Mike Enich
- 1985 - Paul Krause
- 1986 - Ed Podolak
- 1987 - Wally Hilgenberg
- 1989 - Forest Evashevski
- 1998 - Roger Craig
- 1999 - Matt Blair
- 2000 - Larry Station
- 2001 - Chuck Long
- 2002 - Ken Ploen
- 2002 - Chad Hennings
- 2003 - Reggie Roby
- 2006 - Andre Tippett
- 2012 - Marv Levy
- 2013 - Tavian Banks
- 2014 - Tim Dwight
- 2015 - Earle Bruce
- 2015 - Bob Harlan
- 2016 - Troy Davis
- 2017 - Andre Tippett

=== Basketball ===
- 1951 - Murray Wier
- 1980 - Carl Cain
- 1983 - Don Nelson
- 1990 - Fred Brown
- 1993 - John Johnson
- 1994 - Ronnie Lester
- 1999 - Bobby Hansen
- 2017 - Jan Jensen
- 2019 - Brenda Frese

=== Baseball ===
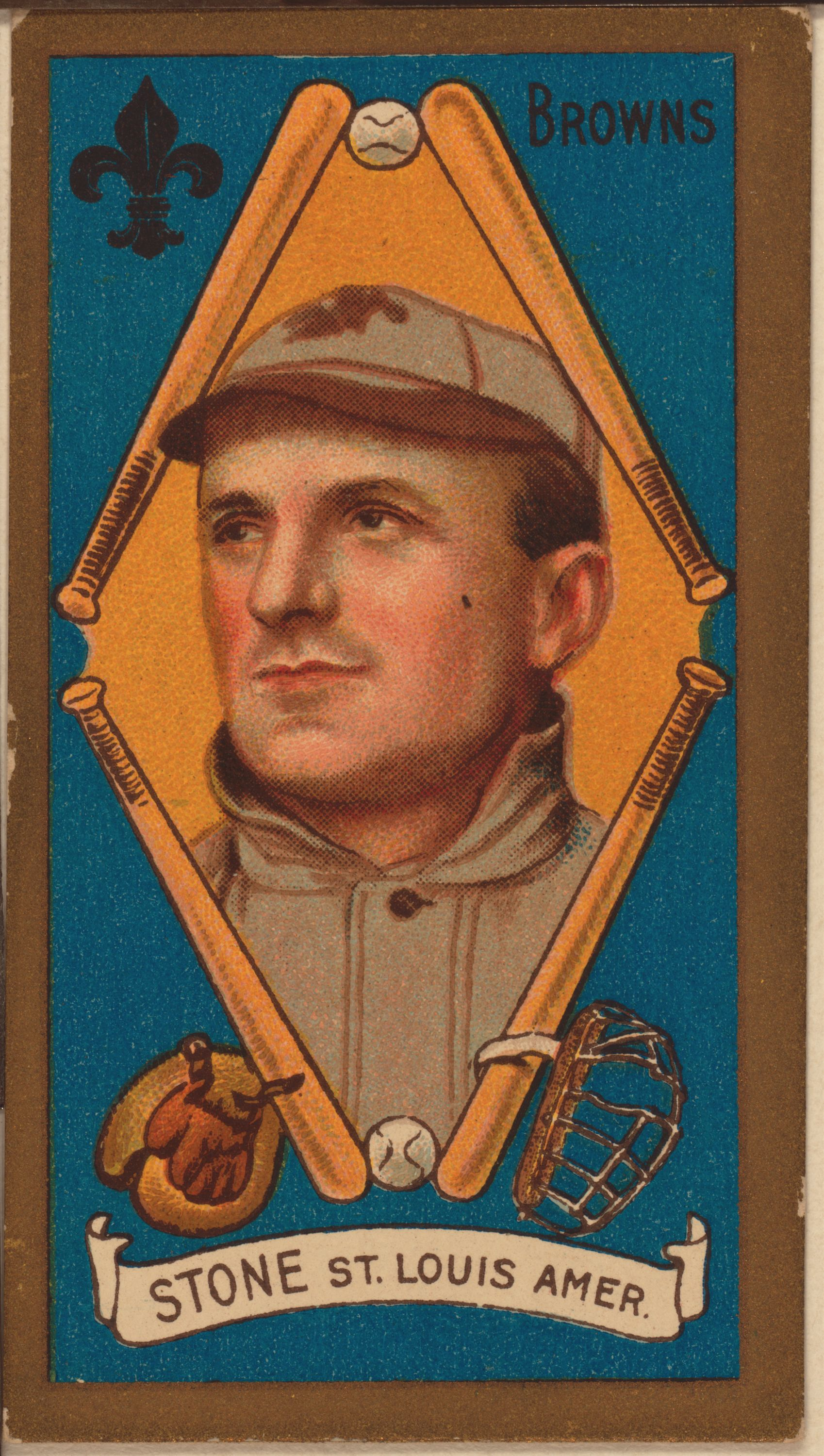
George Stone

- 1951 - Cap Anson
- 1951 - Fred Clarke
- 1951 - Red Faber
- 1951 - Bob Feller
- 1952 - Dazzy Vance
- 1954 - Dave Bancroft
- 1956 - Jack Coombs
- 1961 - Bing Miller
- 1962 - Hank Severeid
- 1963 - Earl Whitehill
- 1965 - Hal Trosky
- 1968 - Cal McVey
- 1970 - George Stone
- 1976 - George Pipgras
- 1984 - Chet Brewer
- 1988 - Jack Dittmer
- 2000 - Mike Boddicker

=== Other sports ===
- 1951 - Farmer Burns, wrestling
- 1951 - Sabin Carr, track and field
- 1951 - Welker Cochran, billiards
- 1951 - Frank Gotch, wrestling
- 1951 - George Saling, track and field
- 1951 - Morgan Taylor, track and field
- 1952 - Earl Caddock, wrestling
- 1959 - Harris Coggeshall, tennis
- 1963 - Ray Conger, track and field
- 1972 - Garfield Wood, speedboat racing
- 1972 - Jack Fleck, golf
- 1973 - Frank Wykoff, track and field
- 1981 - Doreen Wilber, archery
- 1981 - Dan Gable, wrestling
- 1982 - Bruce Jenner, track and field
- 1990 - Tiny Lund, auto racing
- 1993 - Francis Cretzmeyer, track and field
- 1993 - Chris Taylor, wrestling
- 1994 - Nawal El Moutawakel, track and field
- 1997 - Judy Kimball, golf
- 1997 - Bob Strampe, bowling
- 2003 - Danny Harris, track
- 2012 - Cael Sanderson, wrestling
- 2015 - Shawn Johnson, gymnast
- 2017 - Kip Janvrin, track and field

== See also ==
- Glen Brand Wrestling Hall of Fame of Iowa
- Iowa State University Athletics Hall of Fame
- University of Iowa Athletics Hall of Fame
