= E. G. Schroeder =

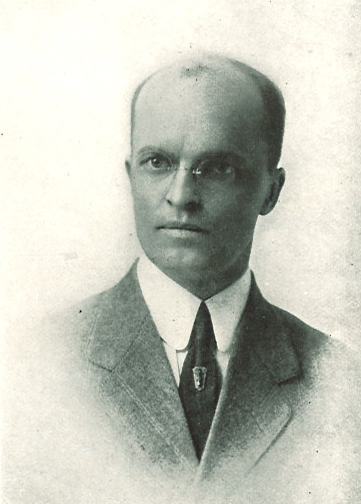
Schroeder from 1913 Hawkeye

Ernest Gustav "Dad" Schroeder (1882 – February 23, 1960) was an athletic director for the University of Iowa for 11 years and the first wrestling and tennis coach in school history.

== Coaching career ==
Schroeder was born in Germany in 1882 and moved to the United States at age six. He attended Simpson College, where he participated in gymnastics and wrestling. He later coached basketball at the school. Schroeder went to the University of Iowa in 1907 to study medicine but soon got involved in coaching at Iowa as well.

Schroeder wanted all college students to get involved in athletics. His fatherly concern for his students and athletes earned him the nickname "Dad". He is considered the founder of intramural athletics at Iowa. Schroeder served as Iowa's first wrestling coach from 1911 to 1915 and in 1921 and was a member of the Olympic wrestling committee in 1936. He was also Iowa's first varsity tennis coach from 1923 to 1937.

== Athletic director ==
In 1936, Iowa's head football coach and athletic director, Ossie Solem, left to take the position of head football coach at Syracuse University. On January 18, 1937, "Dad" Schroeder was appointed to succeed Solem as Iowa's athletic director. He presided over the athletic department for 11 years from 1937 to 1947. During that time, he helped reduce the athletic department's debt from the building of the Fieldhouse and Iowa Stadium and lead the athletic department out of financial danger. Before the 1939 football season, Schroeder wanted to hire Eddie Anderson as Iowa's head football coach. Schroeder offered to give Anderson his job as athletic director as well if it would convince Anderson to relocate to Iowa City. Anderson eventually accepted the coaching job but turned down Schroeder's offer of the position of athletic director.

Schroeder helped keep the athletic department going during World War II, when the Pre-Flight Officer training program took over many of Iowa's athletic facilities. He retired as athletic director in 1947 and remained with the university as a part-time instructor until 1952.
