= Iowa–Minnesota football rivalry =

American college football rivalry

- Iowa Hawkeyes Minnesota Golden Gophers
- First meeting: November 2, 1891; Minnesota, 42–4
- Latest meeting: October 24, 2026; Minnesota, 13–10
- Next meeting: 2027 at Iowa City, IA
- Trophy: Floyd of Rosedale

Statistics
- Total meetings: 120
- All-time series: Minnesota leads, 64–54–2 (.542)
- Trophy series: Iowa leads, 46–44–2 (.511)
- Largest victory: Minnesota, 75–0 (1903)
- Longest win streak: Minnesota, 12 (1891–1916)
- Current win streak: Minnesota, 1 (2026–present)

Locations of Minnesota and Iowa

The Iowa–Minnesota football rivalry is an American college football rivalry between the Iowa Hawkeyes football team of the University of Iowa and Minnesota Golden Gophers football team of the University of Minnesota. The Floyd of Rosedale, introduced in 1935, is a bronze trophy in the shape of a pig which is awarded to the winner of the game.

== History ==
Floyd of Rosedale in 2006 at the University of Minnesota Building at the Minnesota State Fair

The 1934 game between the Hawkeyes and Golden Gophers had been filled with controversy over the treatment of Iowa star halfback Ozzie Simmons. Simmons was also one of the few black football players of that era, and several rough hits by the Gophers on Simmons forced him to leave the game multiple times in Minnesota’s 48–12 victory. “What it amounted to was that they were piling on – late hits,” Simmons recalled. “I had bruised ribs...they came at me with knees high, and some of it was pretty obvious.”

The following year, Coach Bernie Bierman’s Gophers were 5–0, and Coach Ossie Solem’s Hawkeyes were 4–0–1. Before the 1935 Iowa–Minnesota contest in Iowa City, Bierman received a flood of threatening letters from Iowa fans. He requested and received special police protection for the team when it detrained in Iowa a couple of days before the contest.

The day before the game, Iowa Governor Clyde L. Herring told reporters, "If the officials stand for any rough tactics like Minnesota used last year, I'm sure the crowd won't." Herring’s message was clear. “What he was saying was, ‘If you treat Ozzie like you treated him last year, we’re coming out of the stands,’” Simmons said.

The news quickly reached Minnesota. Coach Bierman threatened to break off athletic relations. Minnesota Attorney General Harry H. Peterson practically accused the Iowa governor of thuggery. "Your remark that the crowd at the Iowa–Minnesota game will not stand for any rough tactics is calculated to incite a riot," said Peterson. "It is a breach of your duty as governor, and evidences an unsportsmanlike, cowardly and contemptible frame of mind."

To lighten the mood, Minnesota Governor Floyd Olson sent a telegram to Governor Herring on game-day morning, which read, "Minnesota folks are excited over your statement about Iowa crowds lynching the Minnesota football team. I have assured them you are law abiding gentlemen and are only trying to get our goat...I will bet you a Minnesota prize hog against an Iowa prize hog that Minnesota wins."

The Iowa governor accepted, and word of the bet reached Iowa City as the crowd gathered at the stadium. The situation calmed, and the game proceeded without incident. Minnesota won 13–6, and Iowa star Ozzie Simmons played an injury-free game. Afterward, Minnesota players went out of their way to compliment Simmons, and Simmons praised the Gophers for their clean, hard-fought play. Minnesota went on to win their second straight national championship.

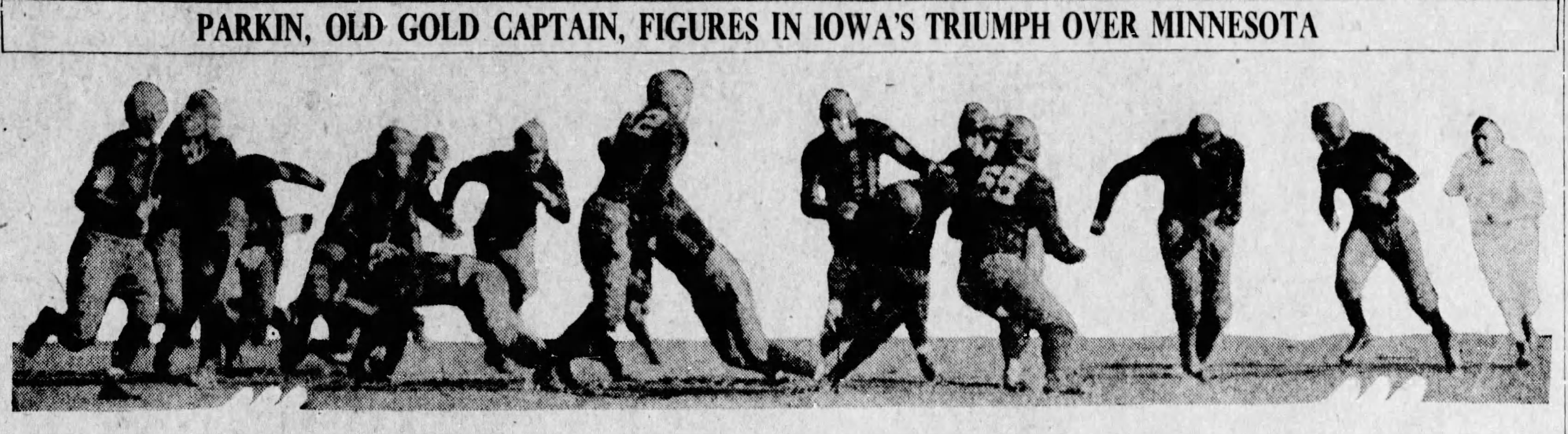
Leland Parkin runs ball for Iowa against Minnesota, Oct.25, 1924

Governor Herring obtained an award-winning prize pig which had been donated by Allen Loomis, the owner of Rosedale Farms near Fort Dodge, Iowa. Dubbed Floyd after Minnesota Governor Olson, the pig was the brother of Blue Boy from Will Rogers' movie State Fair. A few days later, Governor Herring collected "Floyd of Rosedale" and personally walked him into Governor Olson’s carpeted office.

Iowa social crusader Virgil Case swore out a criminal warrant in Des Moines against Governor Herring, alleging that the bet violated Iowa gambling laws. Herring jokingly stated that he had retained Governor Olson as his attorney, who argued that it was not a true bet because Herring did not have a chance of winning it. However, an assistant Iowa attorney general convinced a judge to dismiss on jurisdictional grounds because the bet had been made in Minnesota and Iowa City, beyond the local court's jurisdiction. Case also argued that the governors were guilty of violating federal gambling laws because the pig had been placed into interstate commerce when Herring made good on the bet, but the U.S. Attorneys declined to prosecute. President Franklin Roosevelt's former son-in-law, Curtis Dall, who attended the 1935 game as a guest of the governors, suggested that they name the pig "New Deal." Herring vetoed that proposal.

Governor Olson later offered Floyd up as the grand prize in a statewide essay-writing contest, which was won by 14-year-old Robert Jones. However, Floyd ended up on Donald Gjerdrum’s family farm. Unfortunately, the living “Floyd of Rosedale” wasn’t vaccinated, something that came as a surprise to Gjerdrum’s father, who assumed since it came from the university it would be up-to-date on its shots. Floyd died of cholera just eight months after making headlines, but the “Floyd of Rosedale” trophy tradition lives on.

Since the two schools could not continue wagering a live pig, Governor Olson commissioned Saint Paul sculptor Charles Brioschi to capture Floyd's image. The result is a 98 lb (44 kg) bronze pig trophy, 21 in (53 cm) long and 15 in (38 cm) high. Iowa and Minnesota have played for the Floyd of Rosedale every year since then. The winner of the game is entitled to keep the trophy until the following year's contest.

One of the rivalry's most notable games was in the 1960 college football season when undefeated No. 3 Minnesota met undefeated No. 1 Iowa in Minneapolis. The game was for the Big Ten Conference championship, the 1961 Rose Bowl berth, and the No. 1 ranking. Minnesota won 27–10.

== Game results ==
Iowa victories	Minnesota victories	Tie games

No.	Date	Location	Winner	Score
1	November 2, 1891	Iowa City, IA	Minnesota	42–4
2	October 26, 1901	Minneapolis, MN	Minnesota	16–0
3	October 25, 1902	Iowa City, IA	Minnesota	34–0
4	October 17, 1903	Minneapolis, MN	Minnesota	75–0
5	November 28, 1904	Cedar Rapids, IA	Minnesota	11–0
6	October 21, 1905	Minneapolis, MN	Minnesota	39–0
7	October 2, 1909	Minneapolis, MN	Minnesota	41–0
8	October 28, 1911	Minneapolis, MN	Minnesota	24–6
9	October 26, 1912	Minneapolis, MN	Minnesota	56–7
10	October 24, 1914	Iowa City, IA	Minnesota	7–0
11	October 23, 1915	Minneapolis, MN	Minnesota	51–13
12	October 28, 1916	Minneapolis, MN	Minnesota	67–0
13	November 9, 1918	Iowa City, IA	Iowa	6–0
14	October 25, 1919	Minneapolis, MN	Iowa	9–6
15	November 13, 1920	Iowa City, IA	Iowa	28–7
16	November 5, 1921	Minneapolis, MN	Iowa	41–7
17	November 11, 1922	Iowa City, IA	Iowa	28–14
18	November 27, 1923	Minneapolis, MN	Minnesota	20–7
19	October 25, 1924	Iowa City, IA	Iowa	13–0
20	November 14, 1925	Minneapolis, MN	Minnesota	33–0
21	November 6, 1926	Iowa City, IA	Minnesota	41–0
22	October 22, 1927	Minneapolis, MN	Minnesota	38–0
23	October 22, 1928	Iowa City, IA	Iowa	7–6
24	November 9, 1929	Iowa City, IA	Iowa	9–7
25	October 24, 1931	Minneapolis, MN	Minnesota	34–0
26	October 22, 1932	Iowa City, IA	Minnesota	21–6
27	October 28, 1933	Minneapolis, MN	Minnesota	19–7
28	October 28, 1934	Iowa City, IA	Minnesota	48–12
29	November 9, 1935†	Iowa City, IA	Minnesota	13–6
30	November 7, 1936	Minneapolis, MN	No. 2 Minnesota	52–0
31	November 6, 1937	Iowa City, IA	No. 14 Minnesota	35–10
32	November 5, 1938	Minneapolis, MN	No. 12 Minnesota	28–0
33	November 18, 1939	Iowa City, IA	Iowa	13–9
34	October 26, 1940	Minneapolis, MN	No. 6 Minnesota	34–6
35	November 15, 1941	Iowa City, IA	No. 1 Minnesota	34–13
36	November 14, 1942	Minneapolis, MN	No. 16 Minnesota	27–7
37	November 13, 1943	Minneapolis, MN	Minnesota	33–14
38	November 18, 1944	Iowa City, IA	Minnesota	46–0
39	November 17, 1945	Iowa City, IA	Iowa	20–19
40	November 16, 1946	Minneapolis, MN	Minnesota	16–6
41	November 15, 1947	Iowa City, IA	Iowa	13–7
42	November 13, 1948	Iowa City, IA	No. 14 Minnesota	28–21
43	November 5, 1949	Minneapolis, MN	No. 9 Minnesota	55–7
44	November 4, 1950	Minneapolis, MN	Iowa	13–0
45	November 3, 1951	Iowa City, IA	Tie	20–20
46	November 1, 1952	Minneapolis, MN	Minnesota	17–7
47	November 14, 1953	Iowa City, IA	Iowa	27–0
48	November 13, 1954	Minneapolis, MN	#13 Minnesota	22–20
49	November 5, 1955	Iowa City, IA	Iowa	26–0
50	November 10, 1956	Minneapolis, MN	Iowa	7–0
51	November 9, 1957	Iowa City, IA	Iowa	44–20
52	November 8, 1958	Minneapolis, MN	Iowa	28–6
53	November 7, 1959	Iowa City, IA	Iowa	33–0
54	November 5, 1960	Minneapolis, MN	#3 Minnesota	27–10
55	November 11, 1961	Iowa City, IA	#5 Minnesota	16–9
56	November 10, 1962	Minneapolis, MN	#10 Minnesota	10–0
57	November 9, 1963	Iowa City, IA	Iowa	27–13
58	November 7, 1964	Minneapolis, MN	Minnesota	14–13
59	October 16, 1965	Iowa City, IA	Minnesota	14–3
60	October 15, 1966	Minneapolis, MN	Minnesota	17–0
61	November 4, 1967	Iowa City, IA	Minnesota	10–0

No.	Date	Location	Winner	Score
62	November 2, 1968	Minneapolis, MN	Iowa	35–28
63	November 1, 1969	Iowa City, IA	Minnesota	35–8
64	October 31, 1970	Minneapolis, MN	Tie	14–14
65	October 16, 1971	Iowa City, IA	Minnesota	19–14
66	October 21, 1972	Minneapolis, MN	Minnesota	43–14
67	October 20, 1973	Iowa City, IA	Minnesota	31–23
68	October 19, 1974	Minneapolis, MN	Minnesota	23–17
69	October 25, 1975	Iowa City, IA	Minnesota	31–7
70	October 23, 1976	Minneapolis, MN	Iowa	22–12
71	October 8, 1977	Iowa City, IA	Iowa	18–6
72	October 14, 1978	Minneapolis, MN	Minnesota	22–20
73	October 20, 1979	Iowa City, IA	Minnesota	24–7
74	October 25, 1980	Minneapolis, MN	Minnesota	24–6
75	October 24, 1981	Iowa City, IA	Minnesota	12–10
76	October 23, 1982	Minneapolis, MN	Iowa	21–16
77	November 19, 1983	Iowa City, IA	Iowa	61–10
78	November 17, 1984	Minneapolis, MN	Minnesota	23–17
79	November 23, 1985	Iowa City, IA	#3 Iowa	31–9
80	November 22, 1986	Minneapolis, MN	Iowa	30–27
81	November 21, 1987	Iowa City, IA	Iowa	34–20
82	November 19, 1988	Minneapolis, MN	Iowa	31–22
83	November 25, 1989	Iowa City, IA	Minnesota	43–7
84	November 24, 1990	Minneapolis, MN	Minnesota	31–24
85	November 23, 1991	Iowa City, IA	#8 Iowa	23–8
86	November 21, 1992	Minneapolis, MN	Minnesota	28–13
87	November 20, 1993	Iowa City, IA	Iowa	21–3
88	November 19, 1994	Minneapolis, MN	Iowa	49–42
89	November 25, 1995	Iowa City, IA	Iowa	45–3
90	November 23, 1996	Minneapolis, MN	#24 Iowa	43–24
91	November 22, 1997	Iowa City, IA	Iowa	31–0
92	November 21, 1998	Minneapolis, MN	Minnesota	49–7
93	November 20, 1999	Iowa City, IA	#17 Minnesota	25–21
94	November 18, 2000	Minneapolis, MN	Minnesota	27–24
95	November 17, 2001	Iowa City, IA	Iowa	42–24
96	November 16, 2002	Minneapolis, MN	No. 6 Iowa	45–21
97	November 15, 2003	Iowa City, IA	No. 20 Iowa	40–22
98	November 14, 2004	Minneapolis, MN	No. 19 Iowa	29–27
99	November 19, 2005	Iowa City, IA	Iowa	52–28
100	November 18, 2006	Minneapolis, MN	Minnesota	34–24
101	November 10, 2007	Iowa City, IA	Iowa	21–16
102	November 22, 2008	Minneapolis, MN	Iowa	55–0
103	November 21, 2009	Iowa City, IA	No. 13 Iowa	12–0
104	November 27, 2010	Minneapolis, MN	Minnesota	27–24
105	October 29, 2011	Minneapolis, MN	Minnesota	22–21
106	September 29, 2012	Iowa City, IA	Iowa	31–13
107	September 28, 2013	Minneapolis, MN	Iowa	23–7
108	November 8, 2014	Minneapolis, MN	Minnesota	51–14
109	November 14, 2015	Iowa City, IA	No. 5 Iowa	40–35
110	October 8, 2016	Minneapolis, MN	Iowa	14–7
111	October 28, 2017	Iowa City, IA	Iowa	17–10
112	October 6, 2018	Minneapolis, MN	Iowa	48–31
113	November 16, 2019	Iowa City, IA	No. 20 Iowa	23–19
114	November 13, 2020	Minneapolis, MN	Iowa	35–7
115	November 13, 2021	Iowa City, IA	No. 20 Iowa	27–22
116	November 19, 2022	Minneapolis, MN	Iowa	13–10
117	October 21, 2023	Iowa City, IA	Minnesota	12–10
118	September 21, 2024	Minneapolis, MN	Iowa	31–14
119	October 25, 2025	Iowa City, IA	Iowa	41–3
120	October 24, 2026	Minneapolis, MN	Minnesota	13–10
Series: Minnesota leads 64–54–2

† Live pig "Floyd of Rosedale" wagered between Governors Floyd Olson and Clyde L. Herring in 1935

== See also ==
- List of NCAA college football rivalry games
- List of most-played college football series in NCAA Division I
