= Jack Campbell (American football) =

American football player (born 2000)

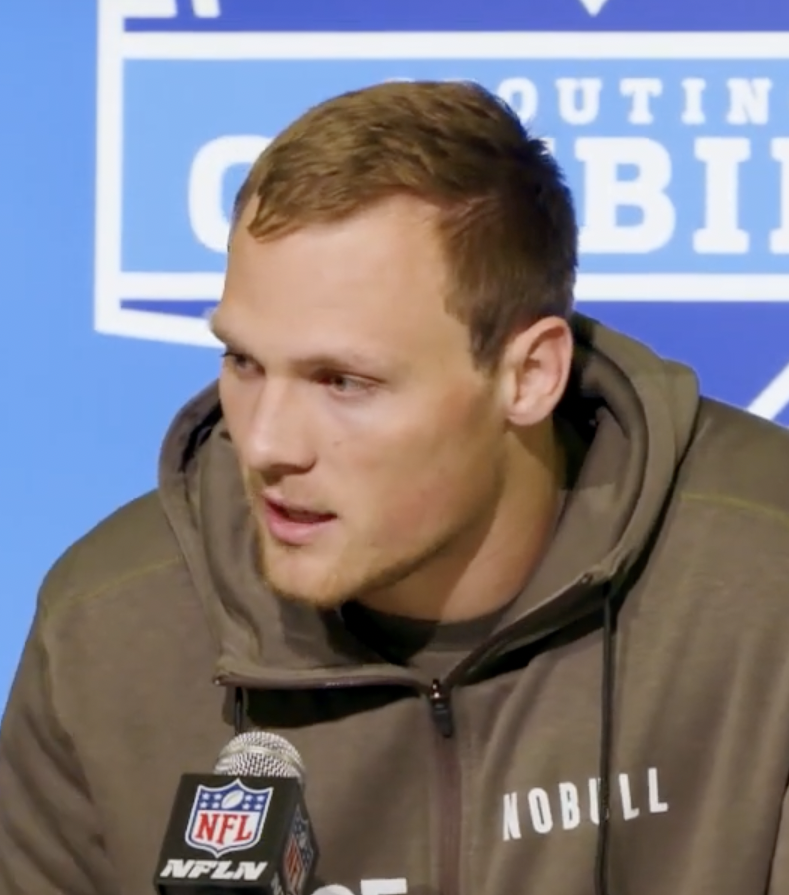
- Campbell at the 2023 NFL Combine

No. 46 – Detroit Lions
- Position: Linebacker
- Roster status: Injured reserve

Personal information
- Born: August 22, 2000 (age 26); Cedar Falls, Iowa, U.S.
- Listed height: 6 ft 5 in (1.96 m)
- Listed weight: 246 lb (112 kg)

Career information
- High school: Cedar Falls
- College: Iowa (2019–2022)
- NFL draft: 2023: 1st round, 18th overall pick

Career history
- Detroit Lions (2023–present)

Awards and highlights
- First-team All-Pro (2025); Butkus Award (pro) (2025); Pro Bowl (2025); PFWA All-Rookie Team (2023); Butkus Award (college) (2022); William V. Campbell Trophy (2022); Unanimous All-American (2022); Second-team All-American (2021); Big Ten Defensive Player of the Year (2022); Big Ten Linebacker of the Year (2022); 2× First-team All-Big Ten (2021, 2022)

Career NFL statistics as of Week 5, 2026
- Total tackles: 445
- Sacks: 8.5
- Forced fumbles: 4
- Fumble recoveries: 3
- Pass deflections: 10
- Stats at Pro Football Reference

Jack Campbell (born August 22, 2000) is an American professional football linebacker for the Detroit Lions of the National Football League (NFL). He was a unanimous All-American playing college football for the Iowa Hawkeyes, winning the Butkus Award in 2022. Campbell was selected by the Lions in the first round of the 2023 NFL draft, and named to the All-Rookie Team. He earned his first Pro Bowl and All-Pro selections in 2025, as well as being the professional Butkus Award recipient.

== Early life ==
Campbell attended Cedar Falls High School in Cedar Falls, Iowa. As a Junior and Senior, he led Cedar Falls to back-to-back 4A State Basketball Championships in 2018 and 2019, respectively. During his football career he had a school record 338 career tackles. He committed to the University of Iowa to play college football.

== College career ==
As a true freshman at Iowa in 2019, Campbell played in 11 games and had five tackles. As a sophomore in 2020, he played in five games and had 29 tackles, one sack and one interception. He returned as a starter his junior year in 2021, recording 140 tackles, two interceptions, a sack and a touchdown. After the 2021 season, Campbell was named first-team all Big Ten, leading one of the best defenses in the country.

Campbell returned to Iowa in 2022 and was named the preseason Big Ten defensive player of the year by Big Ten media. Campbell led the elite Iowa defense in 2022 to a nationwide best in yards per play average and top five in total defense and defensive efficiency. Campbell finished the regular season with 118 tackles, ranking second in the Big Ten and tied for 13th nationally, adding two interceptions, one recovered fumble and one forced fumble. Against Minnesota, Campbell's forced fumble and long interception return, both in the fourth quarter, enabled Iowa's victory despite being outgained and having much less time of possession.

Following the season, Campbell was given the 2022 Butkus Award as the top linebacker in college football as well as the William V. Campbell Trophy as a scholar-athlete. He was also named the Big Ten's Nagurski–Woodson Defensive Player of the Year and Butkus–Fitzgerald Linebacker of the Year.

== Professional career ==
Pre-draft measurables
Height	Weight	Arm length	Hand span	Wingspan	40-yard dash	10-yard split	20-yard split	20-yard shuttle	Three-cone drill	Vertical jump	Broad jump
6 ft 4 5/8 in (1.95 m)	249 lb (113 kg)	31 7/8 in (0.81 m)	10 1/4 in (0.26 m)	6 ft 6 1/4 in (1.99 m)	4.65 s	1.59 s	2.67 s	4.24 s	6.74 s	37.5 in (0.95 m)	10 ft 8 in (3.25 m)
All values from the NFL Combine

Campbell was selected with the 18th pick in the 2023 NFL draft by the Detroit Lions. Campbell recorded his first career sack in a Week 3, 20–6 victory over the Atlanta Falcons. Following the end of the regular season, Campbell was named to the PFWA All-Rookie Team.

On April 28, 2026, the Lions declined the fifth-year option on Campbell's contract, making him set to become a free agent after the 2026 season. However, on May 21, the Lions signed Campbell to a four-year, $81 million contract extension that runs through the 2030 season.

On November 1, 2026, during a Week 8 matchup against the Minnesota Vikings, Campbell was involved in a tackle on Vikings tight end T. J. Hockenson in which he suffered a neck injury that left him lying on the field motionless for more than eight minutes. He was transported to a local hospital where he underwent evaluation overnight and treatment. On November 4, Campbell released a statement revealing he had full movement in his lower extremities, and he was still making progress with movement in his upper extremities. He was placed on injured reserve on November 7.

== Personal life ==
Campbell is a Christian. He is married to Megan Campbell. They have one son together.

== NFL career statistics ==
Legend
**Bold**	Career high

=== Regular season ===
Year	Team	Games		Tackles					Fumbles				Interceptions			
Year	Team	GP	GS	Cmb	Solo	Ast	Sck	TFL	FF	FR	Yds	TD	Int	Yds	TD	PD
2023	DET	17	12	95	52	43	2.0	5	—	—	—	—	—	—	—	1
2024	DET	17	17	131	69	62	1.5	5	1	—	—	—	—	—	—	**5**
2025	DET	17	17	**176**	**89**	**87**	**5.0**	**9**	**3**	**2**	2	—	—	—	—	4
2026	DET	7	7	57	29	28	0.0	1	0	1	**12**	—	—	—	—	0
Career		58	53	459	239	220	8.5	20	4	3	14	—	—	—	—	10

=== Postseason ===
Year	Team	Games		Tackles					Fumbles				Interceptions			
Year	Team	GP	GS	Cmb	Solo	Ast	Sck	TFL	FF	FR	Yds	TD	Int	Yds	TD	PD
2023	DET	3	2	**15**	**8**	**7**	0.0	0	0	—	—	—	—	—	—	0
2024	DET	1	1	14	**8**	6	0.0	0	0	—	—	—	—	—	—	0
Career		4	3	29	16	13	0.0	0	0	—	—	—	—	—	—	0

== See also ==
- List of NCAA major college football yearly tackles leaders
