= Chicago Comets =

Chicago Comets were a black all-star American football team that played in 1939 during the period in which the NFL blacklisted black players. Their head coach was Duke Slater.
