= Fred Roberts (American football guard) =

American football player (1907–1982)

No. 50, 15
- Position: Guard

Personal information
- Born: March 18, 1907; Knoxville, Iowa, U.S.
- Died: January 17, 1982 (aged 74); Kansas City, Kansas, U.S.
- Listed height: 6 ft 1 in (1.85 m)
- Listed weight: 200 lb (91 kg)

Career information
- High school: Knoxville (IA)
- College: Iowa

Career history
- Portsmouth Spartans (1930-1932)

Awards and highlights
- Third-team All-American (1929); First-team All-Big Ten (1929)

Fred Everett Roberts (March 18, 1907 – January 17, 1982) was an American football player. He played college football for the University of Iowa where he was a member of Sigma Pi fraternity, vice president of the junior class, and a member of the track team. In 1928 and 1929 he was voted All-Big Ten and in 1929 was voted a United Press All-American. In the National Football League (NFL), he played as a guard for the Portsmouth Spartans from 1930 to 1932. He appeared in 26 NFL games, 16 as a starter.

He moved to Kansas City, Kansas after leaving football in 1935 and became a production manager for a food company. After twenty-five years with the company he left and opened his own liquor store until he retired in 1978. He was the son of Ora Joseph Roberts and Katherine Margaret Edwards Roberts. His wife's name was Gertrude and he had a son named Michael. He was a member of St. Andrew's Episcopal Church, Ducks Unlimited, and the Elks.
