= Joel Hilgenberg =

American football player and coach (born 1962)

No. 61
- Position: Center

Personal information
- Born: July 10, 1962 (age 64); Iowa City, Iowa, U.S.
- Listed height: 6 ft 3 in (1.91 m)
- Listed weight: 250 lb (113 kg)

Career information
- High school: Iowa City
- College: Iowa
- NFL draft: 1984: 4th round, 94th overall pick

Career history

Playing
- New Orleans Saints (1984–1993)

Coaching
- Green Bay Packers (2011) Offensive quality control; Green Bay Packers (2012–2013) Assistant offensive line

Awards and highlights
- Pro Bowl (1992); New Orleans Saints Hall of Fame; Second-team All-American (1983); 2× Second-team All-Big Ten (1982, 1983)

Career NFL statistics
- Games played: 142
- Games started: 97
- Fumble recoveries: 4
- Stats at Pro Football Reference

Joel C. Hilgenberg (born July 10, 1962) is an American former professional football player who was a center in the National Football League (NFL).

Hilgenberg was born in Iowa City, Iowa and played scholastically at Iowa City High School. He played collegiately at Iowa, where he was a two-time All-Big 10 selection, and a second-team All-American as a senior.

Hilgenberg was selected by the New Orleans Saints in the fourth round of the 1984 NFL draft with the 94th overall pick. He spent ten years with the Saints, earning Pro Bowl honors in 1992. Hilgenberg was inducted into the Saints Hall of Fame in 2006, and was selected as one of the greatest 50 players in franchise history in 2016.

He is the son of player and coach Jerry Hilgenberg, brother of former center Jay Hilgenberg, and the nephew of Minnesota Vikings linebacker Wally Hilgenberg; the brothers were teammates on the Saints in 1993.

Hilgenberg was offensive quality control coach for the Green Bay Packers in 2011, and assistant offensive line coach for 2012–13. He resigned his coaching position in April 2014.
