= Ossie Solem =

American football player and coach

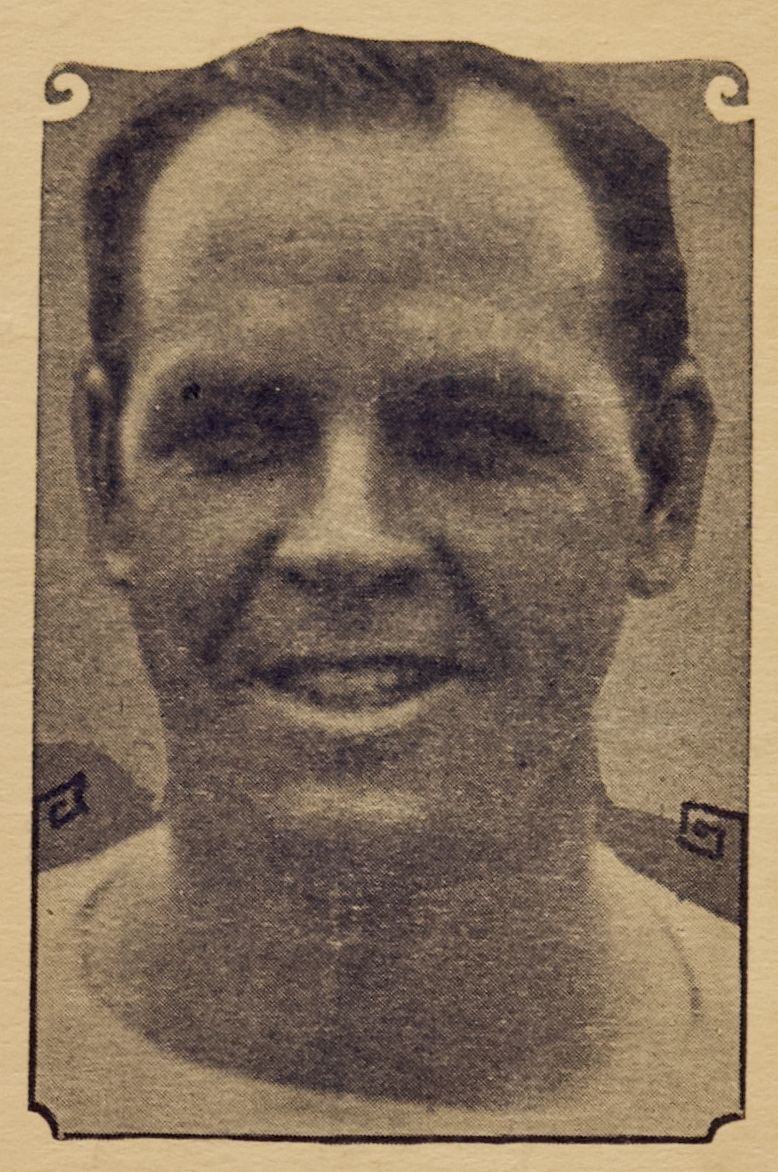
- Solem, c. 1927

Biographical details
- Born: December 13, 1891
- Died: October 26, 1970 (aged 78); Minneapolis, Minnesota, U.S.

Playing career

Football
- 1910–1912: Minnesota
- Position: End

Coaching career (HC unless noted)

Football
- 1913–1920: Minneapolis Marines
- 1920: Luther (IA)
- 1921–1931: Drake
- 1932–1936: Iowa
- 1937–1945: Syracuse
- 1946–1957: Springfield

Basketball
- 1921–1925: Drake

Administrative career (AD unless noted)
- 1925–1932: Drake
- 1934–1937: Iowa

Head coaching record
- Overall: 162–117–20 (college football); 44–7–3 (pro football); 37–31 (basketball)

Accomplishments and honors

Championships
- Football; 5 MVC (1922; 1928–1931)

Oscar Martin "Ossie" Solem (December 13, 1891 – October 26, 1970) was an American football player, coach of football and basketball, and college athletics administrator. He served as the head football coach at Luther College in Decorah, Iowa (1920), Drake University (1921–1931), the University of Iowa (1932–1936), Syracuse University (1937–1945), and Springfield College (1946–1957), compiling a career college football record of 162–117–20. From 1913 until 1920, Solem was the head coach of the Minneapolis Marines, prior to that team's entry into the National Football League (NFL). During his time with the Marines, Solem introduced the team to the single-wing formation, developed by the famed coach, Pop Warner, and used by the University of Minnesota, where Solem had played football. Solem was also the head basketball coach at Drake University for four seasons, from 1921 to 1925, tallying a mark of 37–31.

== Playing and early coaching career ==
Solem played end at the University of Minnesota for Henry L. Williams from 1910 to 1912. He then began his coaching career, coaching for a pre-National Football League (NFL) professional football franchise called the Minneapolis Marines. He coached there for three years from 1913 to 1915 before coaching a few years of high school football at East Des Moines High School and South High School of Minneapolis.

Solem began his college coaching career at Luther College in 1920. After one year there, he was named head coach and athletic director at Drake University in Des Moines, Iowa in 1921. Solem served as Drake's head football coach and athletic director for 11 years from 1921 to 1931. From 1926 to 1931, he also served as the director of the Drake Relays.

== Coaching career at Iowa ==
In 1932, Solem signed a three-year contract to succeed Burt Ingwersen as the 13th head football coach at the University of Iowa. He took over an Iowa football program that had recently been suspended from athletic competition in the Big Ten Conference for a month. More importantly, the Hawkeye program was suffering from the effects of the Great Depression. Since Iowa was a predominantly agricultural state, the Depression hit the Hawkeye athletic program particularly hard. The school could not even afford to pay Solem his full salary when he was first hired.

After winning the opening game of the 1932 season, Iowa lost their final seven games of the year. In the off-season, Solem loudly complained that athletes were being discriminated against in Iowa City and were not being hired for normal student jobs, probably as a result of Iowa's recent conference suspension. An independent investigator substantiated Solem's claims.

Hopes were not high in 1933, but Iowa responded with a 5–3 final record and Hawkeyes quarterback Joe Laws was named the Big Ten MVP. Solem's contract was extended two years, and with the departure of Iowa's athletic director, Solem was appointed to that position as well. Meanwhile, he struggled with a lack of cooperation from fellow Big Ten schools in schedule meetings. Each conference member was supposed to be guaranteed five conference games, but due to Iowa's recent suspension, other Big Ten schools were more accommodating to Notre Dame, a non-conference school, than they were to the Hawkeyes. Solem fought tirelessly to have Iowa regarded as a member of equal standing within the conference.

After two season opening wins, Iowa failed to win any of its final six games in 1934, and a season that started optimistically ended with a 2–5–1 record. Iowa managed to bounce back the following year with a respectable 4–2–2 record in 1935 behind the play of captain Dick Crayne and the sensational Ozzie Simmons. After the 1935 season, Solem worked with the president of the university at the time to improve the job situation for athletes in Iowa City. Their reforms helped Solem bring in what Solem called "the finest group of freshmen during my tenure". Many of the athletes Solem successfully recruited to Iowa would become the foundation for the 1939 Hawkeye team, nicknamed the "Ironmen", which included Nile Kinnick and Erwin Prasse.

A conflict between Solem and Ozzie Simmons overshadowed the 1936 season, which ended in a 3–4–1 record. After a 52–0 loss to Minnesota, Simmons quit the team for a couple days. Simmons stated that he felt Solem had been too critical of him for Iowa's failures during the 1936 season. Simmons was convinced to return to the team a few days later.

Before the final game of the season, reports were heard that Solem was leaving at the end of the year. Iowa defeated a heavily favored, nationally ranked Temple team, coached by Pop Warner, 25–0, to end Solem's coaching career at Iowa. After the 1936 season, Solem announced he was leaving Iowa for Syracuse University.

Later, Solem wrote, "I went down to Iowa City for the Iowa-Minnesota game, the first time I had been on the campus since the year after we left Iowa. As I sat there watching the game and admiring the beauty and growth of the campus, recalling the many friends we had in that lovely town, I could not bring myself to have any feeling of dislike or hate, but rather a feeling of regret...and gratefulness for having once been a part of that great institution."

== Later coaching career ==
Solem coached at Syracuse from 1937 to 1945. During his time at Syracuse, he tutored a young assistant coach named Bud Wilkinson, who went on to coach the Oklahoma Sooners and win three national championships. After his time with the Orange, he coached at Springfield College in Massachusetts from 1946 to 1957, compiling a 58–33–7 record. Solem coached a total of 37 seasons of college football, with a combined record of 162–117–20 at five schools.

== Death and legacy ==
Solem died at a hospital in Minneapolis, Minnesota on October 26, 1970.

One of his former players said about Solem, "He was a better offensive coach than he was a defensive coach...He was a fine, clean living man, and he was very well thought of in athletic circles." Former player Ozzie Simmons remarked, "He probably could have been tougher (on the players), but he was the finest gentleman I've ever been around."

== Head coaching record ==
=== Professional football ===
Year	Team	Overall	Conference	Standing
Minneapolis Marines (Independent) (1913–1920)
1913	Minneapolis Marines	8–1		
1914	Minneapolis Marines	5–1		
1915	Minneapolis Marines	6–1		
1916	Minneapolis Marines	8–0–1		
1917	Minneapolis Marines	7–0		
1918	Minneapolis Marines	No team		
1919	Minneapolis Marines	5–2–1		
1920	Minneapolis Marines	5–2–1		
Minneapolis Marines:		44–7–3		
Total:		44–7–3		

=== College football ===
Year	Team	Overall	Conference	Standing	Bowl/playoffs
Luther Norse (Independent) (1920)
1920	Luther	5–1–1			
Luther:		5–1–1			
Drake Bulldogs (Missouri Valley Conference) (1921–1931)
1921	Drake	5–2	2–2	4th	
1922	Drake	7–0	4–0	T–1st	
1923	Drake	5–2	3–1	2nd	
1924	Drake	5–2–1	3–1	T–2nd	
1925	Drake	5–3	5–2	2nd	
1926	Drake	2–6	1–4	8th	
1927	Drake	3–6	1–2	9th	
1928	Drake	7–1	3–0	1st	
1929	Drake	5–3–1	3–0–1	1st	
1930	Drake	5–4	3–0	T–1st	
1931	Drake	5–6	3–0	1st	
Drake:		54–35–2	31–12–1		
Iowa Hawkeyes (Big Ten Conference) (1932–1936)
1932	Iowa	1–7	0–5	10th	
1933	Iowa	5–3	3–2	T–5th	
1934	Iowa	2–5–1	1–3–1	T–8th	
1935	Iowa	4–2–2	1–2–2	8th	
1936	Iowa	3–4–1	0–4–1	8th	
Iowa:		15–21–4	5–16–4		
Syracuse Orangemen (Independent) (1937–1945)
1937	Syracuse	5–2–1			
1938	Syracuse	5–3			
1939	Syracuse	3–3–2			
1940	Syracuse	3–4–1			
1941	Syracuse	5–2–1			
1942	Syracuse	6–3			
1943	No team—World War II				
1944	Syracuse	2–4–1			
1945	Syracuse	1–6			
Syracuse:		30–27–6			
Springfield Gymnasts/Maroons (Independent) (1946–1957)
1946	Springfield	4–4			
1947	Springfield	4–4			
1948	Springfield	6–1–1			
1949	Springfield	6–2			
1950	Springfield	6–2			
1951	Springfield	3–6			
1952	Springfield	3–2–3			
1953	Springfield	4–3–2			
1954	Springfield	3–5			
1955	Springfield	5–2			
1956	Springfield	8–0–1			
1957	Springfield	6–2			
Springfield:		58–33–7			
Total:		162–117–20			
National championship Conference title Conference division title or championship game berth
