= Jay Hilgenberg =

American football player (born 1959)

No. 63, 62
- Position: Center

Personal information
- Born: March 21, 1959 (age 67); Iowa City, Iowa, U.S.
- Listed height: 6 ft 3 in (1.91 m)
- Listed weight: 250 lb (113 kg)

Career information
- High school: Iowa City
- College: Iowa
- NFL draft: 1981: undrafted

Career history
- Chicago Bears (1981–1991); Cleveland Browns (1992); New Orleans Saints (1993)

Awards and highlights
- Super Bowl champion (XX); 2× First-team All-Pro (1988–1989); 2× Second-team All-Pro (1986, 1990); 7× Pro Bowl (1985–1991); 100 Greatest Bears of All-Time; First-team All-Big Ten (1979); Second-team All-Big Ten (1980)

Career NFL statistics
- Games played: 188
- Games started: 152
- Fumble recoveries: 4
- Stats at Pro Football Reference

Jay Walter Hilgenberg (born March 21, 1959) is an American former professional football player who was a center in the National Football League (NFL). He played for the Chicago Bears, Cleveland Browns and the New Orleans Saints from 1981 to 1993.

He is the son of All-American University of Iowa center Jerry Hilgenberg and nephew of Minnesota Vikings linebacker Wally Hilgenberg. His brother Joel Hilgenberg played center for the New Orleans Saints, and the brothers were teammates in 1993 for the Saints.

== Football career ==
Hilgenberg attended the University of Iowa in the late 1970s. He started in the NFL's Pro Bowl seven times. He was a member of the winning team in Super Bowl XX as a member of the 1985 Chicago Bears as well as their Division Champion teams from 1984 to 1988 and 1990.

He has been a nominee for induction into the Pro Football Hall of Fame. Hilgenberg is currently a game analyst for WBBM-AM Radio in Chicago and the Bears Radio Network.
