= Ozzie Simmons =

American football player (1914–2001)

Iowa Hawkeyes
- Position: Halfback

Personal information
- Born: June 6, 1914; Gainesville, Texas, U.S.
- Died: September 26, 2001 (aged 87)

Career information
- College: Iowa (1934–1936)

Awards and highlights
- First-team All-American (1935); First-team All-Big Ten (1935)

Oze E. "Ozzie" Simmons (June 6, 1914 – September 26, 2001) was an American college football player for the University of Iowa. Nicknamed the "Ebony Eel", Simmons was one of the first black All-American football players in the 1930s.

== Background ==
Born in Gainesville, Texas, Simmons grew up in Texas and was an all-state high school quarterback in a segregated high school league in Fort Worth. College opportunities were limited for black players at the time, but an Iowa alumnus saw Simmons play and suggested that he go to the University of Iowa where blacks had been team members, off and on, since 1895. Simmons had heard of the exploits of black Iowa players like Archie Alexander and Duke Slater, so Ozzie and his older brother, Don, hopped a train to Iowa City.

The Simmons brothers found Iowa football coach Ossie Solem in his office. Solem was initially stunned to have two black players walk unannounced into his office. But Solem asked the Simmons brothers to attend Iowa's practice that afternoon. Iowa was conducting a punting drill, and Ozzie Simmons promptly returned two punts back for touchdowns. After practice, Solem told the brothers, "We'll find you a place to stay."

== College career ==
Ozzie had been poorly educated in their segregated school in Texas, so he spent his freshman year catching up on academics. By his sophomore year in 1934, Ozzie Simmons was ready to shine. In his first game, a 34-0 win over South Dakota, Simmons had a 22-yard scoring run as well as punt returns for 61 and 32 yards.

Ozzie rushed for 166 yards, including a 47-yard touchdown sprint, and he had 138 yards on kick and punt returns in his first Big Ten game, a 20-7 defeat of Northwestern. Ralph Cannon of the Chicago Daily News wrote, "This slithery, rubbery, oozy flyer...can make his legs talk more languages than even Red Grange's could when he was a sophomore...Most of it seems to come naturally to Simmons, as such things must come to the genius of any line." Simmons was nicknamed "the Ebony Eel" after that game and gained national acclaim. But Iowa lost every remaining game in 1934, despite the play of Simmons, who returned an interception 80 yards for a touchdown in a loss to Ohio State. Ozzie was a first team All-Big Ten selection and a second team All-American.

1935 was Simmons' finest year. He scored five touchdowns on runs of 50 or more yards in 1935. Simmons scored Iowa's two touchdowns in a 12-6 upset of Colgate, and his touchdown pass to fellow black Iowa star Homer Harris was Iowa's only points in a loss to Purdue. Simmons' best game in 1935 was against Illinois. Ozzie rushed for 192 yards, intercepted a pass, returned three punts for 33 yards, returned two kicks for 54 more yards and scored a touchdown in a 19-0 upset of Illinois. Simmons led Iowa in rushing in 1935 and was selected as a first team All-American. Ozzie was also a first team All-Big Ten selection, as he led the Hawkeyes to a 4-2-2 record.

Simmons' senior year in 1936 was a disappointment. Though Ozzie led Iowa in both rushing and scoring, the Hawkeyes failed to win a conference game and Simmons failed to make any post-season honor teams. Ozzie even quit the team for a couple days after Iowa suffered their worst loss in 20 years, a 52-0 loss to Minnesota. Simmons felt that Coach Solem had been too critical of him for Iowa's failures, but Simmons was convinced to return to the team. Ozzie's final game was against nationally ranked Temple and their Hall of Fame coach, Pop Warner. Simmons scored on a 74-yard touchdown run to lead Iowa to a 25-0 upset.

Ozzie Simmons graduated with 1,544 career rushing yards, the third most in Iowa history at the time. He scored 14 touchdowns in his career, eight of them on plays of 50 yards or more. Though the Hawkeyes had just a 9-11-4 record in his three injury-plagued years at Iowa, Simmons gave Iowa fans something to cheer about when Iowa football was feeling the ill effects of a brief Big Ten suspension and the Great Depression.

== Floyd of Rosedale ==
Ozzie Simmons is probably best known as the central figure in the story that spawned the Floyd of Rosedale trophy. As a talented black player in the 1930s, Simmons was a target of opposing players, which accounted for many of his numerous injuries. During a run against Northwestern University, he was punched. In another game, a newspaper account says a player "rammed his locked hands into Simmons' face."

Ronald Reagan, then a radio sportscaster in Des Moines and later the 40th President of the United States, said, "The problems were when you played another team that did not have a black. For some reason or another, then they would pick on this one man." Reagan then recounted a game against Illinois when Ozzie was injured twice. Reagan said, "I saw (Iowa players) Dick Crayne and Ted Osmaloski walk over to the Illinois huddle during a timeout, and after the game I found out...they said, 'Do that to (Simmons) once more, and we're going to run you right out of the end of your stadium.'"

But the worst treatment for Ozzie came in the 1934 game against Minnesota. Just 12 years earlier, Iowa State's first black player, Jack Trice, was killed by injuries sustained in a game against the Gophers. In 1934, Simmons was knocked out of the Minnesota game three times due to injuries. Simmons did not play in the second half in a blowout Gopher win. "The Minnesota game was the most blatant attack. They were blatant with their piling on and kneeing me. It was obvious, but the refs didn't call it. Some of our fans wanted to come out on the field," Simmons said in 1989.

The following year, Minnesota was scheduled to play at Iowa. While talking to a reporter, Iowa's governor stated, "If the officials stand for any rough tactics like Minnesota used last year, I'm sure the crowd won't." Minnesota's coach Bernie Bierman requested extra security for his team, and tensions were high. To defuse the situation, Minnesota's governor wagered Iowa's governor a prize hog that the Gophers would win the game.

Minnesota did win a clean, fair game in 1935 that was played without incident. Iowa's governor obtained the pig from Rosedale Farms and named him Floyd after Minnesota's governor. Minnesota's governor had a bronze replica made of "Floyd of Rosedale", and Iowa and Minnesota have played for the trophy every year since 1935.

== Retirement and honors ==
Ozzie Simmons lettered at Iowa from 1934–1936, and his brother Don Simmons lettered as an end in 1935 and 1936. Black players were not allowed in the NFL at the time, and Ozzie Simmons played only two years professionally. Simmons played for the Patterson Panthers of the American Association in 1937 and 1939. He was a second team all-league player in 1937 and a first team all-league player in 1939.

Simmons later became a physical education teacher in the Chicago public school system. He and his wife, Eutopia Morsell, married in 1960 and lived in Chicago, where she was part-owner of a funeral home. Ozzie retired from teaching in 1979 after 38 years, and then worked with his wife. He died in 2001 from complications from Alzheimer's and Parkinson's diseases.

Simmons was inducted into the Bob Douglas Black Sports Hall of Fame in New York in 1984. In 1989, Iowa fans selected an all-time University of Iowa football team during the 100th anniversary celebration of Iowa football, and Ozzie Simmons was selected to the team as a running back.

Simmons never appeared angry that he was a victim of racism. "I never had any serious problems in my lifetime," Simmons said in 1989. "I respect people and they respect me. I find that to be wonderful."
