= Duke Slater =

American football player and judge (1898–1966)

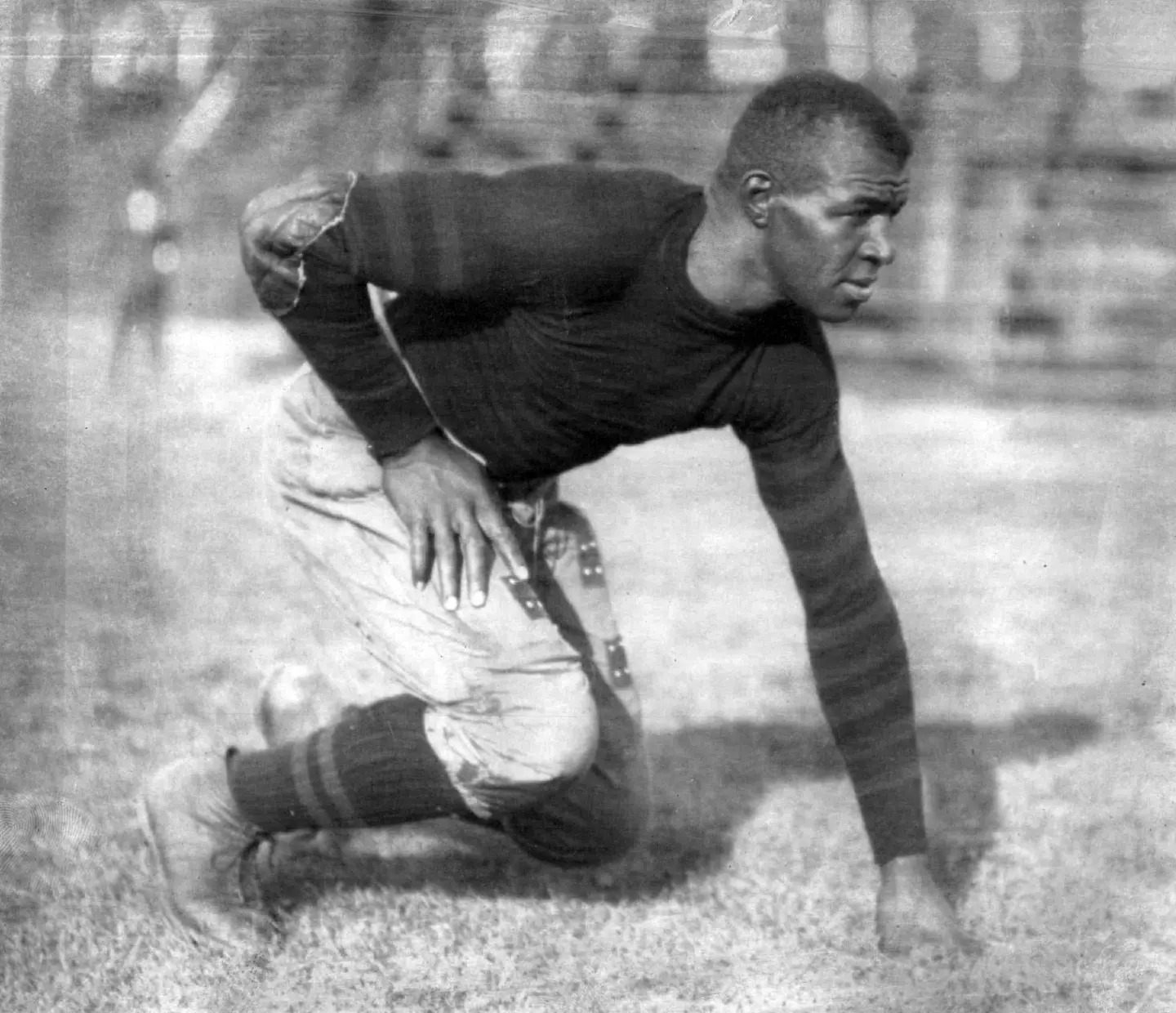
- Slater in his junior year at the University of Iowa

No. 21, 16, 14, 91, 7
- Position: Tackle

Personal information
- Born: December 9, 1898; Normal, Illinois, U.S.
- Died: August 14, 1966 (aged 67); Chicago, Illinois, U.S.
- Listed height: 6 ft 1 in (1.85 m)
- Listed weight: 215 lb (98 kg)

Career information
- High school: Clinton (Clinton, Iowa)
- College: Iowa (1918–1921)

Career history
- Rock Island Independents (1922); Milwaukee Badgers (1922); Rock Island Independents (1923–1926); Chicago Cardinals (1926–1931)

Awards and highlights
- 4× First-team All-Pro (1923, 1925, 1927, 1929); 2× Second-team All-Pro (1924, 1930); National champion (1921); Consensus All-American (1921); Third-team All-American (1919); 3× First-team All-Big Ten (1919–1921)

Career statistics
- Games played: 90
- Games started: 87
- Touchdowns scored: 1
- Stats at Pro Football Reference
- Pro Football Hall of Fame
- College Football Hall of Fame

Frederick Wayman "Duke" Slater (December 9, 1898 – August 14, 1966) was an American professional football player and judge. He was enshrined in the College Football Hall of Fame in 1951 and was named to the Pro Football Hall of Fame's Centennial Class in 2020.

Slater played college football for the Iowa Hawkeyes from 1918 to 1921. Playing the tackle position on the line, he was a first-team All-American in 1921 and a member of the Hawkeyes 1921 national championship team. Slater joined the National Football League (NFL) the following year, becoming the first black lineman in league history. He played ten seasons in the NFL for the Milwaukee Badgers, the Rock Island Independents (Note: The Independents played the 1926 season in the American Football League (AFL)) and the Chicago Cardinals, garnering six all-pro selections.

Slater earned his law degree in 1928 and began to practice law as a Chicago attorney. In 1948, he was elected to the Cook County Municipal Court, becoming just the second black judge in Chicago history. Slater served as a Chicago judge for nearly two decades until his death in 1966.

== Early life ==
Fred Slater was born in Illinois in 1898, the son of George Slater, a Methodist minister. As a boy, Fred somehow picked up the name of the family dog, Duke, as a personal nickname, and he would carry it with him all his life. When Duke Slater was 13 years old, he moved to Clinton, Iowa, after George became pastor of the A.M.E. church there.

Fearing injury, George Slater initially forbade Duke from trying out for football at Clinton High School, believing it to be a sport played by "roughnecks." A brokenhearted Duke went on a hunger strike for several days, and George finally acquiesced on the condition that Duke must be careful to avoid injury. As a result, Slater always took care not to complain or show signs of his football injuries.

Every high school player needed to provide their own shoes and helmet. George could not afford both, so he asked Duke to choose. Slater decided he needed shoes more, and he played every game at Clinton High School without a helmet. Meanwhile, Slater's feet were so big that his shoes had to be special ordered from Chicago.

Duke Slater played three seasons of football for Clinton High School from 1913 to 1915. Clinton claimed two Iowa state championships in 1913 and 1914, and the school compiled a 22-3-1 record in Duke's three years there. Despite playing primarily at tackle, Slater led Clinton in scoring as a senior in 1915, rushing for six touchdowns from the fullback position.

== College career ==
When Slater arrived at Iowa in 1918, eligibility rules had been suspended due to World War I. Therefore, Slater was able to play football as a freshman and earned four letters for the Hawkeye football team from 1918 to 1921. The Hawkeyes compiled a record of 23–6–1 during Slater's four years in uniform.

Iowa finished with a 5–2 record in 1919, losing their two games by a combined five points. As a sophomore, Slater earned unanimous first-team All-Big Ten honors. He was also chosen as a second team All-American in 1919, becoming just the sixth black player ever to earn All-American honors in college football.

In Slater's senior year in 1921, Iowa claimed a share of the 1921 national championship, posting a perfect 7–0 record and never trailing at any point during the season. The 1921 Hawkeyes captured the school's first Big Ten title in 21 years and won the first outright Big Ten crown in school history.

That season, Iowa upset Notre Dame, 10–7, handing them their first defeat in three years. A photo taken during the game by university photographer F. W. Kent showed a helmetless Slater clearing a hole for teammate Gordon Locke by blocking three Notre Dame defenders.

Notre Dame head coach Knute Rockne later said, "This fellow Slater just about beat my team single-handed in the only contest we lost. Realizing the great strength of Slater and the fact that he knew how to use that strength to intelligent advantage, I had four of my players massed around Slater throughout the game. Occasionally my boys would stop the big tackle, but those times were the exception. Usually, he made such holes in my strong line that fullback Locke would go through for long gains, often standing straight up as he advanced with the ball."

Sportswriter Walter Eckersall said, "Slater is so powerful that one man cannot handle him and opposing elevens have found it necessary to send two men against him every time a play was sent off his side of the line." Fritz Crisler, later a head football coach and athletic director at Michigan, said, "Duke Slater was the best tackle I ever played against. I tried to block him throughout my college career but never once did I impede his progress to the ball carrier."

Slater was named first-team All-Big Ten for the third straight year in 1921. He was also named an All-American for the second time, earning first team All-American honors in 1921 from multiple selectors. Duke Slater was just the third black player to earn All-American honors in two different seasons, following William Henry Lewis and Bobby Marshall.

Slater also earned three varsity letters for the Hawkeye track team, participating in field events. Slater placed third in the hammer throw and fourth in the discus throw while helping Iowa to a third-place finish at the inaugural 1921 NCAA Track and Field Championships.

== Professional career ==
=== Rock Island Independents (first stint) ===
Duke Slater joined the NFL's Rock Island Independents in 1922, becoming the first black lineman in NFL history. He made his NFL debut on October 1, 1922, helping the Independents to a 19–14 victory over the Green Bay Packers by swatting down a pass from Packers quarterback Curly Lambeau on Green Bay's final drive of the game.

=== Milwaukee Badgers ===
After Rock Island completed their 1922 season schedule, Slater joined Fritz Pollard and Paul Robeson on the Milwaukee Badgers for two games at the end of the 1922 season.

=== Rock Island Independents (second stint) ===
In 1923, he returned to Rock Island and played his next four seasons – five in all – with the Independents.

Bolstered by an aging Jim Thorpe, the 1924 Independents surged to the top of the NFL standings a month into the season. The Independents suffered their first loss of the year when the previously winless Kansas City Blues upset them, 23–7. Slater was held out of the game because the NFL had a "gentlemen's agreement" prohibiting black players from participating in games held in Missouri; it was the only contest Slater missed in his ten-year NFL career.

Three weeks later, the Blues and Independents met again in Rock Island. Because the game was held in Illinois, Slater was free to play, and with Slater in the lineup, the Independents won the rematch in a shutout, 17–0. But the earlier loss to Kansas City proved costly when Rock Island finished the year with two defeats, one more than the NFL champion Cleveland Bulldogs.

In 1926, the Rock Island Independents left the NFL to play in the rival American Football League (AFL). Slater played one season with Rock Island in the AFL before the league's dissolution.

Duke Slater was a three-time all-NFL selection with Rock Island from 1923 to 1925. He was also named first-team all-pro by the Chicago Tribune in 1926, which chose their all-pro team with players from both the NFL and AFL. In Slater's five seasons with the Rock Island Independents, he played all sixty minutes of every game in which he appeared.

=== Chicago Cardinals ===
Duke Slater signed a contract with the NFL's Chicago Cardinals near the end of the 1926 season and appeared in their final two games that season. By signing with the Chicago (now Arizona) Cardinals in 1926, Slater became the first black player to play for a current NFL franchise.

At Slater's urging, the Chicago Cardinals brought in Harold Bradley Sr. to play guard alongside him in 1928, making Bradley the second black lineman in NFL history. However, Bradley's NFL career lasted just two games. With the exception of those two games by Bradley, Duke Slater was the only black player in the NFL from 1927 to 1929.

Slater's streak of five straight all-pro appearances was broken in 1928, when the Cardinals played just a six-game schedule; after the season, Cardinals owner Chris O'Brien sold the team to Chicago physician Dr. David Jones. Jones purged the Cardinals roster in 1929, bringing back just four players from the previous season, but Slater – once again the only black player in the NFL – was one of four Cardinals to return.

Star fullback Ernie Nevers joined the Cardinals in 1929. On November 28, 1929, Nevers set an NFL record by scoring all 40 points in the Cardinals' 40–6 win over their intra-city rivals, the Chicago Bears. Nevers' mark of 40 points in a single game is the oldest untied individual record in the NFL's record books, having stood since 1929.

Duke Slater played all sixty minutes in that game, the only Cardinal lineman to do so. The Chicago Herald-Examiner reported, "Duke Slater, the veteran colored tackle, seemed the dominant figure in that forward wall which had the Bear front wobbly. It was Slater who opened the holes for Nevers when a touchdown was in the making."

Bears head coach and owner George Halas later said, "I can't say too much about Duke Slater as a football player and as a gentleman. In the old Cardinal-Bears games, I learned it was absolutely useless to run against Slater's side of the Cardinal line. They talked about Fordham's famous Seven Blocks of Granite in the mid-1930s and what a line that was. Well, Slater was a One Man Line a decade before that. Seven Blocks of Granite? He was the Rock of Gibraltar."

In 1927 and 1929, Duke Slater was the only black player in the NFL, yet he was an all-pro selection both seasons. He was named all-pro for the seventh and final time in 1930, becoming the first NFL lineman to make all-pro teams in seven seasons. Slater retired after the 1931 season, and his ten NFL seasons ranked third in league history at the time of his retirement.

Duke Slater played more seasons (10), played in more games (99), started more games (96), and had more all-pro selections (six) than any other black player in the NFL from 1920 to 1945. Second in all of those categories was Fritz Pollard, who was elected to the Pro Football Hall of Fame in 2005.

== Coaching career ==
Two years after Duke Slater retired, the NFL enacted an unofficial color ban; no blacks appeared in the NFL from 1934 to 1945. Slater helped give black football players a place to play by assembling and coaching several all-star teams of black players. Slater served as head coach of the Chicago Negro All-Stars (1933), the Chicago Brown Bombers (1937), the Chicago Comets (1939), and the Chicago Panthers (1940). Slater also served as an assistant coach for the Chicago Negro All-Stars in a 1938 exhibition against the Chicago Bears.

== Law career and years after football ==
While playing in the NFL, Duke Slater returned to Iowa in the off-seasons to attend law school. Slater earned his law degree from the University of Iowa's College of Law in 1928. He then practiced law in Chicago while playing for the Cardinals. After one year as a high school coach and athletic director in Oklahoma City, Slater returned to Chicago in 1933 as an attorney.

In 1948, he was elected to the Cook County Municipal Court after receiving nearly one million votes. Duke Slater was the second black judge in Chicago history, following Wendell E. Green, who was elected in 1942.

Slater served two six-year terms on the Municipal Court. In 1960, he was the first black individual elevated to the Cook County Superior Court, the highest court in Chicago at the time. Four years later, Slater moved to the Circuit Court of Cook County following that institution's formation.

Duke Slater was an active booster and recruiter for the University of Iowa throughout his life. He recruited dozens of prominent black athletes to Iowa City, including Ozzie Simmons, Jim Walker, Emlen Tunnell, Earl Banks, Harold Bradley Jr., Nolden Gentry, Carl Cain, wrestler Simon Roberts, and many others.

== Personal life and death ==
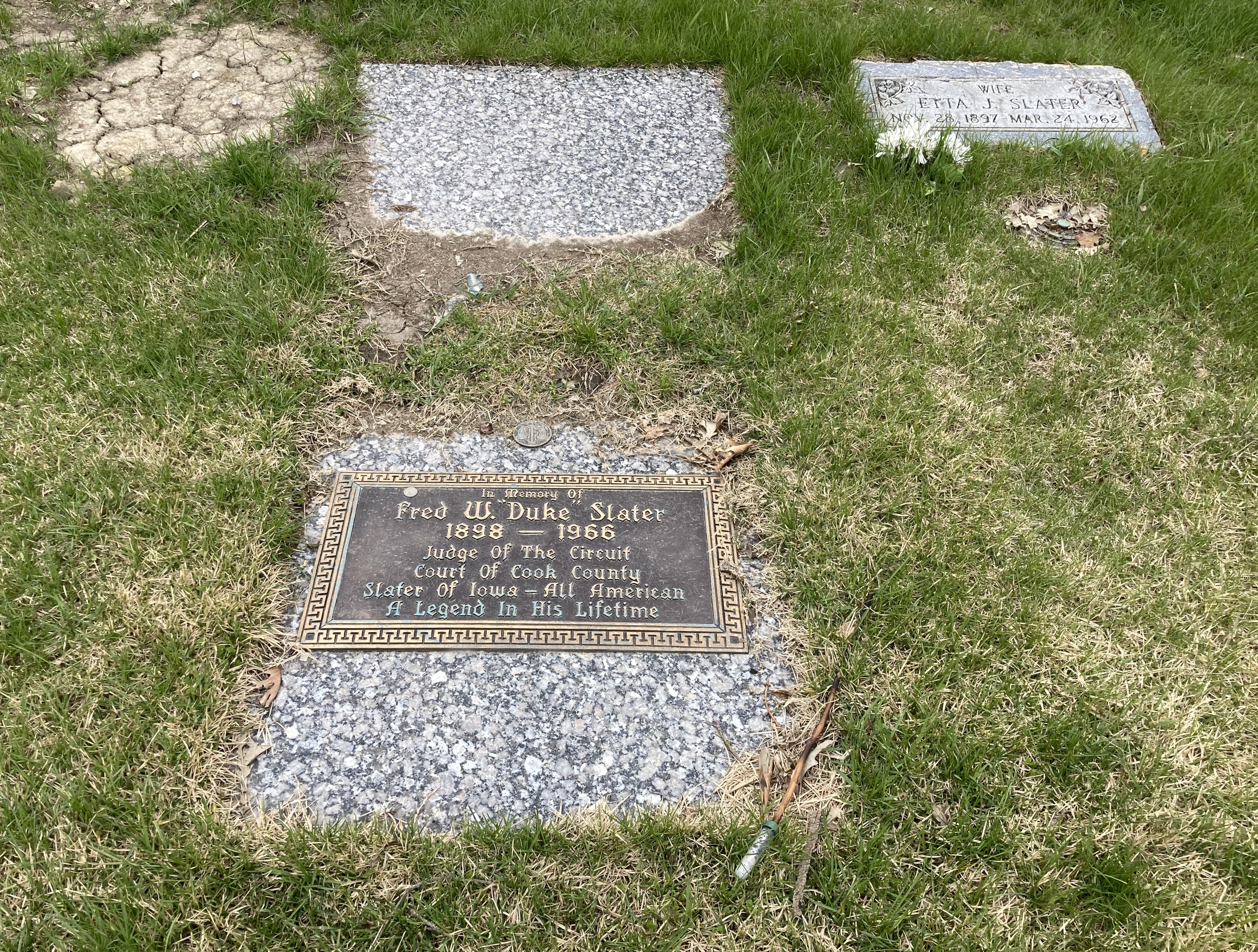
Slater's grave at Mount Glenwood Memory Gardens South

Slater married Etta Searcy in 1926, and they remained married until her death in 1962; they had no children. Duke Slater died in 1966 at age 67 of stomach cancer, and was buried in Mount Glenwood Memory Gardens South near Chicago.

== Honors ==
For his playing career at Clinton High School, Duke Slater was elected to the Iowa High School Football Hall of Fame in 1980.

Slater was one of just five football players inducted into the Iowa Sports Hall of Fame in the Hall's inaugural year in 1951, joining Nile Kinnick, Aubrey Devine, Jay Berwanger, and Elmer Layden.

In 1946, Slater was one of 11 players selected to an all-time college football All-American team by a nationwide poll of 600 sportswriters and coaches. The Football Writers Association of America chose Duke Slater in 1969 as one of 44 players on an all-century team covering the first 100 years of college football.

When the College Football Hall of Fame opened in 1951, Duke Slater was the only black player elected in the Hall's inaugural class. He was one of two Hawkeye players inducted that year, along with Nile Kinnick.

In 1972, University of Iowa president Willard Boyd proposed renaming Iowa Stadium "Kinnick-Slater Stadium" after Nile Kinnick and Duke Slater, but the university decided to name it after Kinnick alone. Instead, the university named the residence hall closest to the stadium Slater Hall in his honor.

Hawkeye fans voted for an all-time University of Iowa football team during the 100th anniversary celebration of Iowa football in 1989, and Slater was selected as a tackle.

In 2013, the University of Iowa placed Duke Slater's name and jersey number (#15) on the Kinnick Stadium Wall of Honor. Slater was one of nine Hawkeyes recognized on the Wall of Honor.

In 2019, the University of Iowa unveiled a sculpture of Duke Slater on the north end of Kinnick Stadium. The relief depicts Slater's famous block against Notre Dame in 1921, captured in the photograph by Kent. A plaque next to the relief reads, "Slater drives the opposition back in calm determination. His life in football and beyond was defined by triumph and relentless breaking of boundaries."

An apartment complex in Chicago, Judge Slater Apartments, is named in his honor.

The Professional Football Researchers Association (PFRA) elected Duke Slater to their second Hall of Very Good class in 2004. Slater was also one of four players the PFRA officially endorsed for election to the Pro Football Hall of Fame, along with LaVern Dilweg, Mac Speedie, and Al Wistert.

Before the Pro Football Hall of Fame opened in 1963, Duke Slater was mentioned by United Press International as one of nine candidates that had been nominated for election to the new Hall. Duke was also listed as one of six "strong candidates" for election to the Pro Football Hall of Fame by the Associated Press in 1964.

Slater was a finalist for the Professional Football Hall of Fame in 1970 and 1971, the first two years finalists were publicly announced by the organization. In 1972, the Hall created a Seniors Committee, which would provide the exclusive nominations for players who retired over 25 years ago. From 1972 to 2019, the Seniors Committee declined to nominate Slater as a finalist for the Pro Football Hall of Fame.

On January 15, 2020, Duke Slater was elected to the Pro Football Hall of Fame as a member of the Centennial Class.

In July 2021 it was announced that the field of Kinnick Stadium would be named Slater Field in his honor.

== See also ==
- List of African-American jurists
