= Brad Quast =

American football player (born 1968)

Profile
- Position: Linebacker

Personal information
- Born: June 5, 1968 (age 58); Arlington Heights, Illinois, U.S.
- Listed height: 6 ft 1 in (1.85 m)
- Listed weight: 245 lb (111 kg)

Career information
- High school: Arlington Heights (IL) Forest View
- College: Iowa
- NFL draft: 1990: 10th round, 251st overall pick

Career history
- New York Jets (1990)*; Barcelona Dragons (1991); Philadelphia Eagles (1992)
- * Offseason or practice squad member only

Awards and highlights
- 2× First-team All-Big Ten (1988, 1989)

Brad Quast (born June 5, 1968) was an all-conference football player for the University of Iowa from 1986 to 1989. He is a member of the University of Iowa's all-time football team.

== Iowa career ==
Brad Quast went to Forest View High School in Arlington Heights, Illinois, before attending the University of Iowa. He was heavily recruited and selected the Hawkeyes over Michigan. Quast was a linebacker for Iowa for four years from 1986-1989, and he was one of the few linebackers in school history to start for four years. He was named the top freshman linebacker in the nation by The Sporting News in 1986.

In his junior season in 1988, Quast was an all-Big Ten selection. He recorded 20 tackles against Iowa State, and then he duplicated the feat later in the year against Colorado. Quast finished the year with 133 tackles, which ranked eighth in school history. He also led the team with four interceptions, including one against Kansas State that he returned 94 yards for a touchdown, setting a school record.

In his senior season, Quast was named a team captain of the 1989 Hawkeyes. He was an all-Big Ten selection for the second time, as he again led the team with four interceptions. His 11 career interceptions ranked fourth in school history. Quast also had 114 tackles, raising his career total to 435, which ranked third in school history.

== Professional career and honors ==
Quast was the New York Jets' tenth round pick in 1990 but was released without playing a game. He played two seasons with Barcelona in the World League before signing a two-year contract with the Philadelphia Eagles. But Quast tore up his knee in a 1992 preseason game and never played again. By 1993, he could no longer pass a physical exam.

In 1989, Iowa fans selected an all-time University of Iowa football team during the 100th anniversary celebration of Iowa football, and Brad Quast was an honorable mention selection as a linebacker.
