= Al Couppee =

American football player (1920–1998)

No. 20
- Positions: Running back, guard

Personal information
- Born: June 4, 1920; Council Bluffs, Iowa, U.S.
- Died: July 3, 1998 (aged 78); Laguna Hills, California, U.S.
- Listed height: 6 ft 0 in (1.83 m)
- Listed weight: 225 lb (102 kg)

Career information
- High school: Thomas Jefferson (Council Bluffs)
- College: Iowa (1938–1941)
- NFL draft: 1942: 22nd round, 196th overall pick

Career history
- Washington Redskins (1946)

Career NFL statistics
- Rushing yards: 22
- Rushing average: 7.3
- Stats at Pro Football Reference

Albert Wallace Couppee (June 4, 1920 – July 3, 1998) was an American professional football running back in the National Football League (NFL) for the Washington Redskins. He played college football at the University of Iowa and was selected 196th overall in the 22nd round of the 1942 NFL draft.
