= Larry Station =

American football player (born 1963)

No. 90
- Position: Linebacker

Personal information
- Born: December 5, 1963 (age 62); Omaha, Nebraska, U.S.
- Listed height: 5 ft 11 in (1.80 m)
- Listed weight: 227 lb (103 kg)

Career information
- High school: Omaha Central
- College: Iowa; Washington University in St. Louis
- NFL draft: 1986: 11th round, 287th overall pick

Career history
- Pittsburgh Steelers (1986)

Awards and highlights
- Unanimous All-American (1985); Consensus All-American (1984); First-team All-American (1983); 3× First-team All-Big Ten (1983, 1984, 1985); Second-team All-Big Ten (1982)
- Stats at Pro Football Reference
- College Football Hall of Fame

Larry W. Station Jr. (born December 5, 1963) is an American former professional football player who was a linebacker for the Pittsburgh Steelers of the National Football League (NFL). He played college football at the University of Iowa. He is Iowa's leader in career tackles and was twice named as a consensus first-team All-American. Station was inducted into the College Football Hall of Fame in 2009.

== Early life ==
Station was born and raised in Omaha, Nebraska, just across the river from Iowa. Station attended Omaha Central High School., where he received three varsity letters, in football, track, and tennis. He was a two-time first-team all-state football selection in high school and was named captain of his football team.

Station was twice named the captain of his high school track team, for which he competed in shot put and discus throw. He won the Nebraska state title in the shot put his junior and senior years and won the state title in discus his senior year. In Station's senior year in 1982, he led his high school to the state championship at the Nebraska state high school track meet. In that meet, he won the state title in the shot put by setting a state meet record which stood for 17 years.

In addition to being all-city and all-conference in both football and track, Station was a top tennis player in high school. At age 14, he was ranked third in singles and first in doubles in the state of Nebraska. Station was the Nebraska state juniors tennis champion while in high school. He was so adept at tennis that Iowa coach Hayden Fry offered to let him play on the Hawkeye tennis team, an offer Station declined.

== College career ==
Station only started five football games at the University of Iowa in 1982 as a true freshman, yet he led the team with 88 tackles. He was Iowa's defensive player of the game against Michigan and he had 15 tackles against Indiana on homecoming. He helped Iowa lead the Big Ten in both rushing defense and total defense in 1982, and Station was a second-team All-Big Ten Conference selection.

As a sophomore in 1983, Larry Station led Iowa in tackles in seven games. He was Iowa's defensive player of the game against Purdue and Illinois and led Iowa with 138 tackles on the year. Station helped lead Iowa to a 9–3 record and a berth in the Gator Bowl. Station was selected as a consensus first-team All-Big Ten linebacker and was a second-team All-American.

In 1984, Station again led Iowa in tackles with 137 and recovered fumbles in three Big Ten games. He had 21 tackles against Minnesota and three sacks against Northwestern. He was selected as first-team All-Big Ten for the second time and was a consensus first team All-American in 1984. Station was also Iowa's fourth academic All-American.

In Station's senior season in 1985, he helped lead Iowa to its first outright Big Ten title in 27 years. He led Iowa in tackles for the fourth straight season with 129. He was selected as a co-captain and the co-MVP of the 1985 Hawkeyes. Station was a finalist for the Lombardi Award and the Butkus Award, and he was twice selected as Iowa's defensive player of the game in 1985. He was selected as a first-team All-Big Ten player for the third consecutive year, and for the second consecutive year, Larry Station was a consensus first-team All-American. He was also chosen as an Academic All-American for the second straight year and won Iowa's Scholastic Achievement Award.

Station had 492 career tackles, the most in Hawkeye history, but he is best remembered for one: his game-saving tackle of running back Jamie Morris in Iowa's 1985 game against Michigan. The game was one of the most anticipated in school history, as Iowa was ranked #1 in the Associated Press poll, while Michigan was ranked #2. Michigan held a 10–9 lead with just minutes left on the clock at Kinnick Stadium, when the Wolverines faced third down and two yards for a first down. Station anticipated the handoff to Morris and reacted with lightning speed, dropping Morris for a two-yard loss. The Wolverines were forced to punt, and Iowa kicker Rob Houghtlin kicked a game-winning field goal as time expired to give Iowa a cherished 12–10 victory.

== Retirement ==
In his final game at Iowa, Station injured his back and was forced to leave early in the 1986 Rose Bowl against UCLA. Station never fully recovered from that injury, and he played just one year of professional football with the Pittsburgh Steelers, who drafted Station in the 11th round of the 1986 NFL Draft, before being forced into retirement from football.

Station then obtained a master's degree in business administration from the Olin Business School at Washington University in St. Louis. He returned to Omaha, where he bought his family's grocery store, Bedford Market, and a number of rental properties he oversees. Station lives in Omaha three of children.

== Honors ==
Not only does Station hold the record for career tackles at Iowa, he is the only player to have led the Hawkeyes in tackles in four seasons. Iowa went 35–13–1 during his four years there, and he helped lead the Hawkeyes to four bowl games. Station is only the second Iowa player to twice be named a consensus first team All-American (Cal Jones is the other). Station was inducted into the Iowa Sports Hall of Fame in 2000. He was elected to the College Football Hall of Fame in 2009.

In 1989, Iowa fans selected an all-time Iowa football team during the 100th anniversary celebration of Iowa football, and Station was selected to the team as a linebacker. In 1999, Sports Illustrated selected Larry Station as the 38th greatest sports figure in history from the state of Nebraska.
