= Marv Cook =

American football player (born 1966)

No. 46, 85, 86, 47
- Position: Tight end

Personal information
- Born: February 24, 1966 (age 60); West Branch, Iowa, U.S.
- Listed height: 6 ft 4 in (1.93 m)
- Listed weight: 234 lb (106 kg)

Career information
- High school: West Branch
- College: Iowa
- NFL draft: 1989: 3rd round, 63rd overall pick

Career history
- New England Patriots (1989–1993); Chicago Bears (1994); St. Louis Rams (1995)

Awards and highlights
- First-team All-Pro (1991); 2× Pro Bowl (1991, 1992); Consensus All-American (1988); 2× First-team All-Big Ten (1987, 1988)

Career NFL statistics
- Receptions: 257
- Receiving yards: 2,190
- Touchdowns: 13
- Stats at Pro Football Reference

Marvin Eugene Cook (born February 24, 1966) is an American former professional football player who was a tight end in the National Football League (NFL). He was selected by the New England Patriots in the third round of the 1989 NFL draft. A 6'4", 234-lb. tight end from the University of Iowa, Cook played in seven NFL seasons from 1989 to 1995 for the Patriots, the Chicago Bears, and the St. Louis Rams. He was a two-time Pro Bowl selection in 1991 and 1992.

In 1991, Cook was fourth in NFL receptions with 83. His 210 receptions as a Patriot put him 3rd in team history for tight ends behind Rob Gronkowski and Ben Coates.

== NFL career statistics ==
Legend
**Bold**	Career high

Year	Team	Games		Receiving				
Year	Team	GP	GS	Rec	Yds	Avg	Lng	TD
1989	NWE	16	0	3	13	4.3	5	0
1990	NWE	16	16	51	455	8.9	35	**5**
1991	NWE	16	16	**82**	**808**	9.9	**49**	3
1992	NWE	16	15	52	413	7.9	27	2
1993	NWE	16	12	22	154	7.0	17	1
1994	CHI	16	8	21	212	**10.1**	34	1
1995	STL	16	9	26	135	5.2	16	1
Career		112	76	257	2,190	8.5	49	13

== Coaching ==
From 2007 to 2021, Cook was the head football coach at Regina High School in Iowa City, where he won seven straight state titles between 2010 and 2016, as well as a state record 56 game winning streak from 2010 to 2013.

In 2010, one of Regina's 14 wins was against Class 3A's #1 Ranked team, the Solon Spartans, of the WaMaC Conference, ending Solon's 44 game winning streak.

Regina is the conference rival of Cook's own high school, in West Branch, where his football jersey is retired and in the halls at West Branch High School.

Cook announced in May 2021 that he would be resigning as Regina's head coach, his youngest son having graduated from Regina earlier that month. Cook did not specify future plans.
