= Zud Schammel =

American football player (1910–1973)

No. 37
- Position: Guard

Personal information
- Born: August 26, 1910; Waterloo, Iowa, U.S.
- Died: January 11, 1973 (aged 62); Phoenix, Arizona, U.S.
- Listed height: 6 ft 2 in (1.88 m)
- Listed weight: 235 lb (107 kg)

Career information
- High school: Lincoln East (Lincoln, Nebraska)
- College: Iowa

Career history
- Green Bay Packers (1937)

Awards and highlights
- First-team All-American (1933); First-team All-Big Ten (1933)

Career statistics
- Games played: 8
- Games started: 3
- Touchdowns: 1
- Stats at Pro Football Reference

Francis William "Zud" Schammel (August 26, 1910 – January 11, 1973) was an American professional football player who was a guard in the National Football League (NFL) with the Green Bay Packers. He played college football for the Iowa Hawkeyes, where he was named an All-American. After his brief football career, Schammel went on to own a construction company in Phoenix, Arizona.

== Early life and college ==
Zud Schammel was born on August 26, 1908, in Waterloo, Iowa. Schammel graduated from Lincoln East High School in Lincoln, Nebraska, before briefly attending Teacher's College at Cedar Falls and then transferring to the University of Iowa. While at Iowa, he played guard for the Hawkeyes college football team. In the first game of the 1933 season, he suffered a leg injury that led to an infection. The infection required almost constant treatment, requiring Schammel to go to the university hospital for three or four days a week. Despite his injury, he was named to the All-America team. In 1933, he played in the College All-Star game against the Chicago Bears and in 1934 he played in the East-West Shrine Game.

== Professional career ==
After graduating college, Schammel coached for the Hawkeyes for three years. In 1937, he was signed by head coach Curly Lambeau to played for the Green Bay Packers during the 1937 NFL season. During his only season with the Packers and in the NFL, Schammel played in eight games, starting three of them and scoring one touchdown. In October of that season, the Packers traded Schammel to the Brooklyn Dodgers for Bill Lee. A few weeks later, the Dodgers requested that Schammel take his place with the team, but Schammel produced his contract with the Packers that had a no-trade clause. He was ultimately returned to the Packers, who instead provided the Dodgers with Ave Daniell as trade compensation. Schammel sent a letter to Lambeau prior to the 1938 NFL season informing him that his superiors for his job in Chicago would not allow him three months leave to play for the Packers that season.

== Personal life ==
Schammel moved to Phoenix, Arizona, in 1946. After his football career, he owned a construction company and was a member of the Arizona General Contractors and the Arizona Building and Contractors Association. He was active in the community, founding and serving as the executive secretary of the Sun Angel Foundation at Arizona State University. He also a member of other local Phoenix organizations and was a supporter of the Phoenix Boys Club. In 1954, Schammel was made an honorary member of the Navajo Nation and given the title "Chief Big Man". Schammel was married and had two children; he died on January 11, 1973, at the age of 62.
