= Homer Harris =

American football player and coach (1916–2007)

Homer E. Harris, Jr.
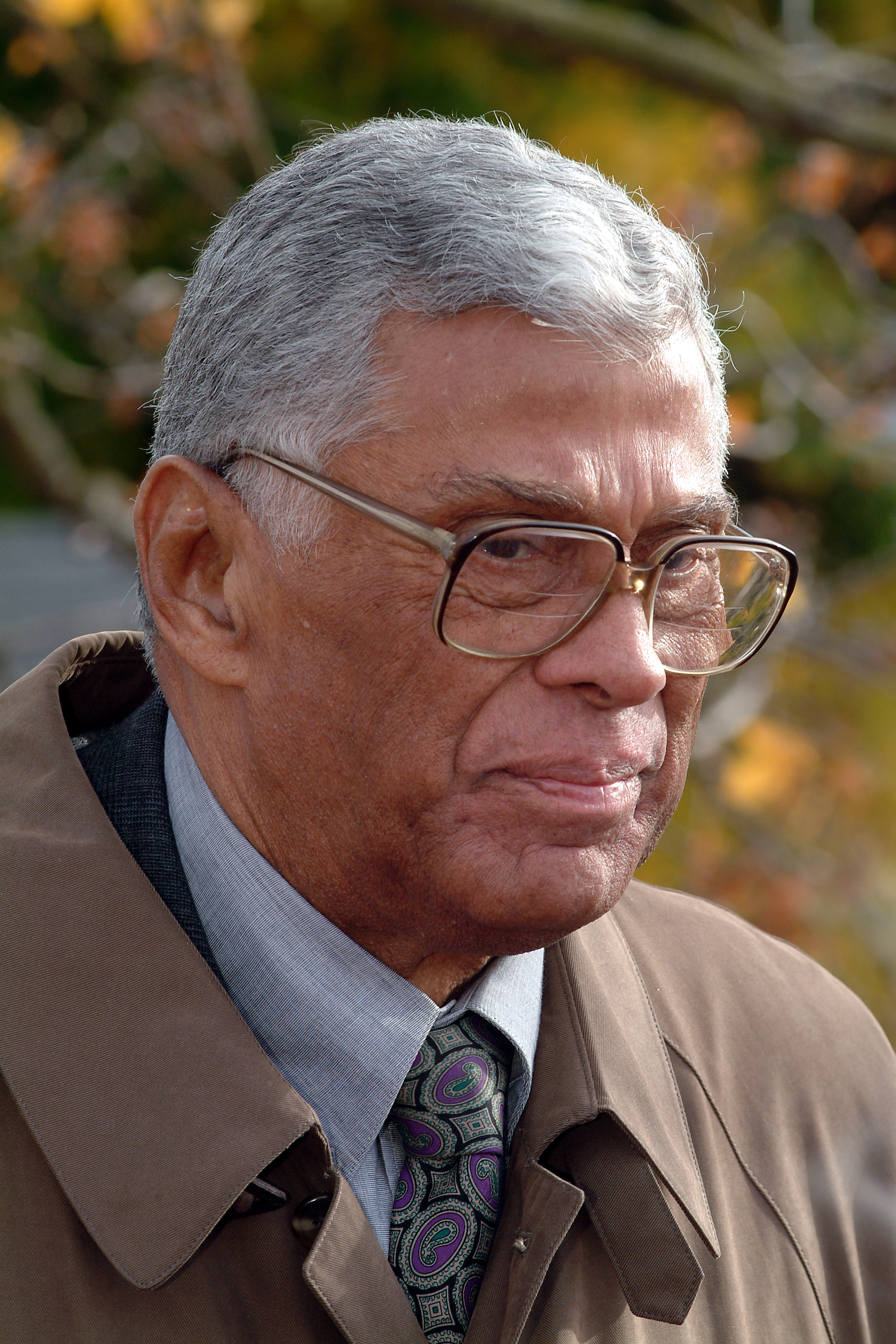
- Harris, 2002, at the dedication of the Seattle park named after him

Biographical details
- Born: March 4, 1916; Seattle, Washington, U.S.
- Died: March 17, 2007 (aged 91); Seattle, Washington, U.S.

Playing career
- 1935–1937: Iowa
- Positions: End, tackle

Coaching career (HC unless noted)
- 1939–1940: North Carolina A&T

Head coaching record
- Overall: 8–7–3

Accomplishments and honors

Awards
- Second-team All-Big Ten (1936)

Homer E. Harris Jr. (March 4, 1916 – March 17, 2007) was an American college football player and coach. He attended the University of Iowa, where he played as an end and tackle and became the first African-American captain of a Big Ten Conference team. Harris served as head football coach at North Carolina A&T State University in Greensboro, North Carolina from 1939 to 1940, compiling a record of 8–7–3.

Born in Seattle, he became the first black captain of the football team at Seattle's Garfield High School. At Iowa, he was the MVP of the 1936 Iowa Hawkeyes football team as a junior and captain of the 1937 Iowa Hawkeyes football team as senior. named an All-Big Ten Conference three years in a row.

Harris went to Meharry Medical College in Nashville and practiced as a dermatologist, first in Chicago and then his hometown of Seattle from 1954 to 2000. He was inducted into the Hawkeyes' Hall of Fame in 2002 and had a Seattle park named after him the same year. Harris died on March 17, 2007, at his home in the Queen Anne neighborhood of Seattle, after suffering from Alzheimer’s disease.

== Head coaching record ==
Year	Team	Overall	Conference	Standing	Bowl/playoffs
North Carolina A&T Aggies (Colored Intercollegiate Athletic Association) (1939–1940)
1939	North Carolina A&T	4–3–2	3–2–2	5th	
1940	North Carolina A&T	4–4–1	3–3–1	5th	
North Carolina A&T:		8–7–3	6–5–3		
Total:		8–7–3			
