= Wally Hilgenberg =

American football player (1942–2008)

No. 67, 58
- Positions: Linebacker, Guard

Personal information
- Born: September 19, 1942; Marshalltown, Iowa, U.S.
- Died: September 23, 2008 (aged 66); Lakeville, Minnesota, U.S.
- Listed height: 6 ft 3 in (1.91 m)
- Listed weight: 229 lb (104 kg)

Career information
- High school: Wilton (Wilton, Iowa)
- College: Iowa
- NFL draft: 1964: 4th round, 48th overall pick
- AFL draft: 1964: 8th round, 57th overall pick

Career history
- Detroit Lions (1964–1967); Minnesota Vikings (1968–1979)

Awards and highlights
- NFL champion (1969); 50 Greatest Vikings; First-team All-Big Ten (1963)

Career NFL statistics
- Sacks: 7.5
- Safeties: 1
- Interceptions: 8
- Fumble recoveries: 14
- Total touchdowns: 2
- Stats at Pro Football Reference

Walter William Hilgenberg (September 19, 1942 – September 23, 2008) was a professional American football linebacker, he played 16 seasons in the National Football League (NFL), four with the Detroit Lions and 12 with the Minnesota Vikings.

== Early life ==
Born in Marshalltown, Iowa, Hilgenberg's family moved to Wilton (then known as Wilton Junction) where he grew up and graduated from Wilton High School. He played college football in the Big Ten Conference at the University of Iowa in Iowa City, where he starred on both sides of the line of scrimmage, as a linebacker and as a guard. Two of his nephews, Jay and Joel would play on the offensive line at center in the NFL during the 1980s and 1990s.

== Professional career ==
Hilgenberg was selected in the fourth round of the 1964 NFL draft (48th overall) by the Lions. In 1968, he was traded from the Lions to the Pittsburgh Steelers, but was waived before ever playing a game in Pittsburgh.

Hilgenberg was picked up off waivers by the Vikings and played for another dozen seasons, though 1979. During that time, he was one of 11 players to appear in all four of the Vikings' Super Bowls (IV, VIII, IX, XI).

== Personal life ==
Hilgenberg's daughter Kristi was Miss Minnesota Teen USA 1998. His grandson Luke Lindahl was a linebacker for the Iowa Hawkeyes.

== Death ==
Hilgenberg died at age 66 in 2008, after battling amyotrophic lateral sclerosis or Lou Gehrig's disease for several years. After his death, brain dissection found advanced chronic traumatic encephalopathy (CTE), which mimics many ALS symptoms. He was one of at least 345 NFL players to be diagnosed after death with this disease, which is caused by repeated hits to the head.

== See also ==
- Purple People Eaters
- List of NFL players with chronic traumatic encephalopathy
