= Joe Laws =

American football player (1911–1979)

No. 38, 29, 24
- Position: Halfback

Personal information
- Born: June 16, 1911; Colfax, Iowa, U.S.
- Died: August 22, 1979 (aged 68); Green Bay, Wisconsin, U.S.
- Listed height: 5 ft 9 in (1.75 m)
- Listed weight: 186 lb (84 kg)

Career information
- College: Iowa

Career history
- Green Bay Packers (1934–1945)

Awards and highlights
- 3× NFL champion (1936, 1939, 1944); Green Bay Packers Hall of Fame; Second-team All-American (1933); Chicago Tribune Silver Football (1933); First-team All-Big Ten (1933)
- Stats at Pro Football Reference

Joseph Ray Laws (June 16, 1911 – August 22, 1979) was an American football player. He played his entire career with the Green Bay Packers, winning three World Championships, and was inducted into the Green Bay Packers Hall of Fame in 1972. Prior to joining the Packers, Laws attended the University of Iowa where he was a member of Sigma Pi fraternity. While at Iowa he was named All-Big Ten quarterback and the Big Ten Most Valuable Player in 1933.

Aided by his Packer backfield mates, Joe Laws cuts with the ball against the Chicago Bears, 1942.

On December 17, 1944, Joe Laws set an NFL postseason record (since broken), by intercepting 3 passes in the Packers' 14–7 victory over the Giants in the league title game.
