= Lamb House (disambiguation) =

The Lamb House is owned by the National Trust for Places of Historic Interest or Natural Beauty in Rye, East Sussex, England (UK).

Lamb House or Lambhouse may also refer to:

- Lafayette Lamb House, listed on the National Register of Historic Places in Clinton County, Iowa (USA)
- Lamb House, Kangaroo Point, Queensland, Australia
- Lambhouse: The Collection 1991–1998, 2003 compilation record by Unsane
