= Charles Pelton =

American politician (born 1940)

Member of the Iowa House of Representatives
- In office 1967–1973

Personal details
- Born: August 15, 1940 (age 86) Clinton, Iowa, United States
- Party: Republican
- Occupation: lawyer

Charles Howard Pelton (born August 15, 1940) was an American politician in the state of Iowa.

Pelton was born in Clinton, Iowa. He attended the University of Iowa and is a lawyer. He served in the Iowa House of Representatives from 1967 to 1973 as a Republican.
