= Howes Building =

- U.S. National Register of Historic Places
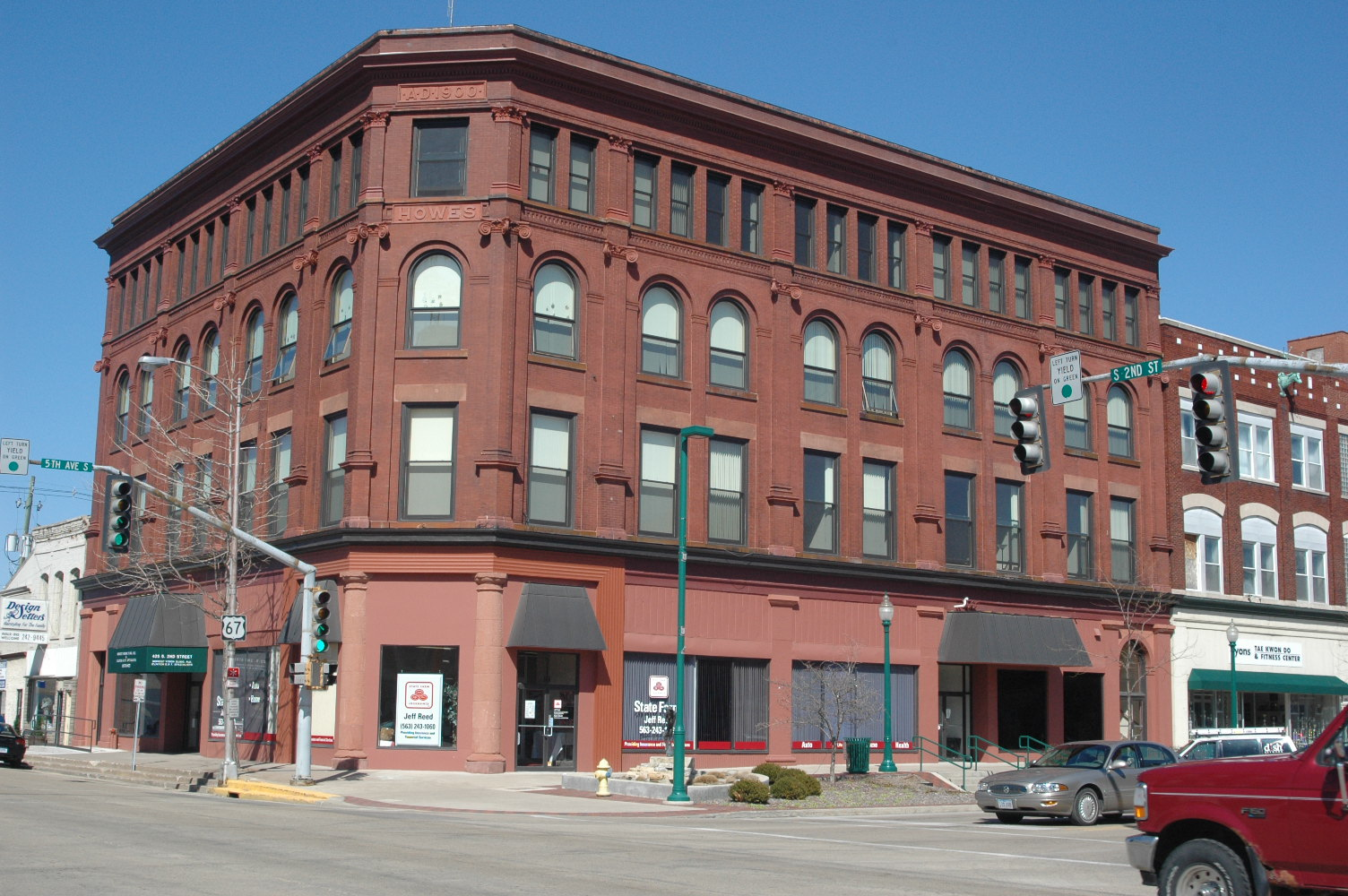

- Location within Iowa Location within the United States
- Location: 419-425 Second St. S Clinton, Iowa
- Coordinates: 41°50′30″N 90°11′15″W
- Area: less than one acre
- Built: 1900
- Built by: John Lake
- Architect: Josiah Rice; A.H. Morell, et al.
- Architectural style: Classical Revival
- NRHP reference No.: 04001351
- Added to NRHP: December 15, 2004

The Howes Building is a historic building located in Clinton, Iowa, United States. The four-story, brick, Neoclassical structure features arched windows, pilasters, and a chamfered corner. At one time it had a prominent entrance on the corner that was flanked by columns in the Doric order. The columns remain in place even though the entrance has been modified. The architect for the first three stories, finished in 1900, was Josiah Rice. The fourth story, finished five years later, was designed by John Morrell. Both were local architects, Morrell having purchased the Rice firm in 1903. The contractor was John Lake. Edward M. Howes had the building constructed during a period of population and economic growth in Clinton. The two upper floors have housed the offices of local professionals. The first and second floors have housed various retail establishments, including Kline's Department Store, Stage Department Store, Jefferson Billiards Shop, Metzger and Cavanaugh Men's Tailors, and the Kaybee Store. The building has been listed in the National Register of Historic Places since 2004.
