= Curtis Bros. & Co =

Curtis Bros. & Co. was a leading producer of doors, sashes, blinds and general house finishings between 1866 and 1966. The company was the first to produce pre-glazed window units.

== Company beginnings ==
The firm was started in 1866 by Charles F. Curtis and W.G. Hemingway; they had been engaged in the grocery business for a short time in Clinton, Iowa. They bought out the Claussen and Thornburg interests in the firm of Claussen, Thornburg & Smith, a small sash and door factory. (The original firm was known as Curtis, Hemingway & Co.)

In 1867 George M. Curtis bought out the company holding of Mr. Smith, and in 1868 Charles F. Curtis and George M. Curtis bought out Hemmingway's interest.

In the fall of 1868 Judson E. Carpenter, who was an uncle of Charles F. and George M., came to Clinton, Iowa, from Rochelle, Illinois, and invested with them, and the firm name, adopted at that time, was Curtis Bros. & Co. Their business at that time was the manufacturing of sash, doors, blinds, mouldings, stair work and everything pertaining to that class of manufacturing.

== Incorporation ==
On June 1, 1881, the business was incorporated without changing the name of the concern. The incorporators were Judson S. Carpenter, George M. Curtis, Charles F. Curtis, Cornelius S. Curtis, Fowler P. Stone and George W. Allen. At the time of the incorporation, they immediately started to build a factory at Wausau, Wisconsin, which was completed by January 1, 1882, and started to manufacture goods at that time, under the management of Cornelius S. Curtis and Fowler P. Stone.

A few years later, Mr. Stone retired from the company and became a member of the Stone & Mortenson Lumber Co. at Wausau, Wisconsin.

The Wausau business was a branch of the original house at Clinton until January 1, 1893, when it was sold to the Curtis & Yale Co., the new company, at the same time, buying out Carpenter Bros. & Co. of Minneapolis, who were engaged in the jobbing of sash and doors at that point.

The business at Wausau was later managed by Cornelius S. Curtis and their branch distributing house at Minneapolis, by Stephen M. Yale.

In January, 1898, Curtis & Yale Co. established a warehouse at Milwaukee, which was under the management of A.L. Annes.

In January, 1894, Curtis Bros. & Co. opened a branch house, for the distribution of their goods, at Lincoln, Nebraska, which became known as the Curtis & Bartlett Co. and was under the management of Paul Bartlett.

In May, 1897, they opened a branch house at Sioux City, Iowa, which was a part of the original house at Clinton, while the Lincoln house became a separate company.

From 1881 to 1895, Curtis Bros. & Co. indirectly operated a large saw mill at Rib Lake, Wisconsin, having in that locality a large tract of pine land. The lumber manufactured there was largely used at the factories in Clinton and Wausau.

== Charles F. Curtis ==
Charles F. Curtis, the founder of the business, was born at Oxford, New York, in 1846, and moved with his parents, John S. Curtis and Elizabeth Carpenter Curtis, to Rochelle, Illinois, in 1856, where he lived and worked on a farm, attending the country schools until he was 19 years old. He then attended school in Chicago one year, came to Clinton, engaging in the grocery business a short time and then started the sash and door business. While the manufacture of sash, doors, etc., had been the business which has occupied the most of his time, he was prominently identified with other business enterprises, and was a director in the City National bank of Clinton for many years.

== George M. Curtis ==
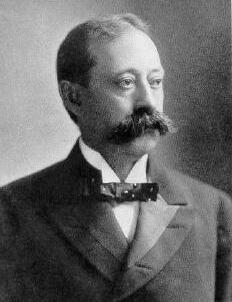

George M. Curtis was born at Oxford, New York, in 1844, moving with his parents to Rochelle, Illinois, where he lived and worked on a farm, attended and taught school until 1865, when he engaged in the coal business at Cortland, Illinois, coming from there to Clinton in 1867 and associated himself with his brother, Charles F., in the sash and door business. Mr. Curtis was very prominent in the business and political circles of the state of Iowa, he like his brother, was very interested in other business enterprises and, for a number of years, was vice-president of the City National bank of Clinton.

In 1887 he was elected to the legislature of Iowa and served one term.

In 1894 he was elected to represent the second congressional district of Iowa in congress and again reelected in 1896.

== Cornelius S. Curtis ==
Cornelius S. Curtis was born in Oxford, New York, in 1851, and moved with his parents to Rochelle and again, with his parents, to Clinton in 1869. He was engaged in the grocery business in Clinton for a while and later in business at Denison, Iowa, returning to Clinton to take a position with Curtis Bros. & Co. and in 1881, when the firm was incorporated, went to Wausau, Wisconsin as manager of the Wausau business.

He like his brothers, was also interested in other enterprises, the principal one being the Fenwood Lumber Co. near Wausau, Wisconsin.

== Judson E. Carpenter ==
Judson E. Carpenter, who was an uncle of the Curtis brothers, was born in Oxford, New York, in 1835, where he lived on a farm, taught school until 1855, when he moved to Rochelle, Illinois, where he bought and operated a farm for a few years, when he went into the coal business at Rochelle, retiring from that business to engage with the Curtis brothers at Clinton, Iowa, in 1866 and was the president of Curtis Bros. & Co.

In 1893, he engaged in the lumber business with his sons at Minneapolis, the firm known as the Carpenter-Lamb Co. He was, vice-president of the Brainard & Northern Minnesota Railroad, which had its headquarters at Minneapolis, Minnesota.

== George W. Allen ==
George W. Allen was born in Rochester, New York in 1844, moving with his parents to Boston in 1846, where he attended school until 1862, when he went to Rochelle, Illinois, and immediately commenced working at the carpenter's trade, continuing same until 1868, when he went to Clinton, Iowa, and took a position in the factory of Curtis Bros. & Co., where he remained until 1876, when he went into the office and in 1881 became a member of the company. He supervised the odd work department of Curtis Bros. & Co.
