= Clinton, Iowa =

- City
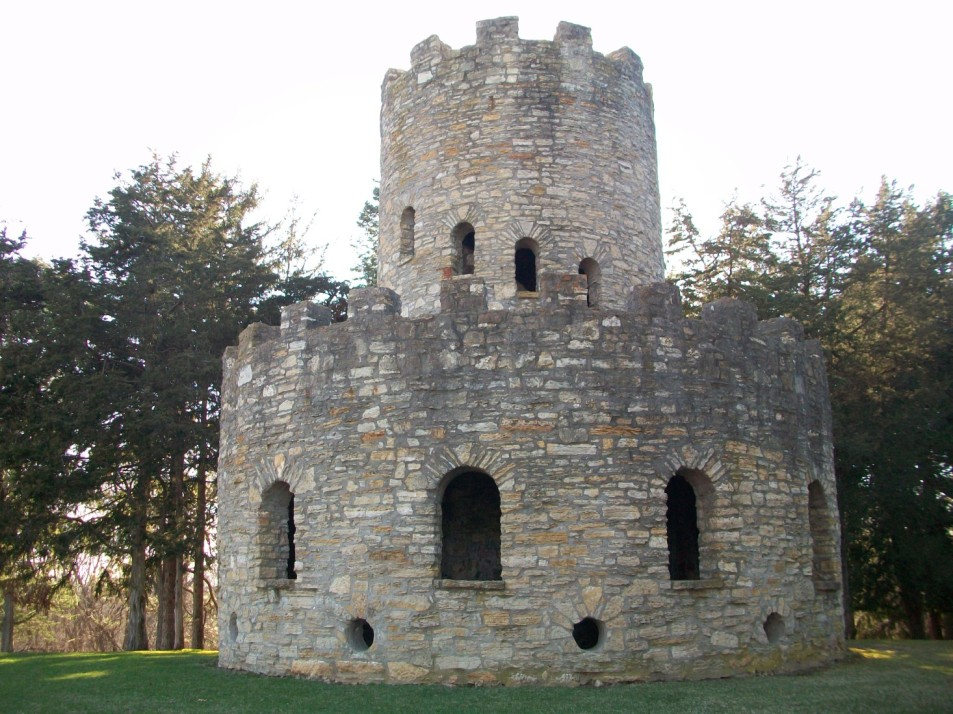
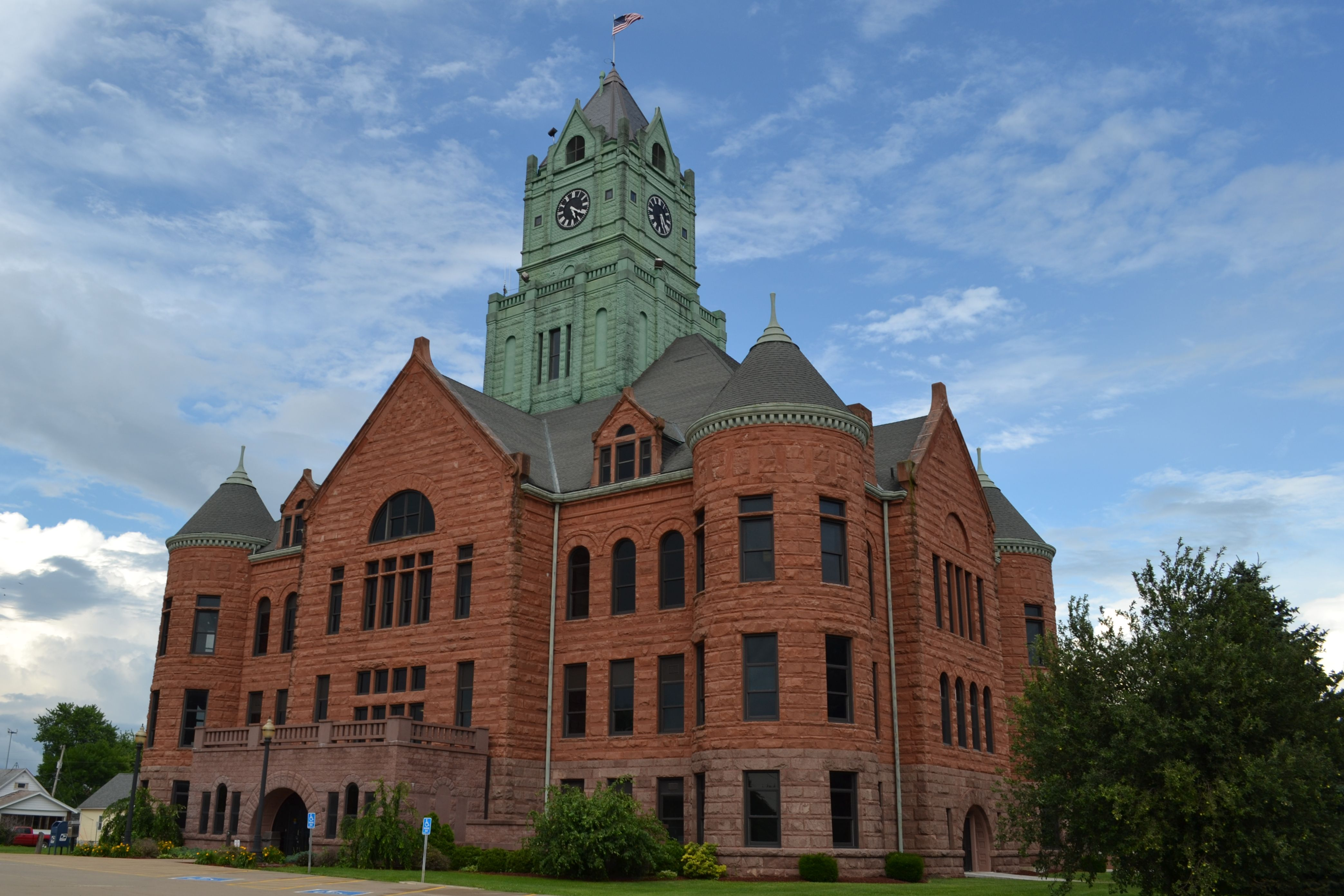
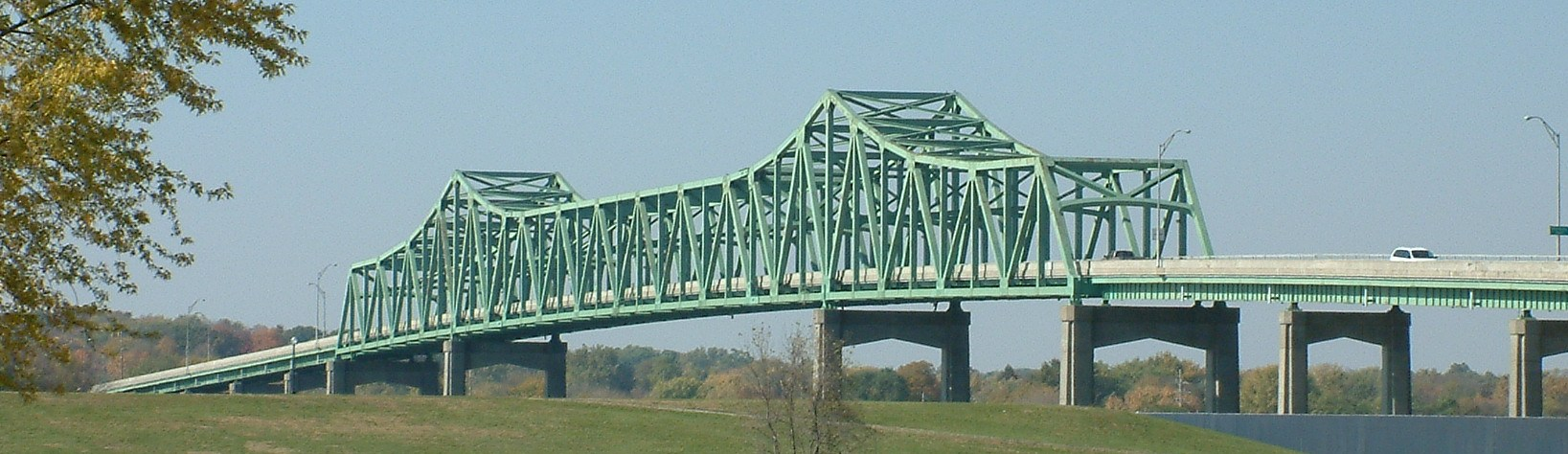
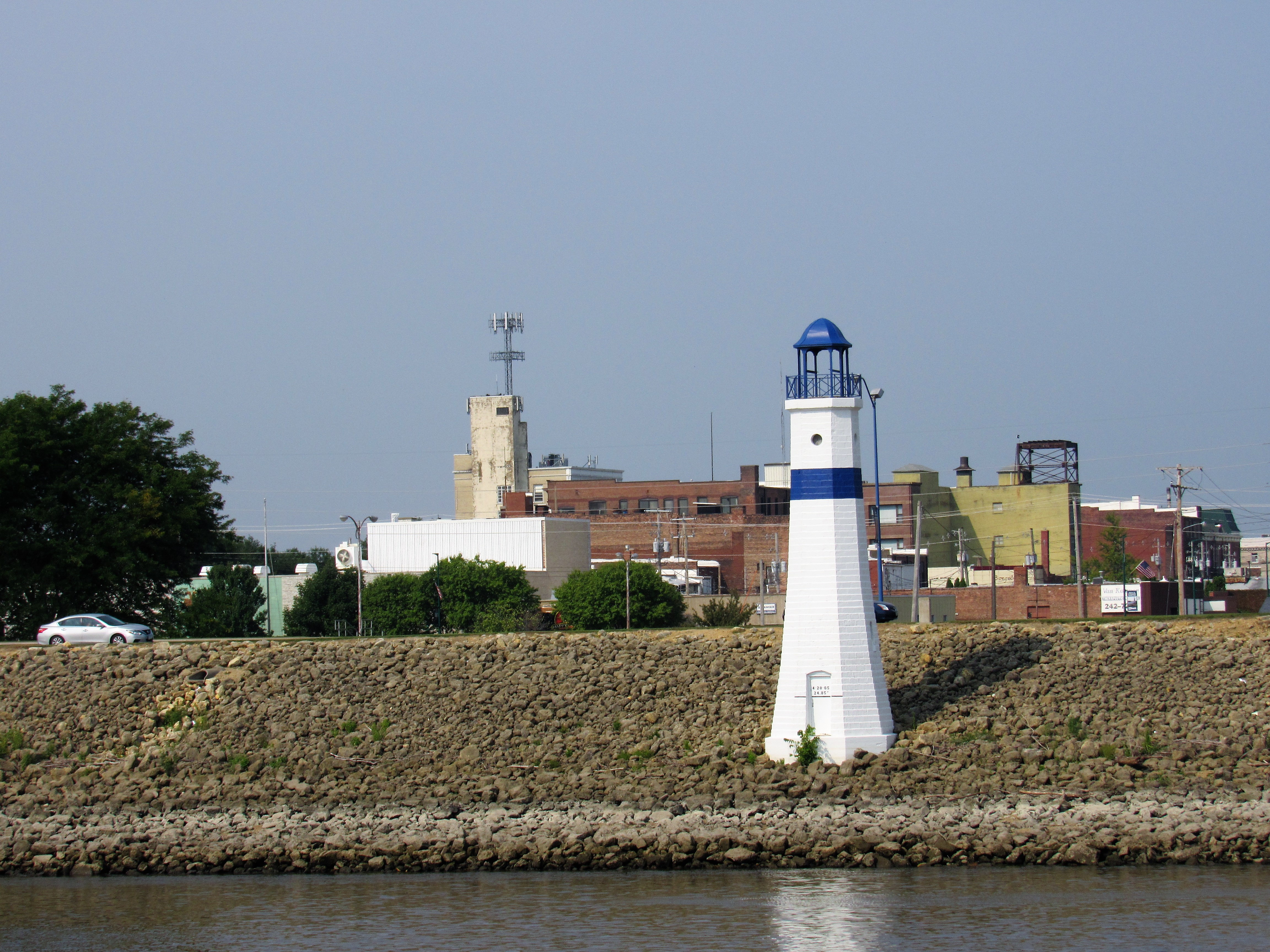
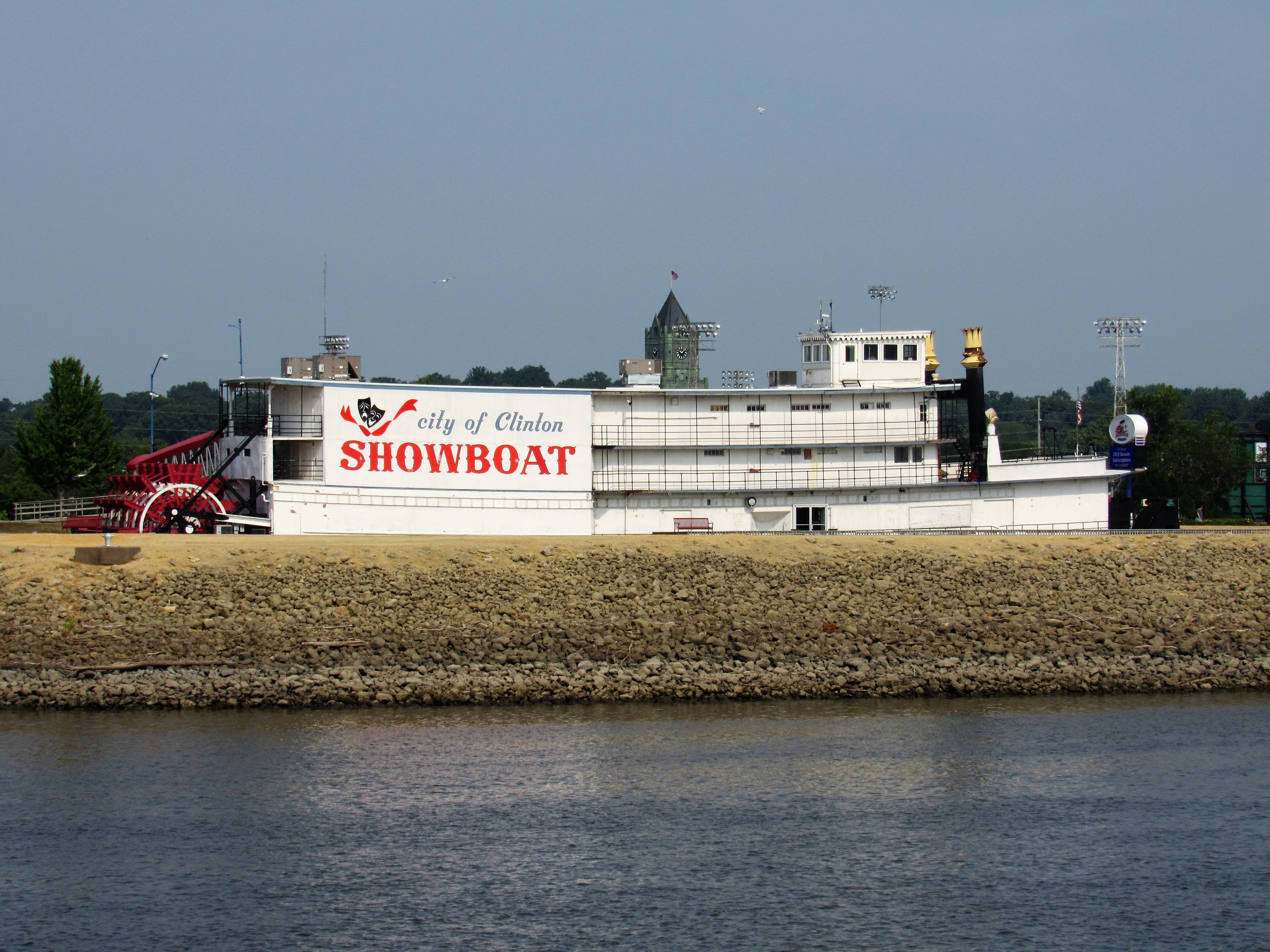
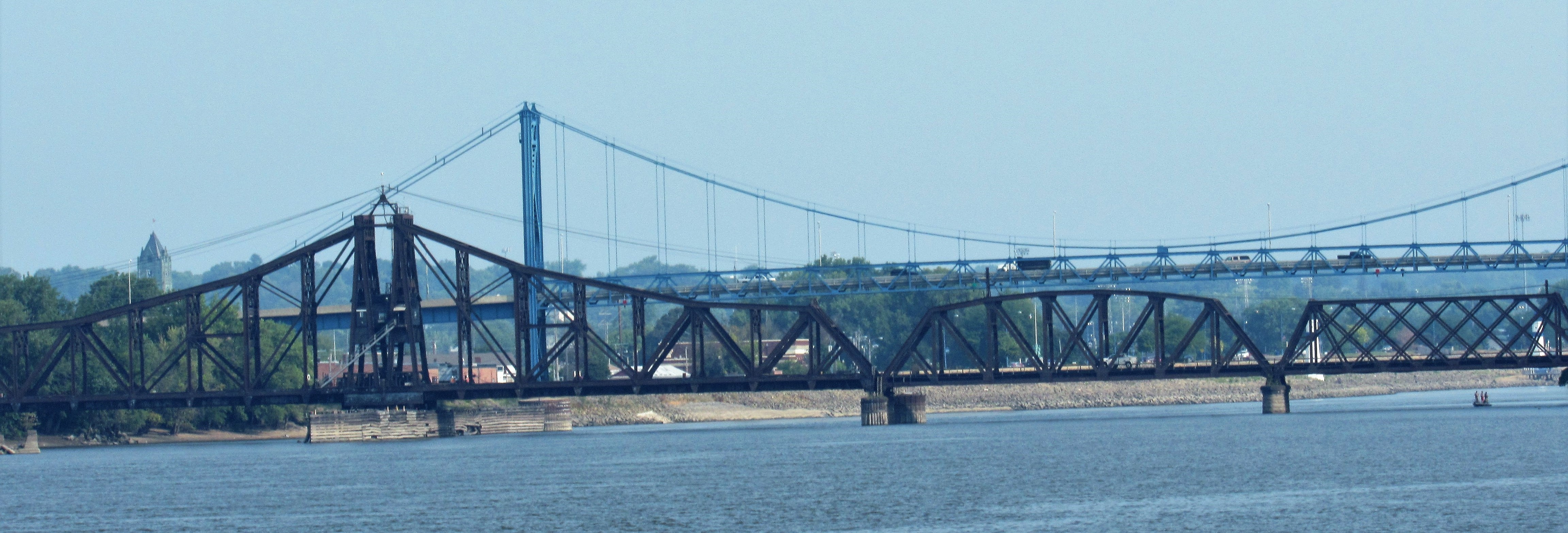
- Eagle Point Park Courthouse Mark Morris Memorial Bridge Clinton Riverfront Showboat Theatre Gateway Bridge and Clinton Railroad Bridge

- Flag
- Motto: So many things to do - With a river view!
- Location in the state of Iowa
- Coordinates: 41°50′49″N 90°12′26″W
- Country: United States
- State: Iowa
- County: Clinton
- Incorporated: January 26, 1857
- Named for: DeWitt Clinton

Government
  - Mayor: Scott Maddasion

Area
  - Total: 38.46 sq mi (99.62 km^{2})
  - Land: 35.60 sq mi (92.20 km^{2})
  - Water: 2.86 sq mi (7.42 km^{2})
- Elevation: 607 ft (185 m)

Population (2020)
  - Total: 24,469
  - Rank: 21st in Iowa
  - Density: 687.3/sq mi (265.38/km^{2})
  - Summer (DST): UTC−5
- ZIP codes: 52732-52734, 52736, 52771
- Area code: 563
- FIPS code: 19-14430
- GNIS feature ID: 0455480
- Website: www.cityofclintoniowa.gov

Clinton is a city in and the county seat of Clinton County, Iowa, United States. It borders the Mississippi River. The population was 24,469 as of 2020.

Clinton, along with DeWitt (also located in Clinton County), was named in honor of the sixth governor of New York, DeWitt Clinton. Incorporated on January 26, 1857, Clinton is the principal city of the Clinton Micropolitan Statistical Area, which is coterminous with Clinton County.

== History ==
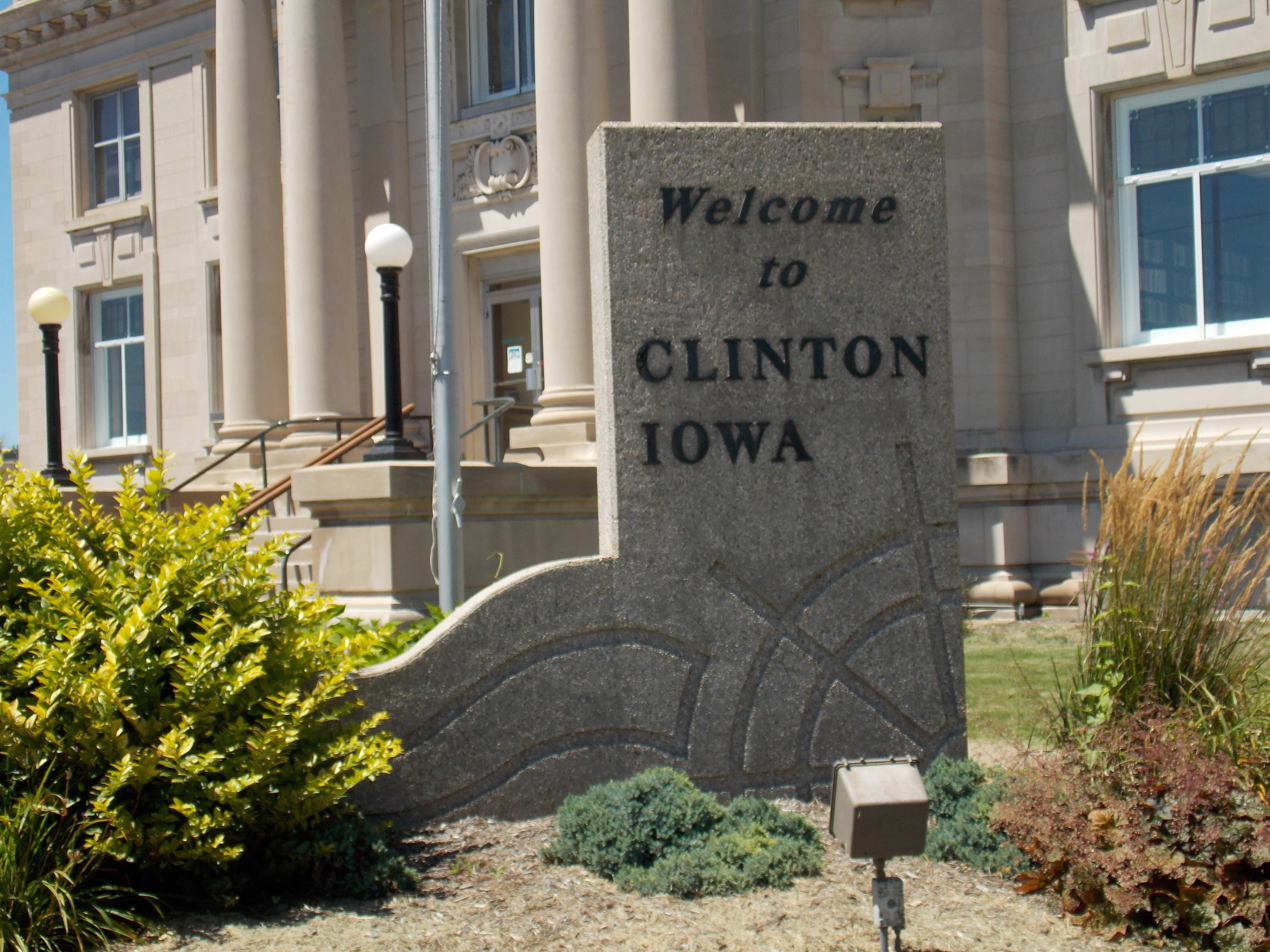
Welcome to Clinton, Iowa

Elijah Buell, among the first European-American settlers in the Clinton area, established the town of Lyons in 1837. It was named after the French city Lyon. It grew with the lumber and railroad industry through the century, and merged in 1895 with the City of Clinton.

Clinton was platted as the Town of New York in 1836 by Joseph Bartlett. He was looking for gold deposits in the area.

In 1855, the Chicago, Iowa, Nebraska Railroad announced it would build a bridge across the Mississippi River at Little Rock Island. The Iowa Land Company named the town as Clinton, in honor of DeWitt Clinton, governor of New York State. A general city charter was adopted in 1857. Lyons Female College was established in 1858.

Clinton's population grew to more than 1,000 as construction of the bridge continued. In 1859, the railroad line was completed to Cedar Rapids. Fifty years later, the single-track railroad bridge was replaced by a double-track bridge that was completed in 1909.

Between the 1850s and 1900, Lyons and Clinton quickly became centers of the lumber industry and together were regarded as the "Lumber Capital of the World". In the 1880s and 1890s, Clinton boasted more millionaires per capita than any other city in the nation. In 1895, the town of Lyons officially merged with the city of Clinton.

By the end of 1900, the northern forests were depleted and the sawmills closed. The railroad and river, providing economical transportation in all directions, attracted manufacturing and heavy industry. The city still boasts a number of magnificent Victorian mansions built during that time. Among these is the George M. Curtis House.

In 1925, Clinton acquired Eagle Point Park as part of its park system.

In 1956, the Gateway Bridge (Illinois–Iowa) was opened.

In 1965, the Mississippi River crested at 24.85 feet, effectively flooding the city of Clinton as well as many other cities along the Mississippi. The US Army Corps of Engineers began a seven-year, $28.9 million levee project. An 8.1-mile dyke, 4,330 feet of concrete flood wall, six pumping stations, seven closure structures, five major street crossings; 17,320 feet of new sewer; and 23 gate wells were completed and dedicated in June 1981.

In 2005, Clinton was awarded one of the inaugural Iowa Great Places designations. Under this award, Clinton received a $1 million state budget allocation for cultural and landscape improvements along the city's riverfront.

In 2009, Archer Daniels Midland began construction of a new cogeneration plant to Clinton. This has brought more jobs and workers to Clinton.

In 2016, the city obtained the certification for Lincolnway Industrial Rail and Air Park. The park is located adjacent to US Highway 30 and the Clinton Municipal Airport. The Union Pacific East-West Mainline runs to the south, with a dedicated spur running into the park. Targeted industries for the Clinton Region included chemicals processing, metal fabrication, and value-added agriculture. Rail.One, HeroBX, and Atlas Roofing Corporation were expected to occupy the Rail Park in 2025.

In the 2010s–2020s, many businesses expanded, adding hundreds of new jobs to the area. These businesses include Big River Packaging, Nestle Purina, and Archer Daniels Midland. They invested millions of dollars into the community. This catalyzed the development of new suburban housing developments, restaurants, and recreational attractions.

In 2020, Clinton received a grant from 'Iowa Great Places'. It dedicated to a project known as 'Even More Things to Do with a River View.' Funds were used to improve the city's riverfront and improve public access.

In 2023, the historic Clinton High School was torn down. The newly built Clinton High was opened for student use. Additionally, the 'Tailgate N' Tallboys' concert brought nearly 9,000 people to Clinton for a 3-day concert series.

== Geography ==
According to the United States Census Bureau, the city has a total area of 38.01 square miles (98.45 km^{2}), of which 35.15 square miles (91.04 km^{2}) is land and 2.86 square miles (7.41 km^{2}) is water.

Clinton is on the western shore of the Mississippi River and is the easternmost city in Iowa. The Upper Mississippi River National Wildlife and Fish Refuge passes through Clinton along the river.

The pool of the Mississippi River above Lock and Dam No. 13 is the widest section of the river at 1.8 miles (2.9 km) across.

=== Climate ===
Climate data for Clinton, Iowa (1991–2020 normals, extremes 1893–present)
Month	Jan	Feb	Mar	Apr	May	Jun	Jul	Aug	Sep	Oct	Nov	Dec	Year
Record high °F (°C)	69 (21)	73 (23)	87 (31)	94 (34)	102 (39)	107 (42)	109 (43)	106 (41)	103 (39)	92 (33)	80 (27)	74 (23)	109 (43)
Mean maximum °F (°C)	51.3 (10.7)	55.8 (13.2)	71.5 (21.9)	81.7 (27.6)	88.0 (31.1)	92.0 (33.3)	93.7 (34.3)	92.0 (33.3)	89.2 (31.8)	82.4 (28.0)	68.2 (20.1)	54.7 (12.6)	95.0 (35.0)
Mean daily maximum °F (°C)	29.4 (−1.4)	34.3 (1.3)	48.2 (9.0)	62.1 (16.7)	72.8 (22.7)	81.1 (27.3)	83.9 (28.8)	81.6 (27.6)	75.8 (24.3)	63.1 (17.3)	47.6 (8.7)	34.6 (1.4)	59.5 (15.3)
Daily mean °F (°C)	21.9 (−5.6)	26.3 (−3.2)	38.7 (3.7)	51.0 (10.6)	62.1 (16.7)	71.1 (21.7)	74.4 (23.6)	72.2 (22.3)	65.3 (18.5)	53.0 (11.7)	39.3 (4.1)	27.5 (−2.5)	50.2 (10.1)
Mean daily minimum °F (°C)	14.3 (−9.8)	18.4 (−7.6)	29.1 (−1.6)	40.0 (4.4)	51.3 (10.7)	61.1 (16.2)	64.8 (18.2)	62.8 (17.1)	54.7 (12.6)	43.0 (6.1)	30.9 (−0.6)	20.5 (−6.4)	40.9 (4.9)
Mean minimum °F (°C)	−10.3 (−23.5)	−3.8 (−19.9)	8.3 (−13.2)	24.0 (−4.4)	35.3 (1.8)	48.1 (8.9)	53.7 (12.1)	52.5 (11.4)	38.7 (3.7)	25.7 (−3.5)	12.6 (−10.8)	−1.4 (−18.6)	−14.1 (−25.6)
Record low °F (°C)	−29 (−34)	−29 (−34)	−15 (−26)	7 (−14)	24 (−4)	37 (3)	41 (5)	39 (4)	19 (−7)	7 (−14)	−8 (−22)	−27 (−33)	−29 (−34)
Average precipitation inches (mm)	1.45 (37)	1.68 (43)	2.32 (59)	3.40 (86)	4.39 (112)	4.74 (120)	3.89 (99)	4.20 (107)	3.69 (94)	2.64 (67)	2.19 (56)	1.86 (47)	36.45 (926)
Average snowfall inches (cm)	9.2 (23)	7.5 (19)	3.9 (9.9)	0.8 (2.0)	0.0 (0.0)	0.0 (0.0)	0.0 (0.0)	0.0 (0.0)	0.0 (0.0)	0.3 (0.76)	2.3 (5.8)	7.9 (20)	31.9 (81)
Average precipitation days (≥ 0.01 in)	9.9	8.1	9.9	11.4	12.7	11.9	9.4	9.5	8.2	9.0	8.5	9.8	118.3
Average snowy days (≥ 0.1 in)	6.7	5.2	2.8	0.6	0.0	0.0	0.0	0.0	0.0	0.2	1.3	5.8	22.6
Source: NOAA

== Demographics ==
Historical population
Census	Pop.	Note	%±
1870	6,129		—
1880	9,052		47.7%
1890	13,619		50.5%
1900	22,698		66.7%
1910	25,577		12.7%
1920	24,161		−5.5%
1930	25,726		6.5%
1940	26,270		2.1%
1950	30,379		15.6%
1960	33,589		10.6%
1970	34,719		3.4%
1980	32,828		−5.4%
1990	29,201		−11.0%
2000	27,772		−4.9%
2010	26,885		−3.2%
2020	24,469		−9.0%
U.S. Decennial Census

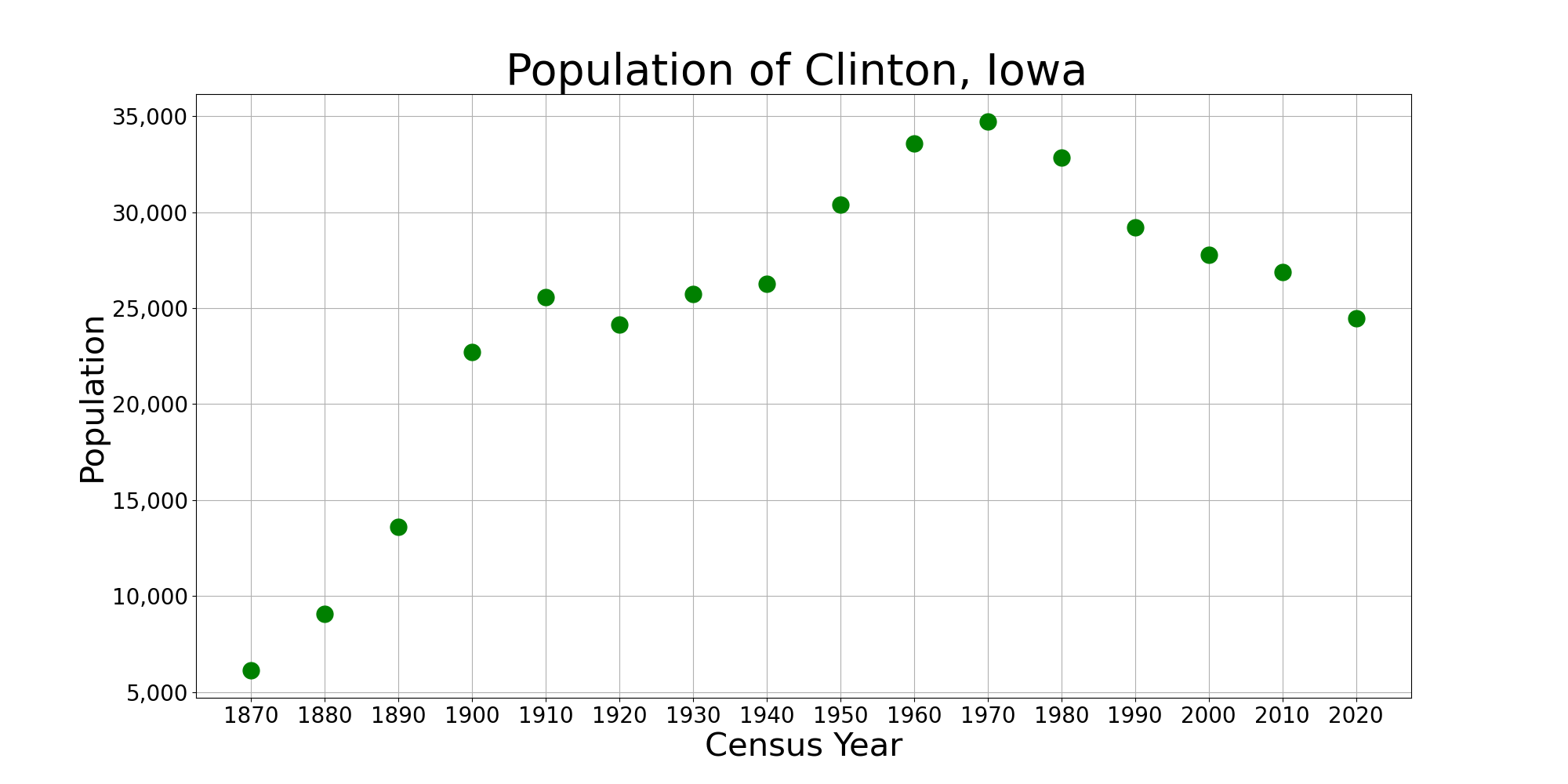
The population of Clinton, Iowa, from US census data

=== 2020 census ===
As of the 2020 census, Clinton had a population of 24,469. The population density was 687.3 inhabitants per square mile (265.4/km^{2}). There were 11,864 housing units at an average density of 333.3 per square mile (128.7/km^{2}).

The median age was 41.4 years. 24.9% of the residents were under the age of 20 (22.6% under 18), 5.1% were between the ages of 20 and 24, 23.7% were from 25 to 44, 26.5% were from 45 to 64, and 19.8% were 65 years of age or older. For every 100 females there were 94.6 males, and for every 100 females age 18 and over there were 92.0 males age 18 and over.

94.5% of residents lived in urban areas, while 5.5% lived in rural areas.

There were 10,440 households and 6,201 families in the city. Of all households, 26.7% had children under the age of 18 living in them, 39.9% were married-couple households, 9.4% were cohabitating couples, 29.4% were households with a female householder and no spouse or partner present, and 21.4% were households with a male householder and no spouse or partner present. About 40.6% of all households were non-families, 33.6% were made up of individuals, and 14.4% had someone living alone who was 65 years of age or older.

Housing units had a vacancy rate of 12.0%; the homeowner vacancy rate was 3.5% and the rental vacancy rate was 12.8%.

Racial composition as of the 2020 census
Race	Number	Percent
White	21,028	85.9%
Black or African American	1,236	5.1%
American Indian and Alaska Native	98	0.4%
Asian	195	0.8%
Native Hawaiian and Other Pacific Islander	13	0.1%
Some other race	367	1.5%
Two or more races	1,532	6.3%
Hispanic or Latino (of any race)	1,050	4.3%

=== 2010 census ===
As of the census of 2010, there were 26,885 people, 11,246 households, and 6,889 families residing in the city. The population density was 764.9 inhabitants per square mile (295.3/km^{2}). There were 12,202 housing units at an average density of 347.1 per square mile (134.0/km^{2}). The racial makeup of the city was 91.0% White, 4.3% African American, 0.4% Native American, 0.7% Asian, 1.1% from other races, and 2.5% from two or more races. Hispanic or Latino of any race were 3.3% of the population.

There were 11,246 households, of which 29.5% had children under the age of 18 living with them, 43.0% were married couples living together, 12.7% had a female householder with no husband present, 5.6% had a male householder with no wife present, and 38.7% were non-families. 32.1% of all households were made up of individuals, and 13.7% had someone living alone who was 65 years of age or older. The average household size was 2.33 and the average family size was 2.90.

The median age in the city was 40.4 years. 23.1% of residents were under the age of 18; 9.3% were between the ages of 18 and 24; 22.8% were from 25 to 44; 27.6% were from 45 to 64; and 17.1% were 65 years of age or older. The gender makeup of the city was 48.5% male and 51.5% female.

=== 2000 census ===
As of the census of 2000, there were 27,772 people, 11,427 households, and 7,358 families residing in the city. The population density was 780.9 inhabitants per square mile (301.5/km^{2}). There were 12,412 housing units at an average density of 349.0 per square mile (134.7/km^{2}). The racial makeup of the city was 93.80% White, 3.22% African American, 0.32% Native American, 0.81% Asian, 0.01% Pacific Islander, 0.51% from other races, and 1.34% from two or more races. Hispanic or Latino of any race were 1.68% of the population.

There were 11,427 households, out of which 30.1% had children under the age of 18 living with them, 48.9% were married couples living together, 11.7% had a female householder with no husband present, and 35.6% were non-families. 30.2% of all households were made up of individuals, and 13.0% had someone living alone who was 65 years of age or older. The average household size was 2.36 and the average family size was 2.93.

Age spread: 24.6% under the age of 18, 9.1% from 18 to 24, 26.8% from 25 to 44, 22.5% from 45 to 64, and 17.0% who were 65 years of age or older. The median age was 38 years. For every 100 females, there were 91.3 males. For every 100 females age 18 and over, there were 88.1 males.

In the 2000 census 37.7% of the population reported they were of German ancestry, 15.3% of Irish ancestry, 11.4% of British (English, Scottish, Welsh or Scots-Irish) ancestry, 7.8% of Scandinavian ancestry and 5.8% of Dutch ancestry.

The median income for a household in the city was $34,159, and the median income for a family was $43,157. Males had a median income of $34,210 versus $20,882 for females. The per capita income for the city was $17,320. About 10.0% of families and 12.5% of the population were below the poverty line, including 18.5% of those under age 18 and 7.7% of those age 65 or over.

== Parks and recreation ==
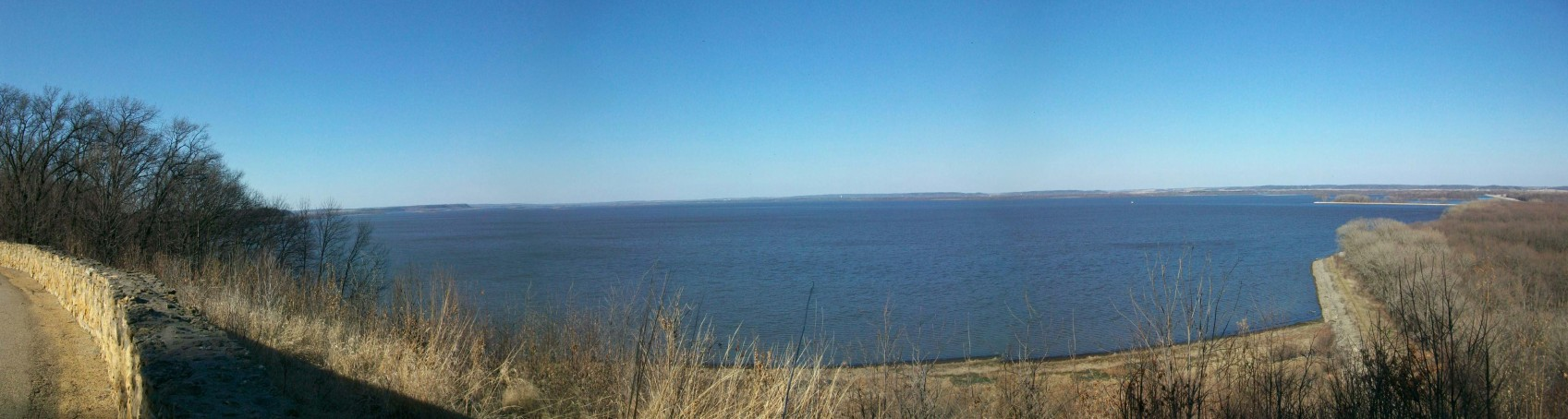
Panoramic view of the Mississippi River from Eagle Point Park

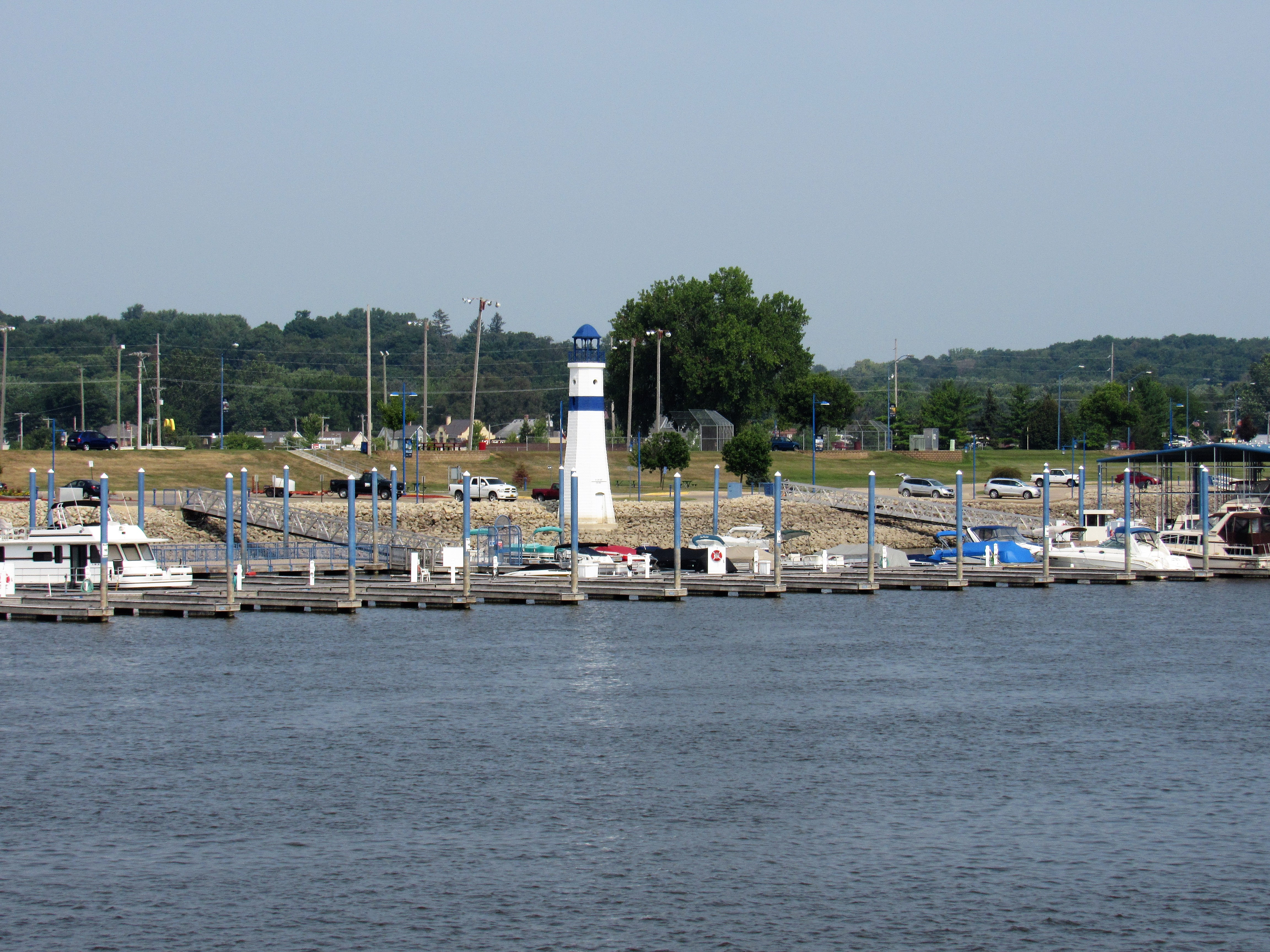
Clinton Riverfront Park

- Eagle Point Park is a 164-acre park located on the north side of the City. It is on the bluffs overlooking the Mississippi River. It includes the Eagle Point Lodge, Soaring Eagle Nature Center, Flannery one-room schoolhouse, many playgrounds, Prairie Pastures Dog Park, A Disc Golf Course, Equestrian Center and trails, Mississippi River Overlook, Picnic Areas, a restored prairie and butterfly gardens, approximately 3 miles of hiking trails, a waterfall, and a large stone castle.
- Riverview Park is a 65-acre park overlooking the Mississippi River encompassing several features including a marina and restaurant, public boat ramps, Pickleball courts, sand volleyball courts, ball diamonds, Lubbers Fountain, large municipal swimming pool, picnic areas, Riverview Bandshell, skate park, playground, RV Park, bike path, Showboat theatre, and prospect league baseball stadium.
- Other parks in the City of Clinton are Dewitt Park, Clinton Park, Chancy Park, Rotary Park, Hawthorne Park, Emma Young Park, and Lyons Four Square Park.
- The Clinton Fitness Court is part of a nationwide effort launched by the National Fitness Campaign to get people excited about health and wellness. Located on the Riverfront, it is accessible to those of all needs and abilities.
- The Parks and Recreation Department offers over 170 recreation programs designed for all ages from preschoolers to young adults, adults, and seniors.
- Clinton is home to many walking and biking trails all across town.
- The Parks and Recreation Department and Administrative Office, better known as the Ericksen Community Center, is located on the northernmost part of 148 acres of Emma Young Park. There are three USA Softball certified softball fields, four tennis courts, a cross country running trail, a playground, and a public pond.
- The Jurgensen Soccer Complex was re-opened in the fall of 2020 following a major expansion. The previously featured 3-Tiered playing field limited the ability to grow, and was not accessible for everyone. The new renovation features flattened fields so that children, parents, and families of all ages and abilities may enjoy the game of soccer.

== Tourist attractions ==
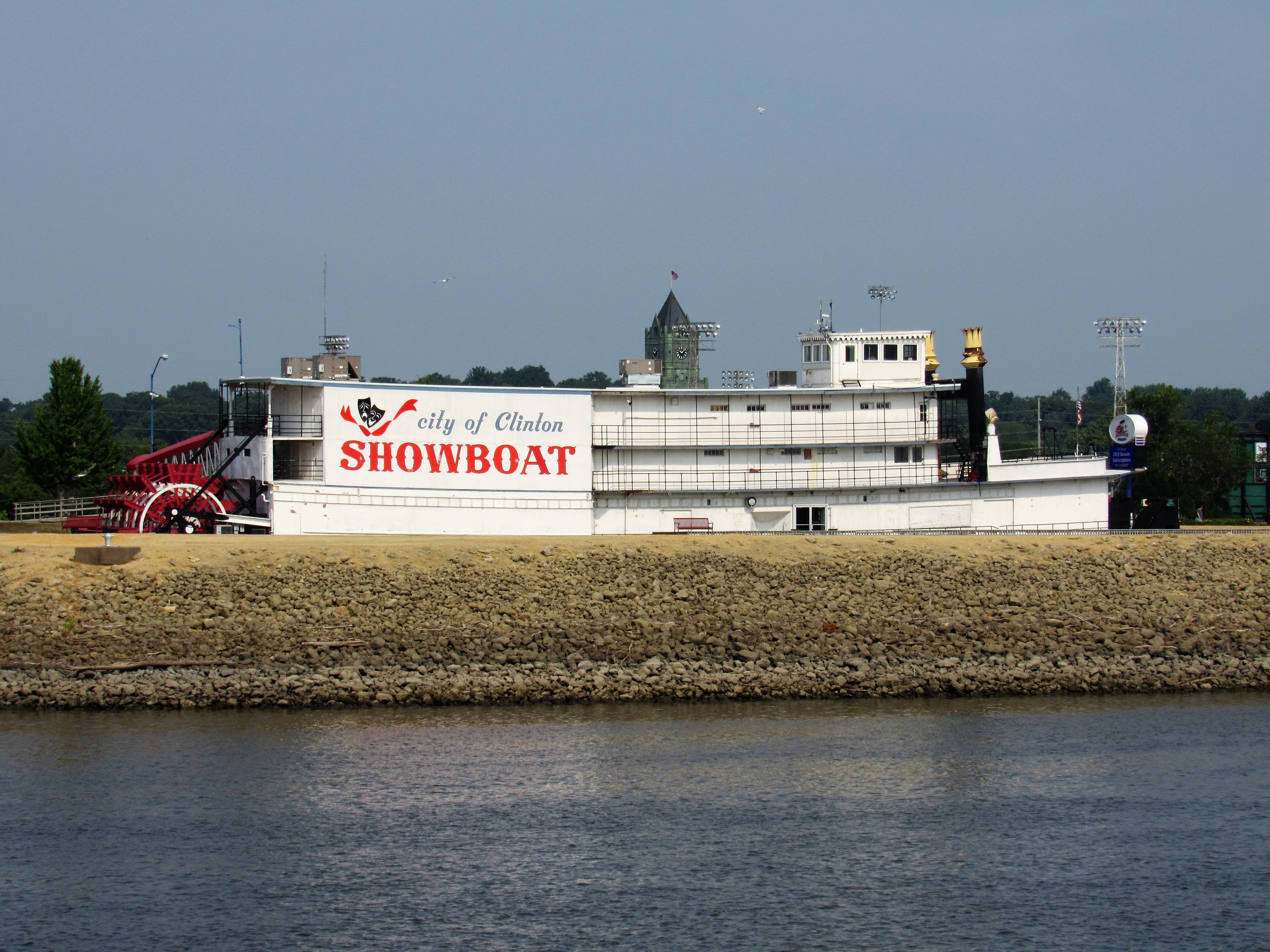
Clinton Area Showboat Theatre

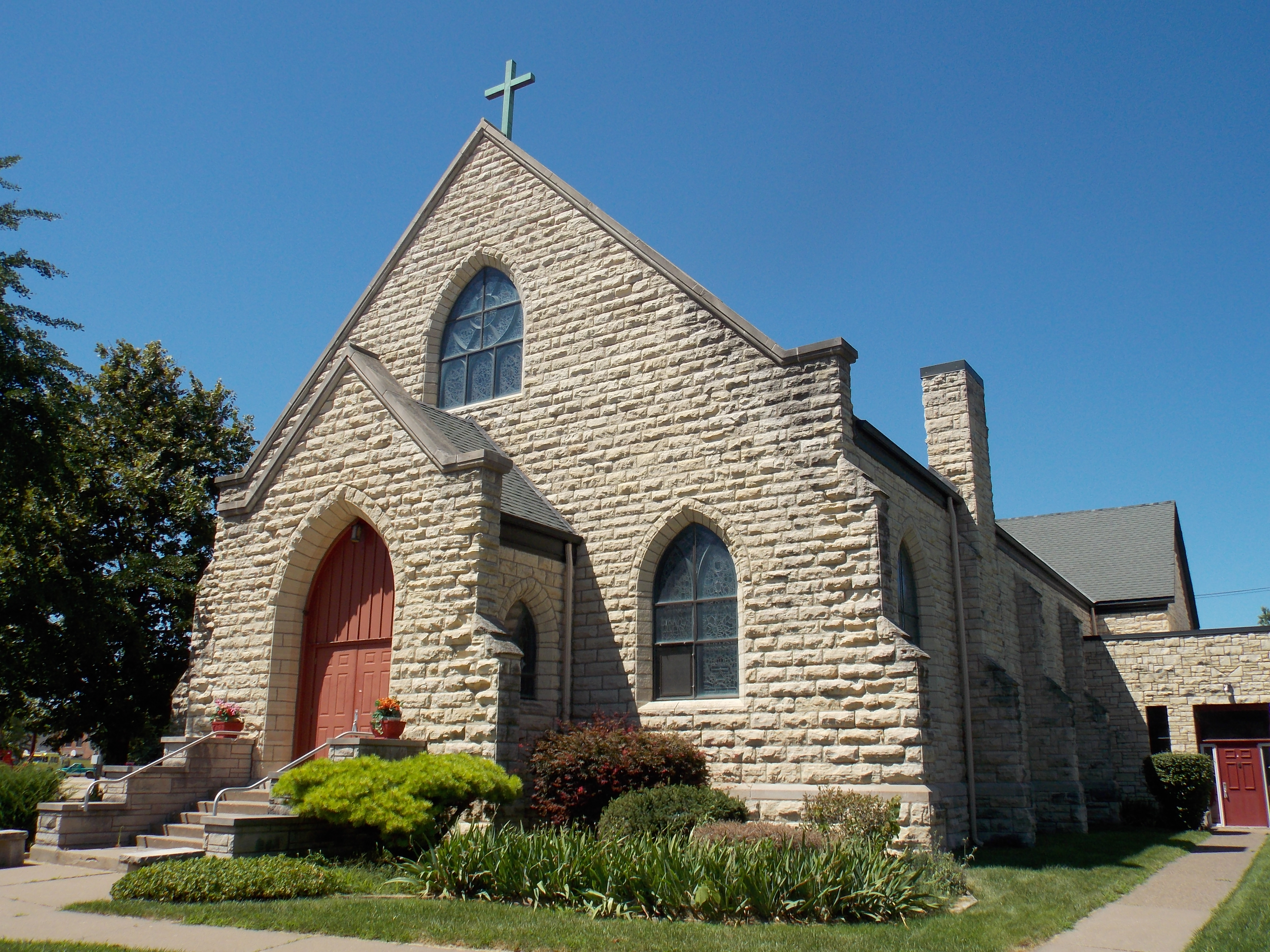
Bethel Church was restored and is now home to the Great Revivalist Brewery.

- The Bickelhaupt Arboretum is a non-profit arboretum with 14 acres of plant life
- Felix Adler Children's Discovery Center a non-profit children's center that helps children explore science, the arts and culture.
- Sawmill Museum is a family friendly Museum in north Clinton that teaches about the Lumber Industry and the History of Clinton.
- Clinton Area Showboat Theatre is a non-profit summer stock professional theatre run in an old steamboat on the edge of the Mississippi.
- Military Attractions, Clinton has a multitude of different Military Attractions to honor veterans from Clinton and the surrounding cities. These include the 9/11 Memorial, The Veterans Memorial, which is home to the famous Crunelle WWI Statue, the painted freedom rock, and the Hometown Hero Banners which are hung in the Historic Downtown every summer.
- Lumber Kings Baseball is a prospect league that plays on NelsonCorp Field in the City of Clinton Municipal Riverview Stadium on the Riverfront of Clinton.
- Lyons Farmers Market is held every Saturday and Wednesday at Lyons Four Square Park. This event brings in people from Clinton and surrounding areas to sell their produce and goods. The farmer's market is also home to a pavilion that goes over Roosevelt Road.
- Public Art has been a current trend within the city of Clinton. Different non-profit groups have been working to put up different murals and signage in Clinton. This trend has led to eight different murals as well as the "I Believe in Clinton", Campaign which is graphic signage. Additionally, the city has opened "The Grove", a pocket park used to display the work of local artists to the public.
- Clinton County Historical Society is a museum located in downtown Clinton. This museum is aimed at preserving the history of Clinton County as a whole, as well as the City of Clinton.
- Clinton has the 'First White Settler in Clinton County' Historical Marker.

== Transportation ==
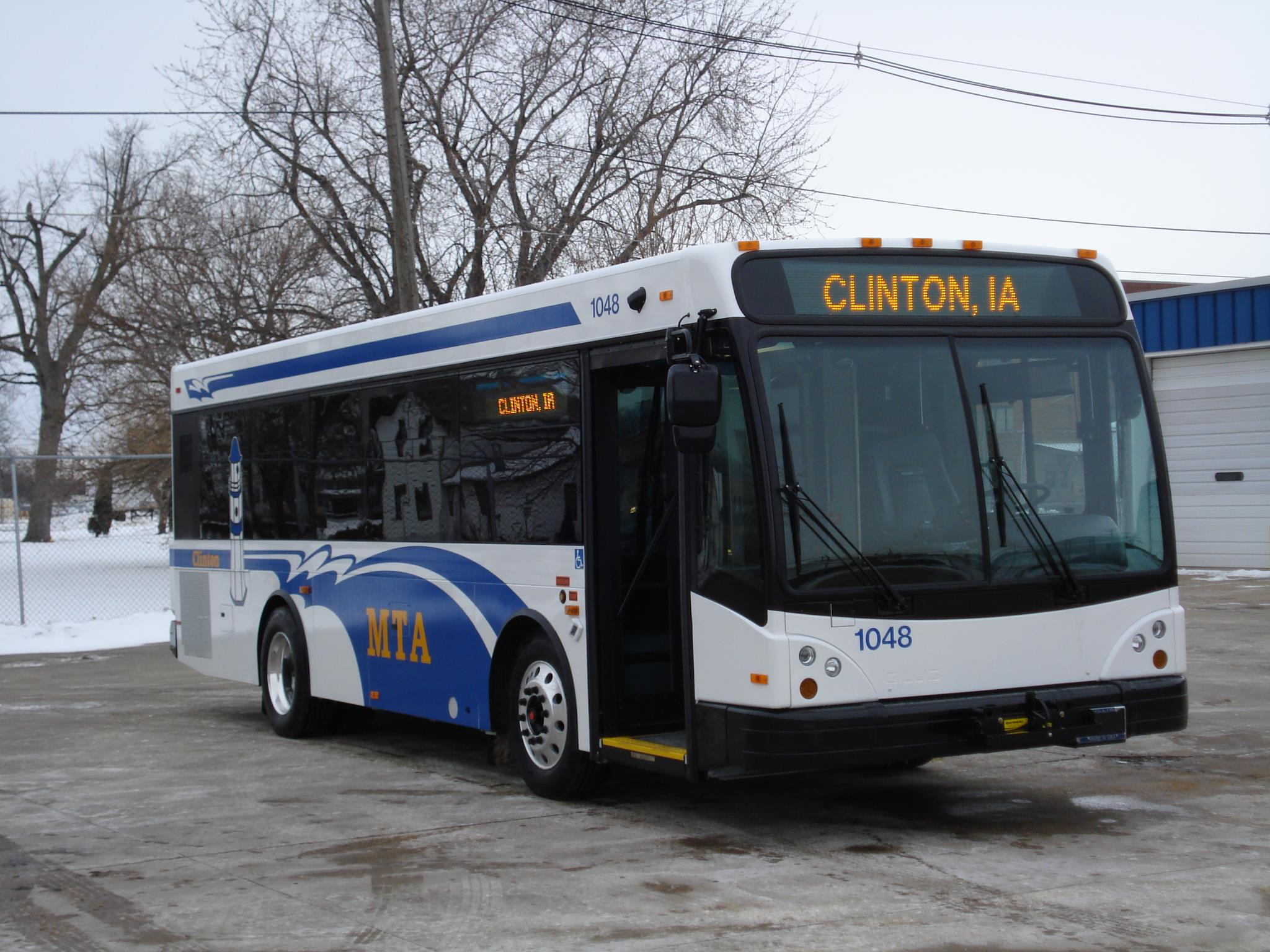
Clinton, Iowa MTA Bus 1048

U.S. Route 30 (Lincoln Highway), U.S. Route 67 (Great River Road), and Iowa Highway 136 pass through Clinton.

For air travel, the Quad City International Airport, which is about 40 miles away in Moline, Illinois, is the closest commercial airport and can be reached in less than one hour by car. Chicago's O'Hare International Airport is about 140 miles east, and can typically be reached in less than three hours by car.

Clinton has a municipal airport (Clinton Municipal Airport, KCWI) that serves the general aviation community. There are two runways, 3-21 which is 5,200' long, and 14-32 which is 3700' long. Numerous instrument approaches are available.

Major railroads include the Union Pacific Railroad's Overland Route and the Canadian Pacific.

A national U.S. recreation trail, the Mississippi River Trail passes through Clinton.

For intracity transit, residents can rely on the MTA's 6 bus routes that run throughout the city. Disabled residents can rely on the MTA's para-transit service.

== Education ==
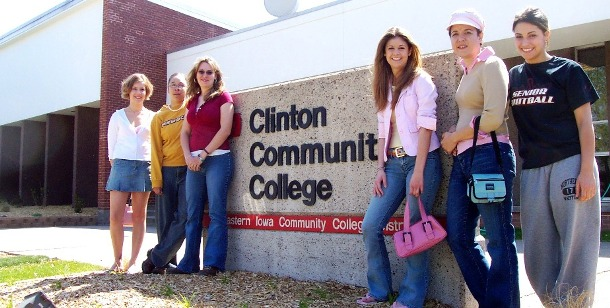
Students gather at the sign outside of the entrance to Clinton Community College, Iowa.

Prince of Peace Catholic Academy is a private Catholic K–12 school.

Unity Christian Schools is a private Christian K-12 school.

The Clinton Community School District is a public district home to many schools:

- Clinton High School
- Clinton Middle School
- Jefferson Elementary
- Whittier Elementary
- Eagle Heights Elementary
- Bluff Elementary

Gateway Area Community Center is an alternative high school for students who struggle to learn in a regular classroom.

The Lighthouse School is a boarding and computer-based self-learning program.

Eastern Iowa Community Colleges also has a branch, Clinton Community College

== Religion ==
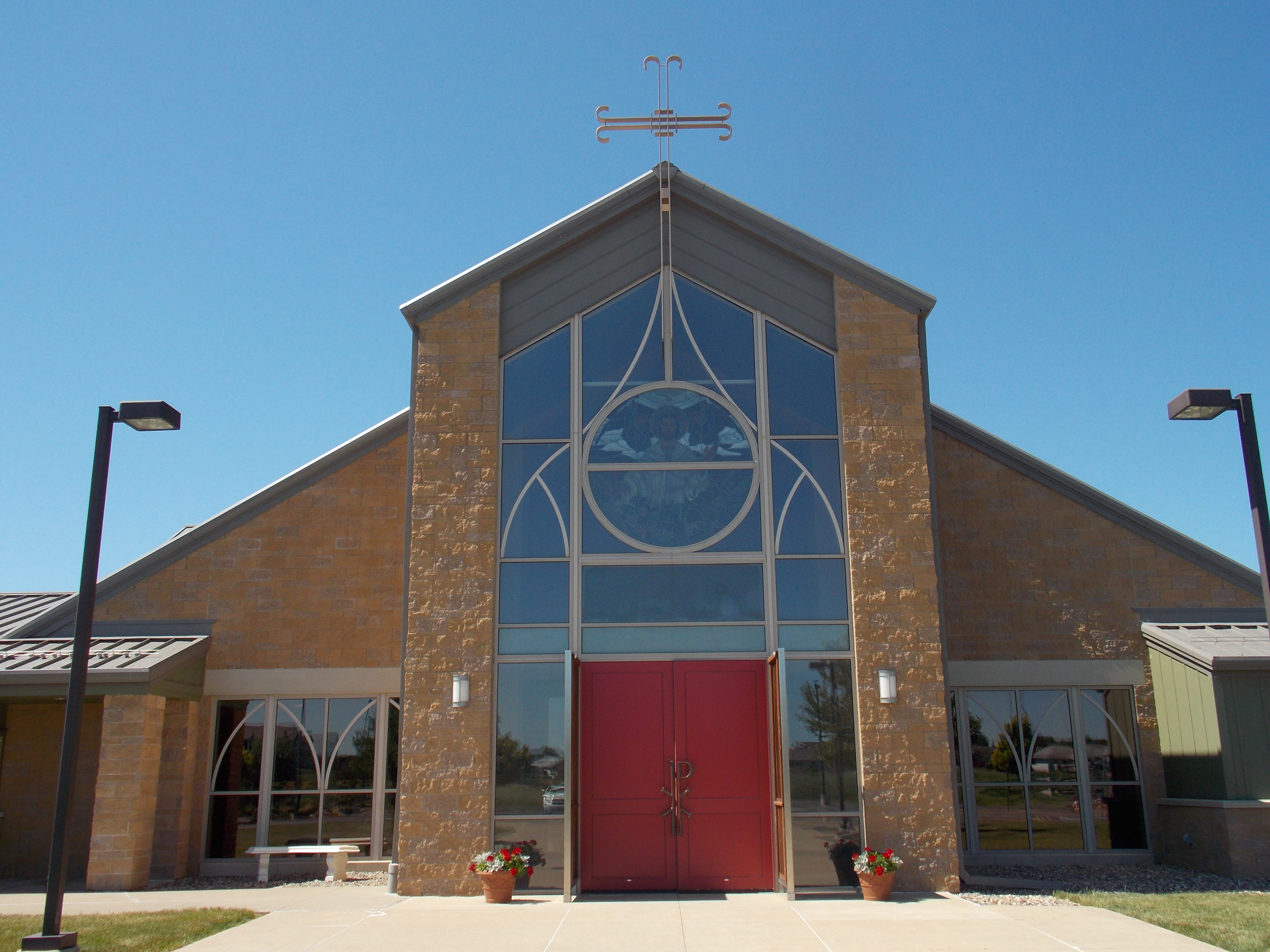
Jesus Christ Prince of Peace

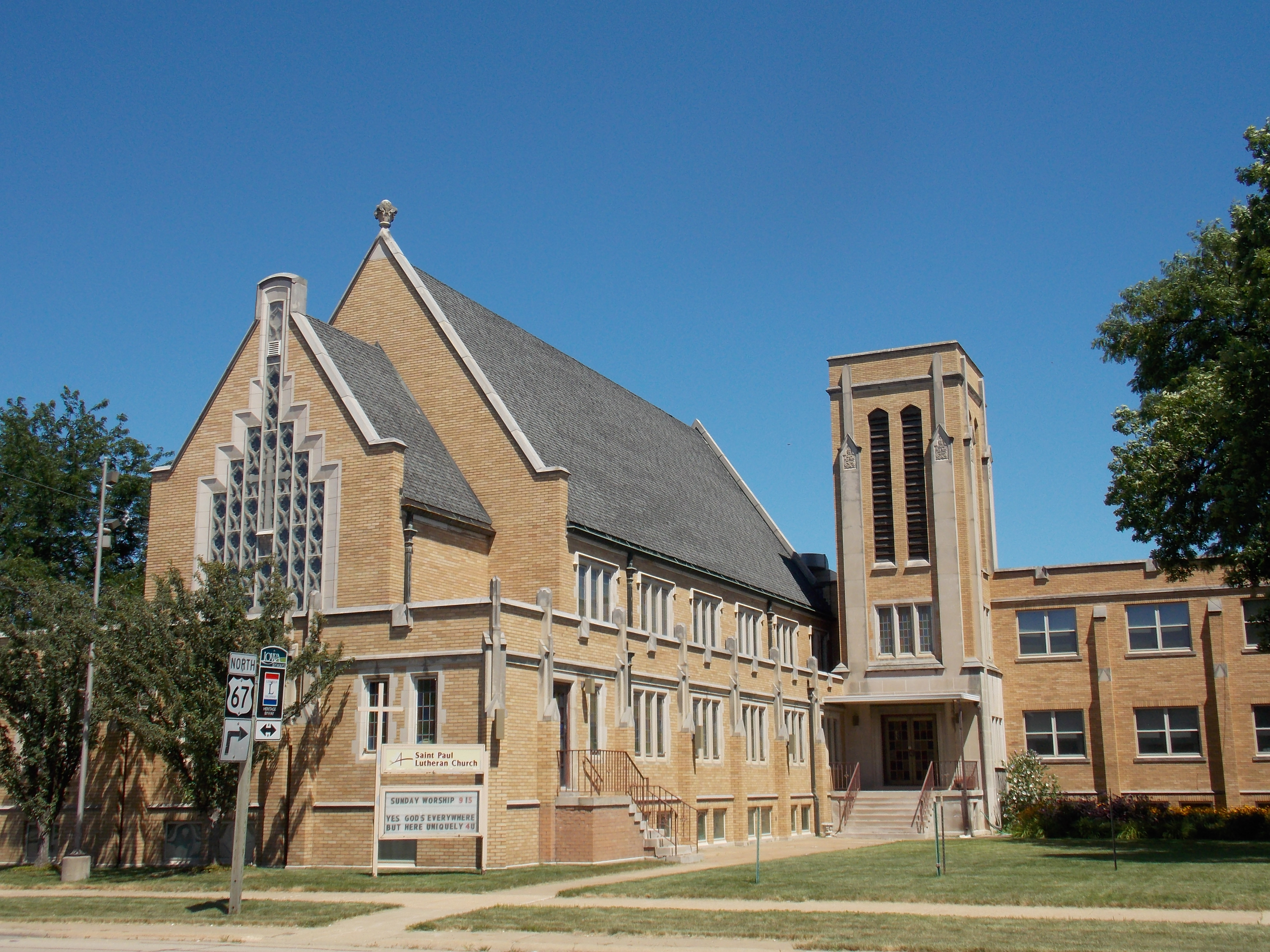
Saint Paul Lutheran Church

Note: These are just a few of the many churches in Clinton.

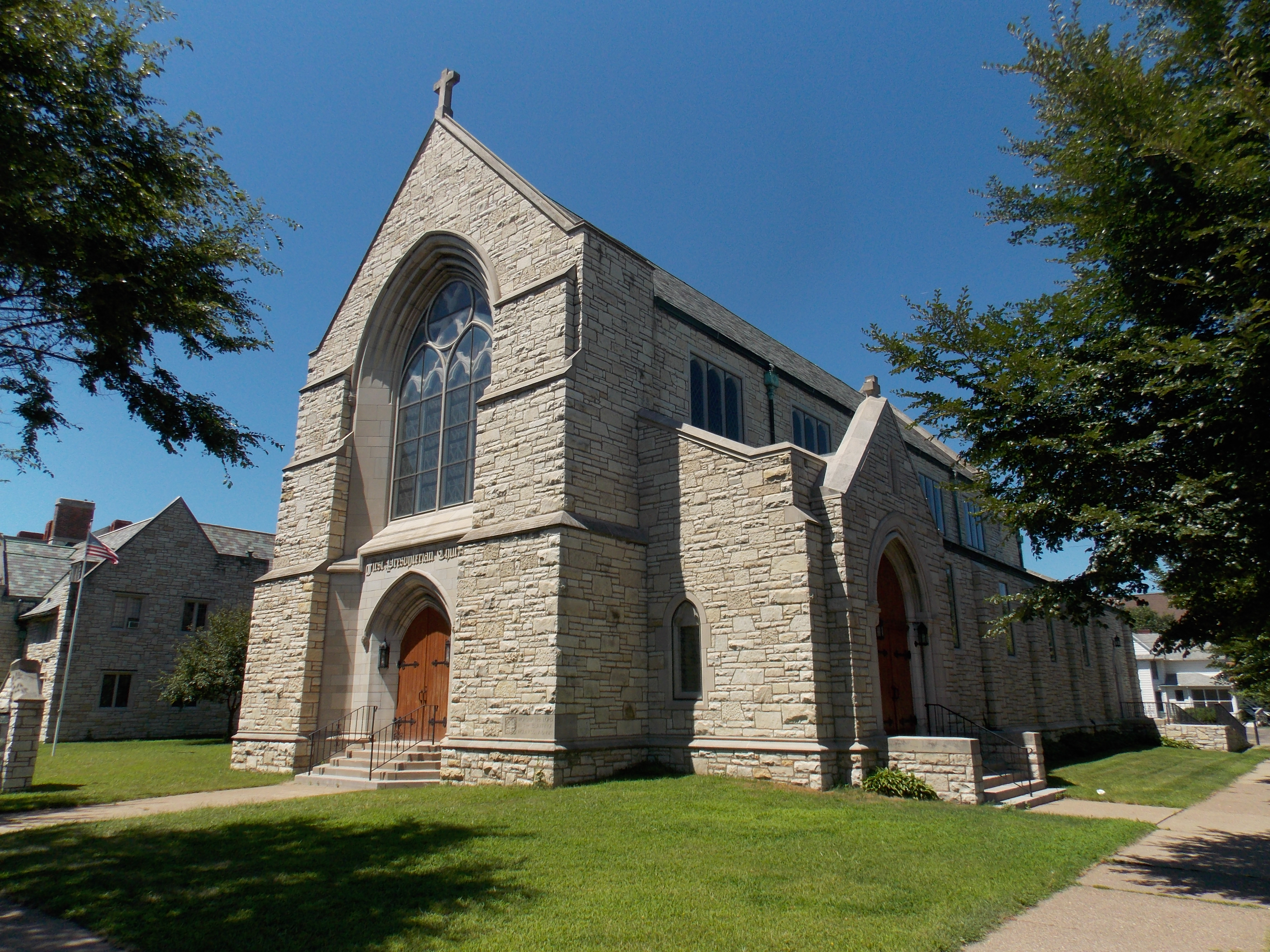
First United Presbyterian Church

Catholic Church

- Jesus Christ, Prince of Peace Catholic Parish

Lutheran Churches

- St. Paul Lutheran Church
- Faith Center Church
- Trinity Lutheran Church
- Zion Evangelical Lutheran Church
- St. John Lutheran Church

LDS

- Church Of Jesus Christ of Latter-Day Saints

Non-denominational Christian Churches

- Journey
- River Church

Baptist Church

- Gateway Baptist Church
- Calvary Baptist Church
- First Baptist Church

Islamic Mosque

- Clinton Islamic Center

Methodist Church

- First Methodist Church

== Culture and institutions ==
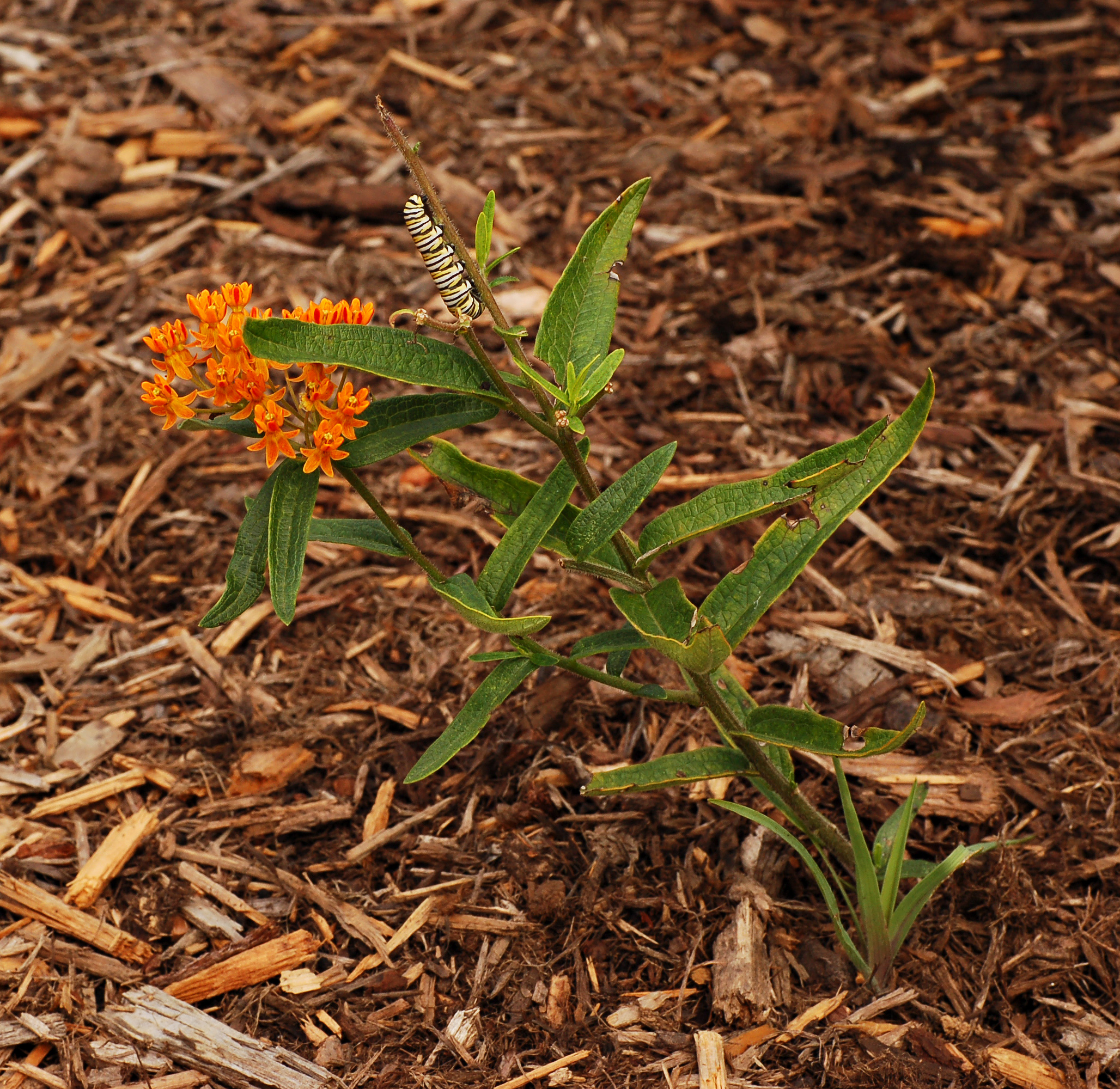
The Bickelhaupt Arboretum is home to many species of bugs and plants.

- Bickelhaupt Arboretum 340 S. 14th St.
- Clinton Area Showboat Theatre, 311 Riverview Drive, Clinton
- Felix Adler Discovery Center, 332 8th Ave S, Clinton
- The Clinton County Historical Society, 601 South 1st Street, Clinton
- The Sawmill Museum, 2231 Grant Street, Clinton
- The Soaring Eagle Nature Center, 3923 North 3rd Street, Clinton
- The Clinton Symphony Orchestra, performing at the Vernon Cook Theater at Clinton High School

== Architecture ==
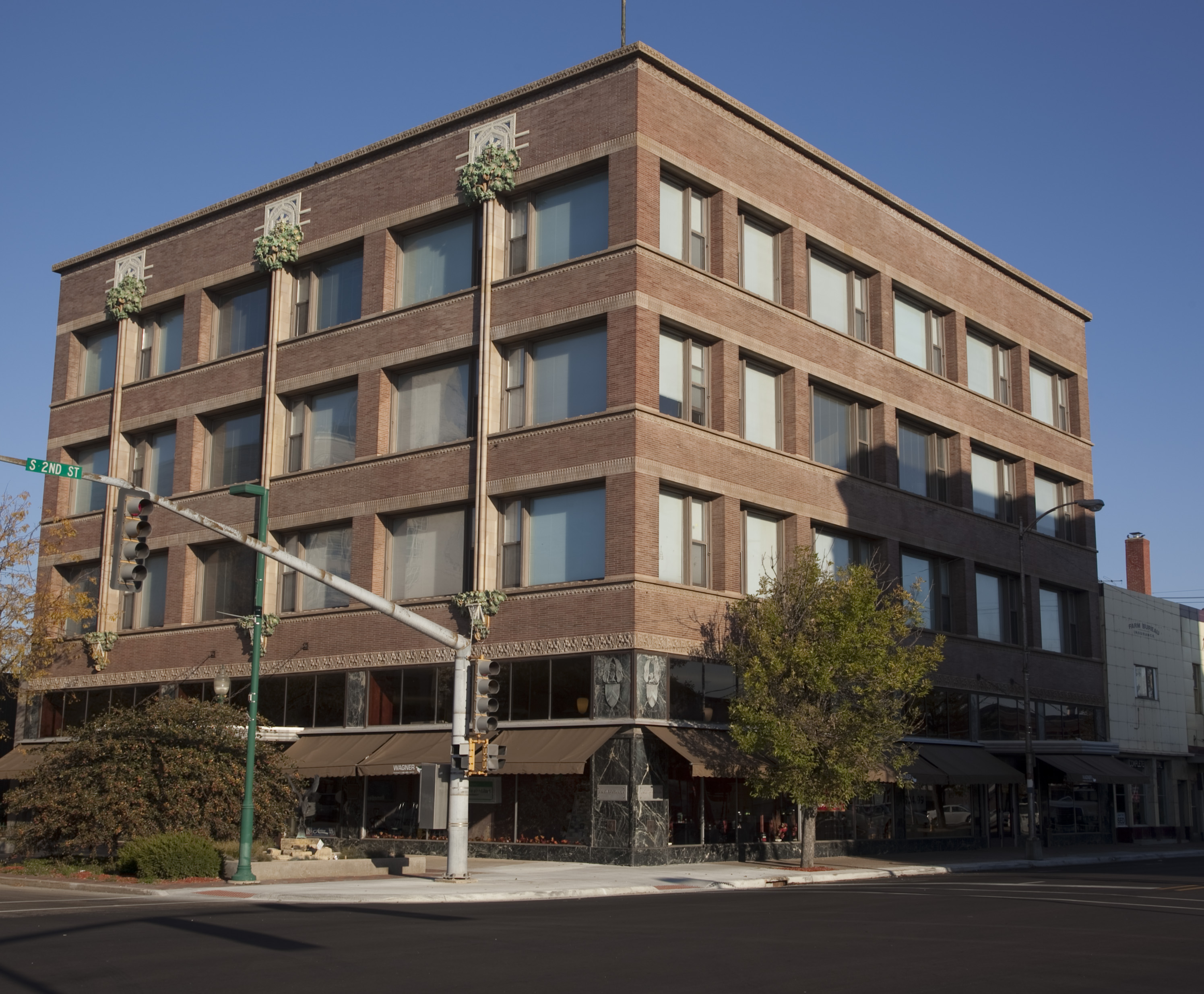
The Van Allen Building, National Historic Landmark

National Historic Landmark:

- The Van Allen Building, a National Historic Landmark designed by Louis Sullivan, was completed in 1914.The Van Allen Building is currently a commercial and residential space located in Downtown Clinton. The Van Allen Building was added to the National Historic Landmarks in 1976.

Buildings on the National Register of Historic Places:

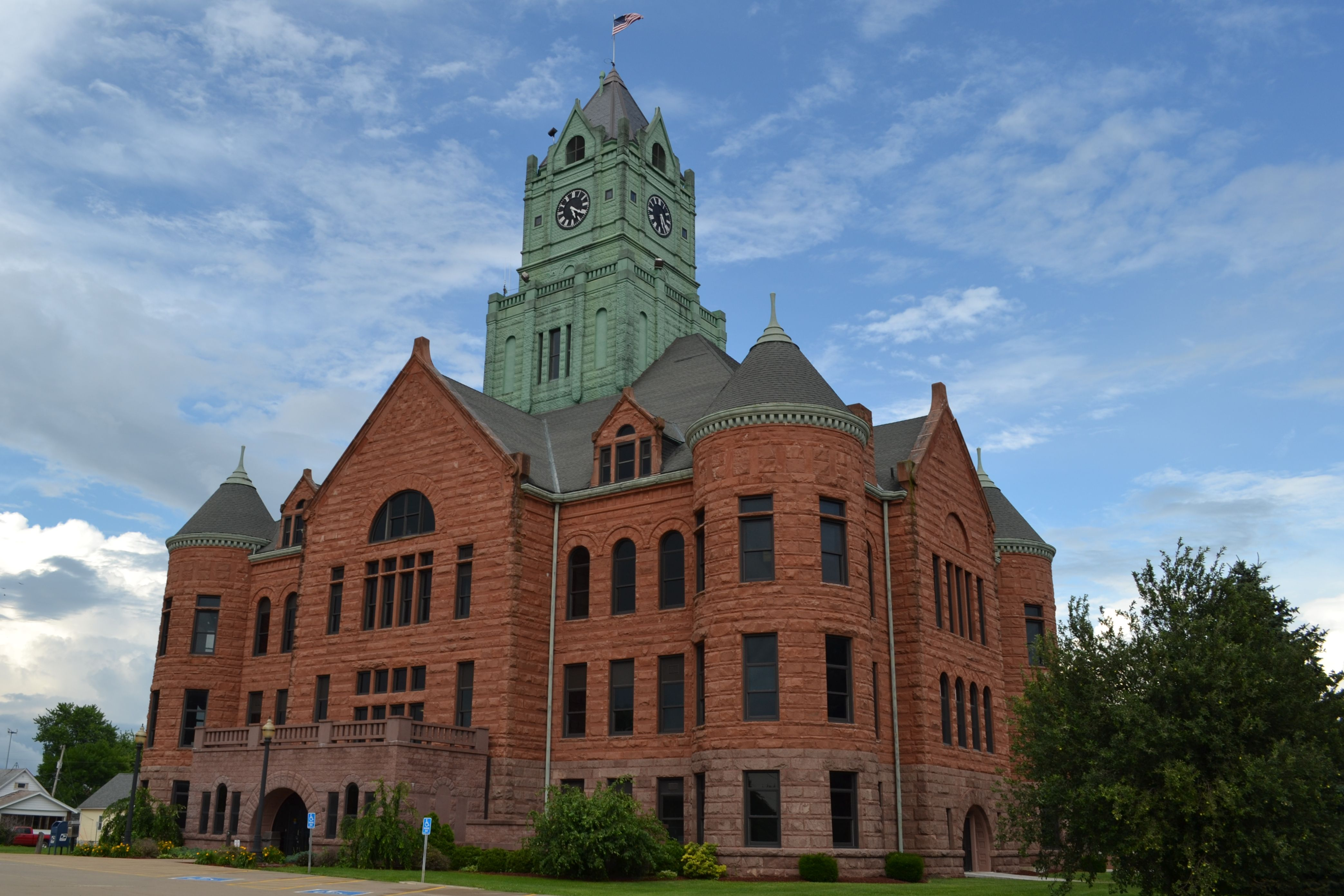
The Clinton County Courthouse, National Register of Historic Places

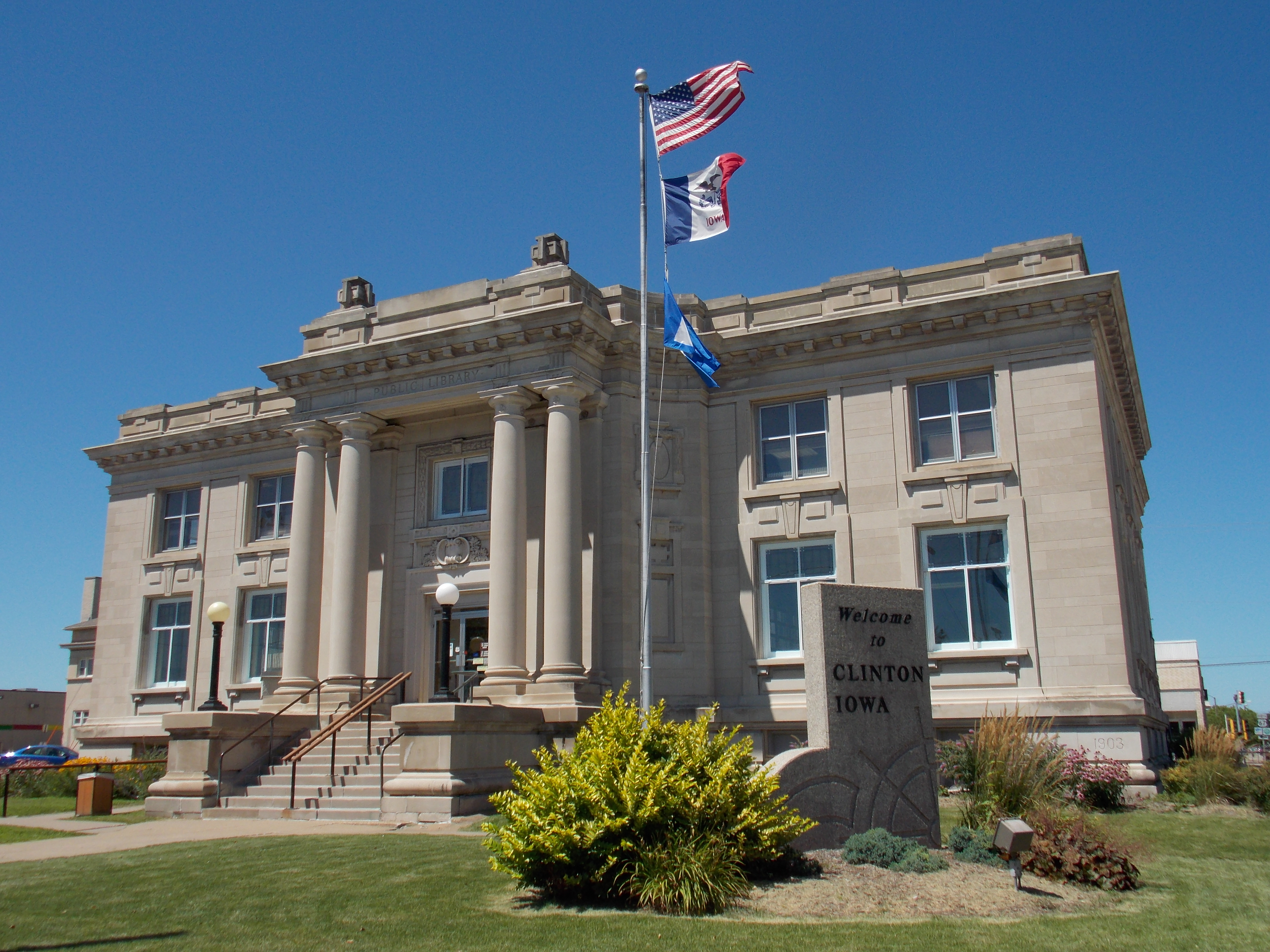
Clinton Public Library, National Register of Historic Places

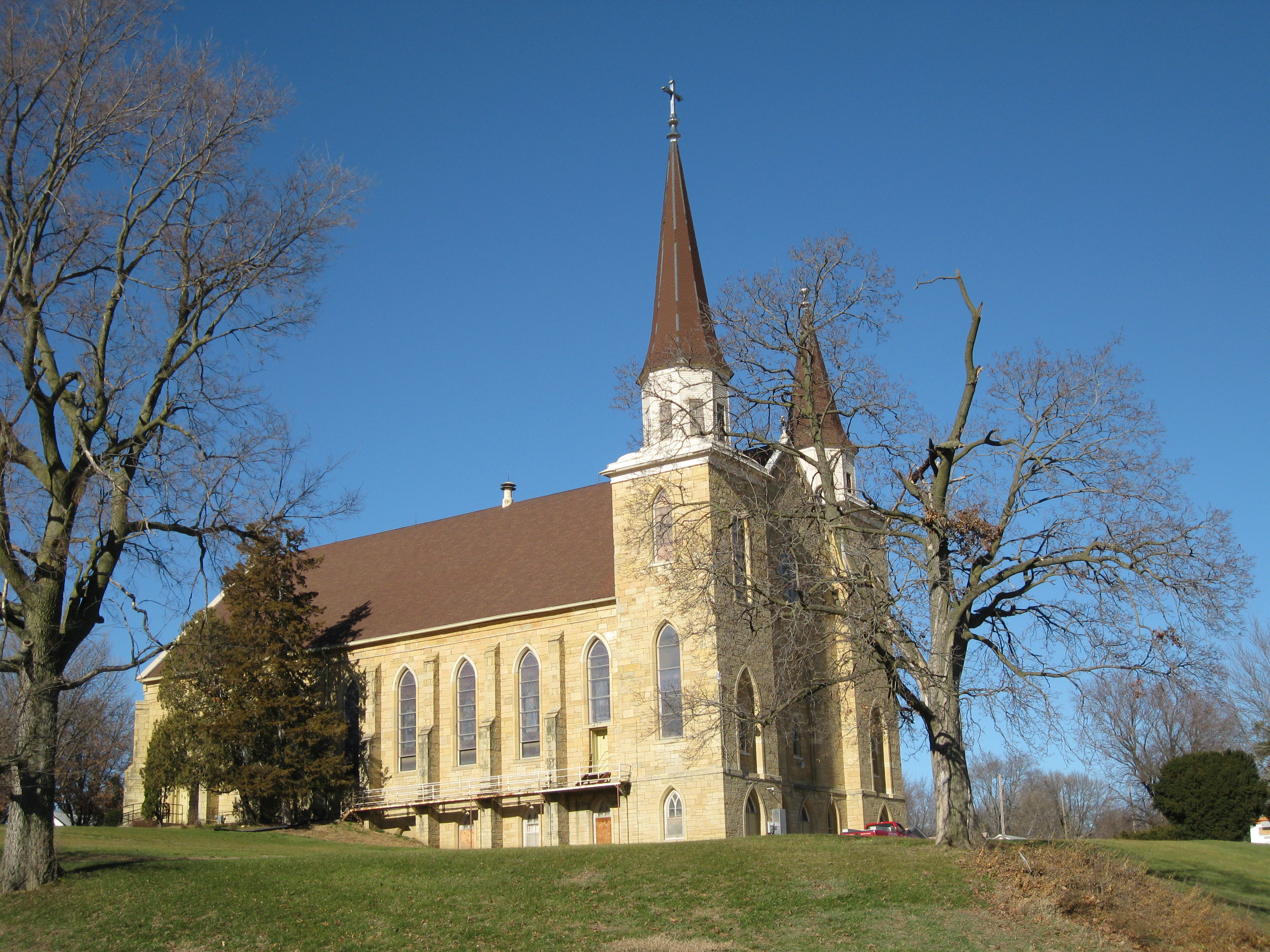
St. Irenaeus Church, National Register of Historic Places

- Clinton County Courthouse, constructed from 1892 to 1897 by architects Stanley Mansfield and Josiah Rice in Romanesque Revival style. Exterior walls are of red sandstone and granite and the tower is of copper which has weathered to a bright green color. Noted architect Claire Allen from Jackson, Michigan also worked on this building. The Clinton County Courthouse was added to the National Register of Historic Places in 1981.
- Clinton Public Library, financed by Andrew Carnegie and built 1903–1904 from the design of the Chicago architectural firm of Patton & Miller. Beaux Arts Neoclassica; style with a monumental entry with processional steps and flanking paired columns. Symmetry of design and borrowings of Greek and Roman inspired elements complete the composition. Exterior walls of cut and dressed limestone. The Clinton Public Library was added to the National Register of Historic Places in 1983.
- Lafayette Lamb House (YWCA), constructed in 1877 by architect W.W. Sanborn and rebuilt in 1906. Originally built in the Second Empire style, the 1906 'modernization' converted it to more of the Georgian Revival style. The Lafayette Lamb House was added to the National Register of Historic Places in 1979.
- City National Bank (First National Bank), designed by John Morrell & Son in the Neoclassical style and constructed in 1911–1912. City National Bank was added to the National Register of Historic Places in 1985.
- Howes Building, constructed in 1900 for Edward Madison Howes by architect Josiah Rice in Renaissance Revival style, featuring engaged pilasters with Ionic capitals. The exterior street facades of the building are of red face brick with decorative accents of red terracotta. The fourth floor added in 1905 by architect John Morrell. The Howes Building was added to the National Register of Historic Places in 2004.
- Ankeny Building, constructed in 1930, designed by Chicago architect Harold Holmes in "Moderne" or Art Deco style. The building street facades are clad with cream-colored terracotta panels. Today, this building is home to many commercial businesses. The Ankeny Building was added to the National Register of Historic Places in 2006.
- Moeszinger-Marquis (Armstrong) Building, designed by Josiah Rice and constructed in 1891 by William Bentley for the Clinton Produce Company. In 1907 the Baldwin Bros. acquired the building for its wholesale hardware business, which in turn passed to its successor company, the Moeszinger-Marquis Hardware Company in 1912. In 1941 the building was acquired by R.W. Armstrong, who also conducted a wholesale hardware business from the premises. The Armstrong Building was added to the National Register of Historic Places in 2006.
- George M. Curtis Mansion (Women's Club), constructed in Queen Anne style in 1883–1884. The Mansion contains more than forty stained glass windows, carved banisters, ornate wood trim, and massive fireplaces. Curtis Mansion was added to the National Register of Historic Places in 1979.
- Castle Terrace Historic District, Originally platted in 1892. The project was a promotional effort to show developers, architects, and builders the application and products of the Curtis Company. The architectural design is highly eclectic, with Tudor Gothic the primary style utilized. Castle Terrace Historic District was added to the National Register of Historic Places in 1998.
- Cherry Bank, Built 1870–1871, the Dr. A.L. Ankeny/Lindmeier/Cottral house is two stories high with walls of red brick with buff-colored brick used for quoins at the corners and for the window arches. A cornice, hip roof, and widow's walk cap the building. Cherry Bank was added to the National Register of Historic Places in 1999.
- Saint Irenaeus Church, was designed by W.W. Sanborn and was constructed from 1864 to 1871. It was constructed in the Gothic Revival Style. Saint Irenaeus was added to the National Register of Historic Places in 2010.

== Notable people ==
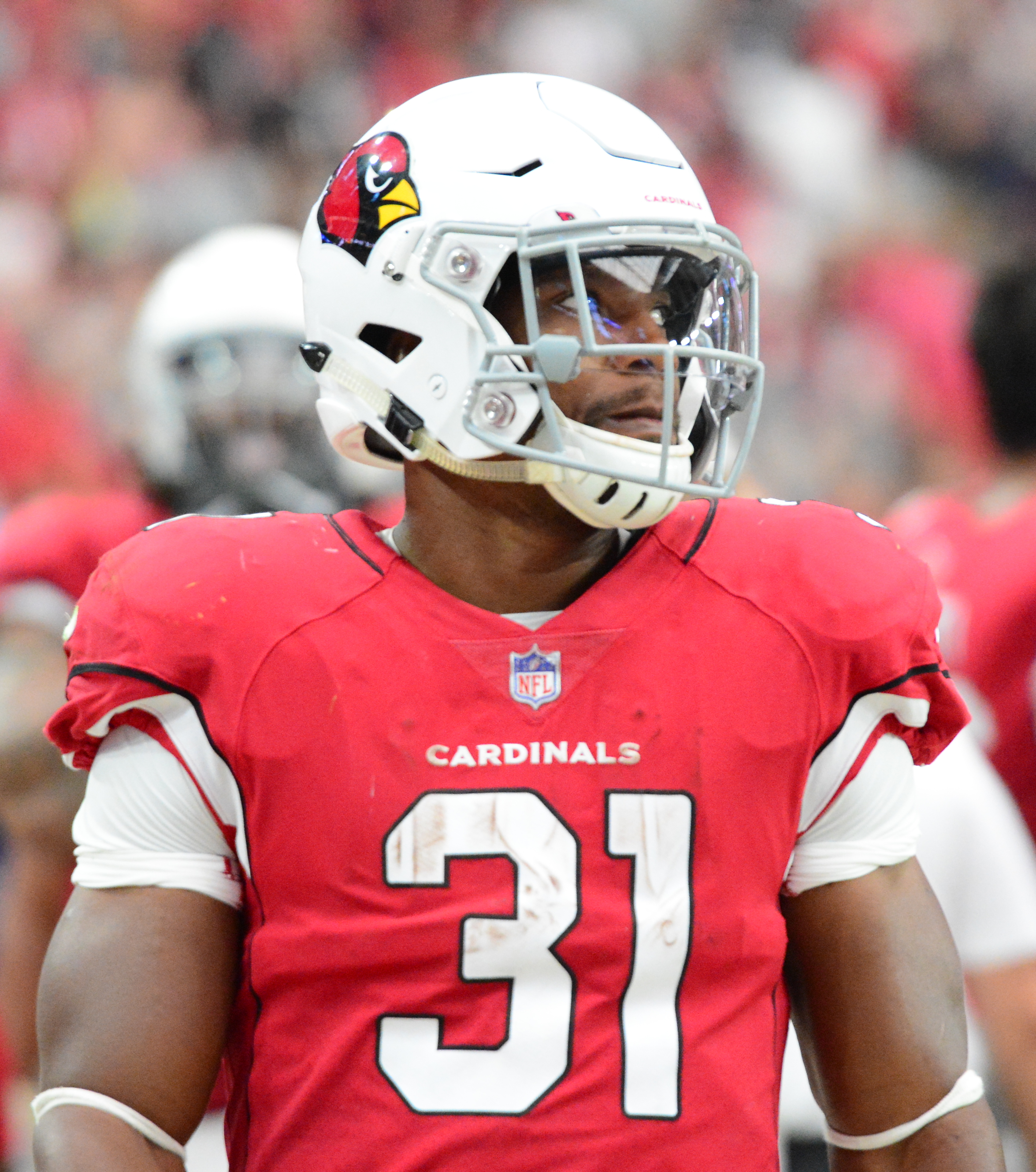
NFL player David Johnson

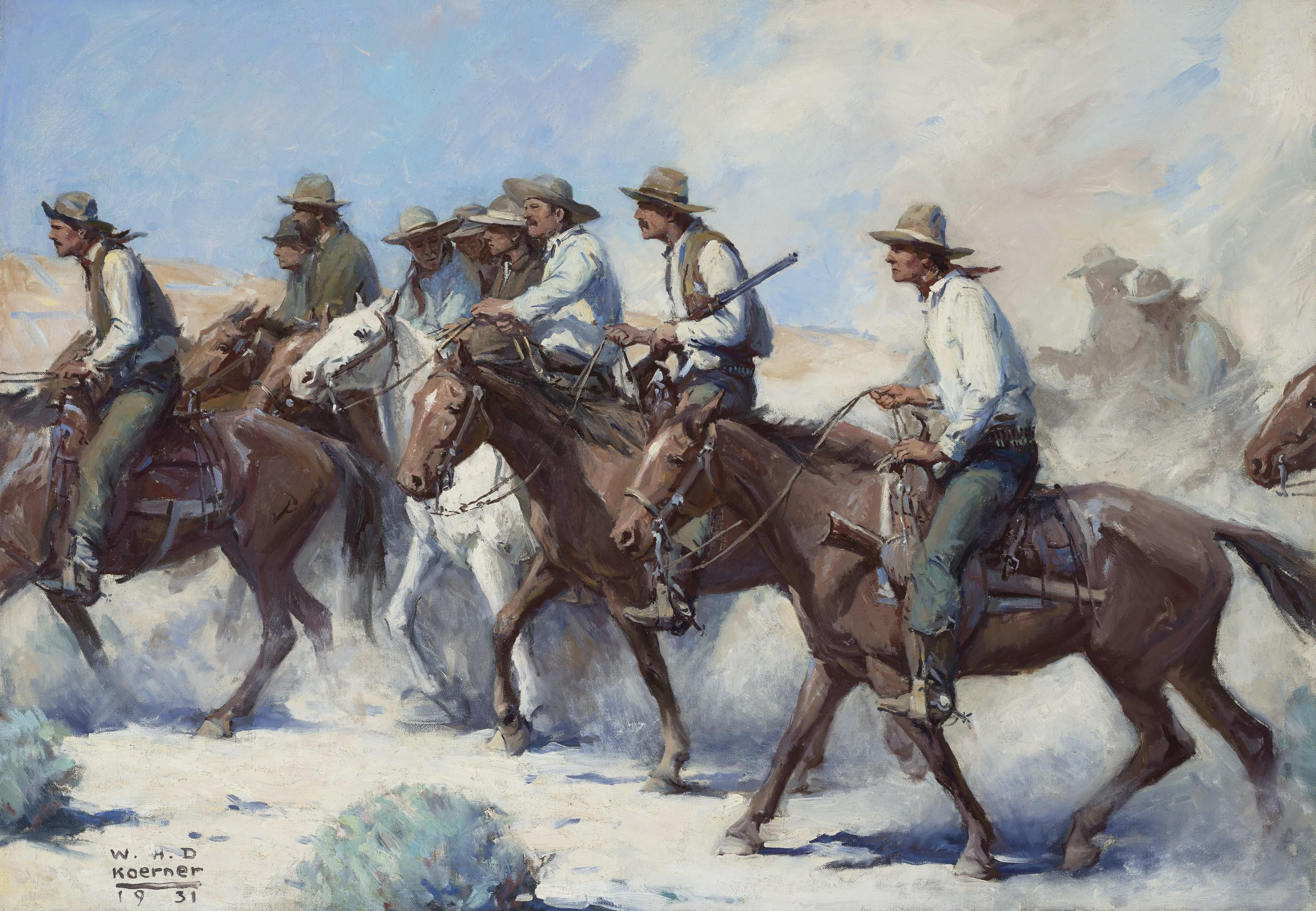
The Posse by W.H.D. Koerner, 1931

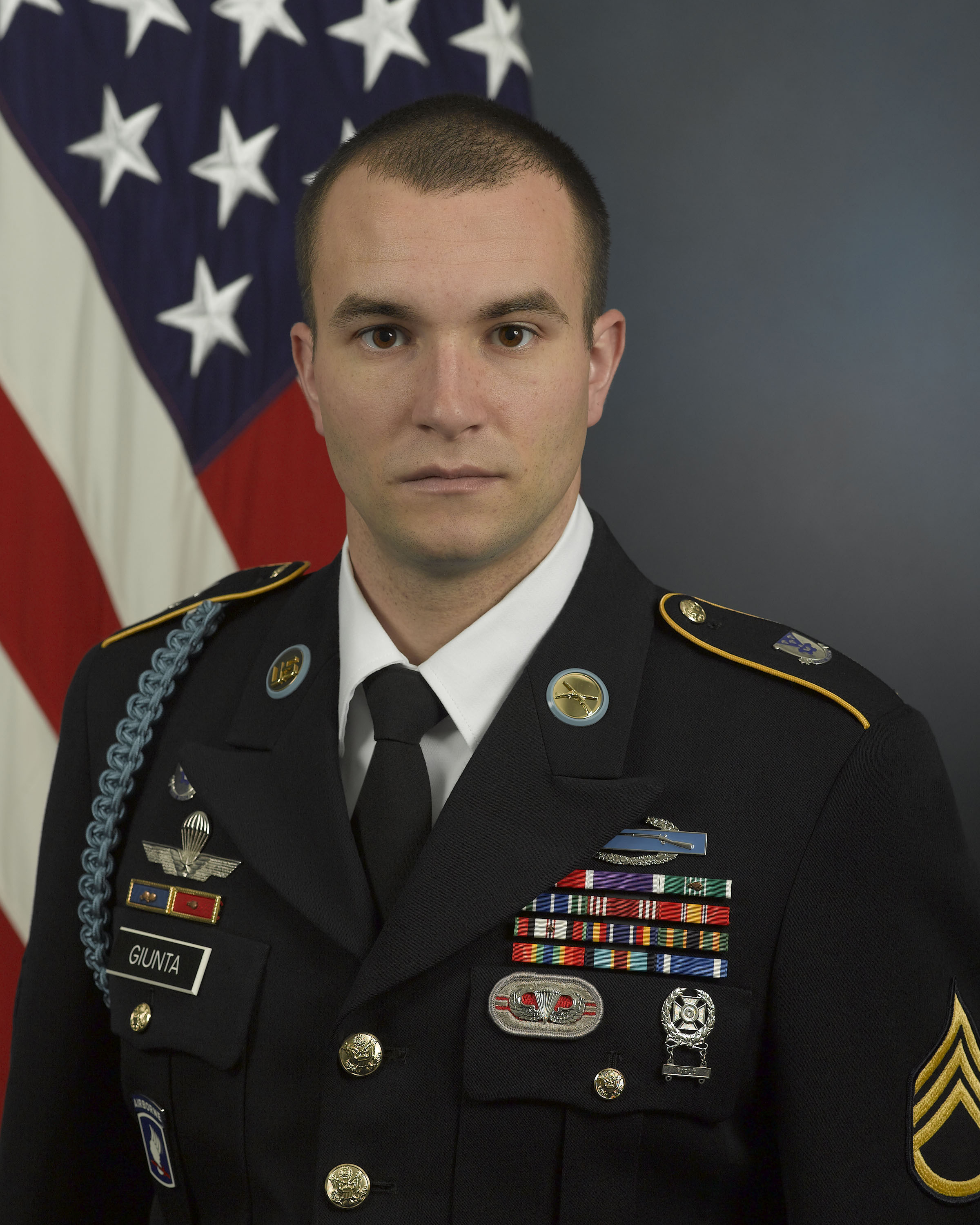
Salvatore Giunta portrait

- Felix Adler (1895–1960), "King of Clowns", Ringling Brothers Circus
- Matt Bentley, professional wrestler for Total Nonstop Action Wrestling
- Harriet Frances Carpenter (1868/75 – 1956), educator, writer, suffragist
- Marquis Childs (1903–1990), Pulitzer Prize-winning columnist
- William Durward Connor (1874–1960), former Superintendent of the United States Military Academy
- Muriel Frances Dana (1916–1997), child actress who appeared in silent films
- Tom Determann (born 1950), member of the Iowa House of Representatives
- Robert Drouet (1870–1914), actor and playwright
- Pat Flanagan (1893–1943), sportscaster for Major League Baseball in Chicago
- Judith Ellen Foster (1840–1910), early feminist, known as "The Iowa Lawyer"
- Dale Gardner (1948–2014), NASA astronaut
- Artemus Gates (1895–1976), World War I hero, banker, Assistant Secretary of the Navy for Air during World War II
- Salvatore Giunta, Staff Sergeant, U.S. Army, first living recipient of the Medal of Honor since the Vietnam War.
- Col. David Hilmers, former NASA Astronaut
- Robert Bruce Horsfall (1869–1948), artist and author of multiple wildlife books
- Bernhard M. Jacobsen (1862–1936), U.S. Congressman
- William S. Jacobsen (1887–1955), U.S. Congressman
- David Johnson, running back, University of Northern Iowa and Arizona Cardinals
- Lulu Johnson (1907–1995), the second African-American woman in the U.S. to earn a Ph.D., Johnson County Iowa is a namesake
- David Joyce (1825–1904), lumber baron, industrialist
- Rachelle Keck, president of Grand View University and Briar Cliff University
- W. H. D. Koerner (1878–1938), artist of over 2,000 published illustrations, as well as a painting that was hung in the office of President W. Bush
- Otto Kraushaar (1901–1989), Professor at Smith College, 6th president of Goucher College
- Chancy Lamb (1816–1897), lumber baron, industrialist
- Larry Mac Duff, football player, head coach, and defensive coordinator
- Denise McCann, singer-songwriter
- Beth Marion (1912–2003), B-movie actress of the 1930s
- George E. Martin (1902–1995), US Army major general, born in Clinton
- Peggy Moran (1918–2002), film actress
- Stephen Paddock (1953–2017), perpetrator of the 2017 Las Vegas shooting
- Allen E. Paulson (1922–2000), businessman, former owner of Gulfstream Aerospace
- Charles Pelton (born 1940), politician
- Ken Ploen, football player, Rose Bowl Hall of Fame, Canadian Football Hall of Fame
- Dan Roushar, American Football Coach, New Orleans Saints, Tulane
- Lillian Russell (1861–1922), singer and actress in comic operas
- Duke Slater (1898–1966), All-American college football player, First black lineman in NFL history, Served as a municipal judge for Chicago, Second African- American Judge in city history
- George Stone (1876–1945), Major League Baseball AL batting title champion
- William Theisen, founder of Godfather's Pizza
- John Delbert Van Allen (1850–1928), dry goods merchant, department store owner
- Krista Voda, sportscaster, Fox Sports, SPEED Channel
- Colonel Russell W. Volckmann (1911–1982), West Point graduate, leader of guerrilla resistance in the Philippines
- LaMetta Wynn (1933–2021), first African-American elected as mayor of an Iowa municipality
- W. J. Young (1827–1896), lumber baron, industrialist

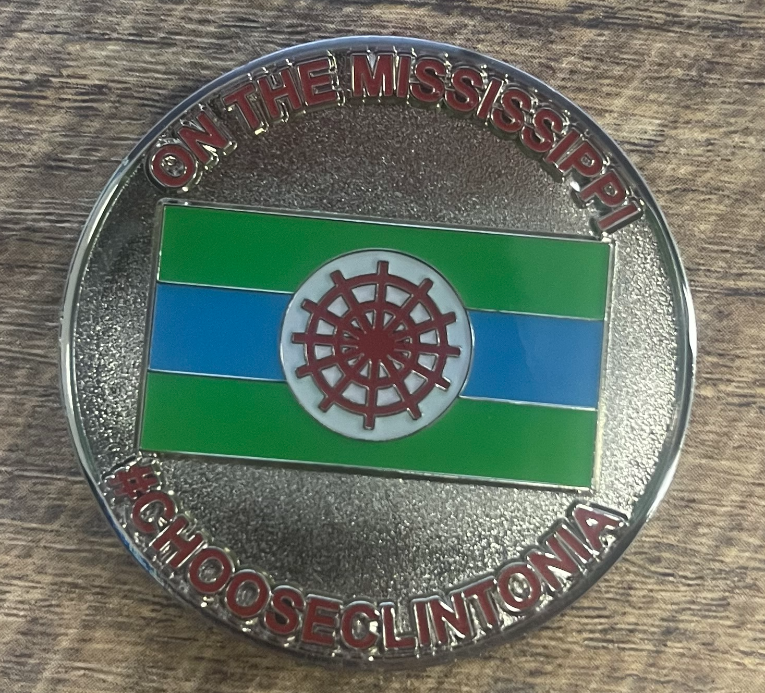
Back of City Coin of Clinton, Iowa

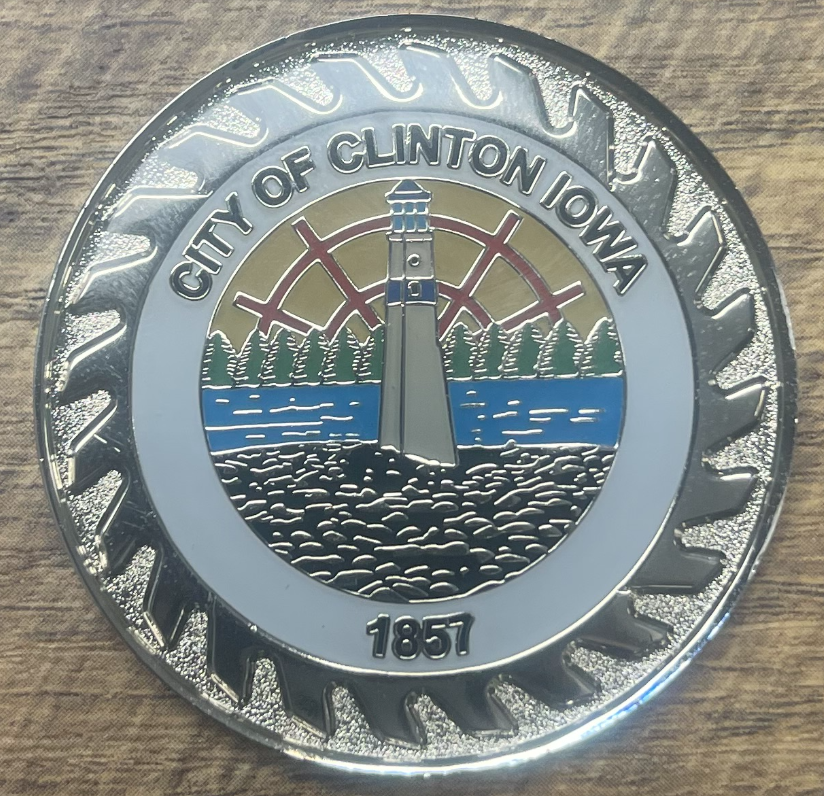
Front of City Coin of Clinton, Iowa

== Notable businesses, past and present ==
- Gray & Lunt, 1857, saw mills and lumber concerns
- Claussen, Thornburg & Smith, c. 1866, a small sash and door factory
- Curtis Bros. & Co, George M. and Charles F. Curtis, 1866–1966, producer of general house finishings
- C. Lamb & Sons, Chancy Lamb, Artemus Lamb, Lafayette Lamb, c. 1874-?, saw mills and lumber concerns
- Van Allen and Company Department Store, c. 1912–1914, in the Van Allen Building
- Flav's Fried Chicken, 2011, a former restaurant cofounded by Flavor Flav
- ADM, Archer-Daniels-Midland, (1982–Present) a food processing corporation
- Atlas Roofing Corporation, (Present) manufactures hardware equipment
- Big River Packaging, (Present) designs and manufactures paperboard packaging
- Clinton LumberKings, (Present) a collegiate summer baseball team of the Prospect League
- Custom-Pak, (Present) manufactures industrial blow-molded parts
- LyondellBasell, (Present) develops and supplies a multitude of products
- Nestle Purina, (Present) manufactures pet and farm animal products
- Timken, (Present) manufactures transmission products
