= First National Bank (Clinton, Iowa) =

- U.S. National Register of Historic Places
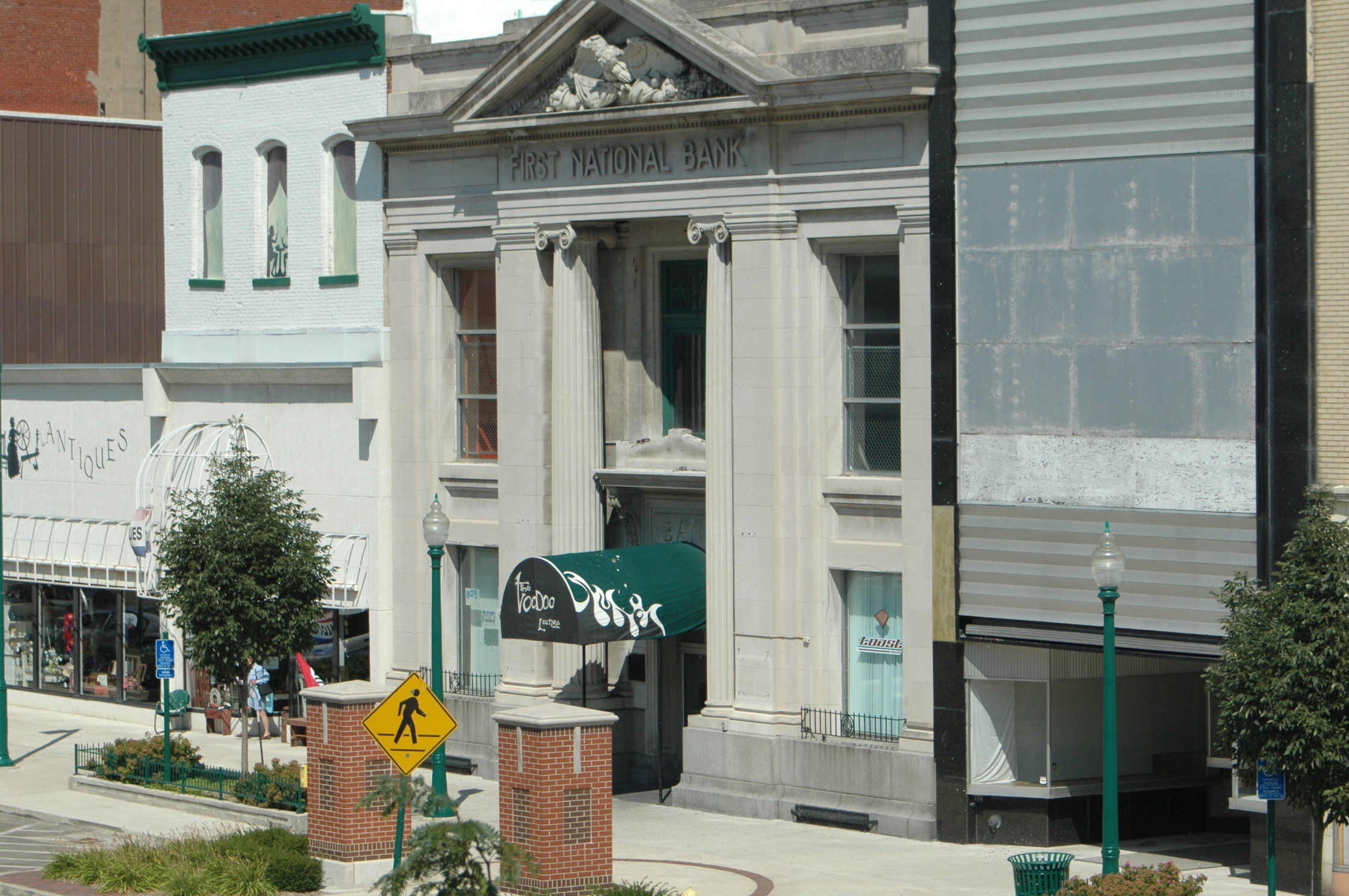

- Location within Iowa Location within the United States
- Location: 226 5th Ave., S. Clinton, Iowa
- Coordinates: 41°50′28″N 90°11′21″W
- Built: 1912
- Architect: A.H. Morrell
- Architectural style: Classical Revival
- NRHP reference No.: 85003007
- Added to NRHP: October 10, 1985

First National Bank is a historic structure located in downtown Clinton, Iowa, United States. Clinton architect A.H. Morrell designed the building in the Classical Revival style. It was built by Daniel Haring from 1911 to 1912. The two-story structure features a pediment and fluted columns flanking the main entrance. The exterior is composed of dressed stone and is 50 feet (15 m) wide. It was listed on the National Register of Historic Places in 1985.
