= George M. Curtis House =

Historic house in Iowa, United States

- U.S. National Register of Historic Places
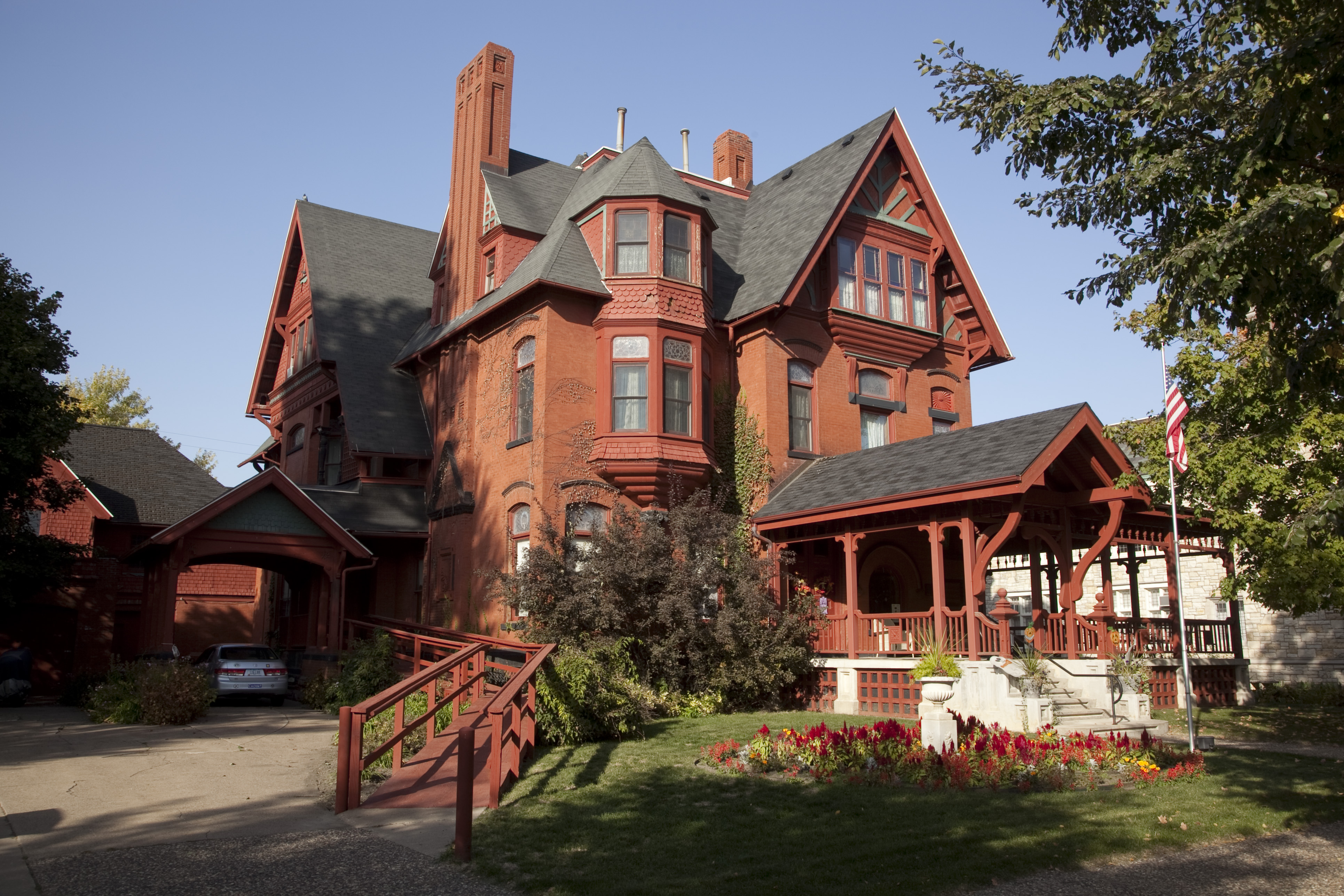

- Location within Iowa Location within the United States
- Location: 420 S. 5th Ave., Clinton, Iowa
- Coordinates: 41°50′29″N 90°11′40″W
- Area: less than one acre
- Built: 1883
- Architectural style: Late Victorian
- NRHP reference No.: 79000892
- Added to NRHP: October 1, 1979

The George M. Curtis House is a historic house located at 420 South 5th Avenue in Clinton, Iowa.

== Description and history ==
The Late Victorian style home was built for industrialist George M. Curtis in 1883. It was purchased by the Clinton Woman's Club in 1925 and they continue to maintain the building. The three-story home is composed of brick veneer and features a variety of roof planes and windows. The original lacy wood porch was replaced by the current semi-circular porch in the 1940s. The main floor highlights various types of lumber throughout each room and it is reported that Mr. Curtis used his home as a sort of portfolio for his lumber business.

It was listed on the National Register of Historic Places on October 1, 1979.
