= Cherry Bank =

Historic house in Iowa, United States

- U.S. National Register of Historic Places
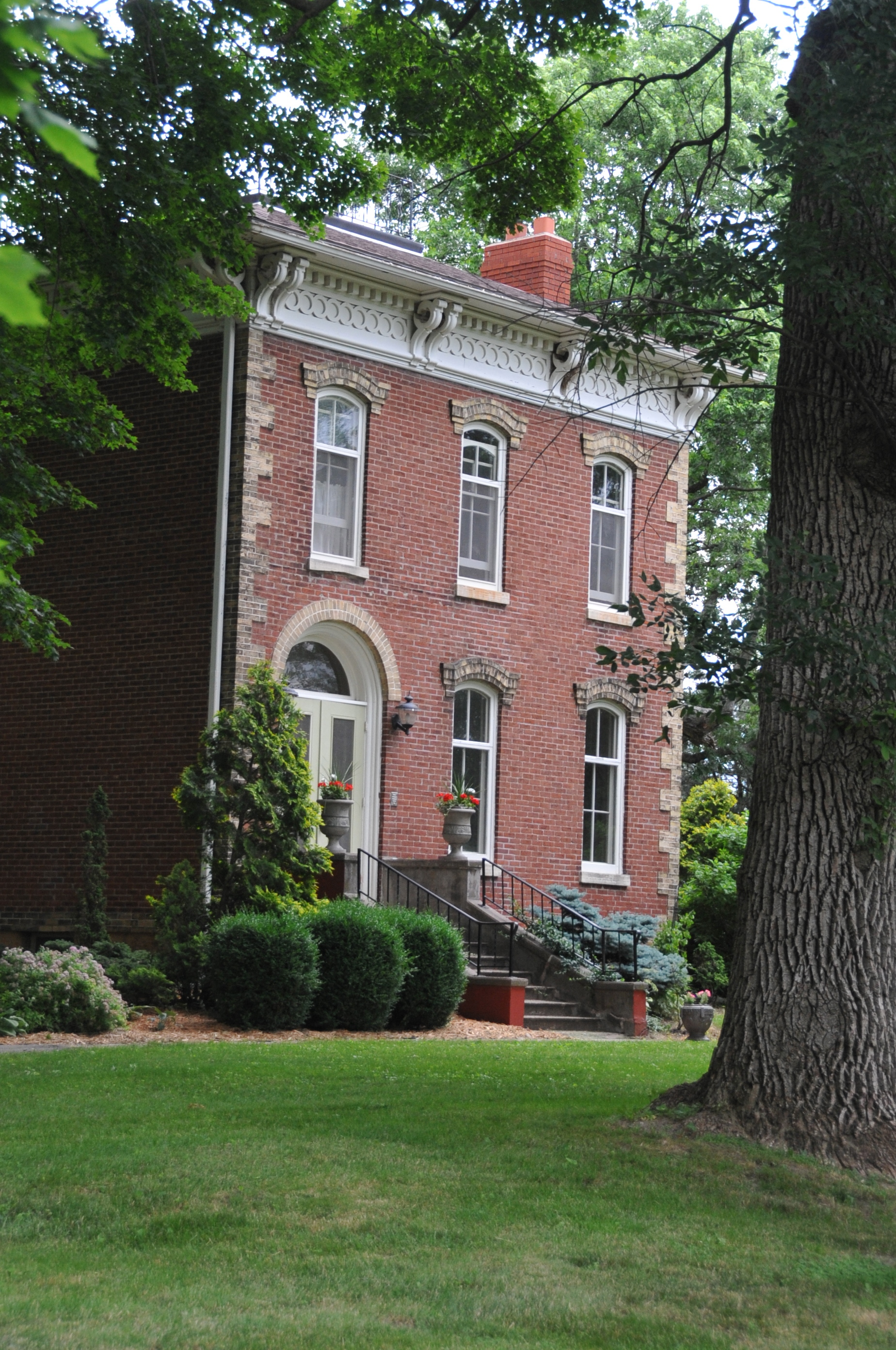

- Location within Iowa Location within the United States
- Location: 1458 Main Ave. Clinton, Iowa
- Coordinates: 41°52′28″N 90°12′28″W
- Built: 1871
- Architectural style: Italianate
- NRHP reference No.: 99001382
- Added to NRHP: November 22, 1999

Cherry Bank, also known as the Dr. A. L. Ankeny House and Lindmeier ("Cherrybank"), is an historic residence located in Clinton, Iowa, United States. The Italianate style house was built in 1871 by Dennis Warren. He meant the house for his favorite nephew, but Dr. Ankeny bought and lived in the house instead. The two-story structure is composed of red brick and has buff-colored brick for the quoins and the window arches. It features a cornice, hipped roof, and a widow's walk. The original front porch was removed in the 1920s. It was listed on the National Register of Historic Places in 1999.
