= Moeszinger-Marquis Hardware Co. =

- U.S. National Register of Historic Places
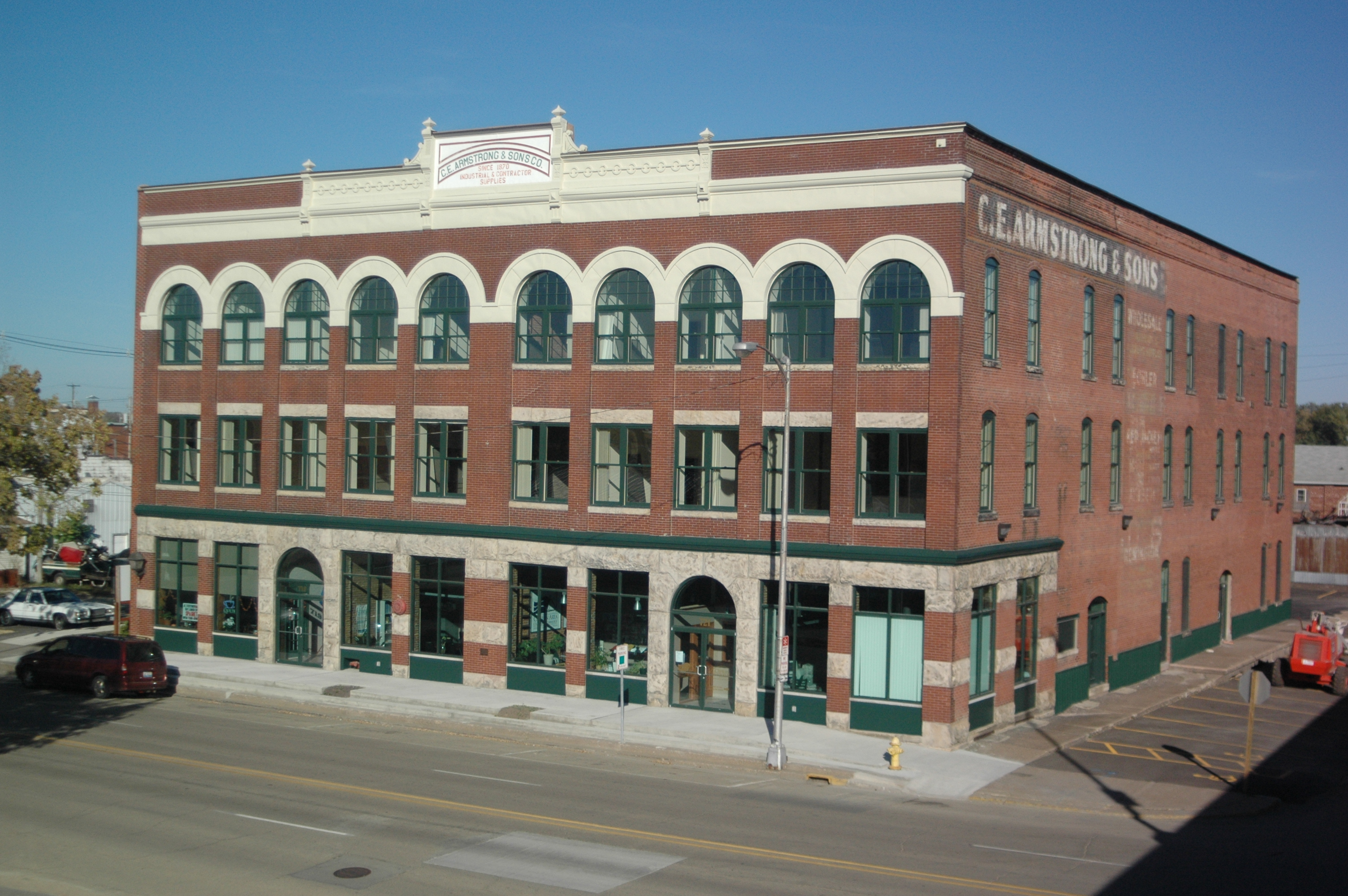

- Location within Iowa Location within the United States
- Location: 721 2nd St., S. Clinton, Iowa
- Coordinates: 41°50′26″N 90°11′18″W
- Built: 1898
- Architect: Josiah L. Rice
- Architectural style: Romanesque Revival
- MPS: Clinton, Iowa MPS
- NRHP reference No.: 06000004
- Added to NRHP: February 9, 2006

The Moeszinger-Marquis Hardware Co. is an historic building located in Clinton, Iowa, United States. The three-story brick warehouse building was an addition to the original building to the north, which has subsequently been demolished. Clinton architect Josiah L. Rice designed the building in the Romanesque Revival style. The C.E. Armstrong and Company, which was a wholesaler of hardware, plumbing, heating, and mill supplies occupied the building in 1932. It was listed on the National Register of Historic Places in 2006.
