= Lafayette Lamb House =

Historic house in Iowa, United States

- U.S. National Register of Historic Places
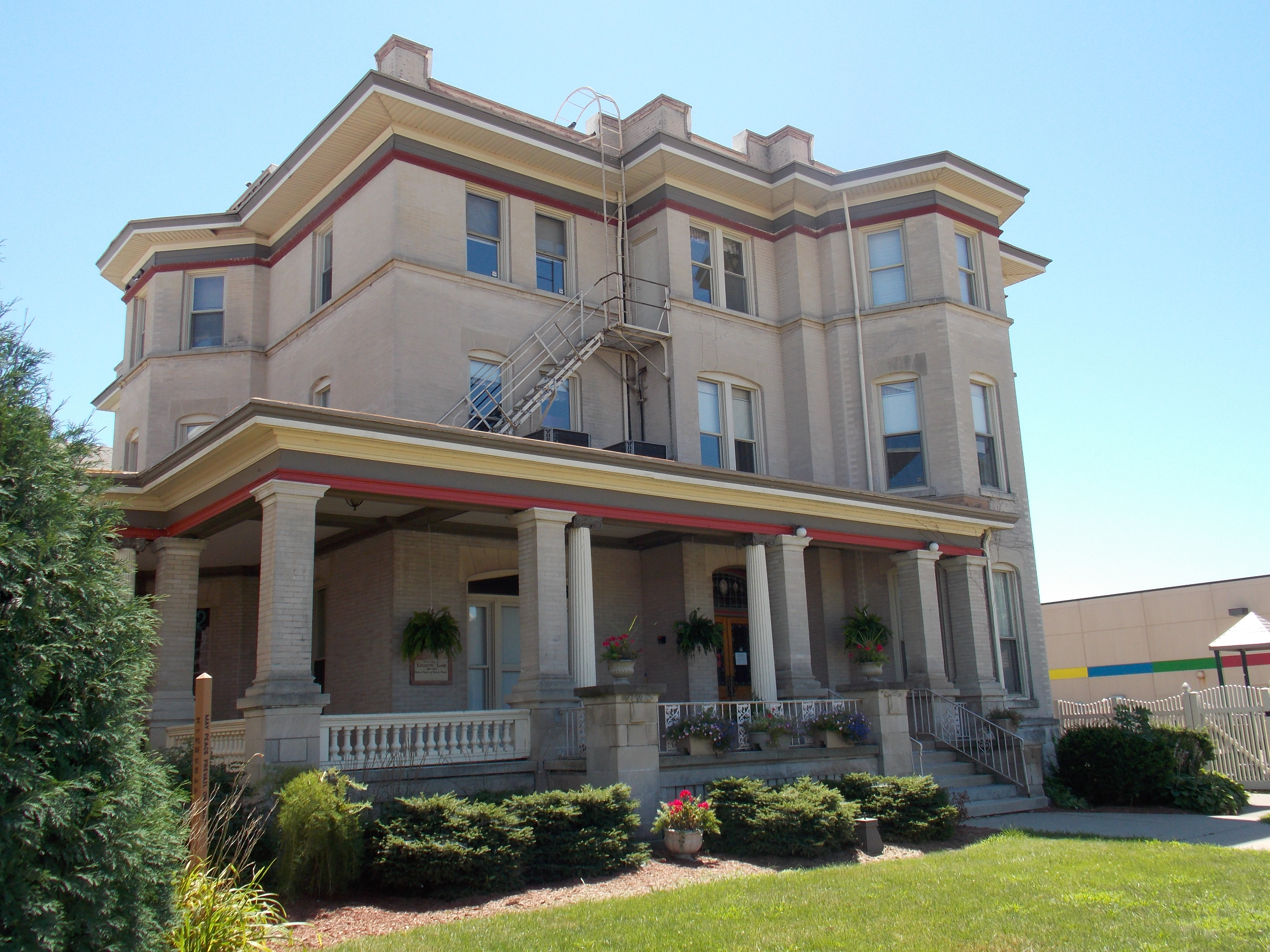

- Location within Iowa Location within the United States
- Location: 317 7th Ave., S. Clinton, Iowa
- Coordinates: 42°01′06″N 90°11′01″W
- Built: 1877
- Architect: W.W. Sanborn
- NRHP reference No.: 79000893
- Added to NRHP: October 18, 1979

The Lafayette Lamb House is an historic building located in Clinton, Iowa, United States. It was listed on the National Register of Historic Places in 1979.

== History ==
Clinton architect W.W. Sanborn originally designed the house in the Second Empire style. J. C. Clausen was superintendent of construction when it was built in 1877. The exterior was composed of red brick and it featured a mansard roof and turreted tower. It was built for lumber baron Lafayette Lamb.

The house was extensively renovated in 1906. The brick veneer was removed and replaced with gray cement brick of the Iowa Granite Brick company. A flat roof was installed and the tower was removed. As a result, the home now reflected the Georgian Revival style. In 1920 it was donated to the YWCA who continues to use the building. Other additions were built onto the building in subsequent years.
