= 1934 Big Ten Conference football season =

- Sport: Football
- Number of teams: 10
- Champion: Minnesota
- Runners-up: Ohio State
- Season MVP: Pug Lund

Football seasons
- ← 1933 1935 →

1934 Big Ten Conference football standings
	Conf.					Overall
Team	W		L		T	W		L		T
No. 1 Minnesota $	5	–	0	–	0	8	–	0	–	0
No. 9 Ohio State	5	–	1	–	0	7	–	1	–	0
No. 6 Illinois	4	–	1	–	0	7	–	1	–	0
Purdue	3	–	1	–	0	5	–	3	–	0
Wisconsin	2	–	3	–	0	4	–	4	–	0
Northwestern	2	–	3	–	0	3	–	5	–	0
Chicago	2	–	4	–	0	4	–	4	–	0
Indiana	1	–	3	–	1	3	–	3	–	2
Iowa	1	–	3	–	1	2	–	5	–	1
Michigan	0	–	6	–	0	1	–	7	–	0
$ – Conference champion; Rankings from Associated Press

The 1934 Big Ten Conference football season was the 39th season of college football played by the member schools of the Big Ten Conference (also known as the Western Conference) and was a part of the 1934 college football season.

The 1934 Minnesota Golden Gophers football team, under head coach Bernie Bierman, compiled an undefeated 8–0 record, won the Big Ten championship, led the conference in scoring offense (33.8 points per game), and was selected as the national champion by eight of the selectors recognized as official by the NCAA. Fullback Pug Lund received the Chicago Tribune Silver Football as the most valuable player of the Big Ten. Three Minnesota players were selected as consensus first-team All-Americans: Lund, end Frank Larson, and guard Bill Bevan.

The 1934 Illinois Fighting Illini football team, under head coach Robert Zuppke, compiled a 7–1 record and was ranked No. 4 under the Dickinson System. The lone setback was a 7-3 loss at Wisconsin. Halfback Bud Lindberg was selected as the team's most valuable player. Quarterback Jack Beynon was selected as a first-team All-Big Ten player.

The 1934 Ohio State Buckeyes football team, in the program's first year under Francis Schmidt, compiled a 7–1 record, led the Big Ten in scoring defense (4.3 points allowed per game), and was ranked No. 8 under the Dickinson System. Guard Regis Monahan and end Merle Wendt were selected as first-team All-Americans.

== Season overview ==
=== Results and team statistics ===
Conf. Rank	Team	Head coach	Overall record	Conf. record	UP final	PPG	PAG	MVP
1	Minnesota	Bernie Bierman	8–0	5–0	#1	33.8	4.8	Pug Lund
2	Ohio State	Francis Schmidt	7–1	5–1	#8	33.4	4.3	Gomer Jones
3	Illinois	Robert Zuppke	7–1	4–1	#4	12.9	5.4	Bud Lindberg
4	Purdue	Noble Kizer	5–3	3–1	NR	11.6	9.4	Duane Purvis
5	Wisconsin	Clarence Spears	4–4	2–3	NR	6.0	10.5	Milt Kummer
6	Northwestern	Dick Hanley	3–5	2–3	NR	8.0	15.0	Ed Whalen
7	Chicago	Clark Shaughnessy	4–4	2–4	NR	14.1	13.3	Ell Patterson
8	Indiana	Bo McMillin	3–3–2	1–3–1	NR	8.4	13.8	Don Veller
9	Iowa	Ossie Solem	2–5–1	1–3–1	NR	12.3	19.1	Dick Crayne
10	Michigan	Harry Kipke	1–7	0–6	NR	2.6	17.9	Gerald Ford

Key
DS = Rankings from Dickinson System. See 1934 college football season
PPG = Average of points scored per game
PAG = Average of points allowed per game
MVP = Most valuable player as voted by players on each team as part of the voting process to determine the winner of the Chicago Tribune Silver Football trophy

=== Bowl games ===
No Big Ten teams participated in any bowl games during the 1934 season.

== All-Big Ten players ==
The following players were picked by the Associated Press (AP) and/or the United Press (UP) as first-team players on the 1934 All-Big Ten Conference football team.

Position	Name	Team	Selectors
Quarterback	Jack Beynon	Illinois	AP, UP
Halfback	Jay Berwanger	Chicago	AP, UP
Halfback	Duane Purvis	Purdue	AP, UP
Fullback	Pug Lund	Minnesota	AP, UP
End	Frank Larson	Minnesota	AP, UP
End	Merle Wendt	Ohio State	AP
End	Bob Tenner	Minnesota	UP
Tackle	Phil Bengtson	Minnesota	AP, UP
Tackle	Ed Widseth	Minnesota	AP
Tackle	Chuck Galbreath	Illinois	UP
Guard	Bill Bevan	Minnesota	AP, UP
Guard	Regis Monahan	Ohio State	UP
Center	Ellmore Patterson	Chicago	AP, UP

== All-Americans ==
Two Big Ten players were selected as consensus first-team players on the 1934 College Football All-America Team. They were:

Position	Name	Team	Selectors
Fullback	Pug Lund	Minnesota	AAB, AP, COL, INS, LIB, NANA, TSN, UP, NYS, WCFF
End	Frank Larson	Minnesota	AP, COL, NANA, NEA, TSN, CP, NYS
Guard	Bill Bevan	Minnesota	COL, LIB, NANA, TSN, UP

Other Big Ten players received first-team honors from at least one selector. They were:

Position	Name	Team	Selectors
Guard	Regis Monahan	Ohio State	AAB, NEA, UP, CP, NYS [tackle], WCFF
Halfback	Jay Berwanger	Chicago	AAB, WCFF
Halfback	Duane Purvis	Purdue	TSN
End	Merle Wendt	Ohio State	INS
Tackle	Ed Widseth	Minnesota	INS
Center	Ellmore Patterson	Chicago	LIB
Fullback	Stan Kostka	Minnesota	NYS
