= 1933 All-Big Ten Conference football team =

American college football all-star team

The 1933 All-Big Ten Conference football team consists of American football players selected to the All-Big Ten Conference teams chosen by various selectors for the 1933 Big Ten Conference football season.

== All Big-Ten selections ==
=== Ends ===
- Ted Petoskey, Michigan (AP-1; UP-1; NK-1)
- Frank Larson, Minnesota (AP-1; UP-1; NK-1)
- Edgar Manske, Northwestern (AP-2)
- Sid Gillman, Ohio State (AP-2)
- Willis Ward, Michigan (NK-2)
- Fred Fink, Illinois (NK-2)

=== Tackles ===
- Whitey Wistert, Michigan (AP-1; UP-1; NK-1)
- Ted Rosequist, Ohio State (AP-2; UP-1)
- Dutch Fehring, Purdue (AP-1; NK-1)
- Thomas D. Austin, Michigan (AP-2)
- Conrad, Chicago (NK-2)
- Ed Ungers, Purdue (NK-2)

=== Guards ===
- Zud Schammel, Iowa (AP-1; UP-1; NK-1)
- Joseph T. Gailus, Ohio State (AP-1; UP-1; NK1)
- Fritz Febel, Purdue (AP-2; NK-2)
- Albert Kawal, Northwestern (AP-2; NK-2)
- Robert Jones, Indiana (UP-1)

=== Centers ===
- Chuck Bernard, Michigan (UP-1; NK-1)
- Thomas W. Moore, Iowa (AP-2)
- Roy Oen, Minnesota (NK-2)

=== Quarterbacks ===
- Joe Laws, Iowa (AP-1; UP-1 [halfback]; NK-2 [fullback])
- Jack Beynon, Illinois (AP-2; UP-1; NK-2))
- Paul Pardonner, Purdue (NK-1)

=== Halfbacks ===
- Pug Lund, Minnesota (AP-1; UP-1; NK-1)
- Herman Everhardus, Michigan (AP-1; NK-1 [fb])
- Jay Berwanger, Chicago (AP-2)
- James Carter, Purdue (AP-2)
- Dick Heekin, Ohio State (NK-2)
- Hecker, Purdue (NK-2)

=== Fullbacks ===
- Duane Purvis, Purdue (AP-1; UP-1; NK-1 [hb])
- Dick Crayne, Iowa (AP-2)

== Key ==
AP = Associated Press, "selected by the Associated Press with the assistance of coaches, officials and critics, who saw every player in action this fall"

UP = United Press chosen by the conference coaches

NK = Noble Kizer, head coach at Purdue and member of the NEA Service All-America Committee

Bold = Consensus first-team selection of both the AP and UP

== See also ==
- 1933 College Football All-America Team
