= 1934 All-Big Ten Conference football team =

American college football all-star team

The 1934 All-Big Ten Conference football team consists of American football players selected to the All-Big Ten Conference teams chosen by various selectors for the 1934 Big Ten Conference football season.

== All Big-Ten selections ==
=== Ends ===
- Frank Larson, Minnesota (AP-1, FH-1, UP-1)
- Merle Wendt, Ohio State (AP-1, FH-2, UP-2)
- Willis Ward, Michigan (FH-1)
- Bob Tenner, Minnesota (FH-2, UP-1)
- Stan Haukedahl, Wisconsin (UP-2)

=== Tackles ===
- Phil Bengtson, Minnesota (AP-1, UP-1)
- Ed Widseth, Minnesota (AP-1)
- Jerry Foster, Iowa (FH-1, UP-2)
- Chuck Galbreath, Illinois (FH-1, UP-1)
- Thomas Austin, Michigan (FH-2)
- Charley Hamrick, Ohio State (FH-2)
- Bruno Vercuski, Indiana (UP-2)

=== Guards ===
- Regis Monahan, Ohio State (FH-1, UP-1)
- Bill Bevan, Minnesota (AP-1, FH-1, UP-1)
- Albert Kawal, Northwestern (FH-2)
- Charles W. Bennis, Illinois (FH-2, UP-2)
- Mario Pacetti, Wisconsin (UP-2)

=== Centers ===
- Ellmore Patterson, Chicago (AP-1, FH-2, UP-1)
- Gomer Jones, Ohio State (FH-1, UP-2)

=== Quarterbacks ===
- Jack Beynon, Illinois (AP-1, FH-1, UP-1)
- Glenn Seidel, Minnesota (FH-2, UP-2)

=== Halfbacks ===
- Jay Berwanger, Chicago (AP-1, FH-2, UP-1)
- Duane Purvis, Purdue (AP-1; FH-1 [fullback], UP-1)
- Dick Heekin, Ohio State (FH-1, UP-2)
- Lester Lindberg, Illinois (FH-2)
- Dick Crayne, Iowa (UP-2)

=== Fullbacks ===
- Pug Lund, Minnesota (AP-1; FH-1 [halfback], UP-1)
- Stan Kostka, Minnesota (FH-2, UP-2)

== Key ==
AP = Associated Press chosen by the conference coaches for the Associated Press

FH = Francis Schmidt, Ohio State coach for the Newspaper Enterprise Association

UP = United Press

== See also ==
- 1934 College Football All-America Team
