= Ferris Jennings =

American football, baseball and basketball player (1913–1995)

- Ferris Jennings, 1934

No. 64 – Michigan Wolverines
- Positions: Quarterback, Safety

Personal information
- Born: November 10, 1913; Otsego County, Michigan
- Died: December 22, 1995 (aged 82); West Bloomfield, Michigan
- Listed height: 5 ft 10 in (1.78 m)
- Listed weight: 137 lb (62 kg)

Career information
- High school: Ann Arbor High School
- College: Michigan

Career history
- 1934–1936: Michigan

Ferris Gordon Jennings (November 10, 1913 – December 22, 1995) was an American football, baseball and basketball player. He played college football at the quarterback and safety positions for the University of Michigan in 1934 and 1936. He was the starting quarterback for the 1934 Michigan Wolverines football team. Jennings also played for the Michigan Wolverines men's basketball and Michigan Wolverines baseball teams between 1935 and 1937.

== Early life ==
Jennings was born in Michigan in 1913. His father, Ray Floyd Jennings, was a public school teacher in Charlton Township, Michigan, and later in Ann Arbor, Michigan. He attended Ann Arbor High School where he was selected as an all-state quarterback in 1932. He also received all-state honors in basketball.

== University of Michigan ==
In 1933, Jennings enrolled at the University of Michigan. As a sophomore, he played for the 1934 Michigan Wolverines football team. After a 16–0 loss to Michigan State in the first game of the season, head coach Harry Kipke named Jennings as the team's starting quarterback. Jennings was the team's starting quarterback in the remaining seven games of the 1934 season. He also played at the safety position on defense.

Jennings began the 1934 season weighing 137 pounds, but boosted his weight to 140 pounds by the time he took over as the starting quarterback. Press coverage regularly referred to him as "Little Ferris Jennings." In its pre-season football review, one magazine wrote: "For contrast there's a little Ann Arbor boy, Ferris Jennings, who will be at least second choice for quarterback, weighing 137 pounds. This is not the ready-made team that Michigan boasted a year ago or two years ago."

Jimmy Donahue, a syndicated sportswriter for the Newspaper Enterprise Association, wrote: "Another miniature edition of a gridder brought Michigan out of the doldrums to victory over Georgia Tech recently. He is 140-pound Ferris Jennings, who was so far down on the list at the beginning of the season that Coach Harry Kipke forgot all about him -— until Renner's injury and casualties to other signal callers forced him to call out the rear guard. The sophomore turned into a sensation ..."

Jennings gained national acclaim when he scored the first touchdown of the year for Michigan in a 9–2 win over Georgia Tech. Jennings returned a punt 66 yards for the game-winning touchdown. Jennings' touchdown against Georgia Tech proved to be the first of only two touchdown scored by the Wolverines during a 1934 season in which the team finished with a record of 1–7.

Jennings also won a reputation during the 1934 season as "a fearless and deadly tackler" on defense. One of the highlights of his 1934 season came in a loss to the 1934 Minnesota Golden Gophers national championship team. Jennings tackled the Gophers' 205-pound fullback Stan Kostka in the open field, as he appeared to be headed for a touchdown. A newspaper account compared the force of Jennings' hit to "a pack of dynamite," and noted that "instead of the slight Michigan back being injured it was the big Kostka who was carried off the field, knocked out by the force of the tackle."

Jennings' center on the 1934 team was Gerald Ford who later became the 38th President of the United States. In a 1994 interview, Ford described the impact on the 1934 team of losing starting quarterback William Renner to injury:

"In '32 and '33, we were undefeated, and then in '34 we had a tough, tough year. In those years, our offense was called a punt, a pass, and a prayer. We had an outstanding passer, Bill Renner, who broke an ankle before the season started. Our punter, John Regeczi, was the greatest college punter I ever saw and he ruined his knee. All we had left was the prayer."

As a junior in 1935, Jennings suffered a head injury after being kicked in the head while making a tackle in a pre-season scrimmage. Jennings missed the 1935 football season as a result of the injury. As the 1936 season got underway, one newspaper wrote that Michigan's "Game Guy" had returned to the football team: "Ferris Jennings the 'game guy' of Michigan football is back in uniform ... Jennings 140 pounds of nerve and determination was the hero of Michigan's 1934 season. Given his chance as quarterback Jennings made the most of a bad situation ... But it was as a defensive safety man that Jennings earned the appellation 'Game Guy.'"

== Coaching and later years ==
Jennings graduated from Michigan in 1938 with a bachelor of science degree in education. In August 1938, Jennings was hired as the football coach at Urbana High School in Urbana, Illinois. He also served as the basketball coach at Urbana.

By the late 1940s, Jennings had begun a career working in the automotive industry in the Detroit area. On December 31, 1964, he married Ann J. Bitar. From the 1960s until the early 1980s, he was the general manager of Duggan Masking Devices, Inc., in Detroit. He lived in West Bloomfield, Michigan in his later years. In 1995, Jennings died at the age of 82 in West Bloomfield.
