= 1934 Michigan Wolverines football team =

American college football season

1934 Michigan Wolverines football
- Conference: Big Ten Conference
- Record: 1–7 (0–6 Big Ten)
- Head coach: Harry Kipke (6th season)
- MVP: Gerald Ford
- Captain: Thomas Austin
- Home stadium: Michigan Stadium

1934 Big Ten Conference football standings
	Conf.					Overall
Team	W		L		T	W		L		T
No. 1 Minnesota $	5	–	0	–	0	8	–	0	–	0
No. 9 Ohio State	5	–	1	–	0	7	–	1	–	0
No. 6 Illinois	4	–	1	–	0	7	–	1	–	0
Purdue	3	–	1	–	0	5	–	3	–	0
Wisconsin	2	–	3	–	0	4	–	4	–	0
Northwestern	2	–	3	–	0	3	–	5	–	0
Chicago	2	–	4	–	0	4	–	4	–	0
Indiana	1	–	3	–	1	3	–	3	–	2
Iowa	1	–	3	–	1	2	–	5	–	1
Michigan	0	–	6	–	0	1	–	7	–	0
$ – Conference champion; Rankings from Associated Press

The 1934 Michigan Wolverines football team was an American football team that represented the University of Michigan in the 1934 Big Ten Conference football season. In their sixth season under head coach Harry Kipke, the Wolverines compiled a 1–7 record (0–6 against Big Ten opponents) and finished last in the Big Ten. Prior to the 1934 season, the Wolverines had compiled a 22-game undefeated streak dating back to October 1931.

Right tackle Thomas Austin was the team captain, and center Gerald Ford was selected as the most valuable player. Ford later became the 38th President of the United States. End Willis Ward was the team's leading scorer and received second-team honors from the College Sports Writers on the 1934 College Football All-America Team.

== Schedule ==
Date	Opponent	Site	Result	Attendance
October 6	Michigan State*	Michigan Stadium; Ann Arbor, MI (rivalry)	L 0–16	25,644
October 13	at Chicago	Stagg Field; Chicago, IL (rivalry)	L 0–27	18,013
October 20	Georgia Tech*	Michigan Stadium; Ann Arbor, MI	W 9–2	20,901
October 27	Illinois^{†}	Michigan Stadium; Ann Arbor, MI (rivalry)	L 6–7	34,822
November 3	at Minnesota	Memorial Stadium; Minneapolis, MN (Little Brown Jug)	L 0–34	59,362
November 10	Wisconsin	Michigan Stadium; Ann Arbor, MI	L 0–10	21,963
November 17	at Ohio State	Ohio Stadium; Columbus, OH (rivalry)	L 0–34	68,678
November 24	Northwestern	Michigan Stadium; Ann Arbor, MI (rivalry)	L 6–13	19,196
*Non-conference game; ^{†}Homecoming

== Season summary ==
=== Pre-season ===
Prior to the 1934 season, the Wolverines had won Big Ten championships in 1932 and 1933 while compiling a 22-game unbeaten streak. However, the team lost its leading players, including Whitey Wistert, Chuck Bernard, Ted Petoskey, Herman Everhardus, and Stanley Fay, to graduation in the spring of 1934.

=== Week 1: Michigan State ===
Week 1: Michigan State at Michigan

Team	1	2	3	4	Total
• Michigan State	0	0	3	13	16
Michigan	0	0	0	0	0

- Date: October 6
- Location: Michigan Stadium
- Game attendance: 25,644

On October 6, 1934, Michigan lost, 16–0, at Michigan Stadium in its annual rivalry game with Michigan State. The Detroit Free Press reported that the opening day crowd was 30,000 persons. After a scoreless first half, Kurt Warmbein ran for two touchdowns in the fourth quarter for Michigan State. Michigan State dominated the game statistically with 182 yards from scrimmage to 72 for Michigan, and with 15 first downs to three for Michigan.

The loss broke Michigan's 22-game unbeaten streak dating back to October 1931. It was also the Spartans' first victory over the Wolverines since 1915 and only the third in 29 games. After the game, a group of Michigan State supporters rushed the field and attempted to tear down the goal posts at the north end of the field. Michigan fans then charged the field to protect the goal posts. Fist fights ensued, and the "rioting" continued for 20 minutes.

=== Week 2: at Chicago ===
Week 2: Michigan at Chicago

Team	1	2	3	4	Total
Michigan	0	0	0	0	0
• Chicago	0	6	7	14	27

- Date: October 13
- Location: Stagg Field, Chicago
- Game attendance: 18,013

On October 13, 1934, Michigan lost, 27–0, to the Chicago Maroons at Stagg Field in Chicago. The loss was the most decisive for the Wolverines in the history of the Chicago–Michigan football rivalry dating back to the 1890s. Quarterback Tommy Flinn and halfbacks Jay Berwanger (the first player to win the Heisman Trophy) and Ned Bartlett starred for Chicago. Berwanger and Bartlett each scored two touchdowns. Statistically, the game was closer than on the scoreboard, as the Maroons out-gained the Wolverines by 174 yards for scrimmage to 159 for Michigan.

=== Week 3: Georgia Tech ===
Week 3: Georgia Tech at Michigan

Team	1	2	3	4	Total
Georgia Tech	0	0	0	2	2
• Michigan	0	0	9	0	9

- Date: October 20
- Location: Michigan Stadium
- Game attendance: 20,901

On October 20, 1934, Michigan defeated Georgia Tech by a 9–2 score before a crowd of 20,000 at Michigan Stadium. After a scoreless first half, Michigan quarterback Ferris Jennings returned a punt 70 yards for a touchdown in the third quarter. Vincent Aug kicked the extra point. On the final play of the quarter, Michigan blocked an attempted Georgia Tech pass from the end zone, and William F. Borgmann fell on the ball for a safety.

The Georgia Tech game is best known for a racial incident involving Michigan's African-American end Willis Ward. Georgia Tech football coach and athletic director W. A. "Bill" Alexander refused to allow his team to take the field if Ward played. As early as the fall of 1933, Alexander wrote to athletic director Fielding Yost asking what was going to be done about Ward, asserting that his team would not take the field if Ward played.

As the game approached, word spread that Georgia Tech was insisting that Ward not play, and that the administration might capitulate to the demand. Ward's right to play became a major controversy on the campus. Mass meetings and demonstrations were held. Some students and faculty demanded that either Ward must play or the game should be canceled. Petitions were circulated, and formal protests were lodged with the university by the Ann Arbor Ministerial Association, the NAACP, the National Student League and many other groups. The student newspaper, the Michigan Daily opined: "If the athletic department forgot it had Ward on its football team when it scheduled a game with Georgia Tech, it was astonishingly forgetful; ... if it was conscious of Ward's being on the team but scheduled the game anyway, it was extraordinarily stupid."

Time magazine ran a story about the uproar on Michigan's campus: "Fifteen hundred Michigan students and faculty members signed a petition asking that the team's star end, Negro Willis Ward, be allowed to play against Georgia Tech." According to Time, 200 "campus radicals" threatened to prevent the game from being played by standing in the middle of the field. Rumors of a sit-down protest on the 50-yard line during the game spread across campus in the week before the game. One alumnus recalled that, the night before the game, "bonfires lit all over the campus echoed with screams of student anger, and 'Kill Georgia Tech' was heard throughout Ann Arbor." In an attempt to thwart any attempt to disrupt the game, Yost hired a Pinkerton agent to infiltrate "The United Front Committee on Ward", a conglomerate of student organizations that supported Ward's right to play.

Athletic authorities argued that Ward should not play because it would be discourteous to Georgia Tech, and he might be injured. There was fear that if Ward played, he would be injured by malicious blows after the play had ended. Playwright Arthur Miller, then a writer for Michigan's student newspaper, learned first-hand about the strong resistance among the Georgia Tech team to playing on the same field with an African-American athlete. In his biography of Miller, Enoch Brater noted that Miller had friends from Arkansas who knew one of the Georgia Tech players. Brater described Miller's involvement this way: "Remmel [Miller’s friend from Arkansas] took Miller with them to meet with members of the team, to protest but also to appeal to the athletes' sense of fair play. 'Miller was right in the middle of this', Remmel recalls. Not only did the visiting team rebuff 'the Yankee' Miller 'in salty language', but they told him they would actually kill Ward if he set one foot on the Michigan gridiron. 'The Georgia Tech team was wild.' Miller was furious. He ‘went immediately to the office of the Michigan Daily and wrote an article about it, but it was not published.' . . . Remmel said that Miller 'could not believe that the Georgia Tech team would have tried to destroy Willis Ward—but, I am sure they would have.'"

In the end, Ward was not allowed to play. As his teammates faced Georgia Tech, there are conflicting reports as to Ward's whereabouts. According to Time, Ward "sat calmly in a radio booth, watched his teammates defeat the Southerners, 9-to-2." According to Behee, Ward was not even allowed to watch the game from the press box, or even from the bench of his own stadium. Instead, he spent the afternoon in a fraternity house. A third account states that Kipke "quietly sent Willis Ward off to scout another Michigan game in Wisconsin." The day after the Georgia Tech game was played, an editorial ran in The Michigan Daily stating "that everyone who touched (the Ward affair) did so only to lose in respect and esteem."

=== Week 4: Illinois ===
Week 4: Illinois at Michigan

Team	1	2	3	4	Total
• Illinois	0	7	0	0	7
Michigan	0	0	6	0	6

- Date: October 27
- Location: Michigan Stadium
- Game attendance: 34,822

On October 27, 1934, Michigan lost to Illinois by a 7–6 score at Michigan Stadium. Illinois took a 7–0 lead in the second quarter on a short touchdown run by John Theodore and successful extra point kick by Lester Lindberg. In the third quarter, fullback John Regeczi passed to end Michael Savage who then tossed a forward lateral to Willis Ward; Ward then ran 24 yards for a touchdown. Ward's kick for extra point went wide, and Illinois maintained a one-point lead. Michigan was held to 28 rushing yards and 34 passing yards in the game. The Illini gained 100 rushing yards and 72 passing yards.

=== Week 5: at Minnesota ===
Week 5: Michigan at Minnesota

Team	1	2	3	4	Total
Michigan	0	0	0	0	0
• Minnesota	0	0	20	14	34

- Date: November 3
- Location: Memorial Stadium, Minneapolis
- Game attendance: 59,362

On November 3, 1934, Michigan lost to Minnesota by a 34–0 score before a crowd of 59,362 in Minneapolis. Minnesota's victory returned the Little Brown Jug to Golden Gophers for the first time since 1927. After a scoreless first half, Minnesota scored 20 points in the third quarter and 14 in the fourth. Pug Lund starred for Minneapolis. The Golden Gophers out-gained the Wolverines by 307 yards from scrimmage to 76. Minnesota went on to an undefeated season and was recognized as the 1934 national championship.

=== Week 6: Wisconsin ===
Week 6: Wisconsin at Michigan

Team	1	2	3	4	Total
• Wisconsin	0	7	0	3	10
Michigan	0	0	0	0	0

- Date: November 10
- Location: Michigan Stadium
- Game attendance: 21,963

On November 10, 1934, Michigan lost to Wisconsin by a 10–0 score before a crowd of estimated at 25,000 at Michigan Stadium. Michigan out-gained Wisconsin by 120 rushing yards to 48 and 36 passing yards to 19. Despite mustering only 67 yards from scrimmage, Wisconsin managed to score twice. Halfback Lynn Jordan returned the opening kickoff 100 yards for a touchdown. The second Wisconsin score was set up by what the Detroit Free Press called "the most ridiculous play" of the season. John Regeczi took the snap in Michigan's end zone for a punt, then decided to run, ran three yards, changed his mind again, and finally kicked with three Badgers in front of him. The kick was blocked, Wisconsin recovered, and a field goal extended the Badgers' lead to 10 points.

=== Week 7: at Ohio State ===
Week 7: Michigan at Ohio State

Team	1	2	3	4	Total
Michigan	0	0	0	0	0
• Ohio State	7	6	0	21	34

- Date: November 17
- Location: Ohio Stadium, Columbus, OH
- Game attendance: 68,678

On November 17, 1934, Michigan lost its annual rivalry game with Ohio State by a 34–0 score at Ohio Stadium in Columbus, Ohio. The crowd of 68,000 was the largest in the Western Conference during the 1934 season. The game was Francis Schmidt's first against Michigan as Ohio State's head coach; he went on to win his first four games against Michigan. The Buckeyes scored five touchdowns, including three in the fourth quarter, and totaled 310 rushing yards and 141 passing yards. The Wolverines were held to only six net rushing yards and 34 passing yards. Ohio State touchdowns were scored by Dick Heekin (one-yard run in first quarter), Damon Wetzel, Frank Antenucci (recovered a Michigan fumble in the end zone), Merle Wendt (long pass from Frank Fisch), and Frank Comiskey (long pass from Tippy Dye).

=== Week 8: Northwestern ===
Week 8: Northwestern at Michigan

Team	1	2	3	4	Total
• Northwestern	0	0	6	7	13
Michigan	0	3	3	0	6

- Date: November 24
- Location: Michigan Stadium
- Game attendance: 19,196

On November 24, 1934, the Wolverines lost, 13–6, to Northwestern at Michigan Stadium. Willis Ward, playing his last game for Michigan, kicked two field goals for Michigan. Michigan led, 3–0, at halftime. The score was tied at 6–6 at the end of the third quarter. Northwestern took the lead in the fourth quarter on a one-yard touchdown run by Hugh Duvall. The defeat brought an end to the worst season in Michigan football history up to that time.

== Personnel ==
=== Varsity letter winners ===
The following 25 players received varsity letters for their participation on the 1934 Michigan football team. For players who were starters, the list also includes the number of games started by position. Players who started at least half of Michigan's games are displayed in bold.

- Robert Amrine, halfback, sophomore, London, Ohio - started 1 game at right guard
- **Vincent J. Aug**, halfback, junior - started 5 games at left halfback
- **Thomas D. Austin**, tackle, senior, Columbus, Ohio - started 7 games at right tackle
- Chester C. Beard, guard, senior, Youngstown, Ohio
- Frank S. Bissell, guard, sophomore, Hyannisport, Massachusetts
- George A. Bolas, quarterback, junior, Chicago, Illinois
- **William F. Borgmann**, guard, senior, Fort Wayne, Indiana - started 8 games at right tackle
- Joseph O. Ellis, quarterback/halfback, sophomore, Eagle River, Wisconsin - started 1 game at right halfback
- Chris Everhardus, halfback, sophomore, Kalamazoo, Michigan - started 1 game at right halfback
- **Gerald Ford**, center, senior, Grand Rapids, Michigan - started 8 games at center
- Russell J. Fuog, center, senior, Chicago, Illinois
- Cloyce E. Hanshue, guard, sophomore, Kalamazoo, Michigan
- **Willard H. Hildebrand**, guard/tackle, senior, Saginaw, Michigan - started 8 games at left guard
- Tage Jacobson, tackle, senior, Detroit, Michigan - started 1 game at right tackle
- **Ferris Jennings**, quarterback, sophomore, Ann Arbor, Michigan - started 7 games at quarterback
- Russ Oliver, fullback, senior, Pontiac, Michigan - started 1 game at quarterback
- **Matt Patanelli**, end, sophomore, Elkhart, Indiana - started 6 games at left end, 1 game at right end, 1 game at right halfback
- **John Regeczi**, fullback, senior, Muskegon Heights, Michigan - started 4 games at right halfback, 2 games at fullback, 1 game at left halfback
- Steve Remias, fullback, junior, Chicago, Illinois - started 1 game at fullback
- **Michael Savage**, end, junior, Dearborn, Michigan - started 2 games at left end, 2 games at right end
- Harold W. Sears, Jr., guard, sophomore, Grand Rapids, Michigan
- **Cedric C. Sweet**, fullback, sophomore, Fremont, Michigan - started 5 games at fullback
- Howard Triplehorn, halfback, junior, Bluffton, Ohio - started 1 game at left halfback
- **John Viergever**, tackle, junior, Algonac, Michigan - started 8 games at left tackle
- **Willis Ward**, end, senior, Detroit, Michigan - started 5 games at right end, 1 game at left halfback, 1 game at right halfback

=== Varsity reserves ===
The following six players were identified as varsity reserves on the roster of the 1934 Michigan football team.

- David G. Barnett, halfback, sophomore, Detroit, Michigan
- Ernest C. Johnson, end, junior, Grand Rapids, Michigan
- Winfred Nelson, halfback, Greenville, Michigan
- Harry J. Pillinger, quarterback, Whitehall, Michigan
- John A. Rieck, end, sophomore, Detroit, Michigan
- Harry T. Wright, tackle, sophomore, Mount Clemens, Michigan

=== Others ===
The following players were also included on the roster of the 1934 Michigan football team.

- Charles Brandman, quarterback, sophomore, Findlay, Ohio
- Carl W. Carr, Jr., tackle, sophomore, Saline, Michigan
- John M. Connolly, fullback, New Rochelle, New York
- Joe Fisher, tackle, junior, Ann Arbor, Michigan
- Jesse G. Garber, guard, sophomore, New York, New York
- Robert Graper, end, sophomore, Maumee, Ohio
- Phillip H. Jacobs, halfback, sophomore, Sault Ste. Marie, Michigan
- Richard H. James, quarterback, junior, Detroit, Michigan
- James A. Kidston, fullback, LaGrange, Illinois
- Franklin Lett, end, sophomore, Battle Creek, Michigan
- Jack K. Liffiton, fullback, sophomore, Lakewood, Ohio
- Earl J. Meyers, end, sophomore, Detroit, Michigan
- John Mumford, fullback, sophomore, Highland Park, Michigan
- Thomas T. Oyler, end, sophomore, Cincinnati, Ohio
- Ernest A. Pederson, guard, sophomore, Grand Blanc, Michigan
- Vincent Pope, fullback, Dearborn, Michigan
- William Renner, quarterback, senior, Youngstown, Ohio
- George Rudness, halfback, junior, Negaunee, Michigan
- Stanton J. Schuman, center, sophomore, Winnetka, Illinois
- Eli Soodik, guard, senior, New Brighton, Pennsylvania
- Edward Adam Stone, tackle, junior, Chicago, Illinois

=== Awards and honors ===
- Captain: Thomas Austin
- Most Valuable Player: Gerald Ford
- Meyer Morton Award: Matt Patanelli

=== Coaching staff ===
- Head coach: Harry Kipke
- Assistant coaches: Franklin Cappon, Ray Courtright, Ray Fisher, Jack Heston, Cliff Keen, Bennie Oosterbaan, Walter Weber
- Trainer: Ray Roberts
- Manager: George Y. Duffy, Robert Olsen (assistant), Daniel F. Hulgrave (assistant), Robert Hilty (assistant)

=== Scoring leaders ===
Player	Touchdowns	Extra points	Field goals	Safeties	Total
Willis Ward	1	0	2	0	12
Ferris Jennings	1	0	0	0	6
Vincent Aug	0	1	0	0	1
Defense	0	0	0	1	2
Total	2	1	2	1	21
