= William F. Borgmann =

American football player, coach, and businessman (1913–2003)

- Borgmann in 1934

No. 6
- Position: Guard

Personal information
- Born: May 18, 1913; Fort Wayne, Indiana, U.S.
- Died: November 2, 2003 (aged 90); Savannah, Georgia, U.S.
- Listed height: 5 ft 10 in (1.78 m)
- Listed weight: 180 lb (82 kg)

Career information
- High school: North Side (Fort Wayne, Indiana)
- College: Michigan

Career history
- 1932–1934: Michigan

Awards and highlights
- National champion (1933)

William F. Borgmann (May 18, 1913 – November 2, 2003) was an American football player and coach and businessman. He was a lineman for the undefeated national champion 1932 and 1933 Michigan Wolverines football teams and a line-mate of future President Gerald Ford on the 1934 team. He was also an assistant football coach on Michigan's 1935 team.

== Early life ==
Borgmann was born in Fort Wayne, Indiana, in 1913 as the only child of Walter and Pauline (Doenges) Borgmann. He attended North Side High School where he played football and basketball and received the Guild Trophy as the outstanding scholar-athlete of his graduating class.

== University of Michigan ==
Borgmann enrolled at the University of Michigan where he played at the guard position on the undefeated national champion 1932 and 1933 Michigan Wolverines football teams. He was also a teammate of Gerald Ford, both playing in the line, for the 1934 Michigan Wolverines football team. In October 1934, Georgia Tech football coach and athletic director W. A. "Bill" Alexander refused to allow his team to take the field if Willis Ward, an African-American player, took the field for Michigan. Ford, Borgmann and others protested when the administration decided to pull Ward from the game. Ford later recalled that, during the game, a Georgia Tech lineman taunted, "Where's your black player?" According to Ford, three plays later, the player making the taunt was hit simultaneously by Borgmann and Ford and had to be carried off the field on a stretcher.

After receiving his bachelor's degree in 1935, Borgmann enrolled at the University of Michigan Law School where he received his LL.B. degree in 1938. He served as an assistant football coach under Michigan head coach Harry Kipke during the 1935 football season.

== Later life ==
After receiving his law degree, Borgmann returned to Fort Wayne, Indiana. During World War II, he served in the U.S. military in the European Theater of Operations.

After the war, Borgmann worked for the Lincoln National Life Insurance Company and later for Central Soya Company. He retired in 1978 and moved to Savannah, Georgia. Borgmann also served as a football official for the Big Ten Conference for 20 years.

Borgmann died in 2003 at the Spanish Oaks Retreat in Savannah. He was age 90 at the time of his death. He was survived by his wife of 63 years, Helen Louise Borgmann, a daughter, Suellen B. Craig, and three sons, William F. Borgmann Jr., Daniel J. Borgmann, and Thomas A. Borgmann.

Borgmann and Gerald Ford remained friends throughout their lives. Upon Borgmann's death, Ford wrote a handwritten condolence letter to his widow, Helen. The letter said, in part: "Bill was a long time, very dear friend. A wonderful team-mate at Michigan. We had a great relationship. You should be very proud of his record at Michigan. I treasured his friendship and will forever recall our times together at Michigan."
