= 1934 Illinois Fighting Illini football team =

American college football season

1934 Illinois Fighting Illini football
- Conference: Big Ten Conference
- Record: 7–1 (4–1 Big Ten)
- Head coach: Robert Zuppke (22nd season)
- MVP: Les Lindberg
- Captains: Charles Bennis; Jack Beynon
- Home stadium: Memorial Stadium

1934 Big Ten Conference football standings
	Conf.					Overall
Team	W		L		T	W		L		T
No. 1 Minnesota $	5	–	0	–	0	8	–	0	–	0
No. 9 Ohio State	5	–	1	–	0	7	–	1	–	0
No. 6 Illinois	4	–	1	–	0	7	–	1	–	0
Purdue	3	–	1	–	0	5	–	3	–	0
Wisconsin	2	–	3	–	0	4	–	4	–	0
Northwestern	2	–	3	–	0	3	–	5	–	0
Chicago	2	–	4	–	0	4	–	4	–	0
Indiana	1	–	3	–	1	3	–	3	–	2
Iowa	1	–	3	–	1	2	–	5	–	1
Michigan	0	–	6	–	0	1	–	7	–	0
$ – Conference champion; Rankings from Associated Press

The 1934 Illinois Fighting Illini football team was an American football team that represented the University of Illinois during the 1934 college football season. In their 22nd season under head coach Robert Zuppke, the Illini compiled a 7–1 record and finished in third place in the Big Ten Conference. The lone setback was a 7–3 loss at Wisconsin. Halfback Les Lindberg was selected as the team's most valuable player.

== Schedule ==
Date	Time	Opponent	Site	Result	Attendance	Source
September 29		Bradley*	Memorial Stadium; Champaign, IL	W 40–7	26,027	
October 6	2:30 p.m.	at Washington University*	Francis Field; St. Louis, MO	W 12–7	7,229	
October 13		Ohio State	Memorial Stadium; Champaign, IL (Illibuck)	W 14–13	24,831	
October 27		at Michigan	Michigan Stadium; Ann Arbor, MI (rivalry)	W 7–6	34,822	
November 3		Army	Memorial Stadium; Champaign, IL	W 7–0	42,000	
November 10		at Northwestern	Dyche Stadium; Evanston, IL (rivalry)	W 14–3	36,000	
November 17		at Wisconsin	Camp Randall Stadium; Madison, WI	L 3–7	23,817	
November 24		at Chicago	Stagg Field; Chicago, IL	W 6–0	29,828	
*Non-conference game; All times are in Central time

== Players ==
- Charles W. Bennis - guard (2nd-team All-Big Ten pick by UP)
- Jack Beynon - quarterback (1st-team All-Big Ten pick by AP and UP)
- Chuck Galbreath - tackle (1st-team All-Big Ten pick by UP; 3rd-team All-American pick by AP)
- Lester Lindberg - halfback
