= 1934 Minnesota Golden Gophers football team =

American college football season

1934 Minnesota Golden Gophers football

National champion (eight selectors) Big Ten champion
- Conference: Big Ten Conference
- Record: 8–0 (5–0 Big Ten)
- Head coach: Bernie Bierman (3rd season)
- Offensive scheme: Single-wing
- MVP: Pug Lund
- Captain: Pug Lund
- Home stadium: Memorial Stadium

1934 Big Ten Conference football standings
	Conf.					Overall
Team	W		L		T	W		L		T
No. 1 Minnesota $	5	–	0	–	0	8	–	0	–	0
No. 9 Ohio State	5	–	1	–	0	7	–	1	–	0
No. 6 Illinois	4	–	1	–	0	7	–	1	–	0
Purdue	3	–	1	–	0	5	–	3	–	0
Wisconsin	2	–	3	–	0	4	–	4	–	0
Northwestern	2	–	3	–	0	3	–	5	–	0
Chicago	2	–	4	–	0	4	–	4	–	0
Indiana	1	–	3	–	1	3	–	3	–	2
Iowa	1	–	3	–	1	2	–	5	–	1
Michigan	0	–	6	–	0	1	–	7	–	0
$ – Conference champion; Rankings from Associated Press

The 1934 Minnesota Golden Gophers football team represented the University of Minnesota in the 1934 college football season. In their third year under head coach Bernie Bierman, the Golden Gophers compiled an undefeated 8–0 record, shut out four opponents, and outscored all opponents by a combined total of 270 to 38.

The team was named national champion by eight NCAA-designated major selectors, then and in the decades since: Billingsley, Boand, Dickinson, College Football Researchers Association, Helms, Litkenhous, National Championship Foundation, and Sagarin, with Alabama also receiving recognition.

Halfback Pug Lund was selected for the team's Most Valuable Player award for the second consecutive year. Lund also received Chicago Tribune Silver Football, awarded to the most valuable player of the Big Ten, and was named an All-American by the AP, Collier's Weekly/Grantland Rice, Liberty, Walter Camp Football Foundation and Look Magazine.

End Frank Larson was named an All-American by the Associated Press (AP), Collier's Weekly/Grantland Rice and Look Magazine. Guard Bill Bevan was named an All-American by Collier's Weekly/Grantland Rice, Liberty and Look Magazine. End Bob Tenner was named an All-American by the United Press International. Tackle Phil Bengtson, Bevan, Larson, Lund, Tenner, and tackle Ed Widseth were named All-Big Ten.

Total attendance for the season was 192,922, which averaged to 38,584. The season high for attendance was against rival Michigan.

== Schedule ==
Date	Opponent	Site	Result	Attendance	Source
September 29	North Dakota Agricultural*	Memorial Stadium; Minneapolis, MN	W 56–12	25,000–26,544	
October 6	Nebraska*	Memorial Stadium; Minneapolis, MN (rivalry)	W 20–0	38,000	
October 20	at Pittsburgh*	Pitt Stadium; Pittsburgh, PA	W 13–7	64,850–65,000	
October 27	at Iowa	Iowa Stadium; Iowa City, IA (rivalry)	W 48–12	53,000	
November 3	Michigan^{†}	Memorial Stadium; Minneapolis, MN (Little Brown Jug)	W 34–0	59,362	
November 10	Indiana	Memorial Stadium; Minneapolis, MN	W 30–0	28,100	
November 17	Chicago	Memorial Stadium; Minneapolis, MN	W 35–7	46,000	
November 24	at Wisconsin	Camp Randall Stadium; Madison, WI (rivalry)	W 34–0	38,000	
*Non-conference game; ^{†}Homecoming

== Roster ==
- Jules Alfonse, HB
- Selmer A. Anderson
- Ray Antil, E
- Sheldon Beise, FB
- Phil Bengtson, T
- Bruce H. Berryman, E
- Bill Bevan, G
- Jay C. Bevan
- Milt Bruhn, G
- Arthur Clarkson, HB
- Frank Dallera, G
- William I. Freimuth, G
- Maurice D. S. Johnson, E
- Leslie R. Knudsen
- Stan Kostka, FB
- Frank Larson, E
- Babe LeVoir, QB
- Pug Lund, HB
- Lou Midler
- Vern Oech, G
- Richard Potvin
- William E. Proffitt
- Dale H. Rennebohm, C
- George Rennix, HB
- John D. Ronning, E
- Whitman H. Rork, FB
- George E. Roscoe, HB
- Glen E. Seidel, QB
- B. Willis Smith
- Dick Smith, T
- George Svendsen, C
- Bob Tenner, E
- Ed Widseth, T
- Bud Wilkinson, G
