= 1934 Wisconsin Badgers football team =

American college football season

1934 Wisconsin Badgers football
- Conference: Big Ten Conference
- Record: 4–4 (3–4 Big Ten)
- Head coach: Clarence Spears (3rd season)
- MVP: Milt Kummer
- Captain: John Bender
- Home stadium: Camp Randall Stadium

1934 Big Ten Conference football standings
	Conf.					Overall
Team	W		L		T	W		L		T
No. 1 Minnesota $	5	–	0	–	0	8	–	0	–	0
No. 9 Ohio State	5	–	1	–	0	7	–	1	–	0
No. 6 Illinois	4	–	1	–	0	7	–	1	–	0
Purdue	3	–	1	–	0	5	–	3	–	0
Wisconsin	2	–	3	–	0	4	–	4	–	0
Northwestern	2	–	3	–	0	3	–	5	–	0
Chicago	2	–	4	–	0	4	–	4	–	0
Indiana	1	–	3	–	1	3	–	3	–	2
Iowa	1	–	3	–	1	2	–	5	–	1
Michigan	0	–	6	–	0	1	–	7	–	0
$ – Conference champion; Rankings from Associated Press

The 1934 Wisconsin Badgers football team was an American football team that represented the University of Wisconsin in the 1934 Big Ten Conference football season. The team compiled a 4–4 record (2–3 against conference opponents) and finished in a tie for fifth place in the Big Ten Conference. Clarence Spears was in his third year as Wisconsin's head coach.

Guard Milt Kummer was selected as the team's most valuable player. John Bender was the team captain. End Stan Haukedahl and guard Mario Pacetti were selected by the United Press as second-team players on the 1934 All-Big Ten Conference football team. Lynn Jordan returned a kickoff 99 yards for a touchdown against Michigan on November 10, 1934.

The team played its home games at Camp Randall Stadium, which had a capacity of 32,700. During the 1934 season, the average attendance at home games was 20,666.

== Schedule ==
Date	Opponent	Site	Result	Attendance	Source
October 6	Marquette*	Camp Randall Stadium; Madison, WI	W 3–0	19,588	
October 13	South Dakota State*	Camp Randall Stadium; Madison, WI	W 28–7		
October 20	at Purdue	Ross–Ade Stadium; West Lafayette, IN	L 0–14	18,000	
October 27	at Notre Dame*	Notre Dame Stadium; Notre Dame, IN	L 0–19	25,354	
November 3	at Northwestern	Dyche Stadium; Evanston, IL	L 0–7	15,000	
November 10	at Michigan	Michigan Stadium; Ann Arbor, MI	W 10–0	21,963	
November 17	Illinois^{†}	Camp Randall Stadium; Madison, WI	W 7–3	23,817	
November 24	Minnesota	Camp Randall Stadium; Madison, WI (rivalry)	L 0–34	38,000	
*Non-conference game; ^{†}Homecoming
