= 1934 Purdue Boilermakers football team =

American college football season

1934 Purdue Boilermakers football
- Conference: Big Ten Conference
- Record: 5–3 (3–1 Big Ten)
- Head coach: Noble Kizer (5th season)
- Captain: Carl D. Heldt
- Home stadium: Ross–Ade Stadium

1934 Big Ten Conference football standings
	Conf.					Overall
Team	W		L		T	W		L		T
No. 1 Minnesota $	5	–	0	–	0	8	–	0	–	0
No. 9 Ohio State	5	–	1	–	0	7	–	1	–	0
No. 6 Illinois	4	–	1	–	0	7	–	1	–	0
Purdue	3	–	1	–	0	5	–	3	–	0
Wisconsin	2	–	3	–	0	4	–	4	–	0
Northwestern	2	–	3	–	0	3	–	5	–	0
Chicago	2	–	4	–	0	4	–	4	–	0
Indiana	1	–	3	–	1	3	–	3	–	2
Iowa	1	–	3	–	1	2	–	5	–	1
Michigan	0	–	6	–	0	1	–	7	–	0
$ – Conference champion; Rankings from Associated Press

The 1934 Purdue Boilermakers football team was an American football team that represented Purdue University during the 1934 college football season. In their fifth season under head coach Noble Kizer, the Boilermakers compiled a 5–3 record, finished in fourth place in the Big Ten Conference with a 3–1 record against conference opponents, and outscored opponents by a total of 93 to 75. Carl D. Heldt was the team captain.

== Schedule ==
Date	Opponent	Site	Result	Attendance	Source
October 6	Rice*	Ross–Ade Stadium; West Lafayette, IN	L 0–14	12,000	
October 13	at Notre Dame*	Notre Dame Stadium; Notre Dame, IN (rivalry)	L 7–18	45,000	
October 20	Wisconsin^{†}	Ross–Ade Stadium; West Lafayette, IN	W 14–0	18,000	
October 27	at Carnegie Tech*	Pitt Stadium; Pittsburgh, PA	W 20–0	6,000	
November 3	at Chicago	Stagg Field; Chicago, IL (rivalry)	W 26–20	32,000	
November 10	at Iowa	Iowa Stadium; Iowa City, IA	W 13–6	20,000	
November 17	at Fordham*	Polo Grounds; New York, NY	W 7–0	25,000	
November 24	Indiana	Ross–Ade Stadium; West Lafayette, IN (Old Oaken Bucket)	L 6–17	24,000	
*Non-conference game; ^{†}Homecoming

== Roster ==
- Herman Adams, E
- Orvil Anderson, HB
- George Basker, HB
- C. C. Baumbach, E
- George Bell, C
- John Burch, FB
- Forrest Burmeister, G-T
- James Carter, HB
- Vince Cherico, QB-FB
- Vernon Craig, HB
- Carl Dahlbeck, G
- Leon Dailey, HB
- Ernest Davidson, E
- Lowell Decker, FB-HB
- George Dennis, T-G
- Emerson Denton, C
- Johnny Drake, FB
- Ted Fehring, T
- Wayne Gift, QB
- Lee Graves, G
- Howard Guirl, E
- Frank Haas, E
- Carl Heldt, T
- Earl Hoagland, HB
- Robert Jennings, G-T
- D. Edward Jiorle, E
- Frank Kirk, T
- Frank Loebs, E
- Joe Modzeleski, G
- Duane Purvis, HB-FB
- William Riblet, HB-QB
- Dick Sandefur, FB
- Wayne Sandefur, G-T-K
- Ed Skoronski, C
- Fred Stalcup, QB-HB
- Dan Toriello, QB
- Fred Voss, G
- Frederick Wahl
