= 1934 Iowa Hawkeyes football team =

American college football season

1934 Iowa Hawkeyes football
- Conference: Big Ten Conference
- Record: 2–5–1 (1–3–1 Big Ten)
- Head coach: Ossie Solem (3rd season)
- MVP: Richard Crayne
- Captain: Russell Fisher
- Home stadium: Iowa Stadium

1934 Big Ten Conference football standings
	Conf.					Overall
Team	W		L		T	W		L		T
No. 1 Minnesota $	5	–	0	–	0	8	–	0	–	0
No. 9 Ohio State	5	–	1	–	0	7	–	1	–	0
No. 6 Illinois	4	–	1	–	0	7	–	1	–	0
Purdue	3	–	1	–	0	5	–	3	–	0
Wisconsin	2	–	3	–	0	4	–	4	–	0
Northwestern	2	–	3	–	0	3	–	5	–	0
Chicago	2	–	4	–	0	4	–	4	–	0
Indiana	1	–	3	–	1	3	–	3	–	2
Iowa	1	–	3	–	1	2	–	5	–	1
Michigan	0	–	6	–	0	1	–	7	–	0
$ – Conference champion; Rankings from Associated Press

The 1934 Iowa Hawkeyes football team was an American football team that represented the University of Iowa as a member of the Big Ten Conference during the 1934 Big Ten football season. In their third season under head coach Ossie Solem, the Hawkeyes compiled a 2–5–1 record (1–3–1 in conference games), finished in ninth place in the Big Ten, and were outscored by a total of 153 to 98.

The team played its home games at Iowa Stadium (later renamed Kinnick Stadium) in Iowa City, Iowa.

== Schedule ==
Date	Opponent	Site	Result	Attendance	Source
September 29	South Dakota*	Iowa Stadium; Iowa City, IA	W 34–0		
October 6	at Northwestern	Dyche Stadium; Evanston, IL	W 20–7	25,000	
October 13	at Nebraska*	Memorial Stadium; Lincoln, NE (rivalry)	L 13–14	34,769	
October 20	at Iowa State*	State Field; Ames, IA (rivalry)	L 6–31		
October 27	Minnesota^{†}	Iowa Stadium; Iowa City, IA (rivalry)	L 12–48	53,000	
November 3	at Indiana	Memorial Stadium; Bloomington, IN	T 0–0		
November 10	Purdue	Iowa Stadium; Iowa City, IA	L 6–13	20,000	
November 24	at Ohio State	Ohio Stadium; Columbus, OH	L 7–40	27,414	
*Non-conference game; ^{†}Homecoming
