= Minnesota Golden Gophers football under Bernie Bierman =

American college football seasons, 1932–1941; 1945–1950

Bernie Bierman was the head football coach at the University of Minnesota for 16 seasons, from 1932 through 1941 and then again from 1945 to 1950. The team had a 93-35-6 overall record. In the Big Ten, the Golden Gophers had a 57-28-6 record and won six conference championships. The team won national titles in 1934, 1935, 1936, 1940 and 1941. Twenty-one players were awarded All-American status. Thirty-six players were named All-Big Ten first team.
