= 1934 Northwestern Wildcats football team =

American college football season

1934 Northwestern Wildcats football
- Conference: Big Ten Conference
- Record: 3–5 (2–3 Big Ten)
- Head coach: Dick Hanley (8th season)
- Captain: Albert Kawal
- Home stadium: Dyche Stadium

1934 Big Ten Conference football standings
	Conf.					Overall
Team	W		L		T	W		L		T
No. 1 Minnesota $	5	–	0	–	0	8	–	0	–	0
No. 9 Ohio State	5	–	1	–	0	7	–	1	–	0
No. 6 Illinois	4	–	1	–	0	7	–	1	–	0
Purdue	3	–	1	–	0	5	–	3	–	0
Wisconsin	2	–	3	–	0	4	–	4	–	0
Northwestern	2	–	3	–	0	3	–	5	–	0
Chicago	2	–	4	–	0	4	–	4	–	0
Indiana	1	–	3	–	1	3	–	3	–	2
Iowa	1	–	3	–	1	2	–	5	–	1
Michigan	0	–	6	–	0	1	–	7	–	0
$ – Conference champion; Rankings from Associated Press

The 1934 Northwestern Wildcats team represented Northwestern University during the 1934 college football season. In their eighth year under head coach Dick Hanley, the Wildcats compiled a 3–5 record (2–3 against Big Ten Conference opponents) and finished in fifth place in the Big Ten Conference.

== Schedule ==
Date	Opponent	Site	Result	Attendance	Source
September 29	Marquette*	Dyche Stadium; Evanston, IL	W 21–12	25,000	
October 6	Iowa	Dyche Stadium; Evanston, IL	L 7–20	25,000	
October 13	at Stanford*	Stanford Stadium; Stanford, CA	L 0–20		
October 27	Ohio State	Dyche Stadium; Evanston, IL	L 6–28	18,000	
November 3	Wisconsin	Dyche Stadium; Evanston, IL	W 7–0	15,000	
November 10	Illinois	Dyche Stadium; Evanston, IL (rivalry)	L 3–14	36,000	
November 17	Notre Dame*	Dyche Stadium; Evanston, IL (rivalry)	L 7–20	45,000	
November 24	at Michigan	Michigan Stadium; Ann Arbor, MI (rivalry)	W 13–6	25,000	
*Non-conference game
