= Bernie Bierman =

American college football player and coach (1894–1977)

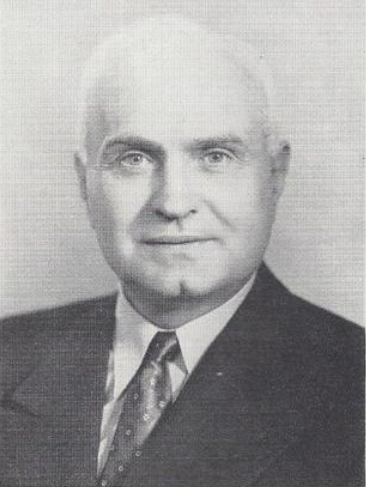
- Bierman, c. 1948

Biographical details
- Born: March 11, 1894; Springfield, Minnesota, U.S.
- Died: March 7, 1977 (aged 82); Laguna Hills, California, U.S.

Playing career

Football
- 1913–1915: Minnesota
- Position: Halfback

Coaching career (HC unless noted)

Football
- 1919–1921: Montana
- 1923–1924: Tulane (assistant)
- 1925–1926: Mississippi A&M
- 1927–1931: Tulane
- 1932–1941: Minnesota
- 1942: Iowa Pre-Flight
- 1945–1950: Minnesota

Basketball
- 1919–1922: Montana
- 1925–1927: Mississippi A&M
- 1928–1930: Tulane

Head coaching record
- Overall: 153–65–12 (football); 89–51 (basketball)
- Bowls: 0–1

Accomplishments and honors

Championships
- 5 National (1934–1936, 1940–1941); 3 SoCon (1929–1931); 7 Big Ten (1933–1935, 1937–1938, 1940–1941)

Awards
- Amos Alonzo Stagg Award (1958); Second-team All-American (1915); First-team All-Western (1915)
- College Football Hall of Fame; Inducted in 1955 (profile)

Bernard W. Bierman (March 11, 1894 – March 7, 1977) was an American college football coach best known for his years as head coach of the Minnesota Golden Gophers football program. Between 1934-41, his Minnesota teams won five national championships (1934, 1935, 1936, 1940, and 1941), seven Big Ten championships (1933, 1934, 1935, 1937, 1938, 1940, and 1941) and had four perfect seasons (1934, 1935, 1940, 1941). Bierman's five national championships rank him third all-time, as only Nick Saban (7) and Bear Bryant (6) have won more.

Bierman was born and raised in Minnesota and attended the University of Minnesota where he played football, basketball, and track, and was captain of the undefeated 1915 football team.

Bierman later served as the head football coach at the University of Montana (1919–1921), Mississippi A&M (1925–1926), Tulane University (1927–1931), Iowa Pre-Flight (1942), and Minnesota (1932–1941, 1945–1950). He compiled a career record of 153–65–12 as a head football coach and was inducted into the College Football Hall of Fame in 1955. Bierman was also the head basketball coach at Montana (1919–1922), Mississippi A&M (1925–1927), and Tulane (1928–1930), tallying a career college basketball coaching mark of 89–51.

== Early years ==
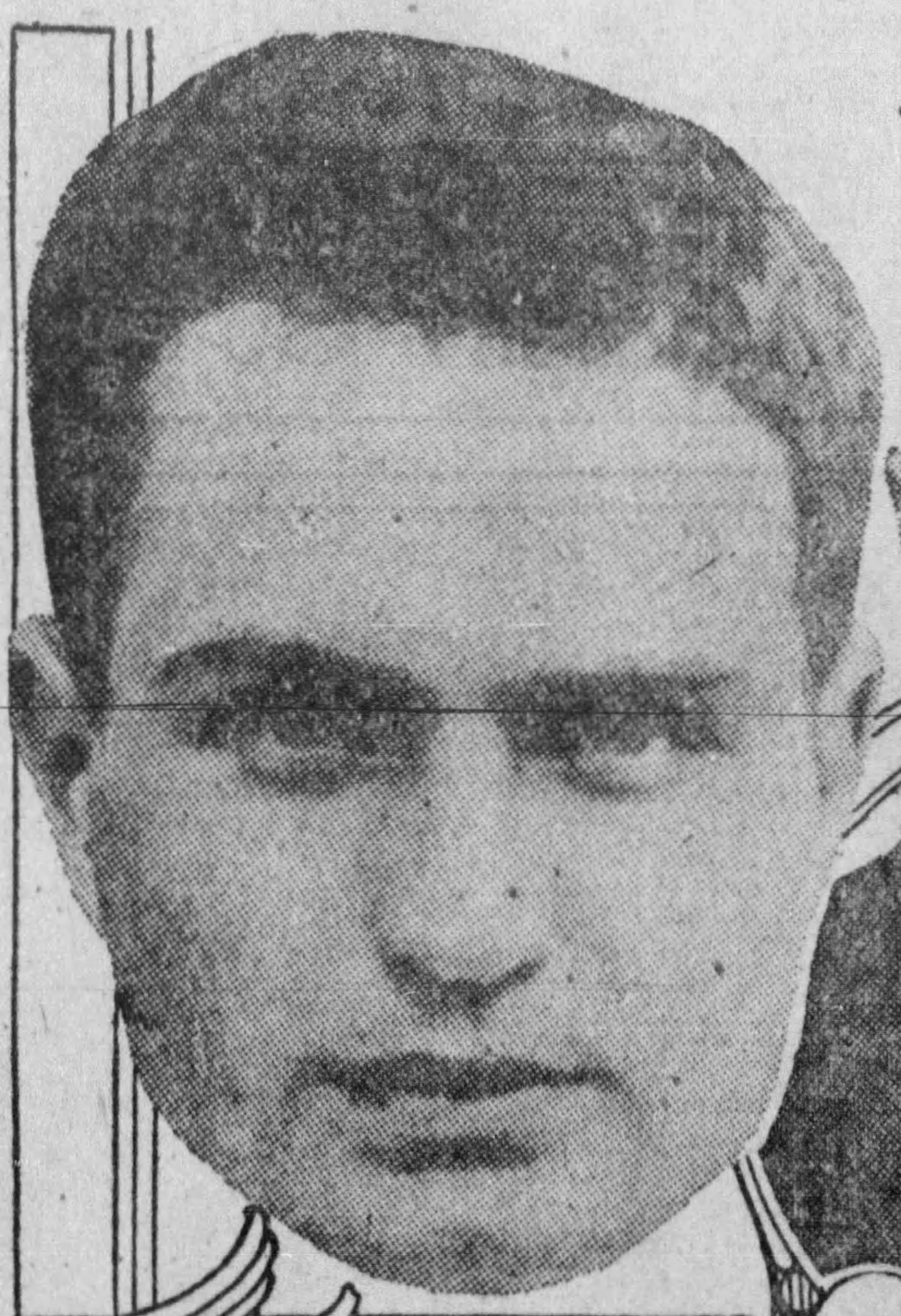
Bierman in 1917

Bierman was born in 1894 to German immigrants on a farm near Springfield, Minnesota. His family moved to Oklahoma when he was a baby, but returned to Minnesota, living in Waseca, Paynesville, Litchfield, and Minneapolis. The family returned to Litchfield in 1908, and it was there that Bierman attended high school and played football, baseball, and track, before graduating in 1912. Bierman's high school athletic success is remarkable given his bout of osteomyelitis which confined him to crutches for 3 years as a boy.

Bierman enrolled at the University of Minnesota in the fall of 1912. He played for the freshman football team in 1912 and for the varsity team in 1913, though a charley horse sidelined him early in the season. He became a starter in 1914, and as a senior, he was captain of the undefeated 1915 Minnesota Golden Gophers football team. He won a total of seven varsity letters at Minnesota, three in football, three in track, and one in basketball.

Bierman was the second of four Bierman brothers to compete in athletics at the University of Minnesota. Older brother Al Bierman played halfback for the football team in 1912 and 1913. George Bierman was the school's top broad jumper. Harlow Bierman was the youngest brother joined the football team in 1917.

== Coaching career ==
=== Montana ===
In the summer of 1916, Bierman accepted a job as the football coach at Butte High School in Butte, Montana. His Butte team outscored opponents by a total of 300 to six and was recognized as the Montana state champion. When the United States entered World War I in April 1917, Bierman enrolled in the United States Marine Corps. He served in the Marines from May 1917 until April 1919. He was promoted to second lieutenant on July 1, 1918, and to captain on July 2, 1918. He spent most of the war in Cuba.

After completing his military service, he was hired in May 1919 as head football, basketball and track coach at the University of Montana. He served as head football coach at Montana from 1919 to 1921. The highlight of his time at Montana was an 18–14 upset victory over Washington in October 1920. In the annual rivalry game with Montana State, Bierman's team's played to a tie in 1919 and won consecutive games in 1920 and 1921. While at Montana, Bierman met his wife Clara McKenzie.

=== Tulane and Mississippi A&M ===
In 1922, Bierman returned to Minnesota working as a municipal bond trader for Wells Dickey. He also coached the football team at Pillsbury Academy in Owatonna, Minnesota.

Bierman later recalled that he "couldn't shake my natural love" for football, and in the summer of 1923, he accepted an offer to become a part-time assistant coach at Tulane University under his Minnesota teammate Clark Shaughnessy. He was an assistant coach for the football, basketball, and track teams at Tulane in 1923 and 1924. He continued to work part-time in the bond business while at Tulane.

In April 1925, he was hired as head football coach and associate professor of physical education at Mississippi A&M. The position was full time, marking the end of Bierman's time in the bond business. Bierman later recalled that football was at a "low ebb" at Mississippi A&M when he took the job and recalled that a highlight of his time there was a close 6–0 loss to the undefeated, national champion 1925 Alabama team. He served as the school's head football coach in 1925 and 1926, compiling an 8–8–1 record.

In April 1927, he was hired as Tulane's head football coach. After two rebuilding years, Bierman's Tulane teams did not lose a conference game and won three consecutive Southern Conference championships from 1929 to 1931. The 1929 Tulane team compiled a perfect 9–0 record; the 1930 team was undefeated in conference games but lost to Big Ten champion Northwestern. In his final year at Tulane, Bierman led the 1931 team to an 11–0 record in the regular season and a No. 2 ranking in the final Dickinson System ratings. The 1931 team won a berth in the 1932 Rose Bowl, losing to No. 1 USC by a 21–12 score.

=== Minnesota ===
==== 1932 to 1941 ====
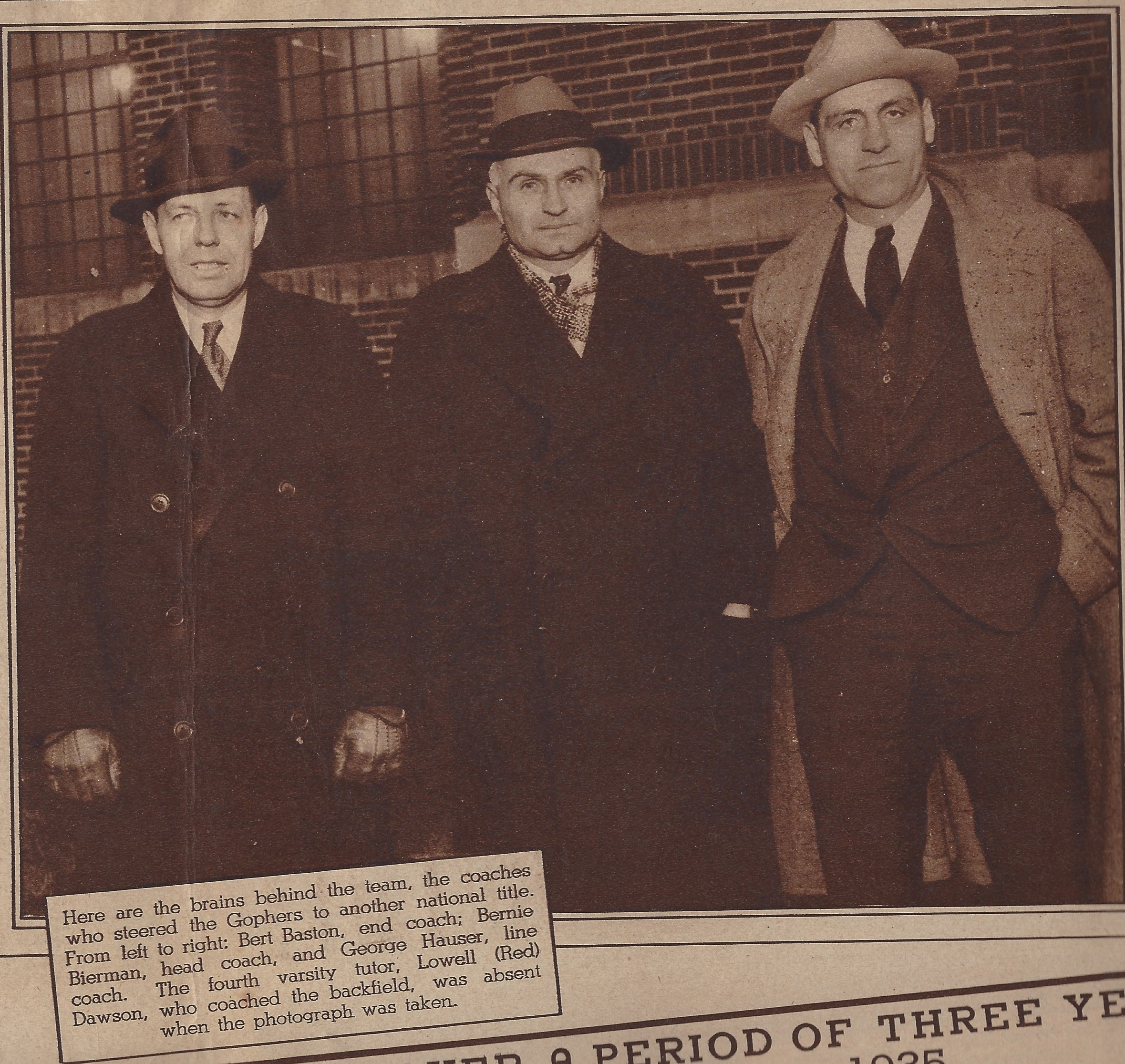
The Minnesota's Golden Gophers, 1935 National Champions, coaches: Bert Baston, end coach; Bernie Bierman, head coach; and George Hauser, line coach. The fourth varsity tutor, Lowek (Red) Dawson, who coached the backfield, was absent when the photograph was taken

In January 1932, Bierman was hired to replace Fritz Crisler as Minnesota's head football coach. After a 5–3 season in 1932, Bierman led Minnesota on a nine-year run from 1933 to 1941 during which they five won national championships (1934, 1935, 1936, 1940, and 1941) and seven Big Ten championships (1933, 1934, 1935, 1937, 1938, 1940, and 1941) and four perfect seasons (1934, 1935, 1940, 1941). Bierman cited the 1934 victory over Pittsburgh as the "high spot" of the season in which the Golden Gophers "blossomed" into a great team.

Bierman coached nine consensus All-Americans between 1934 and 1941: fullback Pug Lund, halfbacks George Franck and Bruce Smith, end Frank Larson, guard Bill Bevan, and tackles Ed Widseth, Dick Smith, Urban Odson, and Dick Wildung.

Bierman published his book, "Winning Football: Strategy, Psychology and Technique", in 1937.

Bierman's pre-war Minnesota dynasties deployed the single wing offensive formation.

==== Wartime military service ====
Bierman continued to serve in the Marine Corps reserves while coaching at Minnesota. Following the attack on Pearl Harbor, Bierman was ordered to report to active duty with the Marines in January 1942. In March 1942, he was named athletic director and head football coach of the Navy's new pre-flight training school at the University of Iowa. He led the 1942 Iowa Pre-Flight Seahawks football team to a 7–3 record and the No. 2 ranking in the AP's Service Poll.

In May 1943, the Navy announced that Bierman had been assigned to sea duty and would not be available to coach Iowa Pre-Flight in 1943. His order to report for sea duty was remanded, and he spent the summer and early fall of 1943 at Marine Corps base in San Diego. In March 1944, he was appointed as the athletic director at the Pensacola Naval Air Station. He was released by the Navy in October 1944.

==== 1945 to 1950 ====
After his discharge from the military, Bierman returned to Minnesota as an advisory football coach in October 1944. He resumed his role as Minnesota's head football coach in 1945 and held that post through the 1950 season. His teams did not compete for championships after the war, and he resigned as head coach in November 1950, as his 1950 team compiled a 1–7–1 record.

==== Overall record and coaching style ====
In 16 years as Minnesota's head football coach, he compiled a 93-35-6 record. He was known for his quiet approach, a coach who "did not believe in whipping his players into an emotional state" before they took the field. His teams ran a single-wing formation behind an unbalanced line, emphasizing a conservative running game with little use of the forward pass.

Bierman was an aloof, intense head coach, whose practices were long and difficult, during which Bierman would talk to the players only to criticize their play.

== Family and later years ==
Bierman remained employed by the University of Minnesota's athletic department until his retirement in the summer of 1959. He was inducted into the College Football Hall of Fame in 1955. He was also inducted into the Minnesota Sports Hall of Fame in 1958, the Louisiana Sports Hall of Fame in 1967, the New Orleans Sports Hall of Fame in 1971, and the University of Minnesota "M" Club Hall of Fame in 1991.

After retiring in 1959, Bierman moved to southern California. During the 1960s, he continued an association with Minnesota as the color commentator on WCCO's radio broadcasts of Minnesota football.

Bierman died on March 7, 1977, at Saddle Community Hospital in Laguna Hills, California, after a long illness. He was survived by his wife Clara and two sons, William A. Bierman and James Bierman.

== Head coaching record ==
=== Football ===
Year	Team	Overall	Conference	Standing	Bowl/playoffs	AP^{#}
Montana Grizzlies (Northwest Conference) (1919–1921)
1919	Montana	2–3–2	0–2–1	T–5th		
1920	Montana	4–3	0–3	7th		
1921	Montana	3–3–1	0–2	6th		
Montana:		9–9–3	0–7–1			
Mississippi A&M Aggies (Southern Conference) (1925–1926)
1925	Mississippi A&M	3–4–1	1–4	T–15th		
1926	Mississippi A&M	5–4	2–3	14th		
Mississippi A&M:		8–8–1	3–7			
Tulane Green Wave (Southern Conference) (1927–1931)
1927	Tulane	2–5–1	2–5–1	18th		
1928	Tulane	6–3–1	3–3–1	T–10th		
1929	Tulane	9–0	6–0	1st		10
1930	Tulane	8–1	5–0	T–1st		11
1931	Tulane	11–1	8–0	T–1st	L Rose	2
Tulane:		36–10–2	24–8–2			
Minnesota Golden Gophers (Big Ten Conference) (1932–1941)
1932	Minnesota	5–3	2–3	6th		
1933	Minnesota	4–0–4	2–0–4	T–1st		
1934	Minnesota	8–0	5–0	T–1st		
1935	Minnesota	8–0	5–0	T–1st		
1936	Minnesota	7–1	4–1	T–2nd		1
1937	Minnesota	6–2	5–0	1st		5
1938	Minnesota	6–2	4–1	1st		10
1939	Minnesota	3–4–1	2–3–1	7th		
1940	Minnesota	8–0	6–0	1st		1
1941	Minnesota	8–0	5–0	1st		1
Iowa Pre-Flight Seahawks (Independent) (1942)
1942	Iowa Pre-Flight	7–3				
Iowa Pre-Flight:		7–3				
Minnesota Golden Gophers (Big Ten Conference) (1945–1950)
1945	Minnesota	4–5	1–5	T–8th		
1946	Minnesota	5–4	3–4	5th		
1947	Minnesota	6–3	3–3	T–3rd		
1948	Minnesota	7–2	5–2	3rd		16
1949	Minnesota	7–2	4–2	3rd		8
1950	Minnesota	1–7–1	1–4–1	7th		
Minnesota:		93–35–6	57–28–6			
Total:		153–65–12				
National championship Conference title Conference division title or championship game berth
^{#}Rankings from final AP Poll.
