= Bill Bevan =

American football player and coach (1913–1975)

- Bevan, c. 1936

Profile
- Position: Guard

Personal information
- Born: March 26, 1913
- Died: August 26, 1975 (aged 62); Hennepin County, Minnesota, U.S.

Career information
- High school: St. Paul Central High School
- College: University of Minnesota

Career history
- 1933–1934: Minnesota

Awards and highlights
- Consensus All-American (1934); First-team All-Big Ten (1934)

William Arnold Bevan, Sr. (March 26, 1913 – August 26, 1975) was an American football player and coach. He played college football at the University of Minnesota and was a consensus selection at the guard position on the 1934 College Football All-America Team.

== Biography ==
He grew up in St. Paul, Minnesota, and graduated from St. Paul Central High School. He then enrolled at the University of Minnesota, where he was a member of the Minnesota Golden Gophers football team under head coach Bernie Bierman. He played at the guard position on Minnesota teams that were undefeated for two consecutive seasons from 1933 to 1934 and was one of four first-team All-Americans on the 1934 Minnesota team that has been recognized as Minnesota's first national championship team. He was a consensus first-team selection for the 1934 College Football All-America Team. He was also a boxer who won the Big Ten Conference boxing championship in the light heavyweight class.

After leaving Minnesota, Bevan was a football coach at Iowa State University, Tulane University, Dartmouth College, and the University of Pittsburgh. During World War II, he served in the United States Army and attained the rank of lieutenant colonel. After the war, Bevan pursued a career in business. He also volunteered as a coach at Chisago City High School Chisago City, Minnesota, Shattuck, and Carleton College. He died in 1975.
