= 1934 Ohio State Buckeyes football team =

American college football season

1934 Ohio State Buckeyes football
- Conference: Big Ten Conference
- Record: 7–1 (5–1 Big Ten)
- Head coach: Francis Schmidt (1st season)
- Home stadium: Ohio Stadium

1934 Big Ten Conference football standings
	Conf.					Overall
Team	W		L		T	W		L		T
No. 1 Minnesota $	5	–	0	–	0	8	–	0	–	0
No. 9 Ohio State	5	–	1	–	0	7	–	1	–	0
No. 6 Illinois	4	–	1	–	0	7	–	1	–	0
Purdue	3	–	1	–	0	5	–	3	–	0
Wisconsin	2	–	3	–	0	4	–	4	–	0
Northwestern	2	–	3	–	0	3	–	5	–	0
Chicago	2	–	4	–	0	4	–	4	–	0
Indiana	1	–	3	–	1	3	–	3	–	2
Iowa	1	–	3	–	1	2	–	5	–	1
Michigan	0	–	6	–	0	1	–	7	–	0
$ – Conference champion; Rankings from Associated Press

The 1934 Ohio State Buckeyes football team' was an American football team that represented Ohio State University as a member of the Big Ten Conference during the 1934 college football season. In their first year under head coach Francis Schmidt, the team compiled a 7–1 record.

Conference rival Chicago returned to Ohio State's schedule for the first time since 1927.

== Schedule ==
Date	Opponent	Site	Result	Attendance	Source
October 6	Indiana	Ohio Stadium; Columbus, OH	W 33–0	47,736	
October 13	at Illinois	Memorial Stadium; Champaign, IL (Illibuck)	L 13–14	24,831	
October 20	Colgate*	Ohio Stadium; Columbus, Ohio	W 10–7	29,139	
October 27	at Northwestern	Dyche Stadium; Evanston, IL	W 28–6	25,360	
November 3	at Western Reserve*	League Park; Cleveland, OH	W 76–0	11,890	
November 10	Chicago	Ohio Stadium; Columbus, OH	W 33–0	32,227	
November 17	Michigan	Ohio Stadium; Columbus, OH (rivalry)	W 34–0	68,678	
November 24	Iowa	Ohio Stadium; Columbus, OH	W 40–7	27,414	
*Non-conference game
