= Dick Crayne =

American football player and coach (1913–1985)

- Crayne as a senior for Iowa in 1935

No. 15
- Position: Fullback

Personal information
- Born: April 24, 1913; West Chester, Iowa, U.S.
- Died: August 14, 1985 (aged 72); Sioux City, Iowa, U.S.
- Listed height: 6 ft 0 in (1.83 m)
- Listed weight: 205 lb (93 kg)

Career information
- High school: Fairfield (Fairfield, Iowa)
- College: Iowa
- NFL draft: 1936: 1st round, 4th overall pick

Career history

Playing
- Brooklyn Dodgers (1936–1937)

Coaching
- Kansas (1938) (Backfield); Westmar (1939–1951) (Head coach)

Awards and highlights
- Third-team All-American (1935); 3× Second-team All-Big Ten (1933, 1934, 1935)

Career NFL statistics
- Passing yards: 72
- Rushing yards: 338
- Rushing average: 3
- Total touchdowns: 1
- Stats at Pro Football Reference

Richard Cherry Crayne (April 24, 1913 – August 14, 1985) was an American professional football fullback for the Brooklyn Dodgers of the National Football League (NFL). He was drafted in the first round with the fourth overall pick in the 1936 NFL Draft. He played in 1936, rushing for 203 yards and one touchdown, and completed 1 of 2 passes for 52 yards. Then in 1937, rushing for 135 yards, and completed 2 of 4 passes for 20 yards. In 1935, he was selected as a third-team All-American by both the United Press and the Associated Press while playing for the University of Iowa. Crayne served as the head football coach at Westmar University in Le Mars, Iowa from 1939 to 1951. He died on August 14, 1985, at a hospital in Sioux City, Iowa.

== NFL career statistics ==
Year	Team	Games		Rushing					Receiving					Passing							Fumbles	
Year	Team	GP	GS	Att	Yds	Avg	Lng	TD	Rec	Yds	Avg	Lng	TD	Cmp	Att	Pct	Yds	TD	Int	Rtg	Fum	Lost
1936	BKN	12	12	64	203	3.2	-	1	1	32	32.0	32	0	1	2	50.0	52	0	0	95.8	-	-
1937	BKN	10	4	47	135	2.9	-	0	1	4	4.0	-	0	2	4	50.0	20	0	0	64.6	-	-
Career		22	16	111	338	3.0	-	1	2	36	18.0	-	0	3	6	50.0	72	0	0	93.7	-	-

== Head coaching record ==
Year	Team	Overall	Conference	Standing	Bowl/playoffs
Western Union / Westmar Eagles (Iowa Conference) (1939–1959)
1939	Western Union	6–2–1	2–2	T–8th	
1940	Western Union	7–1	2–1	4th	
1941	Western Union	3–4–1	1–2–1	9th	
1942	Western Union	0–4–1	0–1–1	10th	
1943	No team—World War II				
1944	No team—World War II				
1945	No team—World War II				
1946	Western Union	5–2	0–1	T–11th	
1947	Western Union	3–2–2	1–0	3rd	
1948	Westmar	2–6–1	0–1	10th	
1949	Westmar	4–4	1–1	6th	
1950	Westmar	3–6	2–3	4th (Northern)	
1951	Westmar	1–6–1	0–5	6th (Northern)	
Western Union / Westmar:		34–37–7	9–17–2		
Total:		34–37–7			
