= Regis Monahan =

American football player (1908–1979)

- Monahan in 1936

No. 19, 30
- Positions: Guard, kicker

Personal information
- Born: November 15, 1908; Pittsburgh, Pennsylvania, U.S.
- Died: April 23, 1979 (aged 70); Royal Oak, Michigan, U.S.
- Listed height: 5 ft 10 in (1.78 m)
- Listed weight: 216 lb (98 kg)

Career information
- High school: Pittsburgh (PA) St. Rosalia; The Kiski School
- College: Ohio State

Career history
- Detroit Lions (1935–1938); Chicago Cardinals (1939)

Awards and highlights
- NFL champion (1935); First-team All-American (1934); First-team All-Big Ten (1934)

Career statistics
- Games played: 44
- Starts: 9
- Stats at Pro Football Reference

John Regins "Monty" Monahan (November 15, 1908 – April 23, 1979), was an American professional football player in the National Football League (NFL). He played college football for the Ohio State Buckeyes.

== College career ==
A native of Pittsburgh's Greenfield neighborhood, Monahan traveled to Ohio State where he played for the Buckeyes. He was a guard and tackle who doubled as a kicker. In 1934 he became captain of the Buckeyes and an All-American.

== Professional career ==
Monahan played four seasons with the Detroit Lions from 1935 until 1938. He was part of the 1935 Lions team that won the NFL championship. Monahan played two additional games with the Chicago Cardinals during the 1939 NFL season.
