= 1934 Indiana Hoosiers football team =

American college football season

1934 Indiana Hoosiers football
- Conference: Big Ten Conference
- Record: 3–3–2 (1–3–1 Big Ten)
- Head coach: Bo McMillin (1st season)
- MVP: Don Veller
- Captain: Jack Sprauer
- Home stadium: Memorial Stadium

1934 Big Ten Conference football standings
| | Conf. | | | | | Overall |
| Team | W | | L | | T | W | | L | | T |
|---|---|---|---|---|---|---|---|---|---|---|
| No. 1 Minnesota $ | 5 | – | 0 | – | 0 | 8 | – | 0 | – | 0 |
| No. 9 Ohio State | 5 | – | 1 | – | 0 | 7 | – | 1 | – | 0 |
| No. 6 Illinois | 4 | – | 1 | – | 0 | 7 | – | 1 | – | 0 |
| Purdue | 3 | – | 1 | – | 0 | 5 | – | 3 | – | 0 |
| Wisconsin | 2 | – | 3 | – | 0 | 4 | – | 4 | – | 0 |
| Northwestern | 2 | – | 3 | – | 0 | 3 | – | 5 | – | 0 |
| Chicago | 2 | – | 4 | – | 0 | 4 | – | 4 | – | 0 |
| Indiana | 1 | – | 3 | – | 1 | 3 | – | 3 | – | 2 |
| Iowa | 1 | – | 3 | – | 1 | 2 | – | 5 | – | 1 |
| Michigan | 0 | – | 6 | – | 0 | 1 | – | 7 | – | 0 |
$ – Conference champion; Rankings from Associated Press

The 1934 Indiana Hoosiers football team represented the Indiana Hoosiers in the 1934 college football season. The participated as members of the Big Ten Conference. The Hoosiers played their home games at Memorial Stadium in Bloomington, Indiana. The team was coached by Bo McMillin, in his first year as head coach of the Hoosiers.

== Schedule ==
| Date | Opponent | Site | Result | Attendance | Source |
|---|---|---|---|---|---|
| September 29 | Ohio* | Memorial Stadium; Bloomington, IN | W 27–0 | 10,000 | |
| October 6 | at Ohio State | Ohio Stadium; Columbus, OH | L 0–33 | 47,736 | |
| October 13 | at Temple* | Temple Stadium; Philadelphia, PA | T 6–6 | 18,000 | |
| October 20 | at Chicago | Stagg Field; Chicago, IL | L 0–21 | 12,000 | |
| November 3 | Iowa | Memorial Stadium; Bloomington, IN | T 0–0 | 10,000 | |
| November 10 | at Minnesota | Memorial Stadium; Minneapolis, MN | L 0–30 | 28,100 | |
| November 17 | Maryland* | Memorial Stadium; Bloomington, IN | W 17–14 | 6,000 | |
| November 24 | at Purdue | Ross–Ade Stadium; West Lafayette, IN (Old Oaken Bucket) | W 17–6 | 24,000 | |
*Non-conference game
