= 1934 Chicago Maroons football team =

American college football season

1934 Chicago Maroons football
- Conference: Big Ten Conference
- Record: 4–4 (2–4 Big Ten)
- Head coach: Clark Shaughnessy (2nd season)
- Home stadium: Stagg Field

1934 Big Ten Conference football standings
	Conf.					Overall
Team	W		L		T	W		L		T
No. 1 Minnesota $	5	–	0	–	0	8	–	0	–	0
No. 9 Ohio State	5	–	1	–	0	7	–	1	–	0
No. 6 Illinois	4	–	1	–	0	7	–	1	–	0
Purdue	3	–	1	–	0	5	–	3	–	0
Wisconsin	2	–	3	–	0	4	–	4	–	0
Northwestern	2	–	3	–	0	3	–	5	–	0
Chicago	2	–	4	–	0	4	–	4	–	0
Indiana	1	–	3	–	1	3	–	3	–	2
Iowa	1	–	3	–	1	2	–	5	–	1
Michigan	0	–	6	–	0	1	–	7	–	0
$ – Conference champion; Rankings from Associated Press

The 1934 Chicago Maroons football team was an American football team that represented the University of Chicago during the 1934 college football season. In their second season under head coach Clark Shaughnessy, the Maroons compiled a 4–4 record, finished in seventh place in the Big Ten Conference, and outscored their opponents by a combined total of 113 to 106.

Conference rival Ohio State returned to Chicago's schedule for the first time since 1927.

== Schedule ==
Date	Opponent	Site	Result	Attendance	Source
September 29	Carroll (WI)*	Stagg Field; Chicago, IL	W 19–0	25,000	
October 13	Michigan	Stagg Field; Chicago, IL (rivalry)	W 27–0	25,000	
October 20	Indiana	Stagg Field; Chicago, IL	W 21–0	12,000	
October 27	Missouri*	Stagg Field; Chicago, IL	W 19–6	10,000	
November 3	Purdue	Stagg Field; Chicago, IL (rivalry)	L 20–26	32,000	
November 10	at Ohio State	Ohio Stadium; Columbus, OH	L 0–33	32,227	
November 17	at Minnesota	Memorial Stadium; Minneapolis, MN	L 7–35	46,000	
November 24	Illinois	Stagg Field; Chicago, IL	L 0–6	29,828	
*Non-conference game
