= Albert Kawal =

American athlete and coach (1912–1990)

Biographical details
- Born: July 4, 1912; Cicero, Illinois, U.S.
- Died: January 1, 1990 (aged 77); Clearwater, Florida, U.S.

Playing career

Football
- 1932–1934: Northwestern

Basketball
- 1933–1935: Northwestern
- Positions: Guard (football); Guard (basketball)

Coaching career (HC unless noted)

Football
- 1936–1940: Boston University (assistant)
- 1941–1943: Michigan State (line)
- 1946: Michigan State (line)
- 1947–1948: Drake
- 1949–1954: Temple
- 1955–1958: Southern Illinois
- 1960–1961: Tulane (line)
- 1962: Lafayette (assistant)
- 1963–1964: Tulsa (assistant)

Baseball
- 1964: Tulsa

Head coaching record
- Overall: 52–53–6 (football); 10–12 (baseball)
- Bowls: 1–0

Accomplishments and honors

Awards
- Second-team All-Big Ten (1933)

Albert Peter Kawal (July 4, 1912 – January 1, 1990) was an American football and basketball player and coach of football, basketball, and baseball. He served as the head football coach at Drake University (1947–1948), Temple University (1949–1954), and Southern Illinois University Carbondale (1960–1961), compiling a career college football record of 52–53–6. Kawal was also the head baseball coach at the University of Tulsa in 1964, tallying a mark of 10–12. He played football and basketball at Northwestern University

== Coaching career ==
=== Drake ===
Kawal got his first head coaching job as the 16th head football coach at Drake University in Des Moines, Iowa and he held that position for two seasons, from 1947 until 1948. His record at Drake was 8–10–1.

=== Temple ===
Kawal he was the 15th head football coach at Temple University in Philadelphia and he held that position for six seasons, from 1949 until 1954. His record at Temple was 24–28–3.

=== Southern Illinois ===
Kawal was the eighth head football coach at Southern Illinois University Carbondale and served there four seasons, from 1955 until 1958. His record at Southern Illinois was 20–15–2.

== Personal life ==
Kawal was born on July 4, 1912, in Cicero, Illinois, to Peter and Martha (Yuknis) Kawal. On April 28, 1936, in Boston, he married Almyra P Wilcox (died August 26, 1951). On January 1, 1937, their daughter, Martha Allison Kawal (died September 9, 2011), was born in Boston. In 1952 he married Mary Louise Clifford (died July 30, 1999). He and Mary retired from Philadelphia to Safety Harbor, Florida in 1976. Kawal died on January 1, 1990, at Clearwater Community Hospital in Clearwater, Florida. His brother, Ed Kawal, played professional football for the NFL Chicago bears and Washington Redskins.

== Head coaching record ==
=== Football ===
Year	Team	Overall	Conference	Standing	Bowl/playoffs
Drake Bulldogs (Missouri Valley Conference) (1947–1948)
1947	Drake	1–7–1	1–3	4th	
1948	Drake	7–3	1–1	3rd	W Salad
Drake:		8–10–1	2–4		
Temple Owls (Independent) (1949–1954)
1949	Temple	5–4			
1950	Temple	4–4–1			
1951	Temple	6–4			
1952	Temple	2–7–1			
1953	Temple	4–4–1			
1954	Temple	3–5			
Drake:		24–28–3			
Southern Illinois Salukis (Interstate Intercollegiate Athletic Conference) (1955–1958)
1955	Southern Illinois	4–4–2	4–1–1	3rd	
1956	Southern Illinois	4–5	3–3	T–3rd	
1957	Southern Illinois	5–4	3–3	T–4th	
1958	Southern Illinois	7–2	4–2	T–2nd	
Southern Illinois:		20–15–2	14–9–1		
Total:		52–53–6			

=== College baseball ===
Record table
Season	Team	Overall	Conference	Standing	Postseason
Tulsa Golden Hurricane (Missouri Valley Conference) (1964)
1964	Tulsa	10–12			
Tulsa:		10–12 (.455)			
Total:		10–12 (.455)			
