= Bob Tenner =

American football player (1913–1984)

No. 36
- Position: End

Personal information
- Born: June 1, 1913; Minneapolis, Minnesota, U.S.
- Died: November 16, 1984 (aged 71); Minneapolis, Minnesota, U.S.
- Listed height: 6 ft 0 in (1.83 m)
- Listed weight: 212 lb (96 kg)

Career information
- High school: West (MN)
- College: Minnesota

Career history
- Green Bay Packers (1935)

Awards and highlights
- First-team All-Big Ten (1934)

Career statistics
- Receptions: 3
- Receiving yards: 38
- Touchdowns: 0
- Stats at Pro Football Reference

Robert Johnson Tenner (June 1, 1913 – November 16, 1984) was an American football end for the Green Bay Packers of the National Football League (NFL). Tenner played collegiate ball for the University of Minnesota and played professionally for one season, in 1935.
