= Jack Beynon =

American football player (1913–1989)

Illinois Fighting Illini
- Position: Quarterback

Personal information
- Born: July 12, 1913; Chicago, Illinois, U.S.
- Died: October 17, 1989 (aged 76)

Career information
- High school: Rockford Central (IL)
- College: University of Illinois (1932–1934)

Awards and highlights
- Second-team All-American (1934); 2× First-team All-Big Ten (1933, 1934)

John True Beynon (July 12, 1913 – October 17, 1989) was an American football player. He was the quarterback for the Illinois Fighting Illini football team from 1932 to 1934 and was selected as a first-team All-Big Ten player in 1933 and 1934.

== Early life ==
Beynon was born in Chicago in 1913 and grew up in Rockford, Illinois.

== University of Illinois ==
Beynon attended the University of Illinois. He was the quarterback of the Illinois Fighting Illini football team from 1932 to 1934. He was selected as a first-team player on the 1933 and 1934 All-Big Ten Conference football teams. He was also selected in 1934 as a second-team All-American by Red Grange Universal Service and a third-team All-American by the Newspaper Enterprise Association.

== Later life ==
In 1935, Beynon was hired as an assistant football coach at Drake. He later attended law school at the University of Illinois and served as a backfield coach and radio sports announcer during law school. He interrupted his legal career to serve in the military during World War II. He became the first public defender in Winnebago County, Illinois, in 1966, and later became an Illinois state court judge. He died in 1989.
