= James Carter (coach) =

American basketball coach (1911–2012)

Emmett Lowery
Biographical details
- Born: November 12, 1911; Indianapolis, Indiana, U.S.
- Died: May 9, 2012 (aged 100); Fishers, Indiana, U.S.

Playing career

Football
- 1932–1934: Purdue
- Position: Halfback

Coaching career (HC unless noted)

Football
- 1936–1938: Mankato State
- 1939–?: Dayton (assistant)

Basketball
- 1939–1947: Dayton

Head coaching record
- Overall: 11–11–1 (football); 41–73 (basketball)

Accomplishments and honors

Championships
- Football; 1 NTAC (1938)

James Emerson Carter (November 12, 1911 – May 9, 2012) was an American football and basketball coach. He served as the head basketball coach at the University of Dayton from 1939 to 1947.

Carter came to Dayton when head football coach Harry Baujan hired him as an assistant football coach. Carter, a Purdue University graduate and varsity football standout, had no experience with basketball, but was nonetheless installed as the head basketball coach for the 1939–40 season. Although he had to share football responsibilities with his new basketball duties, Carter quickly moved to expand the Flyers' profile. In his first season, he scheduled an ambitious five game east coast road trip against such prominent teams as Rhode Island, St Joseph's, St John's and Long Island University. Later, he scheduled other high-profile opponent such as Kentucky and Ohio during his coaching tenure. Carter is noted for starting an African American player on his 1946–47 squad. Carter led the Flyers to winning records in his third and fourth seasons, but the two year World War II suspension between 1943 and 1945 derailed this progress. Following consecutive 3–13 and 4–17 seasons, the university decided to hire Tom Blackburn as its full-time basketball coach in 1947. Carter's six season record was 41–75. Carter lived in Anderson, Indiana and was recognized as the oldest living Purdue Boilermaker in 2011.

Carter also served as the head football coach at Mankato State University in Mankato, Minnesota from 1936 to 1938.

== Head coaching record ==
=== Football ===
Year	Team	Overall	Conference	Standing	Bowl/playoffs
Mankato State Indians (Northern Teachers Athletic Conference) (1936–1938)
1936	Mankato State	5–2	2–1	T–2nd	
1937	Mankato State	1–7	1–2	5th	
1938	Mankato State	5–2–1	3–0	T–1st	
Mankato State:		11–11–1	6–3		
Total:		11–11–1			
National championship Conference title Conference division title or championship game berth
