= Noble Kizer =

American football player and coach (1900–1940)

- Kizer pictured in Debris 1931, Purdue yearbook

Biographical details
- Born: March 11, 1900 near Plymouth, Indiana, U.S.
- Died: June 13, 1940 (aged 40); Lafayette, Indiana, U.S.

Playing career

Football
- 1922–1924: Notre Dame

Basketball
- 1924–1925: Notre Dame
- Position: Guard (football)

Coaching career (HC unless noted)

Football
- 1925–1929: Purdue (assistant)
- 1930–1936: Purdue

Administrative career (AD unless noted)
- 1933–1940: Purdue

Head coaching record
- Overall: 42–13–3

Accomplishments and honors

Championships
- 2 Big Ten (1931–1932)

Noble Earl "Nobe" Kizer Sr. (March 11, 1900 – June 13, 1940) was an American football and basketball player, football coach, and college athletics administrator. He served as the head football coach at Purdue University from 1930 to 1936. During his tenure as head coach, he won two Big Ten Conference titles and compiled a record of 42–13–3. Kizer was also the athletic director from 1933 until his death in 1940.

From 1922 to 1924, Kizer played right guard at Notre Dame under Knute Rockne. In 1925, he became an assistant coach at Purdue under James Phelan and inherited the head coaching position upon Phelan's departure for the University of Washington.

Kizer served in the United States Marines Corps during World War I. He died on June 13, 1940, in Lafayette, Indiana from a kidney ailment and high blood pressure.

== Head coaching record ==
Year	Team	Overall	Conference	Standing	Bowl/playoffs
Purdue Boilermakers (Big Ten Conference) (1930–1936)
1930	Purdue	6–2	4–2	3rd	
1931	Purdue	9–1	5–1	T–1st	
1932	Purdue	7–0–1	5–0–1	T–1st	
1933	Purdue	6–1–1	3–1–1	4th	
1934	Purdue	5–3	3–1	4th	
1935	Purdue	4–4	3–3	T–3rd	
1936	Purdue	5–2–1	3–1–1	T–4th	
Purdue:		42–13–3	26–9–3		
Total:		42–13–3			
National championship Conference title Conference division title or championship game berth
