= Stan Kostka =

American football player and coach (1912–1997)

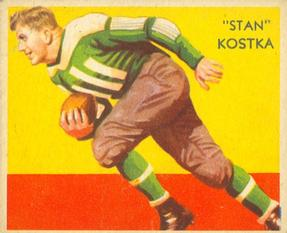
- Kostka c. 1935

No. 30
- Positions: Fullback, linebacker

Personal information
- Born: July 8, 1912; Inver Grove Heights, Minnesota, U.S.
- Died: February 3, 1997 (aged 84); Fargo, North Dakota, U.S.
- Listed height: 6 ft 0 in (1.83 m)
- Listed weight: 225 lb (102 kg)

Career information
- High school: South St. Paul (South St. Paul, Minnesota)
- College: Oregon (1931); Minnesota (1932–1934)

Career history

Playing
- Brooklyn Dodgers (1935)

Coaching
- North Dakota Agricultural/State (1941; 1946–1947) Head coach

Awards and highlights
- National champion (1934); Second-team All-American (1934); Second-team All-Big Ten (1934)

Career statistics
- Rushing yards: 249
- Rushing average: 4
- Receptions: 1
- Receiving yards: 9
- Stats at Pro Football Reference

Head coaching record
- Career: 8–17 (.320)

Stanislaus Clarence Kostka (July 8, 1912 – February 3, 1997) was an American football player and coach. He played college football with the Oregon Webfoots for a season, then he transferred to the Minnesota Golden Gophers and was a member of the 1934 national champion team. Kostka played professionally in the National Football League for the Brooklyn Dodgers for a lone season in 1935. He served as the head football coach at North Dakota Agricultural College—now known as North Dakota State University—in 1941 and from 1946 to 1947, compiling a record of 8–17. He was also the head baseball coach at North Dakota Agricultural in 1947, tallying a mark of 5–3.

Kostka served as a lieutenant commander in the United States Navy during World War II.

Kostka, a squarely built 6-foot, 225-pounder who only played one year, received offers from the Chicago Bears, Green Bay Packers, New York Giants, Pittsburgh Steelers, and the Dodgers. He recalled that "a team would send me a wire and say they'd give me $3,500". He later said: "I'd send a wire back and say Green Bay or the Chicago Bears said they'd give me $4,000. I kept that up". Kostka eventually culminated the bargaining by signing a $5,000 contract, along with a $500 bonus, with Brooklyn. "That was a big deal then", said Kostka. "I think like Nagurski was in the league about three years and making $400 or less. Most of the guys were making $50 a ball game".

== Head coaching record ==
=== Football ===
Year	Team	Overall	Conference	Standing	Bowl/playoffs
North Dakota Agricultural Bison (North Central Conference) (1941)
1941	North Dakota Agricultural	2–7	2–4	5th	
North Dakota Agricultural/State Bison (North Central Conference) (1946–1947)
1946	North Dakota Agricultural	5–3	4–1	2nd	
1947	North Dakota State	1–7	0–5	7th	
North Dakota Agricultural:		8–17	6–10		
Total:		8–17			
