= Pug Lund =

American football player (1913–1994)

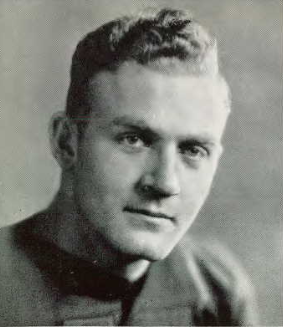
- Lund from 1935 University of Minnesota yearbook

Profile
- Position: Halfback

Personal information
- Born: April 18, 1913; Rice Lake, Wisconsin, U.S.
- Died: May 26, 1994 (aged 81); Minneapolis, Minnesota, U.S.

Career information
- College: Minnesota (1932–1934)

Awards and highlights
- National champion (1934); Consensus All-American (1934); First-team All-American (1933); Chicago Tribune Silver Football (1934); 2× First-team All-Big Ten (1933, 1934); Second-team All-Big Ten (1932)
- College Football Hall of Fame (Class of 1958)

Francis LeRoy "Pug" Lund (April 18, 1913 – May 26, 1994) was an American football player. He played college football as a halfback for Minnesota Golden Gophers and won All-Big Ten Conference honors in both 1933 and in 1934. He was captain of the 1934 Minnesota Golden Gophers football team that compiled a perfect 8–0 record and won the national championship. He won the Chicago Tribune Silver Football trophy as the most valuable player in the conference in 1934 and was also a consensus first-team player on the 1934 All-America college football team. Lund was elected to the College Football Hall of Fame in 1958.

== Early life ==
Lund was born in 1913 at Rice Lake, Wisconsin. He attended Rice Lake High School where he was captain of the track, football, and basketball teams.

== University of Minnesota ==
Lund enrolled at the University of Minnesota in the fall of 1931. He received the nickname "Pug" when a reporter commented that "Francis" was "a helluva name" for a football player and asked if he had a nickname. Someone yelled out "Call him Pug", and when the story appeared in the paper, it included his photo with the caption "Pug Lund".

As a sophomore in 1932, Lund played for Minnesota's varsity football team and became a triple-threat man. He emerged as a star in his first game for the Gophers, setting up the winning touchdown on a pass to Brad Robinson and then rushing ten yards for the score. On November 5, 1932, he gained 241 rushing yards on 28 carries against Ole Miss. He was selected as a second-team back on the 1932 All-Big Ten Conference football team.

As a junior in 1933, Lund became one of the country's biggest football stars. He gained more yards from scrimmage (682) than the entire opposition in Minnesota's eight games. He was selected by both the Associated Press (AP) and United Press (UP) at a first-team halfback on the All-Big Ten team. He also won first-team All-America honors from the AP, the Football Writers Association of America (FWAA), the Hearst newspaper, and the Central Press Association (CP).

As a senior, Lund was the captain and most valuable player of the 1934 Minnesota Golden Gophers football team that compiled an 8–0 record won the Big Ten championship, outscored opponents by a total of 270 to 38, and was recognized as the national champion. Lund was a consensus pick for both the 1934 All-Big Ten Conference football team and the 1934 All-America college football team.

At the end of his college career in November 1934, Lund rejected offers to play professional football. Asked about the prospect of playing professional football, Lund responded, "Not on your life."

In February 1935, Lund received the Chicago Tribune Silver Football as the most valuable player in the Big Ten Conference. That same month, Lund's father became seriously ill, and Lund dropped out of the university to return home to Rice Lake.

Lund also competed in track and field at Minnesota.

== Family and later years ==
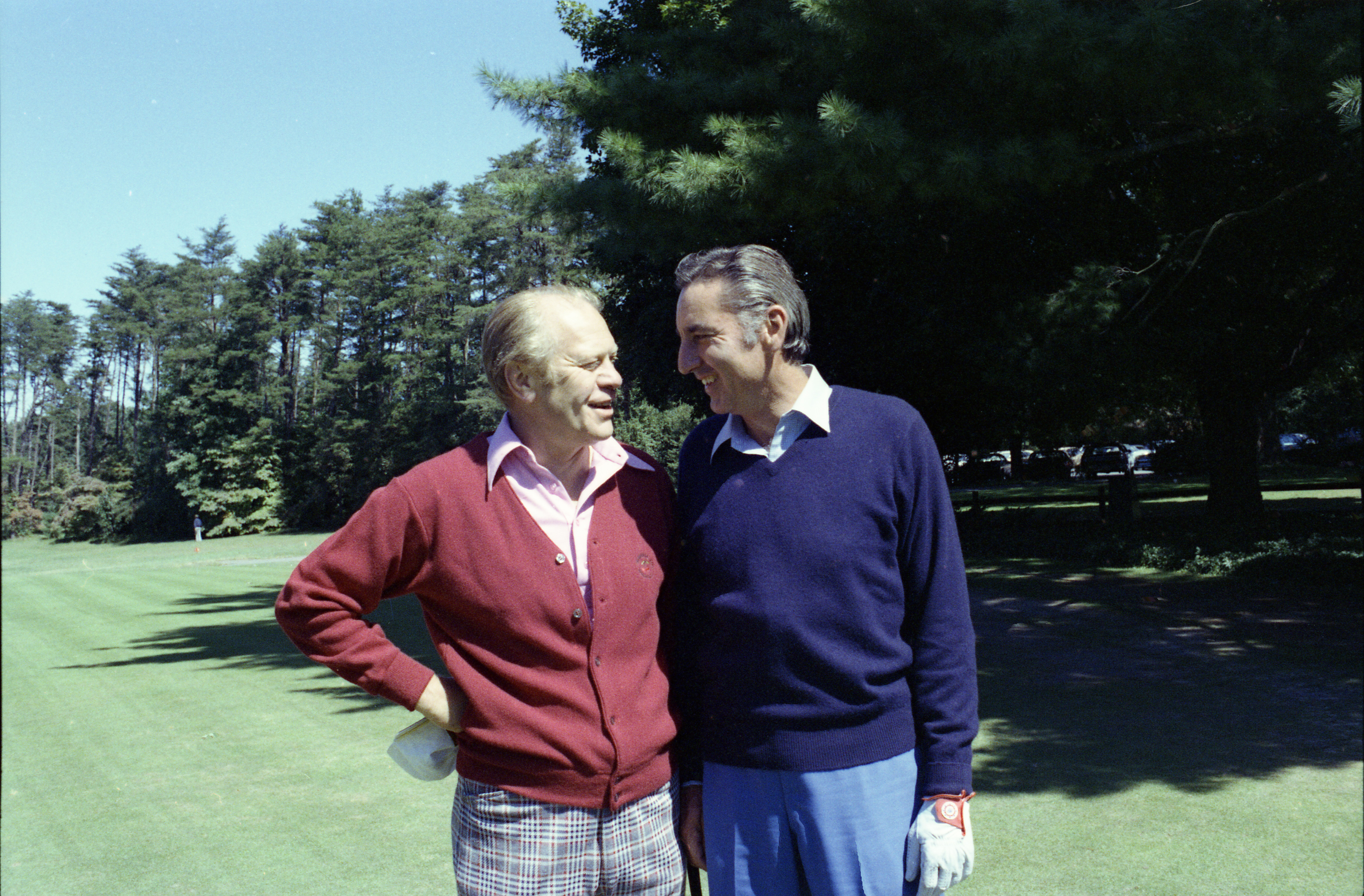
Lund (right) with President Gerald R. Ford in 1975

Lund married Margaret Griffiths in 1936. They had three children.

After his playing career, Lund worked as a sales promotion manager for Ford Motor Company in Minneapolis. He joined New England Mutual Life Insurance Company in 1943 but his career was interrupted with military service during World War II. He served in the Army as part of an infantry unit in the Philippines in 1945. After the war, he lived in Edina, Minnesota, and worked in the life insurance business.

Lund was inducted into the College Football Hall of Fame (then known as the National Football Foundation and Hall of Fame) in 1958.

In the spring of 1993, at age 80, Lund graduated from the University of Minnesota with a degree in education. He received the degree 62 years after enrolling at the university. At the commencement ceremony, it was announced that he had started school in 1931. He was also inducted in 1991 into the University of Minnesota's "M Club Hall of Fame".

For the final seven years of his life, Lund lived in Walker Place in Minneapolis. In 1994, Lund died at age 81 of heart failure at Abbott Northwestern Hospital in Minneapolis. He was buried in Lakewood Cemetery.
