= Bud Lindberg =

American basketball player (1909–1981)

Personal information
- Born: September 13, 1909 Fort Wayne, Indiana
- Died: February 26, 1981 (aged 71) Fort Wayne, Indiana
- Listed height: 6 ft 0 in (1.83 m)
- Listed weight: 175 lb (79 kg)

Career information
- College: Illinois (1933–1936)
- Position: Guard

Career history
- 1930–1931: Fort Wayne Hoosiers
- 1937–1938: Fort Wayne General Electrics

Walter George "Bud" Lindenberg (September 13, 1909 – February 26, 1981) was an American professional basketball player. He played in the National Basketball League for the Fort Wayne General Electrics in 1937–38. He had also played for the Fort Wayne Hoosiers in the American Basketball League during 1930–31.
