= Willis Ward =

Track and field athlete and American football player

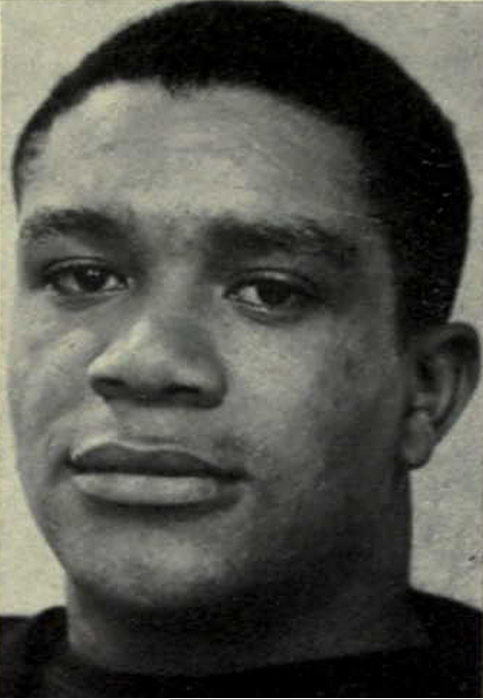
- Ward, c. 1934

No. 61
- Position: End

Personal information
- Born: December 28, 1912; Gadsden, Alabama, U.S.
- Died: December 30, 1983 (aged 71); Detroit, Michigan, U.S.
- Listed height: 6 ft 1 in (1.85 m)
- Listed weight: 185 lb (84 kg)

Career information
- High school: Northwestern
- College: Michigan (1932–1934)

Awards and highlights
- National champion (1933)

Willis Franklin Ward (December 28, 1912 – December 30, 1983) was an American track and field athlete, college football player, lawyer, and judge who was inducted into the University of Michigan Athletic Hall of Honor in 1981.

Ward was the Michigan High School Athlete of the Year, after setting a national prep record in the high jump. At the University of Michigan, he was a collegiate champion in the high jump, the long jump, the 100-yard dash, and the 440-yard dash, and finished second in the voting for the Associated Press Big Ten Athlete of the Year award in 1933. In track and field he was a three-time All-American and eight-time Big Ten champion.

In football, Ward was only the second African-American to win a varsity letter for the Michigan Wolverines football team, lettering in 1932, 1933, and 1934. In 1934, a controversy developed when Georgia Tech refused to play if Ward took the field, and university officials opted to keep Ward out of the game. Teammate Gerald R. Ford reportedly threatened to quit the team in response to the university's decision. After being excluded from the Georgia Tech game, Ward went on to score all 12 of Michigan's points that year outside of the Georgia Tech game, without another Wolverine even having an extra point or a field goal.

Ward later became a lawyer in Detroit. He worked for the Ford Motor Company through the early 1940s. He was a member of the Michigan Public Service Commission from 1966 to 1973, serving as chairman from 1969 to 1973. He also served as a probate court judge in Wayne County, Michigan.

== Early life ==
Ward was born in Alabama in 1912. His father, Henry R. Ward, was an Alabama native who moved to Detroit and worked there in a Ford Motor Company factory. His mother, Bessie, was a Georgia native.

Ward attended Detroit's Northwestern High School where he excelled in both track and football. As a high school junior, he was named Michigan High School Athlete of the Year, after setting a national prep record in the high jump at 6–4.5. He was city champion in the low hurdles (with a time of 13.0) and the high hurdles (with a time of 15.8). Ward also won the 220 hurdles at Ann Arbor (with a time of 25.9) and Class A (with a time of 26.1).

== University of Michigan ==
=== Freshman track star ===
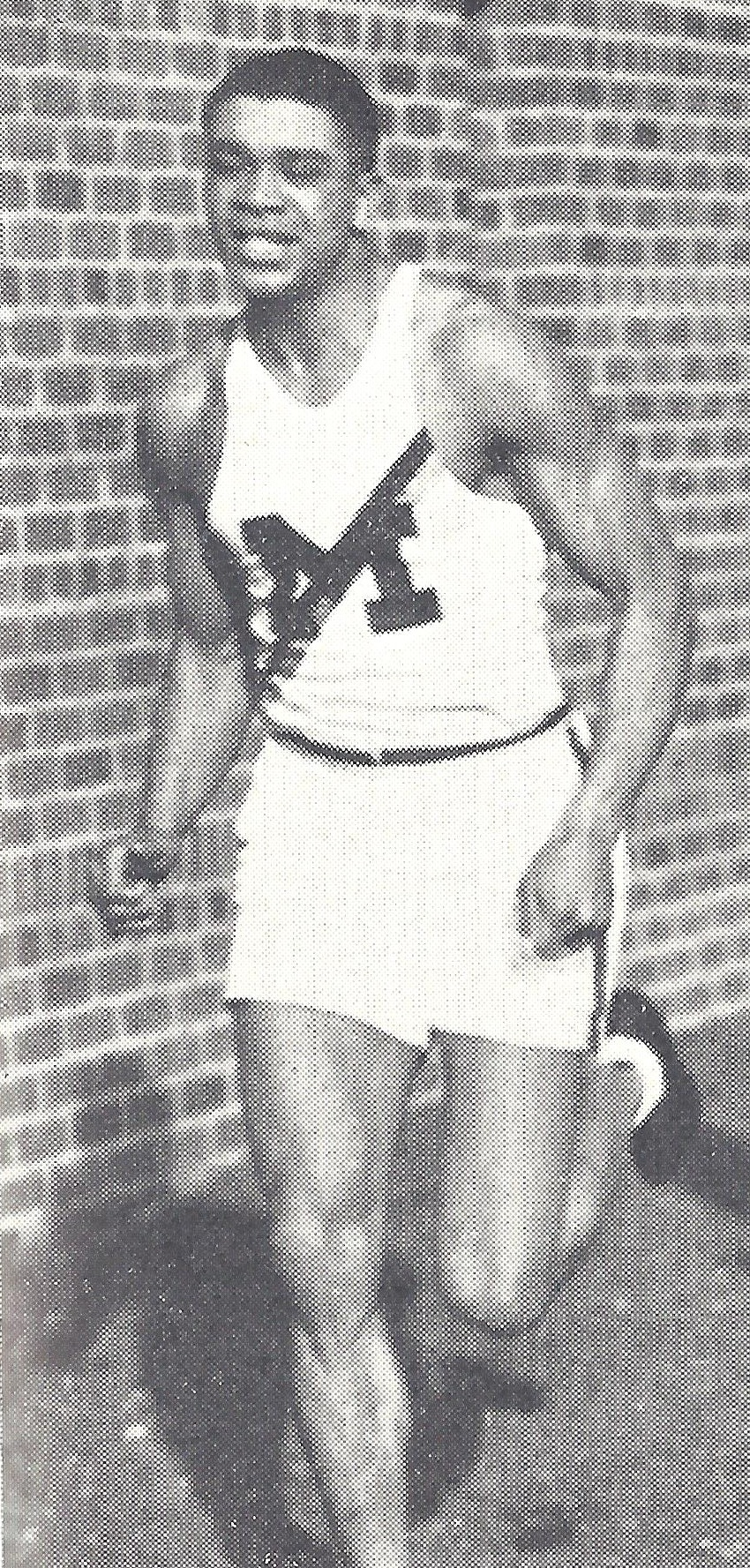
Ward from the 1934 Michiganensian

Ward attended the University of Michigan from 1931 to 1935, where he became one of the most successful track athletes in the school's history. As a freshman in 1932, Ward's specialty was the high jump. Ward won the NCAA high jump championship in June 1932 with a jump of 6–7 1/3. He jumped as high as 6-7-1/2 in his freshman year. Ward's best jump in 1932 was two inches above the mark that won the gold medal at the 1932 Summer Olympics (Canada's Duncan McNaughton won the gold with a jump of 6 feet, 5½ inches), but Ward did not qualify for the team.

Ward's accomplishments were not limited to the high jump. An Associated Press article in 1932 noted: "His specialty is the high jump for which he has a mark of 6 feet 7½ inches. He can run the high hurdles and the low hurdles. He has broad jumped 22 feet without training in that event. He put the 16-pound shot over 43 feet without prior experience, and it believed he might be developed into a world champion weight man. He unquestionably could be trained to do the springs. He is only 19. Ward has an ideal build for a track man, six feet, one inch tall, 185 pounds of well-distributed weight, good legs, natural co-ordination. He is quiet and unassuming, and popular with coaches and fellow members of the squad."

When Ward decided to try out for the football team as a sophomore, Michigan track fans worried that Ward would be injured. The Associated Press reported: "University of Michigan track fans do a lot of worrying these days because a Negro boy from Detroit insists on playing football. Willis Ward, they believe, will be the greatest track man ever to compete for the Maize and Blue—if he doesn't get hurt. … Ward is a good football player and loves the game. . . . Well wishers even have told him about the advantages of competing only in track and staying away from the gridiron, but he is determined to play on the eleven, and he is good enough to make the grade." Michigan's track coach, Chuck Hoyt, noted that "Ward is his own boss and football is his recreation."

=== First African-American football player in 40 years ===
In addition to the concerns of track fans, Ward's decision to try out for the football team raised issues of race. Though George Jewett had broken the race barrier as Michigan's first African-American football player in 1890, Michigan had not played another African-American in the 40 years after Jewett. During Fielding Yost's tenure as coach several African-American students joined the football team, but records indicate that none of them ever saw game action and only one earned even a "reserve letter". Some reports attribute the de facto segregation of the football team to racism on the part of Yost, who was the son of a Confederate soldier.

While in high school, Ward had decided to attend Dartmouth College. With head coach Harry Kipke's assurance that he would be given full opportunity to play football, Ward enrolled at Michigan. Kipke had played with African-American athletes in high school and was eager to have Ward on his team. According to John Behee, the author of a book on the history of African-American athletes at Michigan, Kipke "threatened to fight, physically fight, those alumni and fellow coaches who opposed his playing Ward." Behee wrote that "on several occasions Kipke took off his coat and was prepared to fight with those who bitterly opposed having a Negro play for Michigan."

Ward got the opportunity to prove himself in spring football practice in May 1932. According to one account, Kipke ordered his veterans to pound Ward "without mercy" during practice. "If, at the end of the week", said Kipke, "he doesn't turn in his uniform, then I know I've got a great player." The United Press reported on the results of spring practice: "Three young freshmen at the University of Michigan—Jerry Ford, of Grand Rapids; Russell Oliver, of Pontiac, and Willis Ward, Detroit Negro—displayed such brilliance during spring football practice that they are expected to become important cogs next fall in the Wolverine varsity eleven." Another report in July 1932 described Ward, the "giant negro," as being "the outstanding athlete becoming eligible for play."

Ward made the team in 1932 and started four games at end. Ivy Williamson, captain of the 1932 football team, greeted Ward at the field house and told him, "If you have any problems with anybody, let me know because we're prepared to take care of them." Reporting on his decision to play football and risk injury, the Associated Press noted: "Ward would rather win an 'M' on the gridiron than be an Olympic champion."

The 1932 Michigan Wolverines football team went 8–0, outscored its opponents 123–13, and won the national championship.

=== 1933 track season ===
During the 1933 track season, Ward was so dominant that he was dubbed Michigan's "one-man track team" and became a national sensation. He led Michigan to Big Ten championships in both indoor and outdoor track. Going into the Big Ten track meet in May 1933, Ward was expected to dominate. Coach Hoyt described Ward as "a good 'un," and praised him for his unassuming character and tolerance of the spotlight of publicity. One report noted: "He is altogether likeable, for he always speaks without raising his voice and never protests a decision. … Ward is a star now, but he is just finishing his first year of competition. Unless injuries hamper him it is likely he will be as great an attraction or possibly even greater than the two Negro track stars who preceded him here, DeHart Hubbard and Eddie Tolan."

Michigan won the Big Ten meet with 60½ points, with Ward individually accounting for 18 points. One writer noted that the Wolverines would have finished in second place "without the huge, versatile negro." At the meet, Ward won the 100-yard dash and the high jump and placed second in the 120 yard high hurdles and the broad jump. His performance at the Big Ten meet was described as "the greatest individual performance since Carl Johnson scored 20 points for Michigan in 1918."

Even TIME magazine took note of Ward's dominating performance. Time noted: "The other entrants in the Intercollegiates last week had reason to consider with awe another athlete who—until he helped Michigan win the Western Conference title last week, with 60½ points to Indiana's 47½ had not often been heard of outside the Midwest, except as a member of Michigan's football team. He was Willis Ward, 196-lb. Negro sophomore. At the Big Ten meet in Evanston last week. Willis Ward won the 100-yd. dash in 9.6 sec. He won the high jump, placed second in the broad jump. In the 120-yd. high hurdles, he forced Ohio State's Jack Keller to world's record time of 14.1 sec., finished a close second. The 18 points he won were what enabled Michigan to beat Indiana. They made his the most efficient individual performance in a Big Ten meet since Carl Johnson scored 20 points for Michigan in 1918. Quiet, unassuming, an above-average student of literature, Ward was the first Negro ever elected to Sphinx, Michigan's junior honor society."

At the Drake Relay Carnival in April 1933, he finished second in the 100-yard dash, narrowly losing to Ralph Metcalfe. The 1934 Michigan yearbook, the Michiganensian, noted: "Michigan climaxed a successful season by winning the Annual Butler Relays and taking the title from Indiana. Willis Ward won the meet almost single-handed when he scored thirteen of the team's 18¾ points. In winning the 60 yard dash, the Flashy negro star equaled the recognized world mark of 6.2 seconds." At the Big Ten indoor track championship, the Michiganensian noted that Ward, "Michigan's all around athlete, was easily the outstanding star of the meet." Ward won the 60-yard dash, the 70-yard high hurdles and the high jump.

=== 1933 football season ===
In 1933, Ward started all eight games for Michigan at right end and was a key player in Michigan's second consecutive undefeated football season and national championship. Time magazine credited the work of Ward and halfback Herman Everhardus: "Michigan came perilously close to slipping from the top of the Big Ten, where it has been for three years. That it did not slip was largely due to a crack halfback named Herman Everhardus and to Willis Ward, a rangy Negro end. It was Ward who, after hard-fighting Illinois had marched to a touchdown in the first period, shot through and blocked the place kick which would have given Illinois a seventh point." After the season was over, Coach Kipke also credited the play of Everhardus and his ends for the undefeated season: "Our ends, Ward and Petoskey, were near perfection." Michigan's left end, Ted Petoskey was named a first-team All-American in 1933, and Ward earned honorable mention All-American honors at right end.

=== Runner up for 1933 Big Ten athlete of the year ===
In December 1933, Ward finished second in close balloting for the Associated Press Big Ten Athlete of the Year award. The AP reported that Duane Purvis of Purdue beat Ward "by the slender margin of two votes." In the AP's polling of conference coaches and sports writers, 55 votes were cast, with Purvis receiving 17 votes to 15 for Ward, described by the AP as "Michigan's 'one-man track team.'" The AP pointed to Ward's dual contributions in football and track: "Ward, in addition to his feats in track, was one of the bright stars of Michigan's championship football team this fall. Fast and rangy, he was classed as one of the finest wingmen in football. In track, he has run the century in 9.6, high jumped 6 feet 7½ inches, leaped 24 feet in the broad jump and won his share of glory in the high hurdles."

=== 1934 track season ===
In 1934, Ward won the Big Ten long jump championship with a distance of 23–2¼.

=== 1934 football season ===
The 1934 football season proved to be one of the low points in the school's history, both because of the team's 1–7 record, and the ugly racial incident that kept Ward out of the game against Georgia Tech. Though excluded from the Georgia Tech game, Willis started every other game—five games at right end, and two games at halfback. Michigan scored only 21 points in the entire 1934 season, and Ward scored 12 of those points. In fact, Michigan scored nine points against Georgia Tech and Ward's 12 points were the only points scored by the Wolverines in the seven games in which Ward played. Michigan was shut out in the first two games, before beating Georgia Tech in the season's third game. The following week, Michigan lost to Illinois, 7–6, as Ward scored Michigan's only touchdown from the line of scrimmage of the entire 1934 season. (The season's only other touchdown came on a punt return against Georgia Tech.) Ward's touchdown came on a trick play, as fullback Johnny Regeczi passed the ball to end Mike Savage who lateraled to Ward. According to the Chicago Tribune, the lateral "enabled the fleet Negro to outfoot the Illinois secondary." After being shut out in three games after the Illinois match, Michigan closed the season with a 13–6 loss to Northwestern. Michigan's only points against Northwestern came on two field goals by Ward. Thus, all 12 of Michigan's 1934 points outside the Georgia Tech game were scored by Ward, without another Wolverine even having an extra point or a field goal.

=== 1934 Georgia Tech game ===
Despite his many accomplishments, the event for which Ward is most remembered is the game he did not play. In 1934, Michigan had scheduled Georgia Tech as the third game of the season. After learning that Michigan had an African-American player, Georgia Tech football coach and athletic director W. A. "Bill" Alexander refused to allow his team to take the field if Ward played. As early as the fall of 1933, Alexander wrote to Yost asking what was going to be done about Ward, asserting that his team would not take the field if Ward played.

As the game approached, word spread that Georgia Tech was insisting that Ward not play, and that the administration might capitulate to the demand. Ward's right to play became a major controversy on the campus. Mass meetings and demonstrations were held. Some students and faculty demanded that either Ward must play or the game should be canceled. Petitions were circulated, and formal protests were lodged with the university by the Ann Arbor Ministerial Association, the NAACP, the National Student League and many other groups. The student newspaper, The Michigan Daily, opined: "If the athletic department forgot it had Ward on its football team when it scheduled a game with Georgia Tech, it was astonishingly forgetful; ... if it was conscious of Ward's being on the team but scheduled the game anyway, it was extraordinarily stupid."

Time magazine ran a story about the uproar on Michigan's campus: "Fifteen hundred Michigan students and faculty members signed a petition asking that the team's star end, Negro Willis Ward, be allowed to play against Georgia Tech." According to Time, 200 "campus radicals" threatened to prevent the game from being played by standing in the middle of the field. Rumors of a sit-down protest on the 50-yard line during the game spread across campus in the week before the game. One alumnus recalled that, the night before the game, "bonfires lit all over the campus echoed with screams of student anger, and 'Kill Georgia Tech' was heard throughout Ann Arbor." In an attempt to thwart any attempt to disrupt the game, Yost hired a Pinkerton agent to infiltrate "The United Front Committee on Ward", a conglomerate of student organizations that supported Ward's right to play.

Athletic authorities argued that Ward should not play because it would be discourteous to Georgia Tech, and he might be injured. There was fear that if Ward played, he would be injured by malicious blows after the play had ended. Playwright Arthur Miller, then a writer for Michigan's student newspaper, learned first-hand about the strong resistance among the Georgia Tech team to playing on the same field with an African-American athlete. In his biography of Miller, Enoch Brater noted that Miller had friends from Arkansas who knew one of the Georgia Tech players. Brater described Miller's involvement this way: "Remmel [Miller's friend from Arkansas] took Miller with them to meet with members of the team, to protest but also to appeal to the athletes' sense of fair play. 'Miller was right in the middle of this', Remmel recalls. Not only did the visiting team rebuff 'the Yankee' Miller 'in salty language', but they told him they would actually kill Ward if he set one foot on the Michigan gridiron. 'The Georgia Tech team was wild.' Miller was furious. He 'went immediately to the office of the Michigan Daily and wrote an article about it, but it was not published.' . . . Remmel said that Miller 'could not believe that the Georgia Tech team would have tried to destroy Willis Ward—but, I am sure they would have.'"

In the end, Ward was not allowed to play. But in exchange, Georgia Tech agreed to reciprocate by benching their own star end, Hoot Gibson. As his teammates faced Georgia Tech, there are conflicting reports as to Ward's whereabouts. According to Time, Ward "sat calmly in a radio booth, watched his teammates defeat the Southerners, 9-to-2, earning what turned out to be their only win of the season." According to Behee, Ward was not even allowed to watch the game from the press box, or even from the bench of his own stadium. Instead, he spent the afternoon in a fraternity house. A third account states that Kipke "quietly sent Willis Ward off to scout another Michigan game in Wisconsin." The day after the Georgia Tech game was played, an editorial ran in The Michigan Daily stating "that everyone who touched (the Ward affair) did so only to lose in respect and esteem." In Georgia, some sports journalists and fans blamed the player exchange for the loss. Journalist Ralph McGill said "Willis Ward won the football game," arguing the loss of Gibson hurt Georgia Tech more than the loss of Ward hurt Michigan.

=== Gerald Ford's role in the Georgia Tech controversy ===
The school's refusal to play Ward in the Georgia Tech game later became part of the public legacy of President Gerald R. Ford. Ward recalled that he met "my man Jerry" during freshman orientation in 1932, and the two became friends and roommates when the football team traveled for road games. When Ford learned that the school had capitulated to Georgia Tech, some accounts indicate that he "quit the team" or threatened to quit in order "to make a statement and take a stand because Willis Ward was his friend." Ford wrote about the Georgia Tech incident in his autobiography, recalling that he felt the decision to keep Willis out of the game was "morally wrong." "I went to Willis himself. He urged me to play. 'Look,' he said, 'the team's having a bad year. We've lost two games already and we probably won't win any more. You've got to play Saturday. You owe it to the team.' I decided he was right. That Saturday afternoon, we hit like never before and beat Georgia Tech 9–2." Years later, Ford wrote that the Ward incident had influenced his thinking about race. Ford noted: "His sacrifice led me to question how educational administrators could capitulate to raw prejudice." Ford used the story to voice his support for U-M's affirmative action admissions policy saying, "Do we really want to risk turning back the clock to an era when the Willis Wards were isolated and penalized for the color of their skin, their economic standing or national ancestry?"

In 1976, Ward, then a probate court judge in Wayne County, said that Ford never mentioned the incident to him, but that Ford's brother later told him about it. "Jerry was very concerned," Ward recalled. "His brother told me, 'Jerry was so upset he wrote father asking him if he should quit the team. He was that angry.'" At Ford's funeral, President George W. Bush also spoke about the Willis Ward incident. Bush said: "Long before he was known in Washington, Gerald Ford showed his character and his leadership. As a star football player for the University of Michigan, he came face to face with racial prejudice when Georgia Tech came to Ann Arbor for a football game. One of Michigan's best players was an African American student named Willis Ward. Georgia Tech said they would not take the field if a black man were allowed to play. Gerald Ford was furious at Georgia Tech for making the demand, and for the University of Michigan for caving in. He agreed to play only after Willis Ward personally asked him to. The stand Gerald Ford took that day was never forgotten by his friend. And Gerald Ford never forgot that day either and three decades later, he proudly supported the Civil Rights Act and the Voting Rights Act in the United States Congress."

=== Impact of racism on Ward ===
Ward proved to be one of the most successful athletes in the history of the University of Michigan. He earned six varsity letters in football and track. In track, he won Big Ten titles in the 100-yard dash in 1933; in the high jump in 1933 and 1935; in the 400 meter dash in 1933; and in the long jump in 1934. On several occasions, Ward even beat Jesse Owens in the 100-yard dash. Because of his all-around skills, Ward was considered a likely contender for the U.S. decathlon team in the 1936 Olympics.

However, the Georgia Tech incident left Ward angry and disillusioned. He recalled that it sapped his competitive spirit. Ward considered quitting football, even writing a letter to Coach Kipke about his intentions of leaving the team. He recalled later that the refusal to let him play against Georgia Tech destroyed his will. "It was the fact that I couldn't play in the Georgia Tech game. That all of a sudden, the practice that you just did because it was the thing to do that was good—a tremendous amount of burnt up energy—all of a sudden becomes drudgery." His one sports highlight in 1935 was beating Jesse Owens at Yost Fieldhouse in the 60-yard dash and 65 high hurdles. Ward's times were neck-and-neck with Owens' up until the NCAA track and field championship. He took part in the Olympic trials in 1936, but having lost his competitive drive, Ward, in his own words, did not train to his peak and failed to make the U.S. team. "They were urging me to go out in '36," Ward recalled. "But that Georgia Tech game killed me. I frankly felt they would not let black athletes compete. Having gone through the Tech experience, it seemed an easy thing for them to say 'Well, we just won't run 'em if Hitler insists.'" Interviewed about the incident in 1976, Ward said: "It was like any bad experience—you can't forget it, but you don't talk about it. It hurts."

== Later life ==
Ward went on to earn a law degree from the Detroit College of Law in 1939, and was employed by the Ford Motor Company during and after his studies, serving as the employment director for colored workers at Ford's River Rouge plant.

=== Military service ===
In March 1941, Ward volunteered for induction into in the United States Army. Entering service in April, he was assigned to the 184th Field Artillery Regiment, a segregated unit stationed at Fort Custer, Michigan.

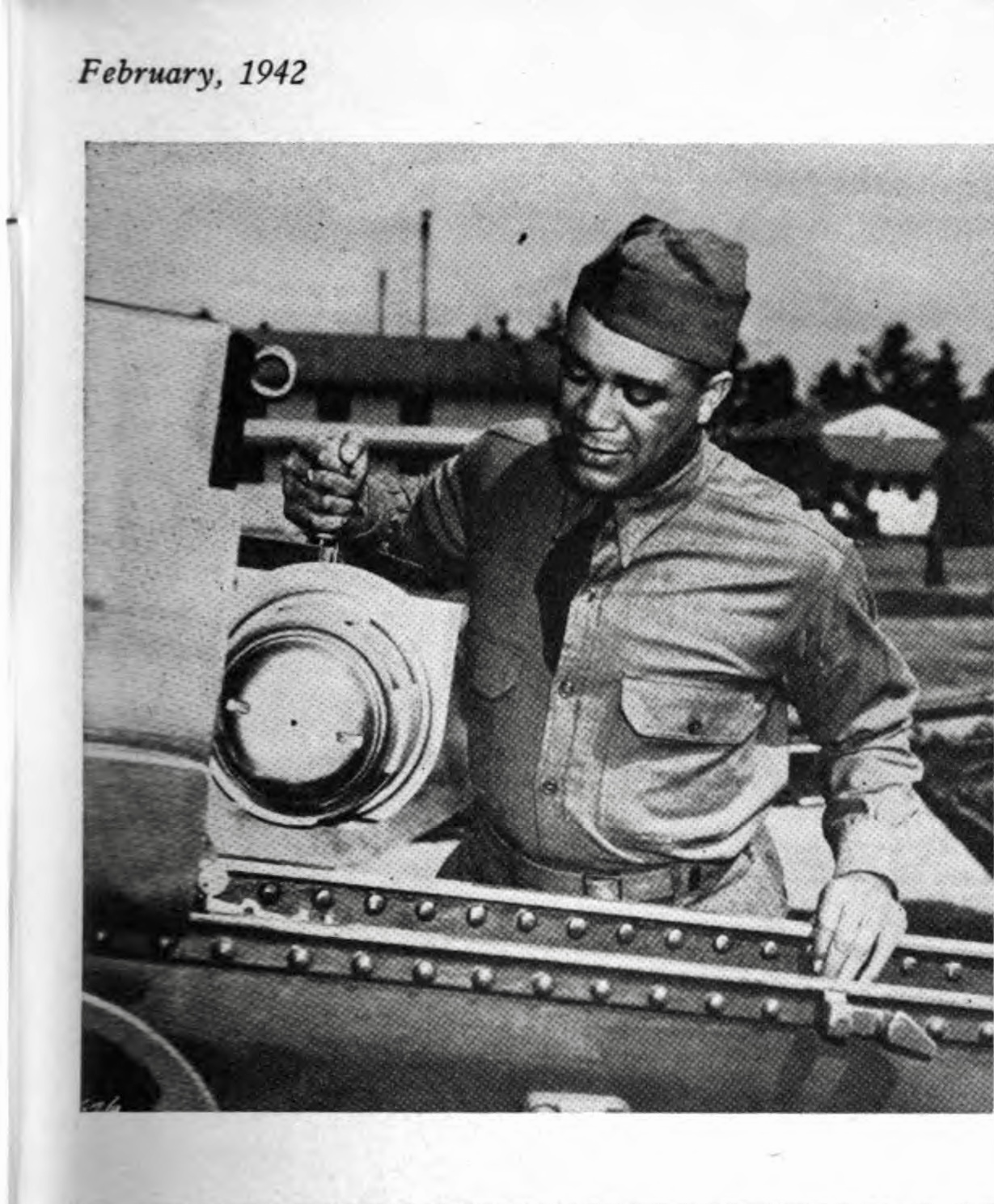
Willis Ward doing artillery training at Camp Custer, from February 1942 issue of The Crisis. Army Signal Corps photo

In December 1941, Ward was transferred to inactive duty as he was older than twenty-eight when he had volunteered, and he rejoined his employment at Ford. In 1942, he worked as a director for Ford's "ad hoc civil rights division, serving as the liaison between black and white workers" and an advocate for African American employees in the personnel department. He invited Owens to Detroit to replace him and remained with Ford until 1946. Ward was recalled to active service in February 1943. He was medically discharged in fall 1943.

=== Political career ===
In 1964, Ward spoke out against Barry Goldwater and in favor of Michigan Governor George Romney as a possible presidential candidate. In 1966, Romney appointed Willis to the Michigan Public Service Commission, the state agency responsible for regulating Michigan's public utilities; Willis became chairman of the PSC in 1969, serving in that capacity until 1973. Ward later was elected a probate judge in Wayne County, Michigan.

Ward was inducted into the University of Michigan Athletic Hall of Honor in 1981, as part of the fourth group inducted. He died of cancer, on December 30, 1983, at a hospital in Detroit.
