= Duane Purvis =

Purdue Boilermakers
- Positions: Halfback, fullback

Personal information
- Born: November 13, 1912; Mattoon, Illinois, U.S.
- Died: March 18, 1989 (aged 76)

Career information
- College: Purdue (1932–1934)

Awards and highlights
- Consensus All-American (1933); First-team All-American (1934); Third-team All-American (1932); 2× First-team All-Big Ten (1933, 1934); Second-team All-Big Ten (1932)

Duane Purvis (November 13, 1912 – March 18, 1989) was an American college football player and track and field athlete.

A native of Mattoon, Illinois, Purvis played halfback and fullback for the Purdue Boilermakers from 1932 to 1934. He was selected as an All-American in 1933 and 1934. Considered an all-around player, Purvis averaged five yards per carry in 1934 with touchdown runs of 80 and 73 yards. He was also considered to be an excellent defensive player and "without peer" as a long passer, using a strong right arm that also made him a world-class javelin thrower. He suffered a knee injury in the in East–West Shrine Bowl. During his hospitalization in California, the Oakland Tribune published a profile on Purvis describing him as a "brown-eyed, fair-haired, firm-jawed chap" who was considered "the finest back ever to pack a pigskin for the Boilermakers' eleven." Asked if he intended to play professional football, Purvis replied, "I should say not. I've had just about enough football. It's a great game when you're in college and the best game to forget about when you're out. I'm going to get to work as soon as they hand me that old A.B. at Purdue."

For more than 30 years, Purvis held the career rushing record at Purdue with 1,802 yards. His record was broken in November 1968 by both Leroy Keyes and Perry Williams.

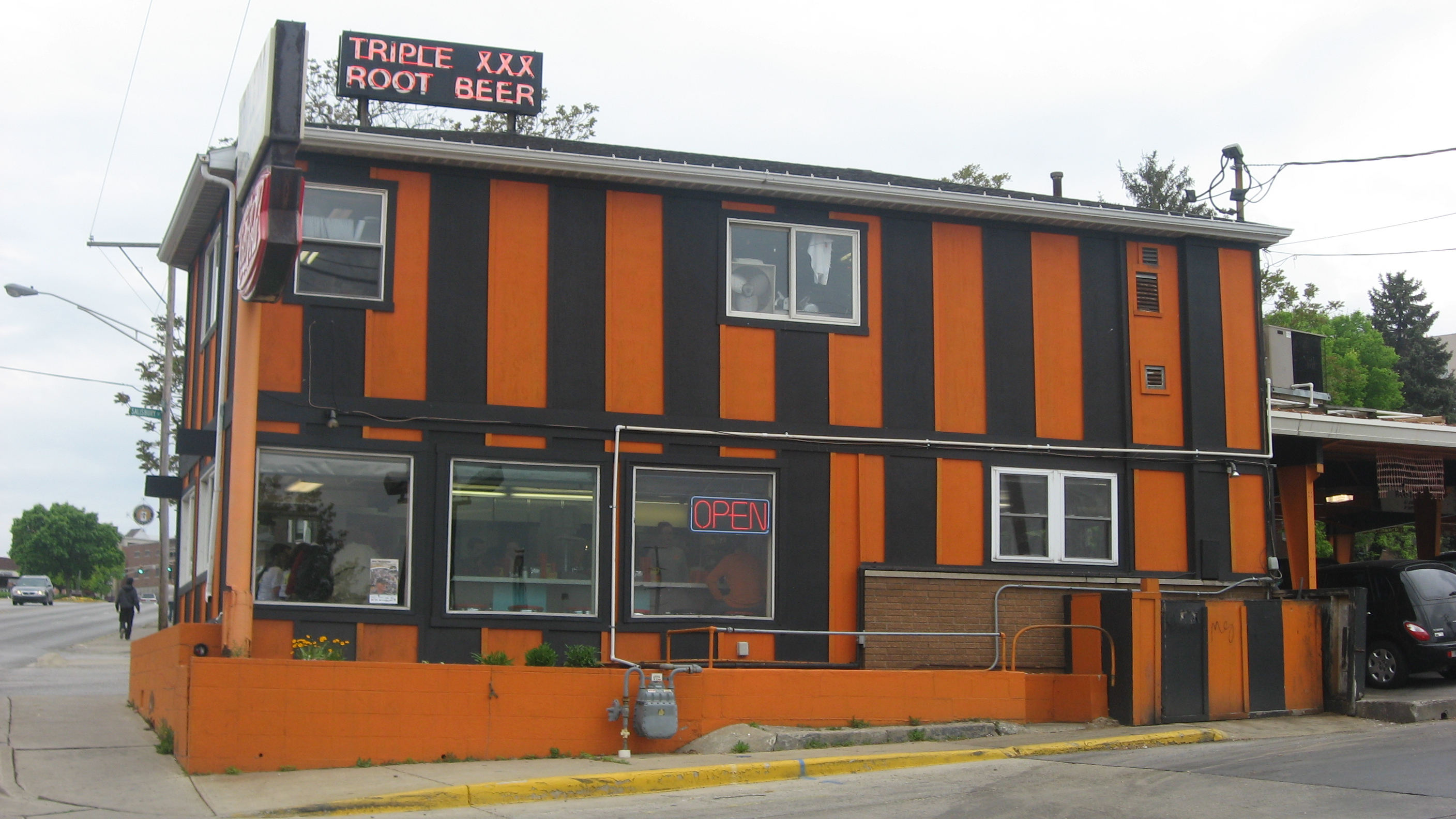
The Triple XXX Family Restaurant in West Lafayette, Indiana, home of the Duane Purvis burger.

In the sport of track and field, Purvis earned All-American recognition three times; winning the National Collegiate Athletic Association javelin championship in 1933 and 1934. Purvis was also ranked third globally in the javelin during 1933; that same year, in a poll conducted by the Associated Press, Duane Purvis was selected as the top athlete in the Big Ten Conference. As further testimony to the athletic prowess of Duane Purvis; his 1933 Purdue javelin record of 66.60 meters remained on the books until 1982, when it was eclipsed by Jim Hartman, with a mark of 69.88 meters.

Upon graduating from Purdue, Duane Purvis taught in the university's physical education department.; he was married to Dorothy Mae Evans (Sept. 1, 1911 – Jan. 25, 2007).

A sandwich named in Purvis's honor has been a favorite for many years at the Triple XXX diner near the Purdue campus. The all-beef burger is topped with the standard cheese, onions, lettuce, and pickle, but it stands out with a slathering of peanut butter on the bottom bun.
