= Frank Larson =

American gridiron football player and coach (1912–1983)

- 1935 Wheaties box featuring Larson

Profile
- Position: End

Personal information
- Born: May 30, 1912; Duluth, Minnesota, U.S.
- Died: September 1, 1983 (aged 71); International Falls, Minnesota, U.S.

Career information
- College: Minnesota

Career history
- 1933–1934: Minnesota

Awards and highlights
- Consensus All-American (1934); First-team All-American (1933); 2× First-team All-Big Ten (1933, 1934)

Frank "Butch" Larson (May 30, 1912 – September 1, 1983) was an American gridiron football player and coach. He was a consensus first-team All-American at the end position at the University of Minnesota in 1934. He later served as the head coach of the Winnipeg Blue Bombers from 1949 to 1950.

A native of Duluth, Minnesota, Larson graduated from Denfeld High School. He then enrolled at the University of Minnesota where he played on undefeated Minnesota Golden Gophers football teams in 1933 and 1934. The 1934 team was recognized as the national champion, and Larson was a consensus selection at the end position on the 1934 College Football All-America Team.

Larson received bachelor and master of arts degrees from Minnesota. From 1936 to 1941, he was a coach at Duluth Central High School. During World War II, he served in the Army Air Force and received nine battle stars. After the war, he coached the football team at Duluth Junior College. From 1949 to 1950, he was the head coach of the Winnipeg Blue Bombers of the Canadian Football League (CFL). He led the 1950 Blue Bombers to a 14–2 record. From 1952 to 1973, he coached the football team at International Falls High School.

Larson has been inducted into the University of Minnesota Athletic Hall of Fame (2006), the Minnesota High School Coaches Hall of Fame (1977), and the Duluth Sports Hall of Fame (1982). Larson died of cancer in 1983 at the age of 71 in International Falls, Minnesota.
