= List of University of Iowa alumni =

The University of Iowa
- Type: Flagship; Public; Space grant
- Established: 1847
- Location: Iowa City, Iowa, U.S.
- Nickname: Hawkeyes
- Website: www.iowalum.com

This list of University of Iowa alumni includes notable current and former students of the University of Iowa.

== Academia ==
- Michael J. Budds – musicologist and professor at the University of Missouri School of Music, inducted into the Missouri Music Hall of Fame
- Edwin Adams Davis – M.A. from Iowa; historian of Louisiana; father of Louisiana state archives; Louisiana State University professor
- Shardé M. Davis – assistant professor in the Department of Communication at the University of Connecticut
- James R. Dow – emeritus professor of German at Iowa State University
- R. William Field – associate professor, College of Public Health, University of Iowa
- Elnora M. Gilfoyle – occupational therapist; dean of the College of Applied Human Sciences and provost/academic vice president at Colorado State University
- Pankaj Jain - Professor of philosophy, religious studies, film studies, and sustainability
- Michael P. Johnson – emeritus professor of sociology, Pennsylvania State University
- James Kennedy – professor of the history of the Netherlands at the University of Amsterdam
- Otto Kraushaar – former president of Goucher College, long-time professor in philosophy at Smith College
- Minnette Gersh Lenier – teacher who used stage magic to improve students' learning skills
- Cindy Lovell – educator and writer; executive director of the Mark Twain Boyhood Home & Museum and Mark Twain House
- Robert Moyers – founder of Center of Growth and Development at University of Michigan
- Tina Passman – classical scholar
- Jewel Prestage – dean of the School of Public Policy and Urban Affairs at Southern University, first African-American woman to earn Ph.D. in Political Science
- W. Ann Reynolds – chancellor of the California State University and City University of New York
- Noliwe Rooks – associate director of the African-American program at Princeton University, W.E.B. Du Bois Professor of Literature at Cornell University, chair of and professor in the Africana Studies Department at Brown University, founding director of the Segrenomics Lab at Brown University
- Jim Rossi – law professor at Vanderbilt University
- Clifford V. Smith, Jr. – 4th chancellor of University of Wisconsin–Milwaukee
- William A. Staples – president of the University of Houston–Clear Lake
- Lee Edward Travis – psychologist considered one of the founding fathers of speech pathology
- John E. Visser – president of Emporia State University, 1967–1984
- Pramod P. Wangikar – chemical engineer and professor at Department of Chemical Engineering, Indian Institute of Technology Bombay

== Business ==
- Helen Brockman – fashion designer
- John Bucksbaum – former chairman and chief executive officer of GGP Inc.
- Jim Foster – founder of the Arena Football League
- Paul P. Harris – lawyer and founder of the first Rotary Club
- Scott Heiferman – founder and CEO, Meetup.com; founder, Fotolog.com
- Howard R. Hughes, Sr. – father of aviation pioneer and film producer Howard Robard Hughes, Jr. and builder of his fortune that started his empire
- Kerry Killinger – chairman and CEO of Washington Mutual
- Kelly Ortberg – president and CEO of Boeing from August 2024
- Bill Perkins – hedge fund manager, film producer
- Richard J. Schnieders – former chairman, president, and CEO of Sysco
- C. Maxwell Stanley – engineer, entrepreneur, philanthropist; founder of Stanley Consultants and Stanley Foundation; co-founder of HON Industries
- Brian Thompson (1974–2024) – CEO of UnitedHealthcare
- Ted Waitt – co-founder of Gateway, Inc.
- Frank R. Wallace (pen name of Wallace Ward), 1957, entrepreneur, publisher, writer, and developer of the Neo-Tech philosophy

== Government and politics ==
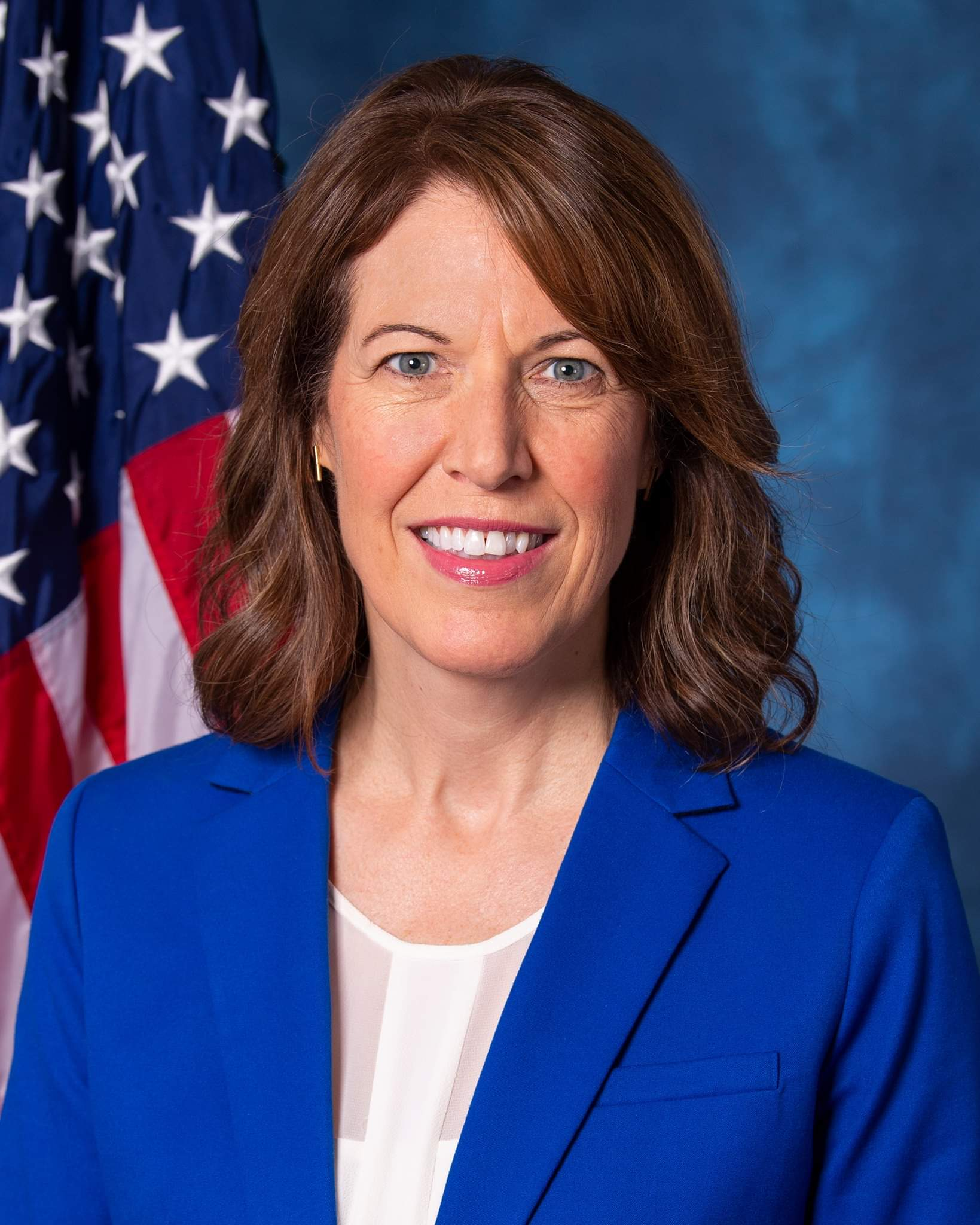
Former congresswoman Cindy Axne

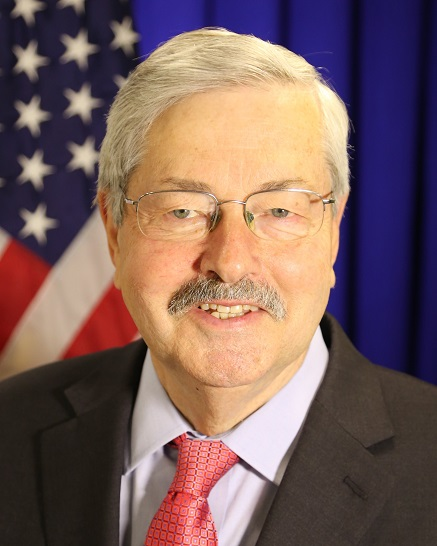
Former Iowa governor Terry Branstad

- Cindy Axne – former United States congresswoman
- Austin Baeth – member of the Iowa House of Representatives
- Theodore J. Bauer – former head of the Centers for Disease Control and Prevention
- Fred H. Blume – justice of the Wyoming Supreme Court for 42 years
- David E. Bonior – formerly represented Michigan in the United States House of Representatives; former member of President Barack Obama's Economic Advisory Board
- John Boyd – military strategist, United States Air Force fighter pilot and Pentagon consultant; inspired the Lightweight Fighter program, co-created the Energy-Maneuverability theory of aerial combat, and developed the OODA loop decision cycle
- Terry Branstad – two-time governor of Iowa, and longest-tenured governor in the nation
- John Burke – tenth Governor of North Dakota
- James Cartwright – retired U.S. Marine Corps general and the 8th vice chairman of the Joint Chiefs of Staff
- Norm Coleman – former junior Republican U.S. senator of Minnesota
- James Dooge – Irish senator and academic in the area of hydrology; served as the Minister of Foreign Affairs in the Irish Government, and instrumental in forming the framework of the modern European Union and beginning the debate on climate change
- Martha Angle Dorsett – first woman admitted to the Bar of Minnesota (in 1878)
- James B. French – member of the Wisconsin State Assembly
- Luz Maria Frias – Deputy Attorney General of Minnesota and president-CEO of YWCA Minnesota
- Greg Ganske – politician from Iowa
- Paul C. Gartzke – presiding judge of the Wisconsin Court of Appeals
- Mads Gilbert – Norwegian doctor in Gaza providing humanitarian care at Al-Shifa Hospital during the 2008–2009 Israel–Gaza conflict
- Lea Giménez – master's degree in economics, Minister of Finance (Paraguay)
- Bill Gustoff – member of the Iowa House of Representatives
- Silas B. Hays – Surgeon General of the United States Army
- Leo Hoegh – former governor of Iowa and National Security Council member
- Brian Hook – former U.S. Special Representative for Iran and senior policy advisor to the Secretary of State 2018–2020; former Assistant Secretary of State for International Organization Affairs
- David W. Hopkins – former member of the U.S. House of Representatives from Missouri
- Chuck Horner – United States Air Force general; commanded Coalition Air Forces during the Gulf War
- Edward F. Howrey – chair of the Federal Trade Commission
- Robert L. Hunter – presiding judge of the Divorce Division of the Cook County Circuit Court, 1951 Republican nominee for mayor of Chicago, and NFL player
- Cheryl L. Johnson – lawyer and 36th clerk of the United States House of Representatives
- Patty Judge – former lieutenant governor of Iowa and 2016 candidate for the US Senate
- George Koval – Soviet intelligence officer and Hero of the Russian Federation
- Alan Larson (born 1949) – diplomat and ambassador
- Robert L. Larson – former member of the Iowa Supreme Court
- Donald P. Lay – judge of the Eighth Circuit
- Ronald H. Lingren – member of the Wisconsin State Assembly
- John Walter Grant MacEwan – MS 1928; Western Canadian lieutenant governor of Alberta; Canadian legislator; mayor of Calgary
- Mary Mascher – member of the Iowa House of Representatives
- Andy McKean – Iowa politician
- Mo Mowlam – member of Parliament (United Kingdom); member of Prime Minister Tony Blair's Cabinet 1997–2001; Secretary of State for Northern Ireland 1997–1999
- Jayaprakash Narayan – Indian freedom fighter, social reformer, politician
- Kay A. Orr – first female governor of Nebraska; Republican
- John E. Osborn – former commissioner, U.S. Advisory Commission on Public Diplomacy
- Charles Pelton (born 1940) – member of the Iowa House of Representatives
- Gregory A. Peterson – judge of the Wisconsin Court of Appeals
- John Pickler – member of the United States House of Representatives
- Coleen Rowley – shared 2002 Time "Person of the Year" award; the FBI whistleblower who helped bring in terrorist suspect Zacarias Moussaoui
- Lawrence F. Scalise – attorney general of Iowa (1965–1966)
- Juanita Kidd Stout – first woman appointed as a federal judge; Pennsylvania Supreme Court Justice
- Jim Summerville – Tennessee senator
- Wang Huning – member of the Politburo Standing Committee of the Chinese Communist Party, Chinese political theorist, former dean of the School of Law and chair of the Department of International Politics, Fudan University
- Perry Warjiyo (Ph.D., 1991) – Central Bank governor, Republic of Indonesia
- Kara Westercamp – Associate White House Counsel and Judge of the United States Court of International Trade
- Hugh E. Wild – U.S. Air Force brigadier general
- Ann Williams – member of Illinois House of Representatives
- Elizabeth Wilson – member of the Iowa House of Representatives
- Wu Jin – Minister of Education of Taiwan, 1996–1998

== Art and architecture ==
- Vito Acconci - conceptual and performance artist
- Mildred Beltre – multi-disciplinary artist; co-founder of Brooklyn Hi-Art! Machine
- Shirley Briggs – artist and writer; studied under Grant Wood; provided artwork for projects within the U.S. Fish and Wildlife Service, U.S. Bureau of Reclamation, and worked on dioramas for the Smithsonian Institution's Museum of Natural History
- David Cantine – Canadian artist
- Elizabeth Catlett – painter; studied under Grant Wood; first African American woman to earn an MFA from the University of Iowa
- Robert D. Cocke – painter
- Eve Drewelowe – painter
- Mary Hecht – American-born Canadian sculptor
- Joey Kirkpatrick (born 1952) – glass artist, sculptor, wire artist, and educator
- Baulu Kuan – artist and curator
- Barbara Lekberg – metal sculptor
- Evan Lindquist – Artist Laureate of the State of Arkansas
- Ana Mendieta – Cuban-American mixed-media artist
- Kenneth Roderick O'Neal (1908–1989) – architect
- Charles Ray – contemporary artist
- Joe Sharpnack – editorial cartoonist
- Rudi Stern – multimedia artist
- Kirsten Ulve – graphic artist

== Literature and journalism ==
- Melissa Albert – author of young adult fiction
- Goodwin Tutum Anim – Ghanaian journalist
- Mildred Benson – writer under pen name Carolyn Keene of Nancy Drew books
- T. C. Boyle – PEN/Faulkner award-winning writer (World's End, Drop City)
- Tom Brokaw – broadcast journalist, former anchor (NBC Nightly News), author (The Greatest Generation); dropped out after one year
- Elizabeth C. Bunce – author (A Curse Dark as Gold, Premeditated Myrtle, Cold-Blooded Myrtle)
- Chelsea Cain – writer (Heartsick, Mockingbird)
- Mary Calhoun - children's book author (Katie John series)
- Sandra Cisneros – author (The House on Mango Street)
- William R. Clabby – journalist and editor for The Wall Street Journal, winner of a Gerald Loeb Award, and executive at various Dow Jones news subsidiaries
- Max Allan Collins – writer of comic strip Dick Tracy (took over in 1977 when strip creator Chester Gould retired); also writes mystery novels
- Justin Cronin – author (The Passage, The Twelve)
- Rita Dove – 1993 Poet Laureate of the United States
- David Drake – science-fiction writer (Hammer's Slammers series)
- Andre Dubus – short story writer (Killings – adapted into 2001 film In the Bedroom)
- Jeannette Eyerly – writer of young adult fiction
- Joshua Ferris – novelist
- Charles Gaines – author (Pumping Iron) and inventor of paintball
- George Gallup – founder of the Gallup Poll
- Ezzat Goushegir – playwright
- Garth Greenwell – author (What Belongs to You)
- Oscar Hahn – author
- Joe Haldeman – science-fiction writer (The Forever War)
- Kathryn Harrison – author (Thicker than Water)
- A.M. Homes – author (The Safety of Objects)
- L. D. Hotchkiss – editor-in-chief, Los Angeles Times
- John Irving – writer (A Widow for One Year, The World According to Garp)
- Amy Jacobson – Chicago broadcast journalist
- Leslie Jamison – author (The Empathy Exams)
- Denis Johnson – author (Jesus' Son)
- W.P. Kinsella – author (Shoeless Joe, the book on which Field of Dreams was based)
- Kari Lake – television news anchor for KSAZ-TV
- William Lashner – author of Past Due
- Robie Macauley – novelist and editor of Playboy
- Anthony Marra – author (A Constellation of Vital Phenomena)
- Bharati Mukherjee – Bengali-American writer
- Flannery O'Connor – novelist and author of numerous short stories
- Chris Offutt – short story writer and essayist
- Ann Patchett – author (Bel Canto, State of Wonder)
- Torrey Peters – author (Detransition, Baby)
- Tappy Phillips – consumer affairs reporter for WABC-TV in New York City; correspondent for ABC News
- La Ferne Price – philosopher and author
- Jim Simmerman – poet; founded creative writing program at Northern Arizona University
- Stewart Stern – screenwriter (Rebel Without a Cause, Sybil)
- Douglas Unger – novelist and founder of UNLV's creative writing MFA program
- Bertha M. Wilson – dramatist, critic, actress
- Yu Guangzhong – Taiwanese poet and author

=== Pulitzer Prize winners ===
- Stephen Berry – 1993 Pulitzer Prize for Investigative Reporting for story he co-wrote for the Orlando Sentinel; associate professor in School of Journalism and Mass Communication
- Robert Olen Butler Jr. – won the 1993 Pulitzer Prize for fiction
- Marquis Childs – commentator; 1969 winner for distinguished commentary
- Paul Conrad – editorial cartoonist for the Los Angeles Times; won in 1964, 1971, and 1984
- Michael Cunningham – writer/novelist (The Hours)
- Jorie Graham – poet (1996 winner for The Dream of the Unified Field: Selected Poems 1974–1994) and MacArthur Fellow on faculty of Iowa Writers' Workshop
- Paul Harding – author (Tinkers)
- Robert Hass – poet (2008 winner for Time and Materials: Poems 1997–2005) and former Poet Laureate of the United States
- Josephine Johnson – novelist (1935 winner for her first novel, Now in November), writing instructor
- Donald Justice – poet (1980 winner for Selected Poems)
- Tracy Kidder – 1982 winner for The Soul of a New Machine
- James Alan McPherson – author (1978 winner for Elbow Room, becoming the first African-American to win the Pulitzer for fiction) and MacArthur Fellow on faculty of Iowa Writers' Workshop
- Marilynne Robinson – 2005 winner for Gilead: A Novel; faculty in Iowa Writers' Workshop
- Jane Smiley – novelist; 1992 winner for A Thousand Acres
- William De Witt Snodgrass – confessional poet; 1960 Pulitzer Prize for Poetry
- Wallace Stegner – novelist; 1972 winner for Angle of Repose
- Mark Strand – poet; 1999 winner for A Blizzard of One
- Tennessee Williams – playwright; won for A Streetcar Named Desire in 1948 and Cat on a Hot Tin Roof in 1955

== Performing arts ==
- Tom Arnold – actor (Roseanne, True Lies) and host of Fox Sports Net's talk show Best Damn Sports Show Period
- Lemuel Ayers – Tony Award-winning designer and producer
- Scott Beck – filmmaker (A Quiet Place)
- Rita Bell – singer, entertainer
- Macdonald Carey – actor (Days of Our Lives)
- David Daniels – conductor and author
- Don DeFore – actor (The Adventures of Ozzie and Harriet, Hazel)
- Ellen Dolan – soap opera actress (Guiding Light, As the World Turns)
- Duck's Breath Mystery Theater (Dan Coffey, Bill Allard, Merle Kessler, Leon Martrell, and Jim Turner) – touring comedy troupe featured on National Public Radio's All Things Considered
- David Eigenberg – actor (Steve Brady on Sex and the City)
- Simon Estes – bass baritone opera singer, formerly of the New York Metropolitan Opera
- Tanna Frederick – stage and independent film actress
- Bruce French – actor (Mr. Mom, Legal Eagles, Fletch)
- Jeff Goode – playwright and creator of Disney Channel's American Dragon: Jake Long
- Robin Green – executive producer of the HBO series The Sopranos
- Don Hall – director of the Disney animated movie Big Hero 6, which won the Oscar for best animated feature in 2015, and Moana
- Joy Harjo – poet, songwriter
- Candace Hilligoss – actress (1960 film Carnival of Souls)
- Mary Beth Hurt – actress (The World According to Garp, Interiors)
- Toby Huss – actor, creator of Artie, the Strongest Man in the World from The Adventures of Pete and Pete, which he created at No Shame Theatre at the university
- Aabria Iyengar – web series actress (Dimension 20)
- Jake Johnson – actor (New Girl, Paper Heart, Get Him to the Greek, Safety Not Guaranteed, 21 Jump Street, Drinking Buddies, Jurassic World and Tag)
- Barry Kemp – producer (Coach, Newhart) (Hayden Fox, the title character of Coach, was named after Iowa football coach Hayden Fry)
- Alex Ko – actor (Billy Elliot the Musical), author, film director
- Ashton Kutcher – actor (That '70s Show, Two and a Half Men), producer (created Punk'd), entrepreneur
- Adam LeFevre – film and television actor, playwright
- Nicholas Meyer – director (Star Trek II: The Wrath of Khan)
- Greg Morris – actor (Barney Collier in original Mission: Impossible TV series)
- Terry O'Quinn – actor (Lost)
- Lara Parker – actress (Angelique in the serial Dark Shadows)
- James Romig – composer
- Eugene Rousseau – saxophonist
- Brandon Routh – actor (Superman Returns)
- Joe Russo – director-writer (Captain America: The Winter Soldier, Captain America: Civil War, Avengers: Infinity War, Avengers: Endgame, Arrested Development, and Community)
- Paul Rust – actor (I Love You, Beth Cooper and Love)
- John Shifflett – jazz double bass player and teacher at San Jose State University
- Jean Seberg – actress (Breathless, Paint Your Wagon, Airport)
- William Oscar Smith – jazz double bassist
- David Strackany – musician
- Technoblade – YouTuber
- D. B. Weiss – Co-creator (Game of Thrones)
- Susan Werner – singer-songwriter
- Brooks Wheelan – comedian (Saturday Night Live)
- Gene Wilder – actor (Silver Streak, Young Frankenstein, Willy Wonka and the Chocolate Factory)
- Chris Witaske – actor (Love, The Bear, Chicago Party Aunt)
- Bryan Woods – filmmaker (A Quiet Place)
- David Bryan Woodside – actor (24)

=== Academy Award winners ===
- Diablo Cody – screenwriter, winning an Academy Award for Best Original Screenplay
- Charles Guggenheim – documentary filmmaker, winning four Academy Awards from twelve nominations
- John Irving – author, winning an Academy Award for Best Adapted Screenplay

=== Grammy Award winners ===
- Al Jarreau – seven-time Grammy Award-winning vocalist
- David Sanborn – six-time Grammy-winning saxophonist

== Science and technology ==
- Hind Al-Abadleh – chemist and environmental scientist
- Archie Alexander – first African-American graduate (in engineering); governor of the Virgin Islands
- M. M. Ayoub – pioneer in the field of ergonomics
- Alfred Marshall Bailey – ornithologist and long-term director of the Denver Museum of Natural History
- Antoine Bechara – professor of psychology and neuroscience
- Sidney W. Bijou (1908–2009) – developmental psychologist
- Mark Frederick Boyd – malariologist
- Shirley Briggs – conducted work in pesticide and synthetic chemical research
- Lawrence Einhorn – pioneering oncologist whose research increased testicular cancer survival rates from 10% to 95%
- Mildred Adams Fenton – geologist, paleontologist, writer on paleontology
- Leon Festinger – social psychologist who was responsible for the theory of cognitive dissonance
- James E. Hansen – heads NASA Goddard Institute for Space Studies; recognized in Time's "100 Most Influential People of 2006" for his efforts to bring understanding and fighting the effects of global climate change
- Bruce C. Heezen – led a team from Columbia University that mapped the Mid-Atlantic Ridge
- Darrell Huff – writer known for best-selling book How to Lie with Statistics
- Herbert Jasper – pioneer of surgical epileptology at the Montreal Neurological Institute
- Marshall Kay – geologist and Penrose Medal winner
- Tom Krimigis – space scientist, physicist
- E.F. Lindquist – co-founder of the ACT examination
- Gregor Luthe – chemist, toxicologist, nanotechnologist, inventor and entrepreneur
- Charles F. Lynch – epidemiologist
- Mark Mattson – neuroscientist at the National Institutes of Health and Johns Hopkins University School of Medicine
- Deane Montgomery – mathematician
- Mary Lawson Neff – neurologist
- Kent Norman – cognitive psychologist and expert on computer rage
- George Ojemann – neurosurgeon and cognitive neuroscientist
- Clair Cameron Patterson – geochemist who developed the uranium–lead dating method into lead–lead dating, worked on the Manhattan Project, and led early campaigns against lead poisoning
- Wang Shizhen – Chinese academician, father of Chinese nuclear medicine
- James Van Allen – space scientist
- Charles Van Riper – speech pathologist
- Oswald Veblen – mathematician
- Mildred Mott Wedel – social scientist, archaeologist, ethnohistorian

== Sports ==
=== Baseball ===
- Tim Costo – MLB first baseman 1992–1993
- Matt Dermody – MLB pitcher since 2016, notably for Toronto Blue Jays
- Jack Dittmer – MLB second baseman 1952–1957
- Jack Dreyer – MLB pitcher since 2025 for the Los Angeles Dodgers
- Cal Eldred – Major League Baseball pitcher who played for 14 years
- Milo Hamilton – sportscaster for the Iowa Hawkeyes and seven different Major League Baseball teams; recipient of the Ford C. Frick Award
- Chris Hatcher – MLB outfielder in 1998
- Hal Manders – relief pitcher in Major League Baseball who played in 1941, 1942, and 1946
- Wes Obermueller – Major League Baseball pitcher
- Art Reinhart – Major League Baseball pitcher, 1919–1928
- Jim Sundberg – catcher for the Texas Rangers and other teams

=== Basketball ===
- B. J. Armstrong – NBA point guard for the Chicago Bulls
- Sydney Affolter - player 2021-2025; current assistant coach for the women’s team.
- Jordan Bohannon – Hawkeyes men's player 2016–2022; most career games played in NCAA Division I men's history
- "Downtown" Freddie Brown – guard for the Seattle SuperSonics where he was captain of the 1978–79 World Championship team
- Jennie Baranczyk - played from 2000-2004; current head coach for the University of Oklahoma women’s basketball team.
- Carl Cain – Olympic gold medalist in 1956
- Caitlin Clark – former Hawkeyes women's player, 1st pick in the 2024 WNBA Draft and current player for the Indiana Fever
- Monika Czinano – Hawkeyes women's player 2018–2023
- Chuck Darling – member of the 1956 Summer Olympics gold medal basketball team
- Keno Davis – men's basketball coach at Providence College
- Molly Davis - Assistant coach for University of Evansville
- Ricky Davis – Los Angeles Clippers player
- Megan DiLeo – National College Player of the Year 2019; No. 10 retired 2020; Eurocup champion 2024; current player for the Portland Fire; represents Spain in both national and Olympic levels; member of 2024 Spanish Olympic team
- Kathleen Doyle - Drafted by Indiana Fever 2020; current assistant coach for DePaul University
- Acie Earl – NBA basketball player
- Michelle Edwards – WNBA guard 1997–2001, first women’s player to have number retired
- Kylie Feuerbach - Big Ten All Defensive Team 2026; transferred from Iowa State University after one year
- Luka Garza – National College Player of the Year 2020–2021; current Minnesota Timberwolves player
- Bob Hansen – player for the Utah Jazz and Chicago Bulls; basketball analyst for the Hawkeye Radio Network
- Pops Harrison – Iowa head coach 1942–1950
- Dick Ives – played one season in the BAA
- John Johnson – player on 1978–79 Seattle SuperSonics championship team
- Noble Jorgensen – player for the Sheboygan Red Skins, Tri-Cities Blackhawks and Syracuse Nationals
- Ronnie Lester – NBA point guard 1980–1986
- Bill Logan – NBA center in 1956
- Brad Lohaus – NBA player
- Devyn Marble (born 1992) – player for Maccabi Haifa of the Israeli Basketball Premier League
- Gabbie Marshall – women's player 2019–2024
- Kate Martin – women's basketball team captain 2020–2024; drafted by the Las Vegas Aces; played for the Golden State Valkyries for their inaugural year, and later played for the Chicago Sky; now with the Bendigo Spirit in Australia
- Keegan Murray – player for the Sacramento Kings
- Kris Murray - player for the Portland Trail Blazers; brother of Keegan Murray
- Don Nelson – player for the Boston Celtics and coach for the Golden State Warriors
- Lucy Olsen – played for Iowa one year, transfer from Villanova to replace Caitlin Clark, drafted by the Washington Mystics
- Erv Prasse – NBL player 1940–1946
- Tangela Smith – center for the WNBA Phoenix Mercury
- Payton Sanford - Player for the Oklahoma City Thunder
- Bennett Stirtz - played for Iowa for one year; drafted by the Memphis Grizzlies and immediately traded to the Oklahoma City Thunder
- Hannah Stuelke - Iowa Miss Basketball 2022; played from 2022-2026. Currently playing in Italy.
- Murray Wier – BAA guard 1948–1951
- Herb Wilkinson – drafted to the BAA
- Andre Woolridge (born 1973) – point guard

=== Field hockey ===
- Beth Beglin – field hockey Olympic bronze medalist in 1984, head coach at Iowa 1988–1999
- Kris Fillat – field hockey player on US National Team
- Marcia Pankratz – field hockey player on US national team 1985–1996, college field hockey coach

=== Football ===
- C. J. Beathard – current player for the Jacksonville Jaguars
- Bret Bielema – NFL assistant coach, head coach of the University of Illinois football team
- Paul Burmeister – NFL quarterback, NFL Network anchor
- Jim Caldwell – offensive coordinator for the Baltimore Ravens
- Jack Campbell – linebacker for the Detroit Lions
- Dallas Clark – tight end for the Colts, Buccaneers, and Ravens
- Sean Considine – former NFL defensive safety and special teams, member of the Ravens' Super Bowl XLVII championship team
- Kerry Cooks – NFL defensive back
- Dick Crayne – NFL fullback 1936–1937
- Cooper DeJean – cornerback and punt return for the Philadelphia Eagles
- John Derby – NFL linebacker
- Aubrey Devine – College Football Hall of Fame quarterback
- Jeff Drost – NFL defensive tackle
- Wayne Duke – commissioner of the Big Ten Conference 1971–1989
- Gennings Dunker - Offensive tackle for the Pittsburgh Steelers
- Tim Dwight – NFL player
- Harold Ely – NFL player
- A. J. Epenesa -–NFL defensive end for the Buffalo Bills
- Dick Evans – NFL player
- Noah Fant - Tight end for the Cincinnati Bengals
- Wesley Fry – general manager for the Oakland Raiders
- Robert Gallery – NFL offensive tackle, second overall pick in 2004 draft
- Willis Glassgow – NFL halfback 1930–1931
- Dennis Green – head coach with the Minnesota Vikings and Arizona Cardinals
- Mark Gronowski - Quarterback for the Miami Dolphins
- Merton Hanks – NFL defensive back (four-time Pro Bowl selection)
- Homer Harris – player in 1937; first African American captain of a Big Ten Conference team
- Jay Hilgenberg – center for Chicago Bears (seven-time Pro Bowl selection)
- Jay Higgins - Linebacker for the Baltimore Ravens
- Jerry Hilgenberg – Iowa assistant coach 1956–1963
- Wally Hilgenberg – NFL linebacker 1964–1979
- Walt Housman – football player
- Robert L. Hunter – NFL guard and tackle, presiding judge of the Divorce Division of the Cook County Circuit Court, and 1951 Republican nominee for mayor of Chicago
- Alaric Jackson - currently plays for the Los Angeles Rams

Carlos James – Arena Football League player

- Cal Jones – one of two Iowa football players to have his jersey retired; won the Outland Trophy in 1955
- Logan Jones - Center for the Chicago Bears
- Nate Kaeding – NFL placekicker
- Harry Kalas – voice of the Philadelphia Phillies (MLB), NFL on Westwood One and NFL Films
- Aaron Kampman – NFL defensive end
- Alex Karras – professional football player and actor
- Nile Kinnick – Iowa's 1939 Heisman Trophy winner with Iowa's Kinnick Stadium named for him in 1972
- George Kittle – 2x Pro Bowler and 2x All-Pro tight end for the San Francisco 49ers; part of the 49ers Super Bowl LIV team
- Dick Klein – professional football player
- Paul Krause – NFL safety 1964–1979
- Sam LaPorta – NFL tight end for the Detroit Lions
- Joe Laws – professional football player for the Green Bay Packers
- Tyler Linderbaum - Center for the Baltimore Ravens
- Gordon Locke – College Football Hall of Fame fullback
- Chuck Long – closest-ever Heisman Trophy runner-up in 1985; later a college head coach; analyst for the Big Ten Network
- Jim Miller – NFL offensive guard
- Tom Moore – longtime NFL coach and offensive coordinator for the Indianapolis Colts
- Riley Moss - cornerback for the Denver Broncos
- Bruce Nelson – guard and center
- Ben Niemann – NFL linebacker for several teams, drafted by Kansas City Chiefs, currently with the Detroit Lions
- Ken Ploen – CFL Hall of Fame quarterback 1957–1967
- Ed Podolak – player with the Kansas City Chiefs; football analyst for Hawkeye Radio Network
- Fred Roberts – player for the Portsmouth Spartans
- Eddie Robinson – winningest coach in NCAA Division I football history at Grambling State University 1942–1997
- Reggie Roby – punter (three-time Pro Bowl Selection) for the Miami Dolphins
- Bob Sanders – free agent safety, member of the Indianapolis Colts' Super Bowl XLI championship team
- Tyler Sash – safety for the New York Giants' Super Bowl XLVI championship team
- Zud Schammel – NFL guard
- Sedrick Shaw - running back drafted by the New England Patriots and finished his career with the Cincinnati Bengals
- Duke Slater – NFL linebacker 1922–1931
- Scott Slutzker – NFL player
- Larry Station – two-time All-American player
- Bob Stoops – player and coach; former head coach at the University of Oklahoma
- Mark Stoops – player; head coach of the University of Kentucky
- Mike Stoops – player, coach; defensive coordinator at Oklahoma
- Geno Stone - Safety for the Cincinnati Bengals
- Tory Taylor – Australian-born punter 2020–2023; unanimous All American 2023; current player for the Chicago Bears
- Sherwyn Thorson – CFL player 1962–1968
- Andre Tippett – Hall of Fame linebacker for the New England Patriots
- Emlen Tunnell – player; first African American to play for the New York Giants; later played for the Green Bay Packers
- Lukas Van Ness – NFL defensive end for the Green Bay Packers
- Kaden Wetjen - Wide receiver for the Pittsburgh Steelers
- Tristan Wirfs - Offensive tackle for the Tampa Bay Buccaneers
- Clyde Williams – coach and athletic director at Iowa State 1907–1919
- Marshal Yanda – Pro Bowl offensive lineman for the Ravens; member of Super Bowl XLVII championship team

=== Mixed martial arts ===
- Jordan Johnson – professional mixed martial artist, currently with the UFC
- Julie Kedzie – two-time Hook n' Shoot Tournament Champion, National Karate Champion; fought in first women's MMA match on cable television

=== Swimming ===
- Paul Brechler – athletic director at Iowa and commissioner of the Western Athletic Conference
- Lincoln Hurring – swam in 1952 and 1956 Olympics for New Zealand
- Wally Ris – 1948 Olympic swimmer, winner of two gold medals
- Bowen Stassforth – 1952 Olympic silver medalist swimmer 200 m breaststroke, former world record holder in 200 and 100 breaststroke
- Rafał Szukała – 1992 Olympic silver medalist in 100 butterfly for Poland
- Artur Wojdat – 1988 Olympic bronze medalist in 400 free, former world record holder in 400 freestyle

=== Tennis ===
- Kareem Al Allaf (born 1998) – American tennis player who has played for Syria and the US; holds the all-time wins record for singles and doubles combined in college tennis at the university
- Steve Wilkinson – tennis player and coach, member of the United States Professional Tennis Association's Hall of Fame and the ITA Men's Collegiate Tennis Hall of Fame

=== Track and field ===
- Kineke Alexander – 400m runner competed in 2008, 2012, and 2016 Olympics
- George Baird – ran 4x400 at 1928 Olympics
- Charles Brookins – 400m hurdles at 1924 Olympics
- Chan Coulter – 400m hurdles at 1924 Olympics
- Francis X. Cretzmeyer – track and field coach, 1948–78; coached Ted Wheeler and Deacon Jones (1956 and 1960 Olympics)
- Frank Cuhel – 1928 Olympic silver medalist in 400 hurdles
- Nan Doak – marathoner
- Troy Doris – triple jumper in 2016 Olympics
- Rich Ferguson – ran 5000m at 1952 Olympics
- Ed Gordon – long jumped at the 1928 Olympics
- Deacon Jones – 1956 and 1960 Olympics, track and field
- Anthuan Maybank – 1996 Olympic Games gold medalist in the men's 4x400 meter relay for the US
- Ira Murchison – former world record holder in 100 yard dash and Olympic gold medalist in 4x100
- Diane Nukuri – competed in 2000, 2012, 2016, and 2020 Olympics in various distance events
- Harold Phelps – ran 5000m at 1924 Olympics
- Mel Rosen – track coach
- George Saling – Olympic hurdler who won the 110-meter hurdles in the 1932 Summer Olympics
- Jenny Spangler – ran marathon in 1996 Olympics
- Laulauga Tausaga – thrower
- Ted Wheeler – 1500 meters at 1956 Olympics
- Eric Wilson – 400m runner at 1924 Olympics
- Bashir Yamini – long jumper and football player

=== Wrestling ===
- Royce Alger – 2x NCAA Champion (87' & 88') and retired mixed martial artist
- Ed Banach – light heavyweight gold medalist at 1984 Olympic Games, Los Angeles
- Lou Banach – heavyweight gold medalist at 1984 Olympic Games, Los Angeles
- Stub Barron
- Paul Bradley – two-time NCAA All-American; professional mixed martial artist, formerly with the UFC and currently with Bellator
- Terry Brands – NCAA Champion in 1990 and 1992, 2000 Olympic bronze medalist, and two-time World freestyle Champion in 1993 & 1995
- Tom Brands – Outstanding Wrestler Award at the 1992 NCAA Tournament; World Champion in 1993; Olympic Champion in 1996
- Rico Chiapparelli – NCAA Champ in 1987; mixed martial arts trainer
- Barry Davis – bantamweight silver medalist 1984 Olympic Games, Los Angeles
- Ettore Ewen – professional wrestler for WWE under the name "Big E"
- Randall Lewis – featherweight gold medalist at 1984 Olympic Games
- Terrence McCann – Olympic gold medalist in 1960 freestyle bantamweight class
- Lincoln McIlravy – Olympic bronze medalist in 2000 freestyle welterweight class
- Brent Metcalf – 2008 and 2010 NCAA Champion; 2008 Dan Hodge Trophy winner
- Steve Mocco – 2003 NCAA Division I Champion at Heavyweight; 2008 Olympic team member; current professional MMA fighter
- Tony Ramos – 2014 NCAA Champion
- E. G. Schroeder – first wrestling and tennis coach at Iowa, athletic director
- Joe Williams – three-time NCAA Champion; 2001 and 2005 wrestling world bronze medalist
- Bill Zadick – 1996 NCAA Wrestling Champion, 2006 World Champion
- Mike Zadick – 2006 wrestling world silver medalist
- Jim Zalesky – three-time NCAA Champion; current coach for Oregon State University

=== Other ===
- Paul Brechler – athletic director at Iowa and commissioner of the Western Athletic Conference
- Houry Gebeshian – Armenian Olympic gymnast at the 2016 Summer Olympics
- Laurie Mabry – professor at Illinois State University and former president of the Association for Intercollegiate Athletics for Women
