= Schnieders =

Schnieders is a German occupational surname for a tailor. Notable people with this name include:

- Andreas Schnieders (1966–2022), German boxer
- Richard J. Schnieders, American chief operating officer
