= William H. Calvin =

American academic (born 1939)

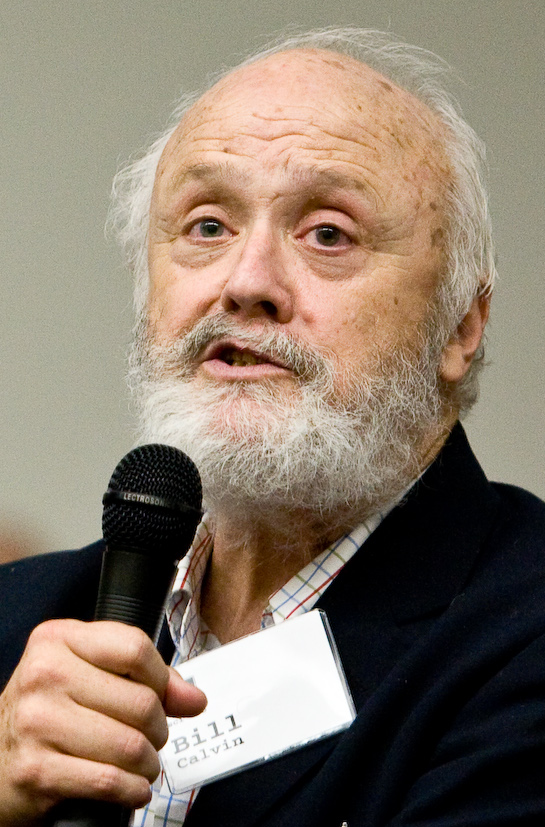
- Calvin in 2008
- Born: April 30, 1939 (age 87); Kansas City, Missouri, U.S.
- Education: Northwestern University, BA honors in physics, 1961. University of Washington, Ph.D., Physiology & Biophysics, 1966
- Scientific career
- Fields: Physiology, Biophysics, Neurophysiology, Bioanthropology, Climate Science
- Workplaces: University of Washington
- Doctoral advisor: Charles F. Stevens
- Website: williamcalvin.com

William H. Calvin (born April 30, 1939) is an American theoretical neurophysiologist and professor at the University of Washington in Seattle. He is known for popularizing neuroscience and evolutionary biology, including the hybrid of those two fields, neural Darwinism. He relates abrupt climate change to human evolution and more recently has been working on global climate change issues.

In his 1996 book How Brains Think: Evolving Intelligence, Then and Now, Calvin writes as an advocate of the idea that brain-based Darwinian processes are what provides brains with what are called "consciousness" and "intelligence". Calvin starts with the harmless division of brain processes into two types, those that depend on "cerebral ruts" (hardware) and those that dance more freely through the brain and so are able to function like "software"; Calvin usually calls these "firing patterns".

In his research monograph The Cerebral Code, Calvin suggests that the pattern of action potentials in any particular neocortical minicolumn can be replicated and spread through the cortex like a piece of software code and be "played" on the millions of other minicolumns in the same way one can play a million copies of a compact disc (CD) on a million CD players – the key difference being that while all CD players are designed to do basically the same task, the various cortical minicolumns can all have their own unique "ruts" and the copies of the firing patterns are not exact duplicates.

This allows for a "cerebral symphony" rather than just a million-fold amplification of the same tune and a "survival of the fittest" process whereby those firing patterns that resonate best with the existing pool of "ruts" will dominate one's consciousness and generate intelligent behavior ("Our long train of connected thoughts is why our consciousness is so different from what came before.").

In writing about what mind will become, in A Brief History of the Mind he notes, "We will likely shift gears again, juggling more concepts and making decisions even faster, imagining courses of action in greater depth. Ethics are possible only because of a human level of ability to speculate, judge quality, and modify our possible actions accordingly."

William H. Calvin has advanced the view that use of the Acheulean hand axe in hominids was a major factor in the evolution in human intelligence.

== Books ==
- Inside the Brain (with George A. Ojemann, New York:New American Library, 1980).
- The Throwing Madonna: Essays on the Brain (New York: McGraw-Hill, 1983. Update 1991 by Bantam.)
- The River That Runs Uphill: A Journey from the Big Bang to the Big Brain (New York: Macmillan, 1986. ISBN 0-02-520920-5)
- The Cerebral Symphony: Seashore Reflections on the Structure of Consciousness (New York: Bantam Books, 1990. ISBN 0-553-05707-3)
- The Ascent of Mind: Ice Age Climates and the Evolution of Intelligence (New York: Bantam Books, 1991. ISBN 0-553-07084-3)
- How the Shaman Stole the Moon: The Search of Ancient Prophet-Scientists: From Stonehenge to the Grand Canyon (New York: Bantam Books, 1991. ISBN 0-553-07740-6)
- Conversations with Neil's Brain: The Neural Nature of Thought and Language (with George A. Ojemann)
- How Brains Think: Evolving Intelligence, Then and Now (New York: Basic Books, 1996. ISBN 0-465-07277-1)
- The Cerebral Code: Thinking a Thought in the Mosaics of the Mind (Cambridge, MA: MIT Press, 1996)
- Lingua ex Machina: Reconciling Darwin and Chomsky with the Human Brain (with Derek Bickerton) (Cambridge, MA: MIT Press, 2000. ISBN 0-262-03273-2)
- A Brain for All Seasons: Human Evolution and Abrupt Climate Change (Chicago: University of Chicago Press, 2002. ISBN 0-226-09201-1)
- A Brief History of the Mind: From Apes to Intellect and Beyond (New York: Oxford University Press, 2004. ISBN 0-19-515907-1)
- Almost Us: Portraits of the Apes (2005, ISBN 1-4196-1979-9)
- Global Fever: How to Treat Climate Change (Chicago and London: University of Chicago Press, 2008). ISBN 0-226-09204-6. Japanese translation, 2020.
- The Great Climate Leap: A Climate Surprise Is Like a Heart Attack (Seattle; ClimateBooks, 2012), ISBN 978-1-4751-4934-0.
- The Great CO2 Cleanup: Backing Out of the Danger Zone (Seattle: ClimateBooks, 2012), ISBN 978-1-4751-5174-9.
- Extreme Weather and What to Do About It (Seattle: CO2Foundation.org, 2019), ISBN 978-1-6760-2537-5.
