= Charles Lynch =

Charles Lynch may refer to:

- Charles Lynch (judge) (1736–1796), Virginia militia officer, probable source of term "lynch law"
- Charles Lynch (politician) (1783–1853), Governor of Mississippi
- Charles Francis Lynch (1884–1942), American judge
- Charlie Lynch (1891–1968), Australian rugby league coach
- Charles Lynch (pianist) (1906–1984), Irish pianist
- Charles Lynch (journalist) (1919–1994), Canadian journalist
- Charles C. Lynch (born 1962), former owner of a Morro Bay, California medical marijuana dispensary
- Charles F. Lynch (fl. 1970s–2010s), cancer researcher, professor at the University of Iowa
- Charles Dalton Lynch (fl. 1910s), architect
- Charles W. Lynch (1851–1932), West Virginia politician and judge

== See also ==
- Charles Lynch Award, Canadian journalism award
