= Tappy =

Tappy may refer to:

- Duncan Tappy (born 1984), British racing driver
- Éric Tappy (1931-2024), Swiss operatic tenor
- Tappy Phillips (born 1948), American news correspondent
- Art Larsen (1925–2012), American tennis player nicknamed "Tappy"
- Tapishwar Narain Raina (1921–1980), Indian general and diplomat, 9th Chief of the Army Staff of the Indian Army, nicknamed "Tappy"
- Bill Tapia (1908–2011), American musician also known as "Tappy"
- Tappi Iwase, Japanese video game music composer sometimes credited as TAPPY
