= Cantine =

Cantine is a surname. Notable people with the surname include:

- David Cantine (born 1939), Canadian painter
- James Cantine (1861–1940), American missionary, scholar, and traveler
- John Cantine (1735–1808), American politician
- Moses I. Cantine (1774–1823), American politician, judge, and newspaper editor
