= The HON Company =

American business furniture manufacturer

- Company type: Subsidiary
- Founded: 1944; 82 years ago
- Headquarters: Muscatine, Iowa United States
- Key people: C. Maxwell Stanley, Clement T. Hanson and H. Wood Miller, Founders
- Products: Office furniture, chairs, workstations, tables, desks and education furniture
- Parent: HNI Corporation
- Website: www.hon.com

The HON Company designs and manufactures office furniture including chairs, cubicles, tables, desks and education furniture. Headquartered in Muscatine, Iowa, it has manufacturing facilities located throughout the United States and China, and sells its products through a nationwide network of dealers and retailers.

It is the largest operating company of HNI Corporation, the second-largest office furniture manufacturer in North America. Sister companies include Allsteel, Gunlocke, HBF, Maxon (discontinued), Kimball International and Hearth & Home Technologies.

The HON Company has factories located in Muscatine; Cedartown, Georgia; as well as distribution centers in Muscatine and Lithia Springs, Georgia. Showrooms are located in Muscatine; New York City, New York; Chicago, Illinois; and Washington, D.C.

== History ==
The HON Company was incorporated as The Home-O-Nize Company on January 6, 1944, by brothers-in-law C. Maxwell Stanley and Clement T. Hanson along with H. Wood Miller. It was founded with the intent of providing employment for those returning from duty in World War II.

The Home-O-Nize Company began in the production of kitchen cabinets; first in Davenport, Iowa, and then in the old US Button Company factory in downtown Muscatine. Following the short-lived production of kitchen cabinets, the company began manufacturing aluminum gas-bottle hoods on contract for Stampings, Inc. With the scrap left over from the hoods, they made flower-identification labels, beverage coasters and recipe card file boxes. For a brief period, The company also produced pick-up attachments for John Deere / Deere & Company combines, Iowa Corn Pickers for Associated Manufacturers Inc., and did contract work for local companies such as Red Jacket, Carver Pump, Collins Radio, G.W. Timmerman and Peter Products. In the end, it was the recipe-file boxes that paved the way for The Home-O-Nize Company's entry into the office furniture and supply industry.

In the early 1950s, the office products division of The Home-O-Nize Company became The H-O-N Division, and, in 1967, it officially became The HON Company. Their parent company, Home-O-Nize, changed its name to HON INDUSTRIES Inc. in 1968 and changed again to its current name, HNI, in 2004.

In 1980, The HON Company moved from the HON INDUSTRIES Inc. headquarters at 414 East Third Street in Muscatine into its current headquarters at 200 Oak Street, the former home of the Huttig Manufacturing Company. The HON headquarters building was renovated in 2009.

== Products ==
The HON Company provides workplace furniture for small and medium-sized businesses, universities, large corporations, schools, and government offices. Its core product offering includes workstations, desks, chairs, tables and storage.
