= Kirsten Ulve =

American graphic artist

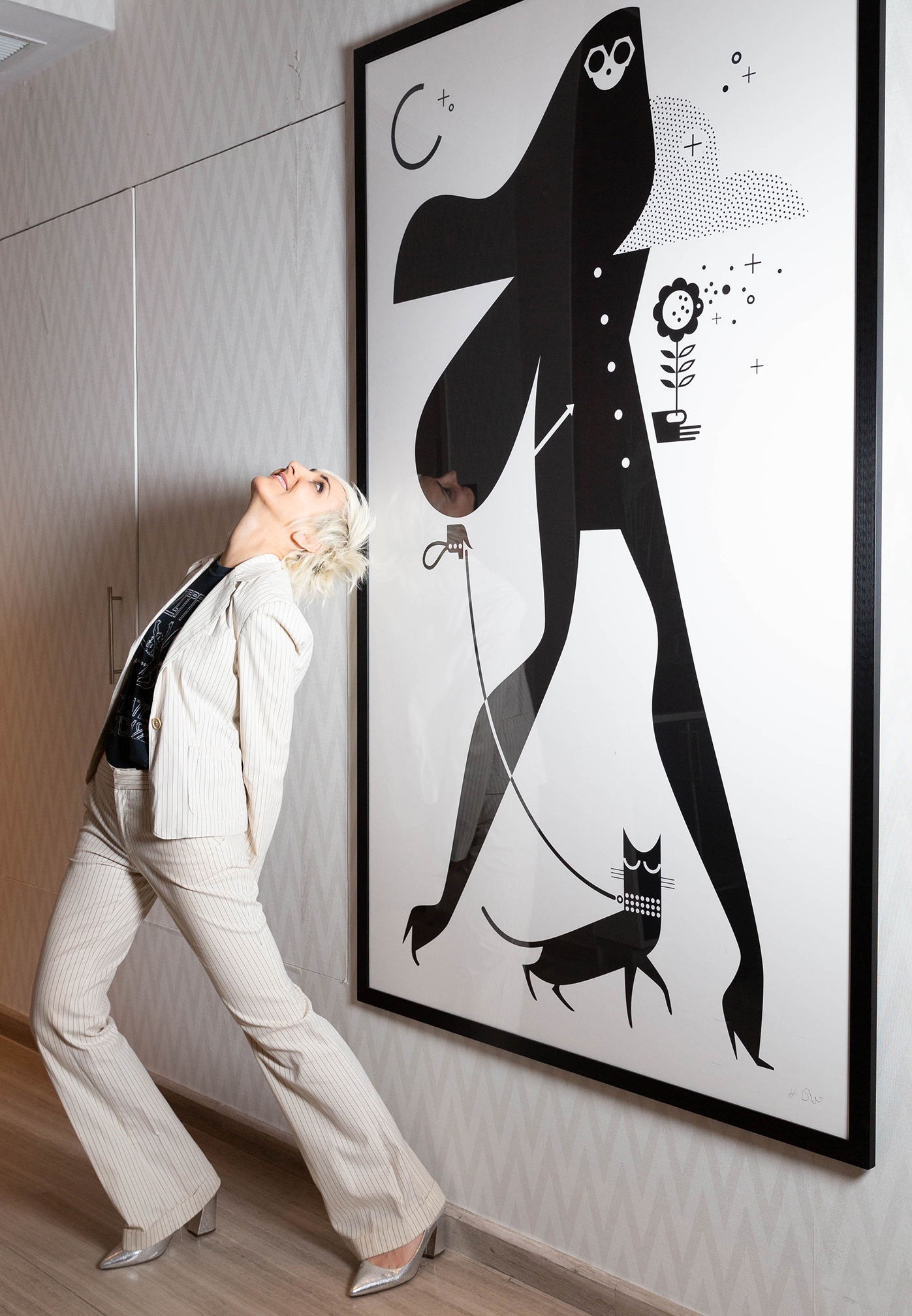
- Kirsten Ulve in front of her print, Catwalker
- Born: Dubuque, Iowa
- Occupations: Illustrator, designer
- Known for: Editorial illustration, postage stamp design, and hospitality art installations
- Notable work: USPS Holiday Delights stamp collection

Kirsten Ulve is an American illustrator and designer based in New York City. Her work spans editorial illustration, fashion illustration, stylized portraiture, character design, public art, hospitality installations, and postage stamp design.

== Early life and education ==
Ulve was born in 1967 and grew up in Dubuque, Iowa. Her mother, Charlotte Ulve, taught at Loras College and was involved in the local arts community. Her father, Edward Ulve, was a certified public accountant. She studied drawing and graphic design at the University of Iowa School of Art and Art History, where she also worked at the school’s in house graphic design studio. After graduating, she spent 6 years in Chicago working as a graphic designer and illustrator before moving to New York City to pursue illustration full time.

== Career ==
Ulve has worked with publications, brands, and organizations across editorial illustration, publishing, animation, fashion illustration and accessories, hospitality installations, and postage stamp design. Some of her print clients include The New York Times, Vogue Japan, The Los Angeles Times, Politico, The New Yorker, Glamour , Boston Magazine, Hasbro, DMagazine, Godiva, Fast Company, Harvard Business Review, Los Angeles Magazine, The Hollywood Reporter, Variety, and Entertainment Weekly.

In 2011, Ulve created the animated characters and figurines for Hasbro's Littlest Pet Shop franchise. In 2019, Ulve created permanent artwork for the INNSIDE New York NoMad hotel in New York City. In 2020, she illustrated the USPS Holiday Delights Christmas stamp collection. In 2023, Ulve created a holiday campaign for La Poste, the postal service of France.

Ulve's work has appeared in the American Illustration annual.

Ulve's work has been exhibited in galleries in New York, Los Angeles, and Tokyo.
