= University of Iowa School of Art and Art History =

Art school of the University of Iowa

Coordinates: 41°39′54.24″N 91°32′28.23″W

School of Art, Art History, and Design The University of Iowa
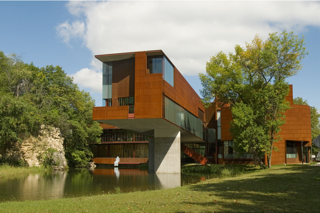

Location
- 141 North Riverside Drive; 150 ABW; University of Iowa; Iowa City, IA

Information
- Type: Public
- Motto: Ars Longa. Vita Brevis Est (Art is forever. Life is short)
- Director: Andrew Casto
- Enrollment: Approx. 650 undergraduate majors Approx. 100 graduate students
- Information: (319) 335-1376
- Website: http://www.art.uiowa.edu

The University of Iowa School of Art, Art History, and Design is the art school of the University of Iowa. It awards undergraduate and graduate degrees in art and art history. The graduate program offers Masters of Arts in art and art history, Master of Fine Arts in art, and Doctor of Philosophy in art history.

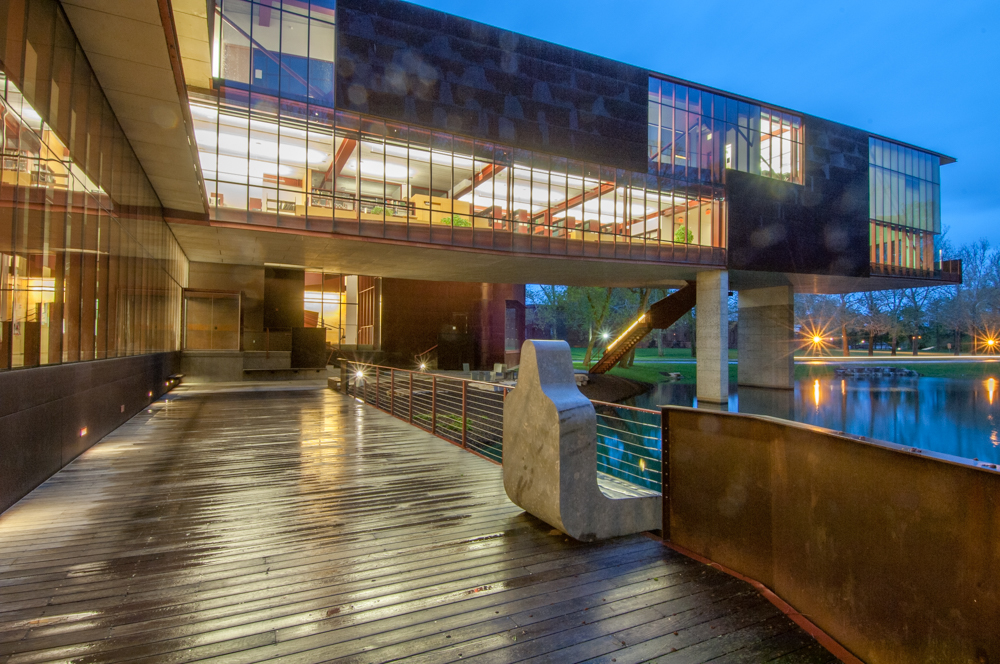
Night view of University of Iowa Art Building West.

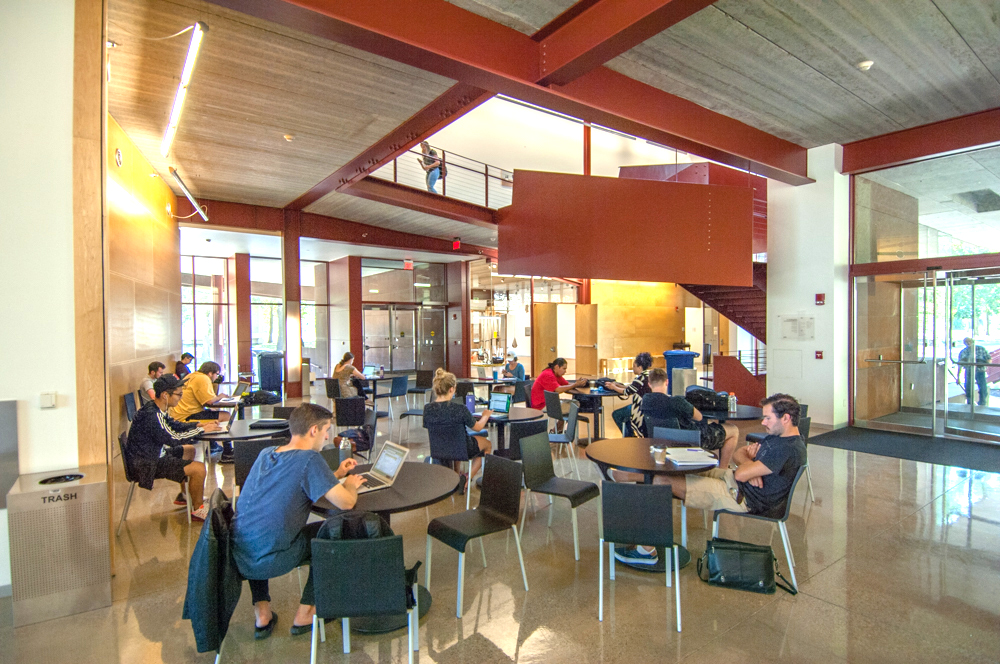
Interior view of University of Iowa Art Building West

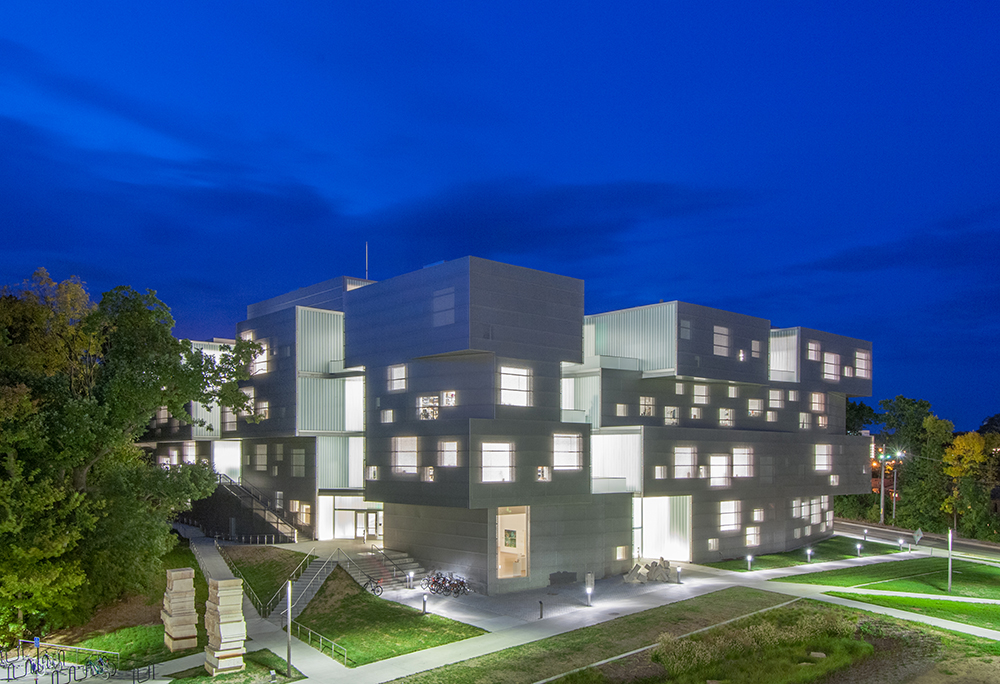
Twilight view of the University of Iowa Visual Arts Building designed by Steven Holl Architects.

== History ==
The arts were an important part of the curriculum at the University of Iowa long before the School of Art and Art History was officially established in 1936. As far back as 1882, University of Iowa students were required to take "free-hand drawing" courses. Art history was added around 1900 through the departments of philosophy and classical archaeology.

In the 1920s, the university brought art history and studio art into one department, creating a rich learning environment where studio artist would benefit by learning the history of art and art historians could better understand the studio experience. This innovative idea was copied by many institutions calling it the "Iowa Idea".

Iowa was the first major university to accept creative works, rather than written theses for graduate degrees in the arts. In 1924 the University of Iowa conferred the first graduate degree "Master's in Graphic and Plastic Arts" to Eve Drewelowe. In 1940 Elizabeth Catlett was awarded the first Master of Fine Arts degree at the University of Iowa. The University of Iowa conferred more graduate arts degrees in the nation between 1946–62 than any other university.

Grant Wood taught painting at the school from 1934–41. H. W. Janson, renown art historian, taught art history at the school from 1938–41. Philip Guston taught painting from 1941–45. Many of Guston's painting from this time show Iowa City buildings in the backgrounds.

Recognizing Iowa's innovative approach, Peggy Guggenheim donated Jackson Pollock's "Mural" to the art department in 1951.

Mauricio Lasansky taught at the School of Art and Art History from 1945–86. In September 1962, Time Magazine called Lasansky "the nation's most influential printmaker" and his University of Iowa studio "the printmaking capital of the United States."

Ana Mendieta received an MFA in intermedia from the University of Iowa in 1972. Born in Cuba, her family fled to the United States in 1961 to escape the Cuban Revolution. Mendieta's work focused on the female body and the landscape. She created photographs, videotapes and films that documented her performances and landscape sculptures. Mendieta died in September 1985 from a fall from a 34th floor apartment in New York City.

In 1969 the University of Iowa Museum of Art opened with collections from the School of Art and Art History, including the Pollock "Mural" and the Beckmann triptych "Karneval"; and the Elliott Collection, which included works by Braque, DeChirico, Kandinsky, Léger, Marc, Matisse, Picasso and Vlaminck. In the 1980s, Maxwell and Elizabeth Stanley donated one of the most important collections of African art to the museum.

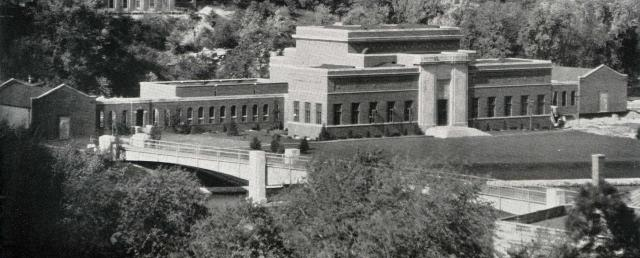
1936 University of Iowa Art Building

== Facilities ==
In 1936, the University of Iowa constructed a new home for the School of Art and Art History. Built with help from the Rockefeller and Carnegie foundations, the building's design is based on Palladian villas. Several new buildings were added to the arts campus in 1968 including a new printmaking wing, ceramics studios, sculpture foundry, and jewelry/metalsmithing studios. In 2006 Steven Holl designed a new building for the School adjacent to quarry pond. Art Building West received the RIBA International Award and the American Institute of Architects Honor Award for Architecture in 2007.

The Iowa flood of 2008 damaged the 1936 Art Building and Steven Holl's Art Building West. Art Building West was restored and re-opened January 2012. The 1936 Art Building will be retained on campus as an historic property, but many of its functions have been moved to a new visual arts building designed by Steven Holl opened in the fall of 2016.

== Areas and programs of study ==
- Art history division
- Studio division
  - 3D design
  - Ceramics
  - Graphic design
  - Sculpture and Intermedia
  - Jewelry and metal arts
  - Painting and drawing
  - Photography
  - Printmaking

== Degrees offered ==
=== Undergraduate degrees ===
Undergraduate degrees include:

- Bachelor of Arts (B.A.) in Art
- Bachelor of Arts (B.A.) in Art history
- Bachelor of Fine Arts (B.F.A.) in Art

=== Graduate degrees ===
Graduate degrees include:

- Master of Fine Arts (M.F.A.) in Art
- Master of Arts (M.A.) in Art history
- Doctor of Philosophy (Ph.D.) in Art history

== Graduate archive ==
For the past seventy-five years the School of Art, Art History, and Design has documented thousands of artworks by artists attending the school's graduate studio programs. Each graduate student was required to leave behind a work or images of the work they completed during their graduate studies here at the University of Iowa. The graduate archive contains over 13,000 images of paintings, prints, photographs, sculptures and other art objects. The archive is unique in the country and provides a critical glimpse of academic American art over much of the last century.
