= Shirley Briggs =

American artist, photographer, writer, editor, and naturalist

- Born: May 12, 1918; Iowa City, Iowa
- Died: November 11, 2004 (aged 86); Derwood, Maryland

Shirley Ann Briggs (May 12, 1918 – November 11, 2004) was an American artist, photographer, writer, editor, and naturalist. She spent a large portion of her career participating in efforts to inform the public about the environment in regards to synthetic chemicals such as pesticides. A talented artist and writer, Briggs would often use the combination of her understanding environmental hazards (such as pesticides) with her artistic skills to achieve her goals in regard to environmental education. After graduate school she moved to Baltimore to work for Glenn L. Martin Company as a mechanical arts illustrator and would later move on to work for the U.S Fish and Wildlife Service. She also worked as chief of the Bureau of Reclamation's graphics sections and drew diagrams for the Smithsonian Institution's National Museum of Natural History. After Rachel Carson's passing in 1964 Briggs became the executive director of the Rachel Carson Council (without pay) between the years of 1970 and 1992. She served as an essential editor and illustrator of a number of Rachel Carson's works.

== Early life and education ==
Shirley Briggs was born on May 12, 1918, in Iowa City, Iowa, the only child of Nellie and John Ely Briggs, a professor of political science at the University of Iowa. She graduated from University High School and later attended the University of Iowa for both her undergraduate and master's degrees. In 1939, she graduated summa cum laude from the University of Iowa, having earned a B.A in Art, Art History, and Botany. She then went on to get an M.A in Art and Art History in 1940. During her time at Iowa, she studied under Grant Wood, painter of American Gothic. In 1995, Briggs received the Distinguished Alumni Award from the University of Iowa.

== Career ==
=== Glenn L. Martin Company ===
After graduating from the University of Iowa, Shirley Briggs briefly taught art at North Dakota State College. However, after many of her students were drafted into military service during World War II, she decided to change professions. Recommended by fellow alum of the University of Iowa, Katherine Howe, she became an illustrator for the Glenn L. Martin Company in Baltimore. There, she illustrated airplane manuals for use by servicemen.

=== United States Fish and Wildlife Service ===
In late 1945, Briggs moved on to work as an information specialist and illustrator for the United States Fish and Wildlife Service, a branch of the U.S. Department of the Interior, where she provided artwork and writing for a number of publications.

=== U.S Bureau of Reclamation and Smithsonian Institution’s Museum of Natural History ===
In 1947, Briggs became the Chief of the Graphic section of the Bureau of Reclamation after her previous position with the U.S. Fish and Wildlife Service was given to a war veteran. She remained in this position for seven years, working on graphics for a number of uses, such as hearings and museum exhibits. Beginning in 1954, Briggs was also responsible for the design and creation of several of the dioramas present in the Smithsonian Institution's Museum of Natural History. Two of these dioramas were "The Pronghorn Antelope" and "The Carolina Parakeet."

=== Audubon Naturalist Society ===
In the midst of her career with the U.S. government, Shirley Briggs gained employment in the organization now known as the Audubon Naturalist Society (ANS) in 1948, where she worked as an editor of The Wood Thrush, a periodical published by the organization. This periodical was later renamed The Atlantic Naturalist, of which Briggs became the editor in chief. Her work with ANS entailed writing, photography, and other forms of art. Prior to her employment as an editor for the Society, she had volunteered in its education and publication departments. Briggs was also a longtime teacher of courses on U.S. conservation philosophy and politics for ANS and U.S. Department of Agriculture. Her contributions to the Audubon Naturalist Society resulted in her receiving the Paul Bartsch Award in 1972.

=== Rachel Carson Council ===
Upon helping found the Rachel Carson Council (then called the Rachel Carson Trust for the Living Environment) in 1965, she worked with other members to write the book A Basic Guide to Pesticides: Their Characteristics and Hazards, which was a large study about synthetic chemicals used for various purposes, such as agriculture and manufacturing. This book was published in 1992 and resulted in the Environmental Protection Agency awarding Briggs its Rachel Carson Award and the University of California awarding her the Robert Vanden Bosch Award. In her time as executive director of the Council she would edit several follow up publications concerning the life and work of Rachel Carson, including "Silent Spring: The View from 1987."

== Affiliation with Rachel Carson ==
In the 1940s, Shirley Briggs became employed with the U.S. Fish and Wildlife Service, where she worked as an illustrator. This was where she met Rachel Carson and forged their friendship through mutual friend Katherine Howe. During her employment at the U.S. Fish and Wildlife Service, Briggs contributed illustrations and writing to several of Carson's publications, such as the “Chincoteaque: A National Wildlife Refuge” illustrated pamphlet, published in 1947.

Both women were involved in the Audubon Naturalist Society, and they frequently traveled together on expeditions organized by the ANS and socialized through parties and get-togethers. A few of these included a trip during the fall of 1945 to Ocean City, a trip to Chincoteague, Virginia during 1944, camping during 1947 to Cobb Island in Virginia, and a trip to Seneca in 1947. On these trips, Briggs took a number of well-known photographs of Carson, and throughout their friendship, they also engaged in a letter correspondence. Later on, Briggs collaborated with Carson on research for the latter's book, Silent Spring.

After Rachel Carson died in 1964, Shirley Briggs worked to preserve Carson's work in Silent Spring. She wrote several papers to follow up on Carson's publication, such as "A Decade After Silent Spring," which discussed Carson's process, and "Silent Spring: The View from 1990," which described Carson's national impact and critically examined the Environmental Protection Agency's response. In 1965, Briggs and several others affiliated with Rachel Carson created the Rachel Carson Trust for the Living Environment, now called the Rachel Carson Council. Within this organization, she served as executive director from 1970-1992 without pay.

== Death ==
Shirley Ann Briggs died on November 11, 2004, from cardiopulmonary failure at a nursing home Derwood, Maryland, near her home in Bethesda, Maryland.
