= Mildred Beltre =

American Visual Artist

Mildred Beltré Martinez (born 1969) is a Brooklyn-based American multi-disciplinary artist known for activist works that focus on how social justice and grassroots movements might reconfigure society. She is co-founder of the Brooklyn Hi-Art! Machine

== Early life and education ==
Beltre was born in New York City in 1969 and grew up there. She completed undergraduate work in art and anthropology at Carleton College and received her M.F.A from the University of Iowa. She is an associate professor drawing and printmaking at the University of Vermont.

== Work ==
Beltré's collaboration with Oasa Duverney, Brooklyn Hi-Art! Machine, started as a way to give kids in the Crown Heights neighborhood of Brooklyn a creative outlet. Their ad hoc neighborhood arts camp facilitated collaborative projects such as installing a herb garden planted in recycled bottles to hang from the Franklin Avenue Shuttle tracks. In addition to solo exhibitions, Beltré has been part of group exhibitions at the Brooklyn Museum, the Everson Museum of Art in Syracuse, NY; the International Print Center New York, and the DeCordova Museum in Lincoln, MA. She has published articles in Printmaking Today.

== Awards and fellowships ==
Among the honors which Mildred Beltré has earned are:

- Media Arts Fellowship (2018)

== Selected exhibitions ==
Beltré has had solo exhibitions at galleries and institutions including:

- Eli Marsh Gallery, Amherst, MA Mildred Beltre: The Changing Same (2015)
- Burlington City Arts, Burlington, VT Mildred Beltre: Dream Work (2014)
- Kentler International Drawing Space, Brooklyn: Science of the World (2019)

== Collections ==
Mildred Beltré's work is held in permanent collections including:

- Brooklyn Museum, Brooklyn, New York, USA
- Walker Art Center, Minneapolis, Minnesota, USA
