= HNI Corporation =

American office furniture manufacturer

- Company type: Public
- Traded as: NYSE: HNI; S&P 600 component
- Founded: 1947; 79 years ago in Muscatine, Iowa U.S.
- Headquarters: Muscatine, Iowa, U.S.
- Key people: Jeffrey D. Lorenger (chairman, president, CEO); Marshall H. Bridges (senior vice president & CFO)
- Products: Furniture & fireplaces
- Revenue: ▼US$2.25 billion (2019)
- Operating income: ▼US$152.34 million (2019)
- Net income: ▼US$110.50 million (2019)
- Total assets: ▲US$1.45 billion (2019)
- Total equity: ▲US$584.37 million (2019)
- Number of employees: 7,500 (January 2021)
- Website: hnicorp.com

HNI Corporation is one of the largest office furniture manufacturers in the world in regard to revenues resulting from office segment sales. HNI is also the world's leading hearth products company, manufacturing and marketing gas, electric, wood and biomass burning fireplaces, inserts, stoves, facings and accessories. The company was founded in 1944 by engineer C. Maxwell Stanley, advertising executive Clem Hanson, and industrial designer H. Wood Miller. Its headquarters are in Muscatine, Iowa, with operations located in Muscatine, in various other U.S. states, and in Asia.

HNI's office furniture brands include The HON Company, Allsteel, Gunlocke, Maxon, HBF, OFM, and Lamex. The corporation's hearth brands, manufactured by Hearth & Home Technologies and offered through multiple retail and new construction channels, include Heatilator, Heat & Glo, Harman, Quadra-Fire, Majestic, Monessen, Fireside Hearth & Home, and Vermont Castings.

HNI acquired Kimball International in March 2023.

HNI acquired Steelcase Inc. in August 2025 for $2.2 billion.

== Awards ==
- America's Most Admired Companies, 2006 Fortune magazine
- 400 Best Big Companies in America, 1998-2006 Forbes magazine
- 50 Best Manufacturing Companies, 2002-2006 IndustryWeek
- America's Top 100 Most Trustworthy Companies, 2016-2017 Forbes magazine
- World's Best Companies for Leadership Development, 2014–2016, Chief Executive magazine
