= Robert L. Hunter =

Robert Lee "Merle" Hunter (September 4, 1898 (Note: NFL records list Hunter as having been born on September 4, 1888, however this appears to be a typo; most other sources, including his World War II Draft Card, indicate that he was born in 1898.) – July 28, 1997) was an American judge, lawyer, politician, and athlete best known for serving as the presiding judge of the Divorce Division of the Circuit Court of Cook County from the court's re-creation 1964 until his retirement in 1979. In the 1920s, Hunter played collegiate American football for the Iowa Hawkeyes and professional football in the NFL. He also wrestled for the Iowa Hawkeyes wrestling team, winning a Big Ten Conference title.

He later served as president of the Illinois Civil Service Commission for approximately eight years in the 1940s, and was the Republican Party's nominee for mayor of Chicago in 1951. Despite his long affiliation with the Republican Party, he was nominated for a Cook County Superior Court judgeship by the Democratic Party in 1962, and won election. He continued as judge after Cook County consolidated its court system into a single Circuit Court two years later.

== Early life ==
Football records state that Hunter was born September 4, 1888, in Mapleton, Iowa. Other sources, however, including his WWII Draft Card indicate he was born a decade later, in 1898, in Boone County, Iowa. in 1898. He was raised in Mapleton, where his father, John Lincoln Hunter, was the mayor. His mother, Josie Hunter, was born Josephine "Josie" Mae Chapman.

== Football and wrestling ==
Hunter played college football with the 1921 Iowa Hawkeyes football team and also competed on the Iowa Hawkeyes wrestling team. Hunter was a Big Ten Conference champion as a wrestler, and wrestled in the heavyweight class.

While later in law school, Hunter played professional football as a guard and tackle in the NFL. His weight was recorded at 185 pounds (84 kg) during his professional career. He played for the Hammond Pros, in 1926. Some later news biographies reported him having additionally having played with the Milwaukee team and the Chicago Cardinals. He played while law school, with his earnings from both playing football used to pay his tuition and other law school costs. To further raise funds for law school, he competed in some professional wrestling, and also coached wrestling.

== Early career and law career ==
For two years, Hunter worked as a high school teacher in Cherokee, Iowa, where he coached sports. He attended the University of Chicago Law School, moving to Chicago in 1924 in order to attend. While in law school, he served as the president of the Stock Yards Business and Civic Association from 1925 to 1927. He was admitted to the Illinois Bar Association in 1927. By the mid-1930s, he was a partner at the law firm Gregory, Gilruth and Hunter.

== Early politics ==
Hunter's political career began as a precinct captain for Charles S. Deneen's political machine in Chicago's 5th ward. He ran unsuccessfully in the 1936 Republican primary for Illinois's 6th congressional district (having placed second behind P. H. Moynihan in a field of six candidates). In 1938, he became the president of the Better Government Association, leading efforts to combat election fraud.

== Illinois Civil Service Commission ==
From 1941 until 1949, he served as president of the Illinois Civil Service Commission. He was a Republican member of a Democrat-led state executive branch. He continued to serve as a member beyond then, resigned from his seat in 1951 in order to run for mayor.

=== 1946 judicial campaign ===
Hunter ran in 1946 for chief justice of the Cook County courts as the Republican nominee against incumbent Edmund Jarecki. He came the closest of any challenger to Jareck in 28 years, losing by only a margin of 8,993 out of the 2.11 million votes cast. Allegations were made that fraudulent votes may have contributed to the outcome

== 1951 mayoral campaign ==
After receiving the Cook County Republican Party organization endorsement for mayor, Hunter ran for mayor of Chicago as the Republican Party nominee in 1951.

Hunter sought to tie Kennelly to polarizing Democratic president Harry S. Truman, and told voters that a defeat of Kennelly would help send a message to Truman that might dissuade him from seeking re-election in the 1952 presidential election (noting that the Cook County Democratic Party's ability to deliver a strong Democratic result in Chicago had been essential to Truman's 1948 success in carrying the state). The election became seen as an early 1951 test of political sentiments in the United States that might provide an indicator for the 1952 presidential race. Despite vociferous campaigning by Hunter, the election drew little interest from Chicagoans and Kennelly lost by a large margin in a relatively low-turnout election.

== Judge of the Circuit Court of Cook County ==
From the mid-1960s until retiring in 1979, Hunter served as a judge on the Circuit Court of Cook County.

He was elected a county judge after having been nominated by the Democratic Party in 1962 for judge of the Cook County Superior Court with the backing of the Cook County Democratic Party Central Committee (which was led by Chicago Mayor Richard J. Daley). His nomination by the local Democratic Party came despite Hunter having long previously been affiliated with the Republican Party. When Cook County's court system consolidated into a single Circuit Court in 1964, Hunter continued as judge.

After joining the newly re-formed Circuit Court, Hunter became as the presiding judge of the Divorce Division of the Circuit Court of Cook County. His tenure in the divorce division saw the creation of a nationally recognized conciliation service in the court. During his tenure, the Cook County Divorce Court was renamed to the Domestic Relations Division.

== Other roles ==
Hunter served on the boards of the YMCA and the Central Amateur Athletic Union. Hunter served as president of the Provident Hospital in the 1960s and the 1960s. In the 1960s he served as president of the Chicago branch of the United Service Organizations.

== Personal life and death ==
In 1936, Hunter married Elizabeth "Betty" Bond Corey, with whom he had two sons (John and Robert II) and two daughters (Elizabeth and Margaret). The two had met on a blind date in 1934, and in 1947 purchased a house in the Kenwood neighborhood wehere they raised their children.

In the 1960s, Elizabeth Hunter oversaw an investigation into allegations of vote fraud in the 1960 United States presidential election in Illinois that briefly threatened a possible challenge to certification of John F. Kennedy's critical win in the state. Hunter was widowed in 1973. He married secondly, to Laura, who had been his divorce court secretary. He sold his Kenwood House after remarrying, and moved to a 42nd-floor condominium in the Gold Coast neighborhood.

Hunter owned farms in both Wisconsin and Illinois. He owned a prize-winning bull named "Ravenglen Genuis Triune" (born in 1955). It won All American Honors, and was later sold to Japan when that country was seeking to improve the quality of its own cattle through crossbreeding with imported cattle.

Hunter died on July 28, 1997 at his residence in the Near North Side of Chicago, aged 98.
