= Laurie Mabry =

American professor

Laurene Mabry
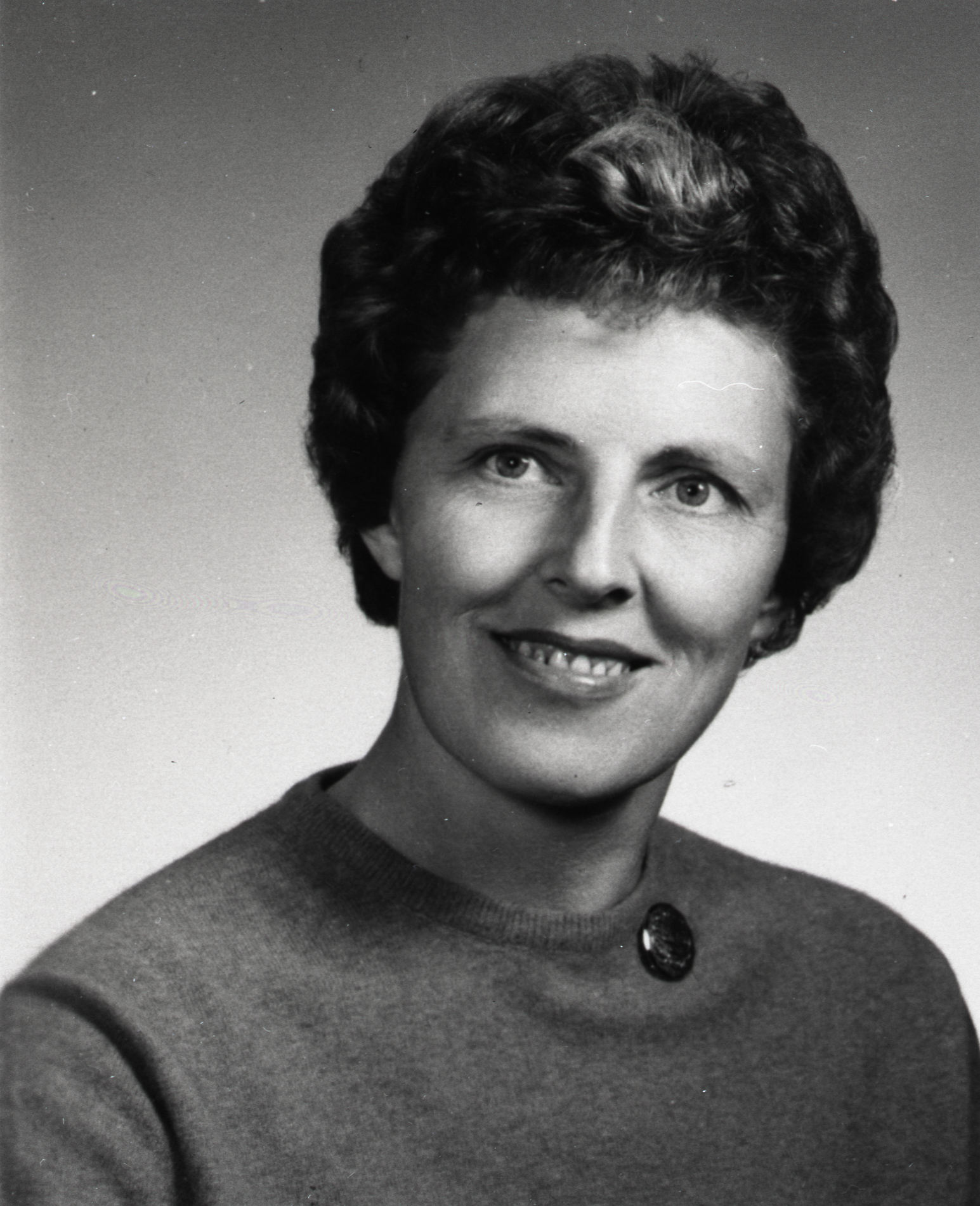
- Born: August 31, 1929; Vandalia, Illinois, United States
- Died: October 16, 2015 (aged 86); Vandalia, Illinois, United States
- Occupation: Mathematics Professor
- Years active: 1960-1980

Laurene "Laurie" Mabry (August 31, 1929 – October 16, 2015) was an American professor of health and physical education at Illinois State University, and former president of the Association for Intercollegiate Athletics for Women. During her professional career, Mabry organized the first women's collegiate basketball championship in the United States, and played a key role in the inclusion of women's sports under Title IX.

== Early life ==
Mabry was born on August 31, 1929, in Vandalia, Illinois, to Joe Ewing “Cotton” Mabry and Margaret F. Eller-Mabry. Mabry developed an early interest in athletics, learning golf from her uncle and softball from her father, who was a coach. While enrolled at Vandalia Community High School, she served as the president of the Girls Athletic Association and was a member of the intramural basketball team. In 1947, Mabry graduated as the valedictorian of her class. After graduation, she attended Northwestern University, where she received her Bachelor of Science in physical education. In the following years, she obtained her master's degree at Purdue University and her doctorate at the University of Iowa.

== Career ==
Mabry's professional career began at Illinois State University in the fall of 1960, as she joined the faculty as an instructor in health and physical education. During her first year as a professor, Mabry created and coached the university's first women's extramural golf team, as well as an advisor for the WRA, or the Women's Recreational Association. The following year, she became the sponsor for this association. In 1966, Mabry entered the tenured-track and became an assistant professor of Health and Physical Education. After ISU's Athletic Board was disbanded following an NCAA investigation in 1971, Mabry became one of the three members of ISU's new Athletic Council the following year. Early into her term as a member of this Athletic Council, Mabry, alongside Jill Hutchison, organized the nation's first women's collegiate basketball championship, taking place at Illinois State's Horton Field House. In 1973, Mabry began her two-year position as the Commissioner of Championships for the Association for Intercollegiate Athletics for Women. In 1975, she began her term as the President of the association shortly before it was replaced by the NCAA as the national governing body for college women's athletics. Mabry retired from Illinois State University in 1980.

== Death ==
Mabry died on October 16, 2015, in Vandalia, Illinois, at the Vandalia Rehab and Health Care Center.

== Legacy and Role in Title IX Regulations ==
While serving as president of the AIAW in 1975, Laure Mabry played a key role in establishing equality in women's sports through Title IX. Mabry testified before a Congressional committee against the “Tower Amendment,” which attempted to exempt revenue-generating sports as qualifiers for Title IX. Soon after, Title IX was expanded to include women's sports by regulations enacted by Congress and signed into law by President Ford.
