= Shardé M. Davis =

Afro-American academic

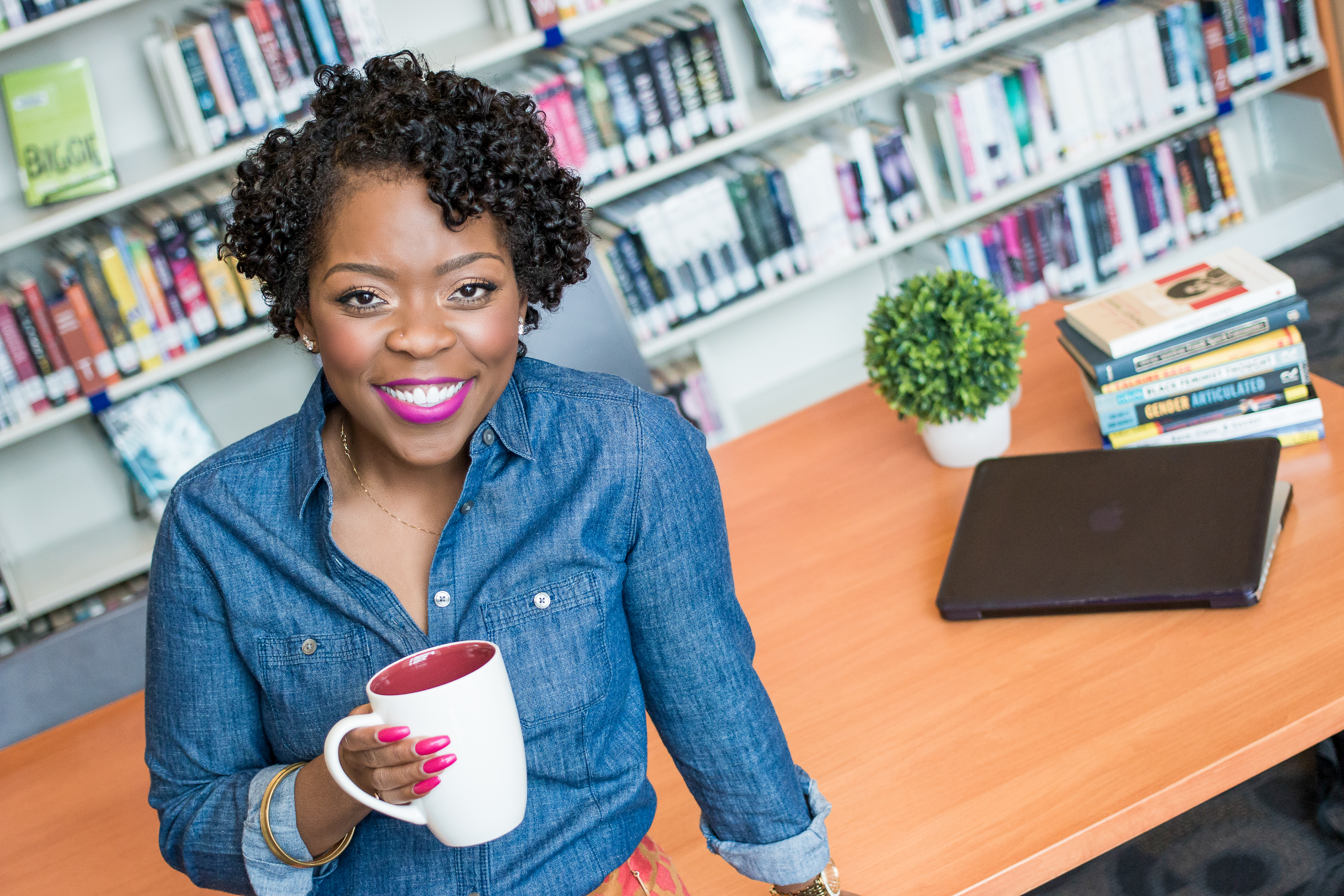
- Education: University of California, Santa Barbara (BA Communication, MA Communication); University of Iowa (Ph.D. in Communication Studies and a doctoral certificate in Gender, Women's, and Sexuality Studies)
- Occupation: academic

Shardé M. Davis is an Afro-American academic who created the hashtag #BlackintheIvory, which was popularised on Twitter in the wake of widespread protests following the murder of George Floyd.

== Early life ==
As an undergraduate, Davis attended the University of California, Santa Barbara, where she earned a B.A. in Communication and Feminist Studies and an M.A. in Communication. At UCSB she was funded through the Ronald E. McNair Scholars Program, and awarded the Steven H. Chaffee Undergraduate Research Award from the Department of Communication. She completed her Ph.D. in Communication with a doctoral certificate in Gender, Women, and Sexuality Studies at the University of Iowa.

== Career ==
Davis is an Assistant Professor in the Department of Communication and a faculty affiliate of the Africana Studies Institute and the Institute for Collaboration on Health, Intervention, and Policy (InCHIP) at the University of Connecticut. She specializes in interpersonal communication, with a focus on "how Black women's complex identities - and the power laden social structures that shape them - influence the way they communicate with close others". Additionally, her research investigates "communication behaviour of other marginalized groups, like the elderly, people of color, financially-strained families, and divorcing couples". These ideas have been published in over 30 peer-refereed articles and invited book chapters, and are best represented in her article, "The 'Strong Black Woman Collective': A Developing Theoretical Framework for Understanding Collective Communication Practices of Black Women". Her research was formally recognized with the 2018 American Postdoctoral Fellowship from the American Association of University Women and the 2019 Ford Foundation Postdoctoral Fellowship.

== #BlackintheIvory ==
in June 2020, Davis established the hashtag #BlackintheIvory with her friend Joy Woods, a doctoral student at the University of Texas-Austin. The hashtag, used on Twitter, was designed as a forum to amplify the voices of "Blackademics" to speak truth about racism in academia. Woods first used the hashtag on Twitter, tweeting:

"Hey folks, so I want my Black scholars if they're comfortable to share their experience with higher ed institutions #BlackInTheIvory I've started sharing. On Instagram. Shout out to @DrShardeDavis for the idea."

Subsequently, it went viral in the United States and across the world, with Times Higher Education identifying it as a "tidal wave" of "black scholars" sharing their "lived experiences of discrimination and alienation" at higher educational institutions. As of November 11, 2020, the account had 9,864 followers. Since creating #BlackintheIvory, Davis has been featured in several media interviews and podcasts to share her views on the intersections of racial and academic identity.

== Awards and honors ==
- 2018 - 100 Women of Color Gala, presented by June Archer and Eleven28 Entertainment.
- 2020 - Golden Anniversary Monograph Award for "The Strong Black Woman Collective Theory: Determining the Prosocial Functions of Strength Regulation in Groups of Black Women Friends," published in Journal of Communication in 2019 (co-authored with Tamara D. Afifi).

== Selected publications ==
- Cox, J., Gailliard, B., & Davis, S. M. (2019). Transformation or assimilation?: Examining identity and organizational tensions at Full-Figured Fashion Week. Departures in Critical Qualitative Research, 8(3), 29–45. doi: 10.1525/dcqr.2019.8.3.29
- Davis, S. M., & Afifi, T. (2019). The strong Black woman collective theory: Determining the prosocial functions of strength regulation in groups of Black women friends. Journal of Communication, 69(1), 1-25. doi: 10.1093/joc/jqy065. Lead article.
- Davis, S. M., & High, A. (2019). Widening the gap: Support gaps in same race vs. different race female friendship dyads. Journal of Social and Personal Relationships, 36(1), 187–213. doi: 10.1177/0265407517722245
- Davis, S. M. (2019). When sistahs support sistahs: A process of supportive communication about microaggressions among Black women. Communication Monographs, 89(2), 133-157. doi: 10.1080/03637751.2018.1548769
- Davis, S. M. (2018). Taking back the power: An analysis of Black women's communicative resistance. Review of Communication, 18(4), 301-318. doi: 10.1080/15358593.2018.1461234
- Davis, S. M. (2018). The aftermath of #BlackGirlsRock vs. #WhiteGirlsRock: Considering the disrespectability of a Black woman counterpublic. Women's Studies in Communication, 41(3), 269–290. doi: 10.1080/07491409.2018.1505678. Lead article.
- Afifi, Tamara D., Anne F. Merrill, and Sharde Davis. "The Theory of Resilience and Relational Load." Personal Relationships 23, no. 4 (2016): 663–83. .
- Davis, S. M. (2015). The "strong Black woman collective": A developing theoretical framework for understanding collective communication practices of Black women. Women's Studies in Communication, 38(1), 20–35. doi:10.1080/07491409.2014.953714.
- Afifi, Tamara, Sharde Davis, Anne F. Merrill, Samantha Coveleski, Amanda Denes, and Walid Afifi. "In the Wake of the Great Recession: Economic Uncertainty, Communication, and Biological Stress Responses in Families." Human Communication Research 41, no. 2 (2015): 268–302. .
