= 1951 Chicago mayoral election =

- April 3, 1951
- Turnout: 56.8% ▼13.51 pp
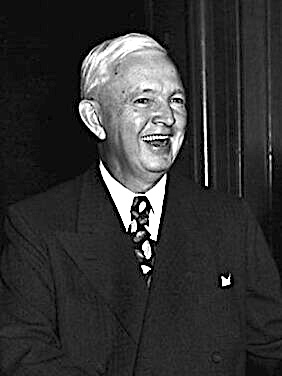

Nominee	Martin H. Kennelly	Robert L. Hunter
Party	Democratic	Republican
Popular vote	697,871	545,326
Percentage	56.14%	43.87%
Mayor before election
Martin H. Kennelly
Democratic
Elected Mayor
Martin H. Kennelly
Democratic

The Chicago mayoral election of 1951 was held on April 3, 1951. The election saw Democrat Martin H. Kennelly being reelected for a second term, defeating Republican Robert L. Hunter by a double-digit margin.

== Background ==
The state of Illinois in 1944 had passed legislation which aimed to tighten the state's previously overly-lax voter registration laws. One measure of this was that, after the November elections in presidential election years, county clerks would begin the process canceling the registration of those who had not voted in the previous four years. There were a number of other measures which would result in the cancellation of voter registrations.

== Nominations ==
For the first time in more than 50 years, no primary elections were held for mayor (Chicago had first instituted direct primary elections for mayoral nominations in 1911). This was because each party had had only a single candidate qualify to run for its nomination. Incumbent mayor Martin Kennelly was the only candidate to seek the Democratic nomination. Robert L. Hunter was the only candidate left seeking the nomination of the Republican Party. Additionally, the two parties' nominations for city clerk and treasurer were also uncontested. With none of the nominations for citywide offices being contested, the Chicago Board of Election Commissioners ruled that these offices would be excluded from ballots in the citywide primaries elections on February 21 and the candidates that had registered for the nominations would become the nominees by default. This would save the city money, as in certain wards in which aldermanic nominations for a party were uncontested they would be able run the elections with a reduced number of polling places and ballot papers required.

=== Democratic nomination ===
Incumbent mayor Martin Kennelly became the Democratic nominee unopposed.

=== Republican nomination ===
Originally seeking the Republican nomination was congressman and former judge Edgar A. Jonas. However, in early January, Jonas made a surprise withdrawal from the election. The Cook County Republican Party organization thereafter gave their endorsement to Hunter, who resigned from his seat on the Illinois Civil Service Commission in order to run for mayor. After Walter E. Pancanowski's candidacy petition was rejected, Hunter was left the only candidate seeking the party's nomination and won it by default. Competing with Green for the committee's endorsement was Alderman Reginald DuBois (of the 9th ward) and lawyer George A. Lennon.

Hunter had previously twice unsuccessfully sought elected office. He had run unsuccessfully in the 1936 Republican primary for Illinois's 6th congressional district (having placed second behind P. H. Moynihan in a field of six candidates). He also ran in 1946 for chief justice of the Cook County courts. He had also played college football with the 1921 Iowa Hawkeyes football team and professional football with the Hammond Pros.

== General election ==
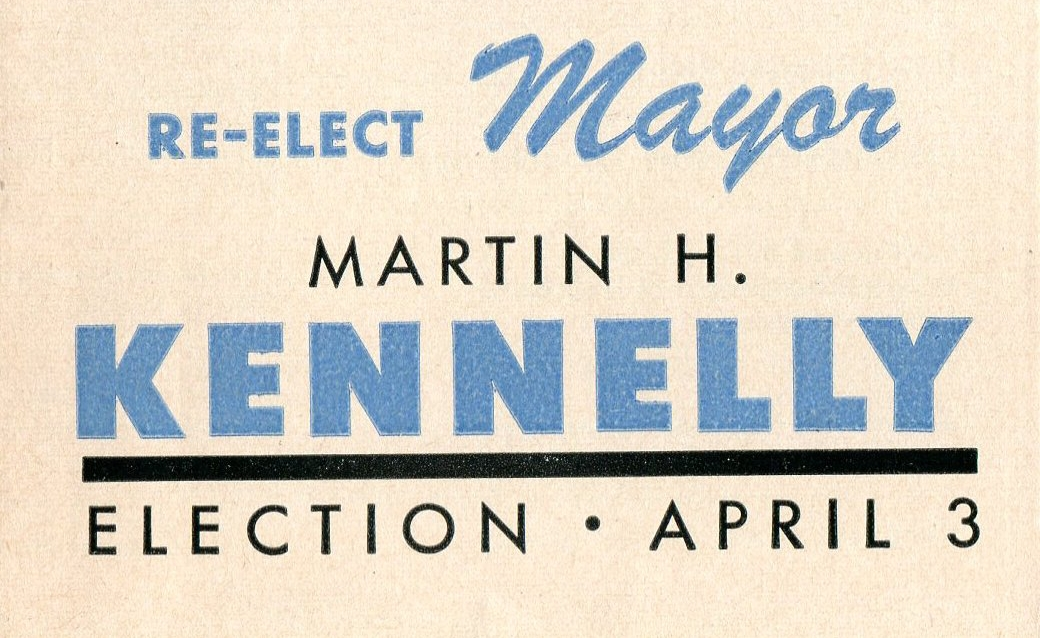
Wordmark from Kennelly's reelection campaign material, 1951.

Hunter attacked Kennelly, characterizing him as a "do-nothing mayor". He called for the defeat of not just Kenelly, but of the political machine that had put him forth for mayor. He argued that big-city Democratic machines needed to be defeated in order to save the country.

The Chicago Tribune and Hunter's candidacy were initially closely linked. Hunter would meet twice or thrice weekly with the newspaper's editor Don Maxwell. He effectively adopted their editorials as his own campaign platform. For instance, he adopted the Tribune's stance against municipal ownership of the water supply. The Tribune, and therefore Hunter, blamed the local Democratic Party for having helped President Harry S. Truman win reelection. They therefore litigated what they regarded to have been Truman's misdeeds as presidents, including extending New Deal policies and entering the nation into the Korean War. Local Republicans campaigning for Hunter, including Senator Everett Dirksen, regularly focused their campaign on national and international issues such as the Cold War and the Korean War. They also accused Kennelly of "dodging" national issues. Illinois' Democratic Governor Adlai Stevenson II derided the Republicans' national-politics focused approach to a local election as, "a political absurdity". The Tribune weakened its support of Hunter after he attacked Commonwealth Edison's new contract with the city under Kennelly, since the chairman of the board for Commonwealth Edison was also on Tribune Company board of directors. Hunter had accused that Kennelly helped the company win a new municipal contract, despite several Chicago City Council members having objected that the terms "did not adequately protect the city's interests."

Advertisement printed in The Chicago Defender by the Citizens Committee, targeting African-American voters and attacking Kennelly for failing to keep promises to them

Hunter also alleged that Kennelly had caused a 300% increase in narcotics use among Chicago youth during the course of his mayoralty. He pledged, "Give me command of the city’s army of more than 7,000 policemen, and I will break the back of the drug traffic in Chicago." His wife regularly made appearances in support of his candidacy. Hunter made a concerted effort to win support from African American voters. As part of this effort, he frequently visited African American church congregations for Sunday services.

Hunter also railed against school textbooks in Chicago, accusing Democrats of indoctrinating students through a school curriculum that he claimed provided "a diet of socialism, communism, Marxian doctrines, and Fair Deal politics for our children.

Hunter campaigned vigorously. Nevertheless, the election generated very little interest, contributing to its low turnout. Contributing to voter apathy may have been findings by the United States Senate Special Committee to Investigate Crime in Interstate Commerce that shined a negative light on the underworld of Chicago politics. Findings by this committee also harmed Kennelly, as he was perceived by the electorate to have done little to stamp out organized crime in the city. However, Hunter also failed to demonstrate to voters ability on his part to solve the crime issue in the city, and refused to take any strong stance against elements of the Republican party that were allied with gangsters Kennelly had, by 1951, seen a loss of support among African American electorate that had strongly supported him four years earlier.

Kennelly sought to avoid discussing major issues during the campaign, such as controversial matters related to the management of the Chicago Housing Authority.

=== Results ===
Kennelly outperformed Hunter in 34 wards. Hunter outperformed Kenelly in sixteen wards (more than double the number of wards that Kennelly had trailed the Republican nominee in four years earlier).

Mayor of Chicago 1951 election
Party	Candidate	Votes	%
Democratic	Martin H. Kennelly (incumbent)	697,871	56.14
Republican	Robert L. Hunter	545,326	43.87
Turnout		1,243,197	
