= Stanley Center for Peace and Security =

American nonprofit organization, 1956-

- Formation: 1956
- Founder: C. Maxwell and Elizabeth M. Stanley
- Type: Non-Governmental Organization
- Legal status: Private Operating Foundation
- Location: Muscatine, Iowa
- Chair: Brian Hanson
- President: Keith Porter
- Website: stanleycenter.org
- Formerly called: The Stanley Foundation

The Stanley Center for Peace and Security (formerly The Stanley Foundation) is a nonprofit, nonpartisan, private operating foundation seeking to address "global challenges that present a profound threat to human survival and well-being," namely mitigating climate change, avoiding the use of nuclear weapons, and preventing mass violence and atrocities. The center's mission is to "catalyze just and sustainable solutions to critical issues of peace and security by driving policy progress, advancing effective global governance, and advocating for collective action." The organization was founded in 1956 by C. Maxwell and Elizabeth M. Stanley and is headquartered in Muscatine, IA.

The foundation is within the Partner Circle of the Foundations Platform F20, an international network of foundations and other philanthropic organizations.

== Description ==
Originally established as a conduit for charitable giving, the center became more mission-focused and dedicated to research, education in international relations, and promotion of multilateral policy solutions through the United Nations. Following Max Stanley's death in 1984, Richard H. Stanley became chair of the center, a position he held until shortly before his death in 2017. From 2007 to January 2013, Vladimir P. Sambaiew served as the foundation's president, capping a distinguished 30-year career as a Foreign Service Officer in the US Department of State. After his retirement he was replaced on January 11, 2013 by Keith Porter, who had been with the Stanley Foundation for 24 years prior to his election. Brian Hanson, a great-nephew of Max and Elizabeth Stanley, now serves as chair.

In addition to a diverse series of cross-sector policy dialogues, commissioned analyses, and programs for journalists, the Stanley Center has historically been recognized for its media. From 1974 to 2004, the center published the influential international news magazine World Press Review. Common Ground, an award-winning weekly radio program on world affairs, ran from 1980 to 2004. The center publishes the tri-annual magazine Courier.
