= George Ojemann =

American neurosurgeon

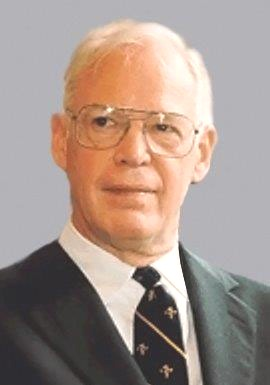
George Ojemann in 2000

George Ojemann is a professor emeritus of neurologic surgery in the Department of Neurological Surgery at the University of Washington School of Medicine.

== Biography ==
Ojemann was born in 1935, in Iowa City, and grew up there. He received a B.A. in 1956 from the University of Iowa, having served in the Air Force wing of the ROTC and being elected to Phi Beta Kappa. He was awarded the University's Brigg's award on graduation for having the highest cumulative GPA for the four undergraduate years.

== Medical career ==
To begin Dr. Ojemann received a M.D. in 1959, from the University of Iowa. During that time, he had developed an interest in neurology, under the guidance of Dr. Adolph Sahs, best known for his work in the natural history of subarachnoid hemorrhage from aneurysms. During his medical school years, he had completed a rotation in neurosurgery as Massachusetts General Hospital. He received the MacEwen prize for top academic performance throughout medical school and was elected AOA president his junior year. He studied neurosurgery at King County Hospital (now Harborview Medical Center) and the University of Washington, and took further training at the National Institutes of Health.

Ojemann's work the Society of Neurological surgeons awarded him a prize for "Outstanding Continuous Commitment to Research in the Neurosciences by a Neurological Surgeon" (1984), the National Institute of Neurological Diseases and Stroke a Javits Neuroscience Award (1984), the Medical College of Ohio an honorary Doctor of Science degree (1998), the K.J. Zulch Prize of the Maz-Planck Society for Basic Neurological Research (2000), the Cloward Medal of the Western Neurosurgical Society (2003), and he received Distinguished Alumni Awards from the University of Iowa (1991) and the University of Washington Medical School (2014). He is a past Director of the American Board of Neurological Surgery (1987-1993, chairman 1992-3), a member of the Residency Review Committee for Neurosurgery (1993–97), and President of the American Academy of Neurological Surgery in 1999-2000. He was a member of the Advisory Committee of the National Institute of Neurological Diseases and Stroke (1997-2000) and that institute's Board of Scientific Counselors (1985–89). He Also, served as a military surgeon for the United States Public Health Service from 1964 to 1966 where he then returned to Seattle in 1966, he has been affiliated with the neurosurgical faculty at UW since that time. He was board certified in 1967 by the American Board of Neurological Surgery. He is now married to Dr. Linda Moretti, a neurologist with shared interests in the treatment of epilepsy. They have three children, all physicians: two neurological surgeons.

In 2006, he retired from clinical practice but continued his research and teaching. In the 1980’s, this research had resulted in the development of the electrical stimulation mapping technique subsequently widely used to identify crucial language cortex in individual patients. For that in 2016, he was the Honored Guest at the First International Electrical Stimulation Mapping Course at the annual AANS meeting. From the 1990s on, the focus of this research, was on single neuron recordings from temporal cortex during language and recent memory. This continued until 2014 when he "fully" retired, an occasion marked by a Department sponsored symposium with presentations by his former colleagues and trainees. In 2014, he also received the University of Washington (UW) Distinguished Alumni Award.

== Research ==
He is the author of over 300 research papers and chapters most on the surgical treatment of epilepsy or the neurobiology of human cognition, and several books on the brain for the general public.

== Publications ==
He is the co-author of two books with William H. Calvin, Ph.D.: Inside the Brain was published in September 1980, and Conversations with Neil's Brain: the Neural Nature of Thought and Language in April 1995. He has co-authored Fundamental Mechanisms of Human Brain Function 1987 and Epilepsy Surgery 1993.
