= Charles F. Lynch =

American epidemiologist

- Other name: Chuck
- Occupations: Professor; Research Director; Anatomic Pathologist

Academic background
- Education: Loras College (BS Chemistry 1974); U Iowa (MS 1979); U Iowa (MD 1979); U Iowa (PhD 1983)

Academic work
- Discipline: Epidemiologist
- Sub-discipline: cancer and environmental

Charles F. Lynch is a cancer researcher, whose work has been cited 30,000 times. He is a university professor at the University of Iowa (full professor since 1998). He is director of two large multi-decade studies.

== Background and education ==
Lynch received his M.D. degree in 1979 and his Ph.D. degree in epidemiology in 1984, both from the University of Iowa. He did his residency in anatomical pathology 1982–1986. Dr. Lynch's primary research interests include the pathology of cancer, cancer epidemiology, radon, and environmental epidemiology.

== Iowa Cancer Registry ==
Lynch is the principal investigator of the Iowa Cancer Registry, a statewide cancer surveillance program that is part of the National Cancer Institute's Surveillance, Epidemiology, and End Results (SEER) Program. The registry, employing fifty, tracks every case of cancer and its survivors in each Iowa county since 1973. Since before 2003, Lynch managed the program.

== Prospective cohort studies ==
Currently, he is principal investigator for Iowa on the NCI/EPA/NIEHS-funded Agricultural Health Study (AHS), a prospective cohort study of 90,000 commercial pesticide applicators, private pesticide applicators, or spouses of private applicators from the states of Iowa or North Carolina. He is a co-director of the AHS Coordinating Center.

== Selected publications ==
- An Update of Cancer Incidence in the Agricultural Health Study (2010)
- Human papillomavirus and rising oropharyngeal cancer incidence in the United States (2011)
- Home Radon Testing (video)
