= Richard J. Schnieders =

- Education: University of Iowa
- Occupations: Former Chairman, President, and CEO of Sysco
- Spouse: Beth Schnieders
- Children: 2

Richard J. Schnieders is an American businessman who is the former chairman, president, and chief executive officer of Sysco.

== Early life and education ==
Rick Schnieders grew up in Remsen, Iowa, where his family owned a grocery store. He earned a Bachelor of Arts in mathematics from the University of Iowa in 1970.

== Career ==
Schnieders began his career in the meat department of a regional grocery store, before moving on to sell meat for a national company, and later serving as the general sales manager for a foodservice distributor. He began working for Sysco in 1982, joining an executive management program at the company's Memphis subsidiary. He served in various divisions in managerial positions from 1988 until January 2000, when he became chief operating officer of the entire company. In July 2000, he added the role of president. He left both positions in December 2002, to become chairman and chief executive officer in January 2003, but resumed the presidency for a two-year period from July 2005 to July 2007.

Schnieders announced his retirement on January 20, 2009, effective June 27, 2009; he continued to chair the board of directors until that date. At the same time, he stated his intention to serve as CEO until March 31, 2009, when Bill DeLaney, the company's executive vice president and chief financial officer, would assume that role.

After his retirement from Sysco, Schnieders and his wife, Beth, moved to Santa Fe, where they founded MoGro, a mobile grocery store that serves Native American communities in New Mexico. As of 2022, the company operates as a nonprofit. Schnieders also serves on the board of Revolution Foods, and holds community board positions at Save the Children and Stone Barns.

== Compensation ==
While CEO of Sysco in 2008, Schnieders earned a total compensation of $9,278,486, which included a base salary of $1,146,500, a cash bonus of $7,048,400, and options granted of $942,200.

== Awards ==
Schnieders was named Hospitality Executive of the Year by the Penn State Hotel and Restaurant Society in 2006, and inducted into the Penn State Hospitality Hall of Fame.

In 2008, he received a Distinguished Alumni Award from the University of Iowa.
