= David Cantine =

Canadian painter

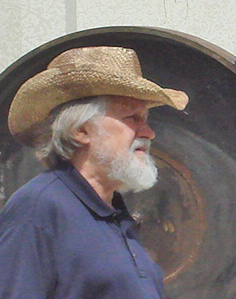
- Cantine at an exhibition of Peter Hide's sculptures outside the Royal Alberta Museum, June 2008.
- Born: 1939 (age 86–87); Jackson, Michigan, USA
- Education: University of Iowa
- Known for: Painting; Drawing
- Notable work: Light Primary Still Life
- Movement: post-modernism
- Spouse: Karen Cantine

David Cantine (born 1939) is a Canadian painter, best known for consistently painting pictures using the same composition for the last forty years of his career. Cantine was born in Jackson, Michigan, and went to school at the University of Iowa, earning a Bachelor of Arts degree in 1962, and a Master of Arts degree in 1964. In 1965 he began teaching drawing and painting at the University of Alberta, until retiring from his position in 1996.

Cantine began to experiment with abstraction in the 1970s, including minimalist, post-painterly abstraction.
