= Tappy Phillips =

American journalist

Tappy Phillips (born Thomasia Anne Phillips; February 5, 1948) is a retired American news correspondent for ABC News and was a Consumer Affairs reporter for WABC-TV in New York from 1996 to 2009. Phillips joined WABC-TV's Eyewitness News in 1985. Phillips won an Emmy Award for her coverage of the Bensonhurst trial verdict, a Long Island Folio Award, and a New York State Broadcasters Award for her report on Plum Island, among others.

Phillips graduated from the University of Iowa with a BA in mass communications and philosophy and reported for The Daily Iowan while attending school. She reported for Cleveland's WEWS-TV in 1978 and WKYC in 1980.

During her career Phillips has exposed concerts related to Ticketmaster's monopoly, an 80 year old woman who would not receive dentures, Burger King and other fast food chains menu price anchoring, advance-fee scam's, exploitative talent agencies, cleared up a stalled worker's compensation case and got a disabled bus driver a needed back operation and a right to work.

Phillips followed a doctor from Bensonhurst, New York who has refused to give his patients their mammograms. For over eleven months, Phillips and WABC has continued to investigate the culprit, Dr. Florentine and his brother. On July 23, it was reported that the doctors were arrested, all without returning the mammograms to the women.

In addition to her reporting for Eyewitness News, Phillips is also a freelance photographer with work published in the New York Times and Esquire.

In 2007 Phillips was nominated for a New York Emmy Award in Journalistic Enterprise.

On the November 20, 2009 5PM newscast of Eyewitness News, it was announced that Phillips would retire. A segment honoring her was aired on the newscast. She moved to Delaware after retiring and practiced golfing.
