= C. Maxwell Stanley =

- Born: 1904; Corning, Iowa, US
- Died: 1984 (aged 79–80); New York City, US
- Education: University of Iowa: 1926 B.S., engineering; 1930 M.S., hydraulic engineering
- Spouse: Elizabeth
- Children: 3
- Engineering career
- Discipline: civil engineering, engineering consulting
- Institutions: Stanley Consultants
- Projects: Waging Peace : A Businessman Looks at United States Foreign Policy, The Consulting Engineer, A guide to survival: Managing global problems

Claude Maxwell Stanley (1904–1984) was an American civil engineer, entrepreneur, philanthropist, peace activist, author and world citizen. He founded Stanley Consultants, an engineering and consulting firm, in 1939 with his younger brother Art. In 1943 he co-founded HON Industries, originally named Home-O-Nize, an office furniture manufacturing company; and, along with his wife Elizabeth, created and endowed the Stanley Foundation (now the Stanley Center for Peace and Security) in 1956, which is a global policy organization which focuses on mitigating climate change, avoiding the use of nuclear weapons, and preventing mass violence and atrocities. All three organizations are headquartered in Muscatine, Iowa, United States.

== Background ==
Mr. Stanley provided leadership in a number of engineering societies. He was a Fellow of the American Society of Civil Engineers, the Institute of Electrical and Electronics Engineers, the American Society of Mechanical Engineers, and the American Consulting Engineers Council. He was a member of the National Society of Professional Engineers, the Iowa Engineering Society (Honorary Member and Past President), the Illinois Society of Professional Engineers, and the Consulting Engineers Council/Iowa. He was the first Chairman of the UI Foundation's President's Club and was a member of the Foundation Board for nine years, including four as Chairman. He was one of the College of Engineering's most outstanding graduates and extensively supported The University of Iowa, including the donation of over $2 million and a major art collection to the UI Foundation after his death in 1984.

Mr. Stanley died from a heart attack while on a business trip to New York City.

In 2003, the Hydraulics Laboratory of the University of Iowa was renamed in honor of 1926 engineering graduate C. Maxwell Stanley. The structure is home to the College of Engineering's IIHR—Hydroscience & Engineering.
