= Bruce Haynam =

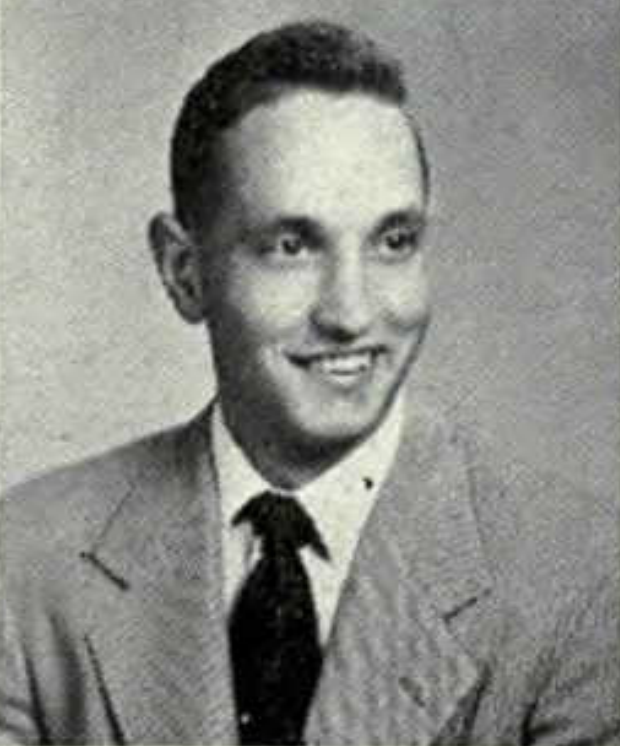
- Shortstop
- Born: February 26, 1931; Ohio
- Died: February 22, 2015 (aged 83)

Teams
- Michigan Wolverines (1951–1953)

Bruce E. Haynam (February 26, 1931 – February 22, 2015) was an American baseball player. He was the captain of the 1952 Michigan Wolverines baseball team. In 1953, he helped lead the team to the school's first College World Series championship and was the only player on the team to be selected as a first-team All-American. He was inducted in the University of Michigan Athletic Hall of Honor in 1988.

== Early years ==
Haynam was raised in Cleveland Heights, Ohio and attended University High School. He was a star baseball player in high school, playing as a second baseman.

== University of Michigan ==
After graduating from high school, Haynam enrolled at the University of Michigan in 1950 as a student in the School of Engineering. While attending Michigan, Haynam played baseball for the Michigan Wolverines baseball team from 1951 to 1953. He was the captain of the 1952 team. He broke a Big Ten Conference record in 1952 by hitting five sacrifices.

In 1953, Haynam was the starting shortstop for the 1953 Michigan baseball team that won the College World Series for the first time in the school's history. Michigan's 1953 infield consisting of Haynam, Don Eaddy, Bill Mogk, and Gil Sabuco was sometimes referred to as the "million-dollar infield." At the end of the season, Haynam was selected by the American Baseball Coaches Association as the shortstop on the 1953 College Baseball All-America Team He was the first Michigan player to be selected as an All-American.

While attending Michigan, Haynam was a member of Michigamua (the all campus senior honorary society), Phi Gamma Delta fraternity and the Vulcans (the Engineering School's senior honorary society). He graduated from Michigan in 1954 with a bachelor of science degree in mechanical engineering.

In October 1956, longtime Michigan baseball coach Ray Fisher named Haynam as the shortstop on his all-time Michigan baseball team. Haynam was inducted in the University of Michigan Athletic Hall of Honor in 1988. He joined Bill Freehan (inducted 1979), George Sisler (inducted 1979), Buck Giles (inducted 1980), Bud Chamberlain (inducted 1982), and Dick Wakefield (inducted 1983), as Michigan baseball players in the Hall of Honor. Bill Mogk, Haynam's partner in the 1953 "million dollar infield," was inducted in 2002.

== Later years ==
After graduating from Michigan, Haynam opted not to pursue a career in professional baseball. Instead, he returned to Ohio to commence his professional career as an engineer.

Haynam married Barbara White. They had three children: Maribeth, Anne, and Leigh.

Haynam served for a time as a member of the Kinsman Township Zoning Board of Appeals, but resigned the position in order to fulfill his business responsibilities.

== See also ==
- University of Michigan Athletic Hall of Honor
