= Bill Mogk =

American baseball player (1931–2021)

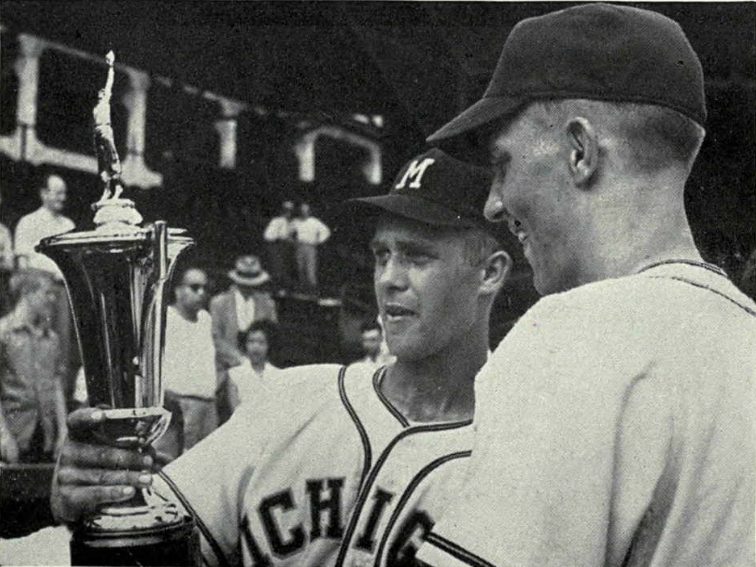
- First baseman
- Born: November 7, 1931; Detroit, Michigan U.S.
- Died: April 17, 2021 (aged 89)

Teams
- Michigan Wolverines (1951–1953)

William C. Mogk (November 7, 1931 – April 17, 2021) was an American baseball player. He was the captain of the 1953 Michigan Wolverines baseball team that won the school's first College World Series championship. He was inducted in the University of Michigan Athletic Hall of Honor in 2002.

== University of Michigan ==
Mogk enrolled at the University of Michigan in 1950. While attending Michigan, Mogk played baseball for the Michigan Wolverines baseball team from 1950 to 1953 and earned varsity letters in 1951, 1952, and 1953. He was a second baseman as a sophomore in 1951 but moved to first base for his junior and senior years. During the 1952 season, Mogk was perfect on defense, going the entire year (his first at first base) without an error. He was "the first Wolverine to play errorless for an entire season." In December 1952, Mogk was elected by his teammates as the captain for the 1953 team. The 1953 team won the College World Series for the first time in the school's history. Michigan's 1953 infield consisting of Mogk, Bruce Haynam, Don Eaddy, and Gil Sabuco was sometimes referred to as the "million-dollar infield."

While attending Michigan, Mogk was a member of Phi Delta Theta fraternity. He graduated from Michigan in 1954 with a bachelor of arts degree in history.

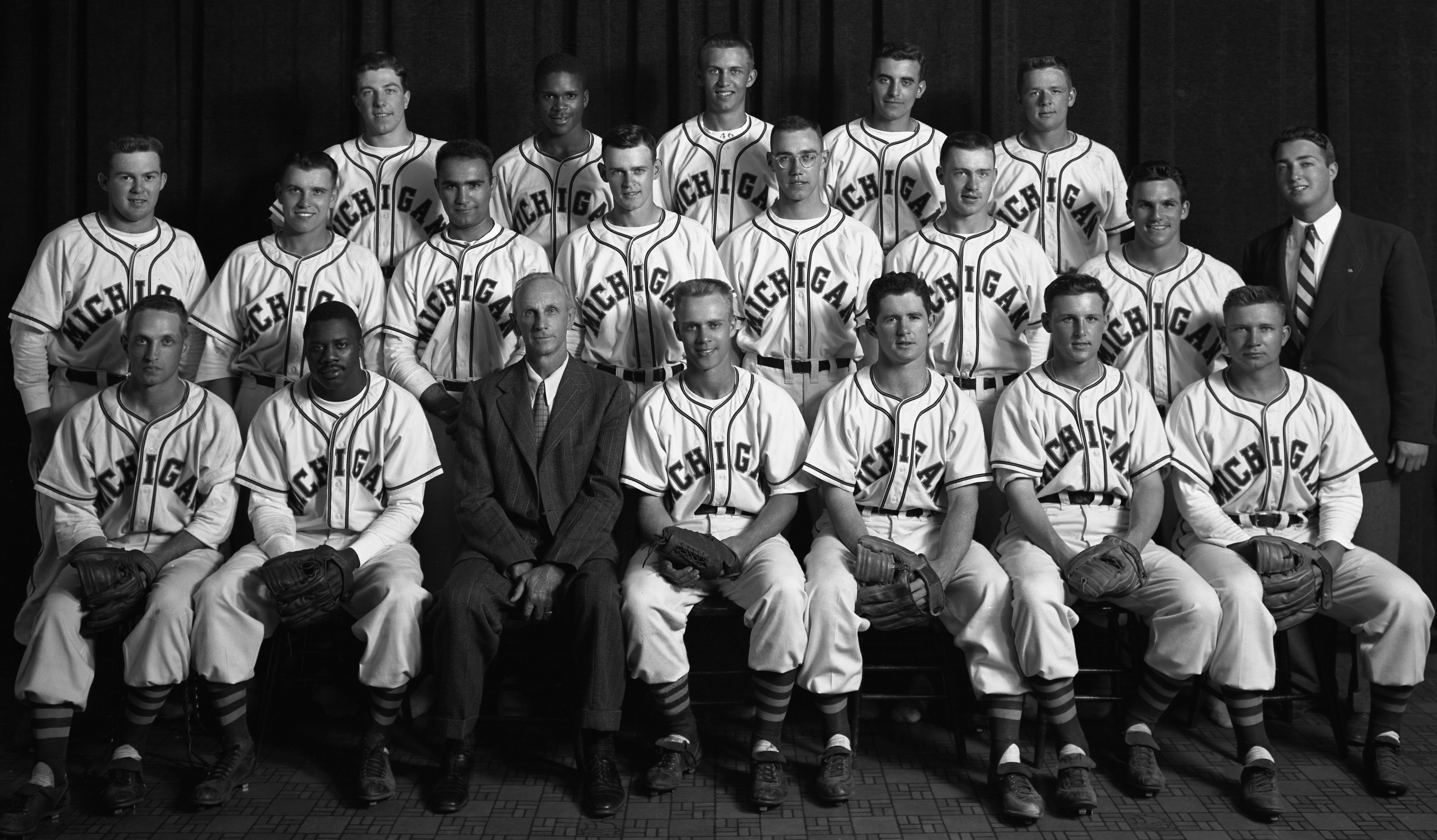
1953 Michigan baseball team; Mogk in front row center to the right of coach Ray Fisher

Mogk was inducted in the University of Michigan Athletic Hall of Honor in 2002. He joined Bill Freehan (inducted 1979), George Sisler (inducted 1979), Buck Giles (inducted 1980), Bud Chamberlain (inducted 1982), and Dick Wakefield (inducted 1983), as Michigan baseball players in the Hall of Honor. Bruce Haynam, Mogk's partner in the 1953 "million dollar infield," was inducted in 1988.

== Later years ==
After graduating from Michigan, Mogk became a school teacher and administrator in the Grosse Pointe schools in suburban Detroit. He also served as the principal and baseball coach at Grosse Pointe South High School.

Mogk died on April 17, 2021, at the age of 89.

== See also ==
- University of Michigan Athletic Hall of Honor
