= Harold O'Neill (disambiguation) =

Harold O'Neill may refer to:

- Harold O'Neill (1928–1983), member of the South Australian House of Assembly
- Harold O'Neill (footballer), see 1935–36 French Division 1
- Harold O'Neill (footballer, born 1894)

== See also ==
- Harold O'Neil, professor
- Harry O'Neill (disambiguation)
- Harold O'Neal, musician
