= Ruth Pickett Thompson =

American synchronized swimmer

Personal information
- Born: Richmond, Virginia, United States

Sport
- Sport: Synchronised swimming

Ruth Pickett Thompson is a former All-American synchronized swimmer for the University of Michigan. A native of Richmond, Virginia, she was named an All-American in four consecutive years from 1978 to 1981, and also placed among the top three individuals at the Intercollegiate Synchronized Swimming Championships in each of those years. Synchronized swimming was one of the six original varsity sports for women. Under the coaching of Joyce Lindeman, the varsity team finished second in the Association of Intercollegiate Athletics for Women tournament in 1977 and 1978.

Thompson was the leader of the 1977 and 1978 squads, and was honored with the Association for Intercollegiate Athletics for Women's 1979 and 1980 Broderick Awards as the nation's top collegiate athlete in her sport. She also received the 1981 Marie Hartwig Award winner as the University of Michigan's female athlete of the year. In 1998, she received the Gerald R. Ford Award, presented each year to a single former student-athlete who epitomizes excellence in scholarship, sport and society.

In February 2008, she was inducted into the University of Michigan Athletic Hall of Honor along with Heisman Trophy winner Desmond Howard. In February 2008, Thompson said the Ford Award and the induction into the Hall of Honor rank at the top of her top achievements. "I was quite surprised when I got the phone call, so I was very thrilled and honored to be recognized by the university and athletic department," she said.

Her two sons, both students at the University of Michigan, attended the Hall of Honor induction ceremonies. She noted at the time: "My children and husband were thrilled about this award because Desmond Howard was being inducted with me, so this one is a lot cooler" than other honors. Thompson remains involved with synchronized swimming, swimming with U-M's masters group, which takes part in the national competition every year. She currently lives in the St. Clair County, Michigan, works as a substitute teacher and volunteers in school, community and church organizations.

Since 2001, the University of Michigan Synchronized Swimming Team has presented the Ruth Pickett Thompson Athlete of the Year Award to the athlete who has demonstrated superior work ethic, dedication to the team, and the potential to achieve greatness. Past recipients include Rochelle Ross and Sarah DuBay.
