= Harry O'Neill =

Harry O'Neill may refer to:

- Harry P. O'Neill (1889–1953), U.S. Representative from Pennsylvania
- Harry O'Neill (One Life to Live), a character from the soap opera One Life to Live
- Harry O'Neill (pitcher) (1892–1969), Major League Baseball pitcher, 1922–1923
- Harry O'Neill (catcher) (1917–1945), Major League Baseball player killed in World War II
- Harry O'Neill (footballer, born 1894), English footballer for The Wednesday, Bristol Rovers and Swindon Town
- Harry O'Neill (footballer, born 1908), English footballer for Cardiff City

== See also ==
- Henry O'Neill (disambiguation)
- Harold O'Neill (disambiguation)
