= Ben Smith (golfer) =

American golfer

- Benjamin Sandipher Smith
- Born: March 16, 1921; Fort Myers, Florida, U.S.
- Died: July 21, 2009 (aged 88); Naples, Florida, U.S.
- Education: University of Michigan in Ann Arbor, University of Michigan, University of Michigan Athletic Hall of Honor
- Occupation: American golfer

Benjamin Sandipher Smith (March 16, 1921 – July 21, 2009) was an American golfer.

Smith was born in Fort Myers, Florida. In 1938 and 1939 he won the Florida State High School Championship, and was offered a golf scholarship to go to Tulane University, but by chance he met Thomas Trueblood, the golf coach at University of Michigan in Ann Arbor, and he invited Smith to come to University of Michigan and live as his houseboy. He moved to Ann Arbor in 1939, and in his four years at the University of Michigan he finished 3rd, 2nd, and 1st in the Big Ten Championship.

In 1950, he won the Michigan Amateur at Gull Lake. He also won the GAM Championship five times and qualified for six USGA Championships.

In 1943, Smith was the president of the National Intercollegiate Golf Association and worked with Chick Evans in his caddy scholarship program.

After he graduated from Michigan, Smith served three and a half years in the US Navy, and then returned to Detroit. He joined Fife Electric Supply Company in 1946 and became the owner in 1973. He was also the president of the National Association of Electrical Distributors in 1975–1976.

In 1985, Ben was inducted into the University of Michigan Athletic Hall of Honor. In 1990, he was inducted into the Michigan Golf Hall of Fame. Finally, In 1995, he was inducted into the inaugural Fort Myers High School Green Wave Golf Hall of Fame.

On July 21, 2009, Smith died at the age of 88 in the Naples Community Hospital in Naples, Florida.
