= Kraker =

Kraker or Kräker is a Dutch and German surname. It may originate from Dutch kraken, meaning to make noise, or from German kraken (to whine, to complain). It may also be an occupational name for a hangman, derived from Middle Dutch craghe, meaning neck. The surname may refer to

- Francie Kraker Goodridge (born 1947), American track and field athlete and coach
- Mehryn Kraker (born 1994), American basketball player
- Steffi Kräker (born 1960), German psychologist and retired gymnast
