= William Murphy (tennis) =

American tennis player and coach

William E. "Bill" Murphy
- Born: November 15, 1917; Chicago, Illinois, United States
- Died: May 16, 2005 (aged 87); Tucson, Arizona
- Education: University of Chicago, BA, George Williams College, MA
- Alma mater: University of Chicago
- Occupation: Tennis coach
- Years active: 1948–69
- Known for: Big Ten doubles tennis champion, 1938, 1939; Coached University of Michigan to NCAA team tennis championship, 1957

William E. Murphy (November 15, 1917 – May 16, 2005) was a Navy Cross winner in World War II, an American Championship tennis player and university coach.

== Early life ==
In 1941, he earned a master's degree in Physical Education from George Williams College in Chicago. In World War II as a dive bomber pilot in the Pacific, landing a bomb that helped sink the world's largest Japanese battleship Yamato, earning Navy Cross.

== Career ==
In 1948, he became the coach of the University of Michigan tennis team, where he remained for 21 years until 1969. He led Michigan to Eleven Big Ten Team Championships and the NCAA Team Championship in 1957. In 1970, he became the tennis coach at the University of Arizona until retiring in 1981. He remained in Tucson and died in 2005 at age 87. His wife, Mimi, died in June 2011. Chet died in 2016.

== Player ==
A native of Chicago, Illinois, Murphy and twin brother, Chet, played for the University of Chicago from 1937 to 1939. They led the school to three Big Ten Conference Tennis Championships. As a doubles team, they were undefeated in collegiate meets, including wins at the Big Ten Conference Doubles Championships in 1938 and 1939. They were the Finalist team at the 1939 NCAA Doubles Championship.

In 1938, the Murphy brothers helped their undefeated team score the first clean sweep in the history of the Big Ten Conference Tennis Championships by winning all nine finals matches. The brothers won the doubles title over the Northwestern team, 5–7, 6–4, 7–5. John Shostrom won the No. 1 singles and the Murphy brothers won No. 2 and No. 3 singles. Bill beat Northwestern's Harry O'Neil, 6–0, 6–3. At the National level, the Murphy brothers were ranked as the #10 Doubles pair by the United States Lawn Tennis Association in 1938.

In May 1939, the brothers led the university to its third straight Big Ten Conference Tennis Championship. The Associated Press wrote, "The University of Chicago, where the athletic habit of recent years has leaned toward defeat, now has a new complex well established – tennis championships." The Murphy brothers won their second consecutive Doubles Championship, and Chet won the No. 1 singles. Bill qualified to play for the No. 2 Singles title, but defaulted to save himself for the doubles competition. In June 1939, the brothers were runners up in the NCAA Doubles Championship to Bob Peacock and Doug Imhoff, of the University of California-Berkeley, and Chet was runner up in the NCAA Singles Championship to Frank Guernsey of Rice University.

In July 1939, Murphy won the singles title at the Western Tennis Association tournament in Chicago. The Associated Press reported that he won his Championship "the hard way," defeating top-ranked Wilbur F. Coen, Jr., a.k.a. Junior Coen, of Kansas City in the semifinals, and then defeated #2 seeded Jack Tidball of Los Angeles, 6–8, 6–1, 6–1, 9–7 in the finals. The following week, he won the mixed doubles at the Longwood Cricket Club tennis tournament in Brookline, Massachusetts with Mary Arnold.

In August 1939, at the Meadow Club Invitation tournament in Southampton, New York, the brothers beat the team of Peacock and Imhoff, but lost a close doubles match against Wimbledon champions Bobby Riggs and Elwood Cooke. They won two of the first three sets but ultimately lost, 13–11, 3–6, 7–5, 4–6, 0–6. At Seabright, they beat Riggs and Bitsy Grant.

== Coach ==
Murphy was the tennis coach at the University of Michigan for 21 years from 1948 to 1969. His Michigan tennis teams won 11 Big Ten Conference Championships and the NCAA Team Championship in 1957. His career coaching record at Michigan was 198–45–0, an .821 winning percentage. In 1953, he recruited three outstanding junior players: Mark Jaffe, Barry MacKay (tennis) and Dick Potter. They formed the core of his teams for three years. MacKay and Potter broke the Big Ten record held by Bill and Chet for most Big Ten Conference Doubles Championships with three. MacKay and Potter won the Big Ten Conference Doubles Championships in 1955, 1956, and 1957.

In 1970, Bill was hired by Dave Strack, Athletic Director at University of Arizona and former basketball coach at Michigan, as the tennis coach. He retired there in 1981, and lived in Tucson until his death in 2005 at age 87.

Coaching record at Michigan:

Year	Team	Overall	Conference	Standing	Bowl/playoffs	Rank^{#}
University of Michigan (Big Ten Conference) (1948–1969)
1948–49	Michigan	8–0		2nd		
1949–50	Michigan	9–0		3rd		
1950–51	Michigan	6–2		2nd		
1951–52	Michigan	6–4		5th		
1952–53	Michigan	8–3		3rd		
1953–54	Michigan	11–3–1		2nd		
1954–55	Michigan	13–0		1st		5th
1955–56	Michigan	12–0		1st		
1956–57	Michigan	12–0		1st		1st
1957–58	Michigan	8–2		3rd		
1958–59	Michigan	9–1		1st		
1959–60	Michigan	7–4		1st		
1960–61	Michigan	9–3		1st		
1961–62	Michigan	8–2		1st		
1962–63	Michigan	7–6		2nd		
1963–64	Michigan	9–4		2nd		
1964–65	Michigan	10–4		1st		
1965–66	Michigan	10–0		1st		
1966–67	Michigan	9–3		2nd		
1967–68	Michigan	13–0		1st		
1968–69	Michigan	15–2		1st		
Total:		198–45–0				
National championship Conference title Conference division title or championship game berth
^{†}Indicates Bowl Coalition, Bowl Alliance, BCS, or CFP / New Years' Six bowl.; ^{#}Rankings from final Coaches Poll.

== Author ==
Bill Murphy wrote books about tennis together with Chet. They wrote Tennis Handbook, published in 1962, Championship Drills, Advanced Tennis, Tennis for Thinking Players, and Tested Tennis Tips. The two were recognized for their books with an International Tennis Hall of Fame Educational Services Award in 1973.

== Recognition ==
- Intercollegiate Tennis Association Hall of Fame in 1984 (Chet followed in 1985).
- University of Michigan Athletic Hall of Honor (1983)
- Joint inductiong into the University of Chicago Athletics Hall of Fame (2003).
- Member of the USPTA
- President and Chairmen of the National Collegiate Tennis Coaches Association and National Collegiate Tennis Committee (1965 and 1966)
- Navy Cross for 72 combat missions in the Pacific and sinking Yamato Battleship
- Distinguished Flying Cross
- Four Air Medals during War
- Helped sink the Japanese Battleship Yamato, largest in the world

== See also ==
- University of Michigan Athletic Hall of Honor in 1983
- Barry MacKay (tennis), Michigan's star player on Murphy's teams from 1955 to 1957
