= Brian Eisner =

American tennis player and coach (1940–2025)

Biographical details
- Born: July 24, 1940
- Died: September 10, 2025 (aged 85)

Playing career
- early 1960s: Michigan State

Coaching career (HC unless noted)
- 1963–1969: Toledo
- 1969–1999: Michigan

Head coaching record
- Overall: 525–231–1

Accomplishments and honors

Championships
- 4 MAC; 18 Big Ten

Brian Eisner (July 24, 1940 – September 10, 2025) was an American tennis player and coach. He played collegiate tennis at Michigan State University from 1960 to 1962. From 1963 to 1969, he was the head tennis coach at the University of Toledo. During his 30 years as the head coach of the men's tennis team at the University of Michigan, he led the team to 18 Big Ten Conference Championships, including 16 in a row. He is the winningest tennis coach in University of Michigan history and has been inducted into the Athletic Halls of Fame at Michigan, Toledo, and the Intercollegiate Tennis Association.

== Early years ==
A native of Manitowoc, Wisconsin, Eisner played collegiate tennis for Michigan State University. He was the runner-up for the Big Ten Conference singles championship in 1960 and was selected as the captain of the Michigan State Spartans tennis team in 1961 and 1962.

== University of Toledo ==
In September 1963, Eisner was named the head coach of the men's tennis team at the University of Toledo. He served in that position until 1969, leading Toledo to four consecutive Mid-American Conference championships from 1966 to 1969 and compiling a record of 76–30–1. Eisner's younger brother, Dean Eisner, was the No. 1 singles player for the Toledo Rockets in 1966.

== University of Michigan ==
In September 1969, Eisner was hired as the head coach of the Michigan Wolverines men's tennis team. Upon arriving in Ann Arbor, Eisner began lobbying to enhance the university's tennis facilities and recruiting the nation's top tennis players and had success with players like Peter Fleming, Victor Amaya, and Freddy de Jesús.

Eisner served as Michigan's head tennis coach from 1969 to 1999, compiling a record of 449–201 in dual meets and leading the Wolverines to 18 Big Ten Conference tennis championships, including 16 consecutive conference championships from 1970 to 1982. In 1985, columnist Phil Nussel wrote in The Michigan Daily:

"There is no doubt in my mind that the top active coach at Michigan today is men's tennis coach Brian Eisner. That's a tough proclamation to make with the likes of Bo Schembechler, Bud Middaugh, and Bill Frieder on hand. But then again, none of these coaches can claim to have won 14 straight Big Ten titles. Eisner took his Wolverine squads to the Big Ten championship from 1970-1983. After that, he took these teams to the NCAA tournament -- all 14 years."

Eisner's Michigan teams finished in the top ten nationally six times. He also coached Mike Leach to the NCAA singles championship in 1982. In 1976, Sports Illustrated published a feature story about Eisner's success in building the Michigan tennis program into a national powerhouse despite playing in the frigid upper Midwest. The reporter compared Eisner's success at Michigan to an ice hockey team from Brazil taking on the Russians. Eisner modestly told the Sports Illustrated reporter, "I have everything going against me: weather, facilities, money. How can I possibly compete with USC, Stanford, and UCLA?" Eisner then answered, "Coaching." The article continued:

"Eisner's confidence and powers of persuasion are commanding. His aim, when talking to his parents, is to turn every promise of fun in the sun made by his Sunbelt rivals into a threat. He is high on the strong academic tradition at Michigan and actually sings The Victors when high school seniors visit the campus on football Saturdays. . . . This puffery notwithstanding, Eisner's strongest selling point is his record. In the last three years, Michigan has finished fourth, third, and seventh in the NCAA championships. No other team outside the Sunshine States has finished as high as third in 10 years."

Eisner was also credited with being a key figure in the development of the Michigan Varsity Tennis Center. Eisner achieved his 500th career win as a coach in NCAA dual matches in 1998.

== Later life and death ==
After retiring as Michigan's tennis coach, Eisner became the owner of the Liberty Athletic Club in Ann Arbor. Several of his former athletes work as tennis professionals at the club including former Big Ten Player of the Year Peter Pusztai and NCAA singles finalist Dan Goldberg.

In 2000, he was inducted into the ITA Collegiate Hall of Fame and in January 2011, Eisner was inducted into the University of Michigan Athletic Hall of Honor. He was also inducted into the University of Toledo's Varsity "T" Hall of Fame in 1993.

Eisner died on September 10, 2025, at the age of 85.

== See also ==
- University of Michigan Athletic Hall of Honor
- ITA Collegiate Hall of Fame-Athens, GA
- University of Toledo Hall of Fame
