= Diane Ratnik =

Canadian volleyball player (born 1962)

Diane Ratnik-Cooper (born July 14, 1962, in Toronto, Ontario) is a retired volleyball player from Canada, who competed for her native country in two Summer Olympics: 1984 and 1996. A resident of Scarborough, Ontario, she finished in eighth and tenth place with the Women's National Team.

In January 2009, Diane was inducted into the University of Michigan Athletic Hall of Honor for her achievements on the 1981 Big Ten Championship volleyball team.

== See also ==
- University of Michigan Athletic Hall of Honor
