= Edward I. Schalon =

Corporate executive, amateur golfer

Edward Irvin Schalon
- Edward Schalon
- Born: February 27, 1920; St. Joseph, Michigan, U.S.
- Died: December 27, 2008 (aged 88); St. Joseph, Michigan, U.S.
- Education: University of Michigan
- Occupation: corporate executive
- Known for: Big Ten Conference individual golf champion, 1947, 1949; CEO and Chairman of the Board of Sealed Power Corp. University of Michigan Athletic Hall of Honor

Edward Irvin Schalon (February 27, 1920 – December 27, 2008) was an American corporate executive who served as the chairman of the board and chief executive officer of SPX Corporation, a Fortune 500 global company. He was also a Naval pilot in World War II and a champion golfer who won two Big Ten Conference individual championships while a student at the University of Michigan. He was also a benefactor of Grand Valley State University and has been inducted into the Grand Valley Hall of Fame, as well as the University of Michigan Athletic Hall of Honor.

== Early years ==
Schalon was the ninth of eleven children born to a German Lutheran family in St. Joseph, Michigan. Schalon began golfing at age 14 and became captain of the St. Joseph High School golf team. He was later inducted into the St. Joseph High School Athletic Hall of Fame.

After graduating from St. Joseph High School, Schalon worked for Industrial Rubber Co. When the United States entered World War II, Schalon enlisted in the U.S. Naval Air Corps, where he served as a carrier-based bomber escort pilot with squadron VC-65 in the Pacific Theater.

== University of Michigan ==
Schalon enrolled at the University of Michigan after his military service and was a member of the university’s golf team. He twice won the Big Ten Conference golf championship, in 1947 (at West Lafayette, Indiana) and again in 1949 (playing on the University of Michigan golf course). He graduated from the University of Michigan in 1950 with a B.S. in chemistry.

In 1982, Schalon was inducted into the University of Michigan Athletic Hall of Honor. He was also a member of the University of Michigan Victors Club and the Michigauma honor society.

== Business career ==
In 1950, Schalon joined Corduroy Rubber Co. of Grand Rapids, Michigan, as a sales engineer and chemist. In 1952, he joined Paramount Die Casting in St. Joseph, Michigan. In 1954, Schalon and four partners formed Consolidated Die Casting in Dowagiac, Michigan. Schalon was elected president of Consolidated Die Casting in 1965, and was the company's president when it was acquired in 1968 by Sealed Power Corp. (now known as SPX) of Muskegon, Michigan. In 1970, Schalon became group vice president of Sealed Powers' general products division. And in December 1973, he was elected president and chief executive officer of Sealed Power. At the time, Sealed Power was the world's largest producer of piston rings and a producer of cylinder sleeves and other precision engine parts for the automotive and other industries. He was president of Sealed Power during its "heyday" in the 1970s and 1980s, when it was a Fortune 500 company. He served as the company's chief executive officer until December 1983 and as its chairman of the board until his retirement in 1989.

== Grand Valley State University ==
Schalon was a founding member of the Grand Valley State University Foundation and a long-time benefactor of the western Michigan university. Schalon provided major support for Grand Valley’s Seymour and Esther Padnos College of Engineering and Computing. The Mr. and Mrs. Edward I. Schalon Plastics and Metal Forming Lab was named in honor of Schalon and his wife. Grand Valley President Thomas J. Haas called Schalon "one of the real titans in the history of Grand Valley State University." He was inducted into Grand Valley's Hall of Fame in 1984. He was also awarded an Honorary Doctor of Laws Degree from Grand Valley in 1985.

Schalon also supported Grand Valley’s Lake Michigan Center, which houses the Robert B. Annis Water Resources Institute in downtown Muskegon. He also sought to foster economic development in the Muskegon area as chairman of the "New Muskegon" economic recovery campaign in the 1980s. Upon Schalon's death, Grand Valley President Haas said: "Ed Schalon made a mark on Muskegon, and his family made a mark on Grand Valley. His leadership helped strengthen Grand Valley's regional perspective, and he was very supportive of our efforts in engineering and with the Lake Michigan Center in Muskegon."

Schalon was also a former trustee of the Michigan Colleges Foundation and the Citizen’s Research Council of Michigan.

== Family and death ==
Schalon married Marcella (Marcie) Gast in 1950. The two remained married for 58 years. Schalon died at his home in St. Joseph, Michigan in December 2008 after an extended illness. He was survived by his wife, his daughter, Susan Schalon, and his son, Scott Schalon.

== See also ==
- University of Michigan Athletic Hall of Honor
