= Bill Combs =

American wrestler (1918–1945)

Billy Burk Combs (August 22, 1918 – February 19, 1945) was an All-American collegiate wrestler at the University of Michigan (1939–41) who was killed in the invasion of Iwo Jima during World War II. A native of Tulsa, Oklahoma, Combs enrolled at the University of Michigan and competed for the Michigan wrestling teams coached by Oklahoma native Cliff Keen. He was elected captain of Michigan's 1941 wrestling team and president of the university's "M" Club of varsity lettermen. He placed second in the 145-pound class at the national AAU championship in March 1940, losing the championship match in overtime. In December 1940, he won the 155-pound championship at the Midwest AAU tournament at Chicago. He was also the 1941 Western Conference wrestling champion at 175 pounds.

He left school before graduating to join the United States Marine Corps during World War II, enlisting the day after the attack on Pearl Harbor. He was wounded in 1942 during the invasion of the Solomon Islands and was sent to a hospital in San Francisco to recuperate. According to an account published in newspapers across the United States, Combs was attacked by eight Japanese soldiers; he killed seven of them with his machine gun and, when the gun jammed, he disarmed the eighth Japanese soldier and "slit his throat" with a bayonet. Combs received a presidential citation and a Purple Heart for his service. After recovering from his wounds, Combs returned to action in the Pacific. He was killed during the invasion of Iwo Jima on February 19, 1945. In 1986, Combs was posthumously inducted into the University of Michigan Athletic Hall of Honor.

== See also ==
- University of Michigan Athletic Hall of Honor
