= Penny Neer =

American sportswoman (born 1960)

Personal information
- Full name: Penny Lou Neer
- Born: November 7, 1960 (age 65) Hillsdale, Michigan, U.S.
- Height: 6 ft 0 in (183 cm)
- Weight: 165 lb (75 kg)
Medal record
Women's athletics
Representing the United States
Pacific Conference Games
Gold medal – first place	1985 Berkeley	Discus throw
Pan American Games
Bronze medal – third place	1983 Caracas	Discus throw

Penny Lou Neer (born November 7, 1960) is a former American collegiate and Olympic athlete in discus throwing, basketball and softball.

A native of Hillsdale, Michigan, Neer came to the University of Michigan on a basketball scholarship and became a three-sport star. She earned a total of eight varsity letters at U-M in basketball, track and field, and softball. In three seasons on Michigan's varsity basketball team, Neer scored 456 points and recorded 64 blocks. During her junior year, she became U-M's first woman All-American in track and field, and as a senior, Neer became the first female athlete from the University of Michigan to win a national title in a track and field event—winning in the discus at the 1982 Association for Intercollegiate Athletics for Women (AIAW) outdoor championship. Neer was a two-time AIAW All-American and a three-time Big Ten Conference discus champion, winning Big Ten championships in 1980, 1981 and 1982. She was ranked second in the United States in the discus throw in 1985 and again in 1991 and was ranked in the top ten for eleven straight years from 1982 to 1992. Neer also holds the Michigan discus record and was named to the Big Ten All-Decade team.

Neer did not make the 1984 or 1988 Olympic teams, but continued to compete in the discus and made the 1992 Olympic team at age 33. She was the first U-M woman to qualify for the Olympics in a field event. Though she did not place at the 1992 Summer Olympics in Barcelona with a disappointing throw of 181.89 feet (55.44 meters), she was only the fourth American woman to throw the discus more than 200 feet. She broke the 200-foot mark at the 1985 Pacific Coast Championships with a throw of 201 feet 4 inches (61.37 meters).

Neer later became an MRP Analyst/Scheduler for Venture Industries. She was inducted into the University of Michigan Athletic Hall of Honor in 2002.

== See also ==
- University of Michigan Athletic Hall of Honor
- Athletics at the 1992 Summer Olympics - Women's discus throw
