= University of Michigan Athletic Hall of Honor =

Hall of fame in Ann Arbor, Michigan

The University of Michigan Athletic Hall of Honor, founded in 1978, recognizes University of Michigan athletes, coaches, and administrators who have made significant contributions to the university's athletic programs. To qualify for induction into the Hall of Honor, an individual must have been an All-American, set an NCAA, U.S., or world record, won an NCAA title, or made significant contributions to the university's athletic department as a coach or administrator. The nomination and selection process is conducted by the Letterwinners M Club executive board.

== Hall of Honor firsts ==
The first group inducted into the Hall of Honor in 1978 was Gerald R. Ford, Bill Freehan, Tom Harmon, Ron Kramer, Bennie Oosterbaan, Cazzie Russell, and Bob Ufer. The second induction class in 1979 consisted of Fritz Crisler, DeHart Hubbard, Ray Fisher, Charlie Fonville, Willie Heston, Chuck Kocsis, George Sisler, Germany Schulz, Rudy Tomjanovich and Fielding H. Yost.

The first women inducted into the Hall of Honor were Olympic diving gold medalist Micki King in 1986 and athletic administrator Marie Hartwig in 1989. The first African-American athletes inducted were Cazzie Russell (1978), Charlie Fonville (1979) and DeHart Hubbard (1979).

The first players inducted by sport are:

- Baseball – Bill Freehan (1978) and George Sisler (1979)
- Men's Basketball – Cazzie Russell (1978) and Rudy Tomjanovich (1979)
- Women's Basketball – Diane Dietz
- Cross country – Sue Frederick Foster (2004) and Melanie Weaver-Barnett (2007)
- Diving (men's) – Richard Degener (1980) and Dick Kimball (1985)
- Diving (women's) – Micki King (1986) and Chris Seufert-Sholtis (2007)
- Field hockey – Mary (Callam) Brandes (2006)
- Football – Gerald R. Ford, Tom Harmon and Ron Kramer (1978)
- Golf – Chuck Kocsis (1979) and Johnny Fischer (1980)
- Gymnastics (men's) – Newt Loken (coach, 1981) and Ed Gagnier (1992)
- Gymnastics (women's) – Beth Wymer
- Ice hockey – Vic Heyliger (1980) and John Sherf (1981)
- Softball – Penny Neer (2002) and Vicki Morrow (2004)
- Swimming (men's) – Matt Mann (coach, 1980) and Harry Holiday (1981)
- Swimming (women's) – Melinda (Copp) Harrison (2006) and Ann Colloton (2007)
- Synchronised swimming – Ruth Pickett Thompson (2008)
- Tennis – Barry MacKay (1980) and William Murphy (coach, 1983)
- Track & field (men's) – Bob Ufer (1978), DeHart Hubbard (1979) and Charlie Fonville (1979)
- Track & field (women's) – Francie Kraker Goodridge (1994)
- Volleyball – Diane Ratnik (2009)
- Wrestling – Cliff Keen (coach, 1980) and Ed Don George (1981)

== Sortable list of inductees ==
For alphabetical listing of inductees, see footnote For listing of inductees by induction year, see footnote

Name	Sport	Position/Event	Induction Year	Start Year	Finish Year	Key Accomplishments
Abbott, Jim	Baseball	Pitcher	2004	1985	1988	Led Michigan to two Big Ten championships; won the 1987 James E. Sullivan Award as the top amateur athlete in the United States
Aigler, Ralph W.	Faculty representative	Faculty representative	1982	1917	1955	Faculty representative led U-M return to Big Ten and negotiated Big Ten contract with Rose Bowl
Allard, Jenny	Softball	Third base Pitcher	2008	1987	1990	1989 Big Ten Player of the Year; head coach at Harvard 1995–2023, Pittsburgh 2024–
Anderson, Erick	Football		2019	1988	1991	Butkus & Lambert Award winner, 1991
Armstrong, Betsey	Water polo		2018	2002	2005	Four-time All-American
Bachman, Julie	Diving	Springboard	2009	1978	1981	Won national titles in 1978 on the one-meter and three-meter springboards
Barclay, Dave	Golf	Golfer	1987	1947	1947	NCAA individual golf champion, 1947
Barr, Terry	Football	Wide receiver	1994	1954	1956	
Bay, Rick	Wrestling		2010	1961	1964	Two-time Big Ten wrestling champion who never lost a Big Ten dual meet; All-American in 1963
Benedict, Moby	Baseball; Baseball coach	Shortstop; Coach	1994	1953	1979	
Berenson, Red	Ice hockey	Center; Coach	1983	1960	2017	All-American, 1962; 43 goals, 1962; head coach, 1984–2017; NCAA Championships, 1996, 1998; U-M coaching record, 848–426–92
Blott, Jack	Football, Baseball	Center Catcher	1987	1922	1924	All-American center, 1923
Brown, Dave	Football	Defensive back	2010	1971	1974	First-team All-American in 1973 and unanimous choice in 1974
Borges, Gustavo	Swimming	Freestyle	2013	1992	1995	Four Olympic medals
Boros, Steve	Baseball	Infielder	1996	1955	1957	
Brown, Robert J.	Football	Center	1982	1923	1925	All-American, 1925
Buchanan, Edsel	Gymnastics		2002			
Bullard (Mehall), Joanna	Track and field	Hurdles, high jump	2010	1980	1983	Set four Michigan records and two Big Ten records, received four All-America honors.
Buntin, Bill	Basketball	Center	1980	1963	1965	U-M record with 58 double-doubles; 1,037 rebounds ranks 2nd in U-M history; All-American, 1964, 1965
Burton, M.C.	Basketball		1988	1956	1959	First Big Ten player to lead conference in both scoring and rebounds, with 460 points and 379 boards
Cain, Sarah	Gymnastics		2020	1997	2000	Twelve-time All-American; two-time Big Ten Gymnast of the Year
Callam (Brandes), Mary	Field hockey		2006	1976	1979	
Campbell, David	Baseball	First baseman	2009		1962	
Canham, Don	Track, Athletic director	Track coach, Athletic director	1987			
Carr, Lloyd	Football	Head coach	2015	1980	2007	Led Michigan to five Big Ten titles, 1997 National Championship
Carter, Anthony	Football		2002	1979	1981	
Chamberlain, Bud	Baseball	Third baseman	1982	1940	1942	Later formed B.F. Chamberlain Real Estate in Oakland County, Michigan
Chappuis, Bob	Football, Baseball		1984		1947	
Churella, Mark	Wrestling		1996			
Clancy, Jack	Football	End	1992			
Cline, J. Daniel	Football, Baseball		2007			
Close, Casey	Baseball		2011	1983	1986	1986 Baseball America National Player of the Year; set Michigan records for home runs (46) and runs scored (190)
Colloton, Ann	Swimming		2008			
Combs, Bill	Wrestling	Wrestler	1986	1940	1941	All-American wrestler, 1940 and 1941; Killed on Iwo Jima (February 19, 1945)
Conrad, Traci	Softball	First baseman	2015	1996	1999	Set Big Ten record with 345 career hit; 2× NFCA All-American and 2× Big Ten Player of the Year
Copp (Harrison), Melinda	Swimming		2006			
Crisler, Fritz	Football	Football Coach, Athletic Director	1979	1938	1947	National Championship, 1947; Introduced winged helmet, 1938; Pioneer of separate offensive and defensive units
Crosby, Elaine	Tennis, Golf		1996			
Crumpton, Abby	Soccer		2022			
Curtis, Tom	Football		2007			
DeBol, Dave	Hockey		1996	1975	1977	Set Michigan records for most assists in a season (56), most points in a season (99), career assists (120) and career points (222)
Degener, Richard	Diving	3 metre springboard	1980	1931	1934	Gold medal, 3 metre springboard, 1936 Olympics; Bronze medal, 3 metre springboard, 1932 Olympics; 14 national indoor and outdoor diving titles
Derricotte, Gene	Football		1987			
Dierdorf, Dan	Football		1996			
Dietz, Diane	Basketball		1996			
Dolan, Tom	Swimming		2018			
Donahue, Harold	Wrestling		1988			
Donahue, Mark	Football		2016			
Downes, Hal	Hockey		2019			
Duenkel, Ginny	Swimming		2007			
Dufek Sr., Don	Football		2006			
Dufek, Don	Football, Hockey		2010	1973	1976	
Eisner, Brian	Tennis	Coach	2011	1969	1999	Led men's tennis teams to 18 Big Ten Conference team championships and six top-10 finishes at the NCAA Championships
Elliott, Bump	Football		1986			
Elliott, Jumbo	Football	Offensive tackle	2015	1984	1987	
Elliott, Pete	Football		1986			
Erskine, Randy	Golf	Golfer	1989			
Evashevski, Forest	Football, Baseball		1990			
Findlay, Samantha	Softball		2022			
Fischbach (Bailey), Mary	Diving		2017			
Fischer, Johnny	Golf	Golfer	1980	1932	1935	NCAA individual champion, 1932; Big Ten champion, 1932, 1933, 1935; US Amateur Golf Champion, 1936
Fisher, John	Wrestling		2018			
Fisher, Ray	Baseball	Baseball Coach	1979	1921	1958	14 Big Ten championships; 1953 College World Series championship; record of 636–295–8
Fishman, Herman	Basketball, Baseball	Guard, Pitcher	2002	1935	1938	All Big Ten guard; 0.86 ERA in 1936 set Big Ten record; founder of Camp Michigama
Fonville, Charlie	Track	Shot put	1979	1947	1950	Set world record in the shot put, 1948
Ford, Gerald R.	Football	Center	1978	1932	1934	MVP of 1934 football team; President of the United States
Ford, Len	Football		1996			
Foster, Sue Frederick	Cross Country, Track	Runner, Coach	2004			
Franks, Julius	Football	Guard	1982	1941	1942	All-American, 1942
Fraser, Steve	Wrestling		2006			
Freehan, Bill	Baseball	Catcher	1978	1959	1961	Set Big Ten batting record of .585, 1961; U-M Baseball Coach, 1989–95
Friedman, Benny	Football	Quarterback	1980	1925	1926	All-American, 1925–26; College Football Hall of Fame; Pro Football Hall of Fame
Frutig, Ed	Football		1988			
Gacek, Wally	Hockey		2007			Played on 1948 NCAA championship team
Gagnier, Ed	Gymnastics		1992			Big Ten All-Around gymnastics champion, 1957; Big Ten vault and parallel bars champion, 1956–57;
Gallagher, Dave	Football		2018			
Gannon, Kelli	Field hockey		2020			
Gedeon, Elmer	Track, Baseball	High hurdles, outfield, first base	1983	1936	1939	Tied the world record in the 70-yard (64 m) high hurdles
Gehrs, Mindy	Swimming		2009	1990	1993	11-time All-American, 13-time Big Ten champion and won the 400-yard individual medley national title as a senior
George, Ed Don	Wrestling	Wrestler	1981	1926	1929	AAU heavyweight champions, 1928–29; Placed 4th at 1928 Olympics
Giles, Buck	Baseball	Second baseman	1980	1923	1925	William B. "Buck" Giles; Counsel for Michigan Sports Hall of Fame; M Club President
Gillanders, Dave	Swimming		2004			
Goebel, Paul	Football	End	1981	1920	1922	All-American, 1922; U-M Regent, 1962–70
Goodridge, Francie Kraker	Track; Track coach		1994			
Grant, Gary	Basketball	Point guard	2014	1984	1988	Big Ten Player of Year and Consensus All-American, 1988
Grant, Wally	Hockey		1987			Helped Michigan win the first Frozen Four in 1948; inducted into the United States Hockey Hall of Fame in 1994
Green, Rickey	Basketball		1994			
Greene, John	Wrestling	Wrestler	1989			Later played for the Detroit Lions, 1944–1950
Griffin, Sara	Softball	Pitcher	2011	1995	1998	First Michigan softball to be selected as a first-team All-American three times
Hahn, Archie	Track		1984			
Harmon, Tom	Football	Halfback	1978	1938	1940	Heisman Trophy, 1940; All-American, 1939–40; College Football Hall of Fame
Harrison, Bob	Basketball		1989			
Hartwig, Marie	Administration	Administration	1989			
Hatch, Henry		Equipment Mgr.	1992			
Haynam, Bruce	Baseball	Shortstop	1988	1951	1953	All-American shortstop, 1953
Heikkinen, Ralph	Football		1987			
Heston, Willie	Football	Halfback	1979	1901	1904	All-American, 1903–04; College Football Hall of Fame
Hewitt, Bill	Football		2008			
Heydt, Francis	Swimming	Backstroke	1988			NCAA champion in 150-Yard Backstroke, 1941
Heyliger, Vic	Hockey	Center	1980	1935	1938	All-American player; Head coach, 1944–1957; U-M record with 116 goals; U.S. Hockey Hall of Fame
Hilkene, Bruce	Football	Tackle	1992			Captain of undefeated 1947 Michigan Wolverines football team
Hirsch, Elroy	Football, Basketball, Baseball, Track		1984			
Holiday, Harry	Swimming	Backstroke	1981	1943	1947	NCAA backstroke champion, 1943, 1947; Set 7 world records, 18 American records; Won 6 NCAA swimming championships
Hooiveld, Lara	Swimming		2019			
Howard, Desmond	Football		2008			
Howes, Lorne	Hockey		2016			
Hubbard, DeHart	Track	Long jump, 100-yard dash	1979	1922	1925	First African-American athlete to win a gold medal in an individual event; Gold medal, long jump, 1924 Olympics
Hubbard, Jarrett	Wrestling		2004			NCAA Wrestling Champion (150-pound), 1973 and 1974
Hubbard, Phil	Basketball		1992			
Hume, H. Ross	Track		1990			NCAA champion, mile(outdoor), 1944 and 1945, and in 880-yard run, 1945
Hume, Robert H.	Track		1990			Tied with his brother Ross Hume for the NCAA champion in the mile in 1944
Humphrey, Alecia	Swimming	Backstroke	2011	1992	1995	1995 NCAA champion in the 100-yard and 200-yard backstroke and 12-time NCAA All-American
Humphries, Stefan	Football		2018			
Ikola, Willard	Hockey		1990			US Hockey Hall of Fame; Head hockey coach at Edina High School for 33 years.
Johnson, Kate	Rowing		2016			
Johnson, Ron	Football	Running back	1989			All-American
Keen, Cliff	Wrestling	Wrestling Coach	1980	1925	1970	13 Big Ten championships; Coached 68 All-Americans; National Wrestling Hall of Fame
Kempthorn, Dick	Football	Linebacker, Fullback	1992	1947	1949	Most valuable player, 1948
Kimball, Dick	Diving	Diving coach	1985	1958	2005	
King, Micki	Diving	Springboard, Platform	1986	1961	1965	Won ten NCAA championships in platform and springboard diving, 1965–1972; Won gold medal in 3-meter springboard at 1972 Summer Olympics
Kipke, Harry	Football, Basketball, Baseball	End	1981	1921	1933	Three-time football All-American, 1921–23; Football coach, 1929–37; National Championships, 1932–33
Kocsis, Chuck	Golf	Golfer	1979	1934	1936	NCAA individual champion, 1936
Kramer, Ron	Football	End	1978	1954	1956	All-American, 1955–56; College Football Hall of Fame
Lang, Brent	Swimming		2015	1987	1990	
Larkin, Barry	Baseball	Shortstop	2007	1982	1985	2-time All-American and Big Ten Player of the Year, 1984 & 1985; 12-time MLB All-Star; 1990 World Series champion; 1995 National League MVP; National Baseball Hall of Fame
LaRose, Gil	Gymnastics		2017			
Larsen (Rainsberger), Lisa	Track/Cross Country		2017			
Law, Ty	Football		2020			
Leach, Michael	Tennis		2008			NCAA Singles Tennis Champion 1982
Leach, Rick	Football	Quarterback	2009	1976	1979	
Lee, George C.	Basketball	forward/guard	1983	1957	1959	
Legacki, Frank	Swimming		1994			
Loken, Newt	Gymnastics	Gymnastics coach	1981	1948	1983	Coaching record: 250–72–1; NCAA championships in Gymnastics, 1963, 1970, and Trampoline, 1969, 1970
Lund, Don	Football, Baseball, Basketball	Baseball coach	1984			
Lytle, Rob	Football	Running back	2013	1973	1976	Broke Michigan's career rushing record; finished 3rd in 1976 Heisman voting
MacFarland, Bill	Hockey		2009	1955	1956	Captain of Michigan teams that won back-to-back NCAA championships in 1955 and 1956; later president of WHA
Mack, Tom	Football		2006			
MacKay, Barry	Tennis	Singles; Doubles	1980	1955	1957	NCAA singles champion, 1957; Five-time Big Ten champion (2 singles, 3 doubles)
MacInnes, John	Hockey	Goalie	1994		1950	Goalie for Michigan's 1950 NCAA championship team; later played for Bruins and Red Wings; coach at Michigan Tech, 1956–82
Maentz, Tom	Football		1994			
Mandich, Jim	Football		1994			
Mann, Matt	Swimming	Swim Coach	1980	1926	1954	Overall record of 201–25–3 as coach; 13 NCAA team titles; 16 Big Ten team titles
Marshall, Wendy	Gymnastics	Gymnast	2010	1993	1996	NCAA second-team All–American on vault and all-around, All-Big Ten, and two-time Michigan co-MVP
Matchefts, John	Hockey		2015	1950	1953	Led Michigan to three consecutive NCAA championships from 1951 to 1953
McClimon, Molly	Cross-country		2011	1991	1994	Three-time All-American; Big Ten Athlete of the Year
McCormick, Tim	Basketball		2006			
McCoy, Ernie	Basketball, Baseball	Basketball coach, Assoc. A.D., Asst.Football Coach	1986			
McEwen, Don	Track		1988			Held 55 year record for fastest two-mile time in a dual meet between Michigan and Ohio State (9:04.6).
McGregor, Katie	Track, Cross-country	Distance	2014	1995	1999	1998 NCAA champion in cross-country, 3000m-run, and Distance Medley (1600m leg); 8-time All-American; 2005 USATF champion in 10000m-run; 2005 & 2006 USTAF champion in 10 km road race; 2007 USATF champion in 25 km road race
McKenzie, Reggie	Football		2004			
McMillan, Gordon	Hockey		1992	1945	1949	Scored 175 points, and played on the first Frozen Four championship team
McRae, Bennie	Football, Track		2002			
Messner, Mark	Football	Defensive tackle	2014	1985	1988	Consensus All-American, 1988
Meyer, Greg	Track, Cross-country		2010	1973	1977	Three-time cross-country All-American (1974–76), 1976 track and field All-American, winner of the 1983 Boston Marathon
Mitchell, Elmer D.	Director of Intramural Sports		2002			
Mogk, Bill	Baseball		2002			
Morrison, Brendan	Hockey	Center	2013	1993	1997	Hobey Baker Award, 1997; played in NHL 1997–2012
Morrison, Maynard	Football	Fullback/center	1983	1929	1931	First-team All-American in 1931
Morrow, Vicki	Softball		2004			
Murphy, William	Tennis	Coach	1983	1948	1969	His teams won 11 Big Ten championship and the NCAA championship in 1957
Nalan, Norvard "Skip"	Wrestling		2017			
Neer, Penny	Basketball, Softball, Track		2002			
Nelson, Dave	Football, Baseball		1986			
Newman, Harry	Football	Quarterback	1983	1930	1932	Unanimous first-team All-American; recipient of the Douglas Fairbanks Trophy as Outstanding College Player of the Year, Helms Athletic Foundation Player of the Year Award, and the Chicago Tribune Silver Football
Nichols, Harold	Wrestling	145-pound weight class	1983	1938	1939	1939 NCAA champion, 145-pound weight class; coach at Iowa State, 1957–1983
Nunley, Frank	Football, Baseball		1989			
Oosterbaan, Bennie	Football, Basketball, Baseball	End, Football coach, Basketball coach	1978	1925	1958	Three-time All-American in football 1925–27; All-American in basketball; Football Coach, 1948–58; National Championship, 1948; College Football Hall of Fame
Orr, Johnny	Basketball	Coach	2011	1968	1980	Winningest coach in Michigan men's basketball program history with a 209–113 overall record
Ortmann, Chuck	Football	Quarterback	2004			
Orwig, Bill	Football, Basketball	Basketball coach	1984			
Osgood, Bob	Track	High hurdles	1983	1935	1937	Set a world record in 120-yard high hurdles, 1937
Paciorek, Jim	Baseball	First baseman, Outfielder	2020	1979	1982	1982 Big Ten Player of the Year; First-team All-American
Perry, Lowell	Football	End, Safety	1989	1950	1952	Two-time All-American; first African-American assistant coach in NFL history
Plant, Marcus	Faculty representative	Faculty representative	1982			Faculty representative to Big Ten; President of the NCAA; Law School professor; Member, U.S. Olympic Committee
Porter, Dave	Football, Wrestling		1985	1966	1968	
Pregulman, Merv	Football		1988			
Ratnik, Diane	Volleyball		2009	1980		Played for Canada in the 1984 and 1996 Olympics
Ray, Elise	Gymnastics		2015	2001	2005	Most decorated female gymnast in Michigan history
Renfrew, Al	Hockey	Hockey coach, Ticket mgr.	1986			Won NCAA championships at U-M as player (1948) and coach (1964)
Rice, Glen	Basketball		2010	1985	1989	Leading scorer in Michigan basketball history, led the 1989 team to an NCAA championship, jersey retired in 2005
Richardson, Jim	Swimming and Diving	Coach	2022			
Rickey, Branch	Baseball	Baseball coach	1985	1910	1913	Four-time World Series champion general manager with Cardinals; integrated professional baseball as general manager of the Dodgers; National Baseball Hall of Fame
Ritter, Jennie	Softball		2018			
Robinson, Tom	Track		1985			Represented Bahamas in four Summer Olympics; gold medalist in the 100 meters at 1962 Central American and Caribbean Games
Roby, Doug	Football, Baseball	Baseball coach	1984			
Russell, Campy	Basketball		2002			
Russell, Cazzie	Basketball	Guard	1978	1964	1966	Oscar Robertson Trophy, 1966; All-American, 1964–66
Schalon, Edward	Golf		1982	1947	1949	Big Ten individual champion, 1947, 1949
Schembechler, Bo	Football	Head coach	1992			
Schroeder, John	Golf		1992			
Schulz, Germany	Football	Center	1979	1904	1908	All-American, 1907; Center on AP All-Time All-American Team, 1951; College Football Hall of Fame
Seegert, Alicia	Softball		2006			
Senkowski, Ray	Tennis		1996			
Seufert-Sholtis, Chris	Diving		2007		1978	Bronze medalist, 1984 Summer Olympics
Sherf, John	Hockey	Left wing	1981	1933	1936	Leading scorer in Big Ten, 1936 (33 goals, 10 assists in 17 games); first U.S. citizen to play for Stanley Cup champion
Simmons, Red	Track & Field	Coach	2022			
Simpkins, Ron	Football		2019			
Sisler, George	Baseball	Pitcher	1979	1914	1915	Baseball Hall of Fame; No. 33 on The Sporting News' list of "Baseball's 100 Greatest Players"
Skinner, Jim	Swimming		1990			
Smith, Ben	Golf		1985			
Spillane (Postma), Joan	Swimming		2020			
Stager, Gus	Swimming	Swimming Coach	1982	1954	1982	Four NCAA team championships, 1957–61
Stoller, Sam	Track		2018			
Strack, Dave	Basketball	Basketball coach	1984			
Sullivan, Kevin	Cross country	Athlete, coach	2015	1993	2015	14 All-American honors and won 4 NCAA titles (one relay and 3 individual)
Supronowicz, Mack	Basketball		1990			
Thomas, Stacey	Basketball		2019			
Thompson, Ruth Pickett	Synchronized Swimming		2008			
Tidwell, John	Basketball		1996			
Tolan, Eddie	Track	100 metres; 200 metres	1980	1928	1932	Gold medals in 100 and 200 metres, 1932 Olympics; Set world record in 100 yard dash at 9.5
Tomasi, Dominic	Football, Baseball		1994			
Tomek, Ellen	Rowing		2022			
Tomjanovich, Rudy	Basketball	Forward	1979	1967	1970	All-American, 1970; U-M record in rebounds; 2nd pick in 1970 NBA draft
Tompkins, Jack	Hockey, Baseball	Goaltender	1982	1930	1932	Captain of hockey and baseball teams; All-American in hockey, 1931–32
Townsend, John	Basketball	Forward, center	1980	1936	1938	All-American, 1938; All-Big Ten, 1936–38
Trueblood, Thomas	Golf	Golf coach	1981	1921	1935	Formed golf team, 1901; NCAA golf champions, 1934–35; Big Ten champions, 1932–36; 67 years as speech professor and debate coach
Turco, Marty	Hockey		2017			
Ufer, Bob	Track	440 yards	1978	1941	1943	Set world indoor record of 48.1 in the indoor 440 yard; All-American, 1943; Once held eight U-M track records; Broadcaster of U-M football, 1944–81
Urbanchek, Jon	Swimming	Coach	2016			
Vick, Ernie	Football	Center	1982	1918	1921	All-American, 1921
Volk, Rick	Football	Safety	1989			All-American
Wahl, Robert	Football		2004			
Wakabayashi, Mel	Hockey	Center	2006	1964	1966	First-team All-American and MVP of the WCHA in 1966; played on 1964 NCAA championship team
Wakefield, Dick	Baseball	Outfielder	1983	1941	1941	Led Michigan to 1941 Big Ten championship; signed as "bonus baby" in 1941
Ward, Willis	Track, Football	Multiple	1981	1932	1935	NCAA champion in high jump, long jump, 100-yard dash, 400-yard dash; 2nd in voting for AP Big Ten Athlete of the Year, 1933; 2nd African-American in football
Washington, MaliVai	Tennis		2017			
Watson, William	Track	Multiple	1982	1937	1939	Big Ten champion in discus, 1937–39; broad jump, 1937–38; shot put, 1937–38; javelin, 1939
Weaver-Barnett, Melanie	Track, Cross Country		2007			
Weber, Wally	Football	Fullback, Halfback	1981	1925	1958	Halfback and fullback, 1925–26; Assistant football coach, 1931–58
Webster, Bob	Diving	Platform	1989	1960	1964	Two Olympic gold medals in 10m platform event, 1960 and 1964
Weinstein (McGrath), Barbara	Diving		2010	1978	1980	Three-time 10-meter platform national champion (1976, 1979, 1980), four-time All-American
Weisenburger, Jack	Football, Baseball		1992			
Welborne, Tripp	Football		2020			
Westfall, Bob	Football	Fullback	1982	1939	1941	All-American, 1941
White, Bob	Hockey	Defense	2004			Two-time All-American defenseman 1958 and 1959
Wilkie, Gordon	Hockey		1989	1961	1964	Led Michigan to 1964 NCAA championship
Williams-Hoak, Debbie	Track & Field		2022			
Willis, Nick	Track/Cross Country		2019			
Wilmore, Henry	Basketball	Guard/Forward	2004	1970	1973	Two-time All-American; two-time All-Big Ten First Team
Wistert, Albert	Football	Tackle	1981	1940	1942	All-American, 1942; College Football Hall of Fame
Wistert, Alvin	Football	Tackle	1981	1947	1949	All-American, 1948–49; College Football Hall of Fame
Wistert, Whitey	Football, Baseball	Tackle	1981	1931	1934	All-American; Big Ten Baseball MVP, 1934; College Football Hall of Fame
Woodson, Charles	Football	Cornerback	2017	1995	1997	1997 Heisman Trophy winner; 1997 national champion; College Football Hall of Fame; Pro Football Hall of Fame
Wymer (Humbles), Beth	Gymnastics		2006			
Yost, Fielding H.	Football	Football coach, Athletic Director	1979	1901	1941	Football coach, 1901–23, 1925–26; athletic director, 1921–41; National Championships, 1901–04, 1918, 1923; record of 165–29–10; Outscored opponents 2,822 to 42, 1901–05
Zatkoff, Roger	Football	Linebacker, Defensive end	1985	1950	1952	Two-time first-team All-Big Ten; three-time Pro Bowler & two-time first-team All-Pro
Zimmerman, Lexi	Volleyball		2020	2007	2010	

== See also ==
- Michigan Wolverines
