= Melinda Copp =

Canadian swimmer

Personal information
- Full name: Melinda Copp
- National team: Canada
- Born: July 7, 1962 (age 64) London, Ontario
- Height: 1.73 m (5 ft 8 in)
- Weight: 65 kg (143 lb)

Sport
- Sport: Swimming
- Strokes: Backstroke
- Club: London Aquatic Club
- College team: University of Michigan

Melinda Copp (born July 7, 1962), later known by her married name Melinda Harrison, is a former competitive swimmer from Canada. A native of London, Ontario, she attended the University of Michigan where she was the women's captain of the Michigan Wolverines swimming and diving team. She swam the backstroke and individual medley for Michigan, won four Big Ten Conference championships. She was also selected as an All-American swimmer in four events—the 100-yard backstroke, 400-yard individual medley, 200-yard individual medley, and as a member of the 400-yard medley relay team.

At the 1984 Summer Olympics in Los Angeles, she became the first Michigan Wolverines women's varsity swimmer to compete in the Olympics, representing Canada in the 200-meter backstroke. She was inducted into the University of Michigan Athletic Hall of Honor in 2006; she was the first woman swimmer to receive the honor.

== See also ==
- University of Michigan Athletic Hall of Honor
