= Henry O'Neil =

Henry O'Neil may refer to:

- Henry Nelson O'Neil (1817–1880), historical genre painter and minor Victorian writer
- Henry O'Neil (bishop) (1907–1997), bishop in Canada

== See also ==
- Henry O'Neill (disambiguation)
- Henry O'Neal, in Flirtation Walk
