= Herman Fishman =

American baseball and basketball player

Herman Fishman (March 7, 1917 – December 14, 1967) was an American basketball and baseball player and the founder of the sports camp, Camp Michigama. He played basketball and baseball for the University of Michigan from 1935–1938 and was selected for the All Big Ten basketball and baseball teams. He was inducted into the University of Michigan Athletic Hall of Honor in 2002. He was also inducted into the Michigan Jewish Sports Hall of Fame in 1987.

== Early years ==
Fishman grew up in Detroit, Michigan, and attended Detroit Northern High School where he was named to the All-City teams in basketball, football, and baseball. He also won the state tennis championship while in high school.

== University of Michigan ==
Fishman enrolled at the University of Michigan where he played for the varsity basketball and baseball teams and quarterbacked the freshman football team. He earned six varsity letters at Michigan, three in basketball (1936–38) and three in baseball (1936–38). In basketball, Fishman played guard and played in 54 games for Michigan. He led the Big Ten Conference guards in scoring, and was selected for the All Big Ten basketball team. He was also named to the Jewish Telegraphic Agency's Jewish All-American team.

In baseball, Fishman was a pitcher who helped Michigan win the Big Ten baseball championship in 1936. He was selected to the All-Big Ten baseball team. In 1936, he set a Big Ten conference pitching record with an ERA of 0.86; his record was not broken until the 1950s.

He and his three brothers Ben, Manny, and Mickey are the only four brothers in the history of the University of Michigan to all earn varsity letters. His son Steve also was a varsity letterwinner in basketball, playing at U-M from 1967–70.

== Professional baseball and World War II ==
After graduating from University of Michigan, Herman pitched in the Cincinnati Reds minor league organization, and advanced to their Triple A team. Upon the United States entry into World War II, Fishman enlisted in the U.S. Navy. During the war, Fishman played on a military all-star team that was managed by Mickey Cochrane and included Bob Feller. He went overseas in the Navy and was a World War II intelligence veteran.

== Camp Michigama and sports promoter ==
After the war, Fishman and his brother Mickey Fishman founded a sports camp called Camp Michigama. The camp was staffed by former college athletes and became a popular summer camp for Michigan's best Jewish athletes. Fishman and his brother ran the camp from 1946–1966.

During the 1950s and 1960s, Fishman was active in Sports for Israel, an organization that raised money to stimulate sports in Israel. He also served on the board of directors of the Detroit Pistons from 1957–1967.

== Death and posthumous honors ==
Fishman died in 1967 at age 50 at the Jewish Community Center in Detroit after playing squash. He was posthumously inducted into the Michigan Jewish Sports Hall of Fame in 1987. In 2002, he was also inducted into the University of Michigan Athletic Hall of Honor. In a profile written about the 2002 Hall of Honor inductees, the Michigan Daily called Fishman one of the university's "most versatile athletes." In 2008, Fishman was selected by Bounce Magazine to the Detroit All-Decade basketball team for the 1930s.

== See also ==
- University of Michigan Athletic Hall of Honor
