= Ralph W. Aigler =

American law professor

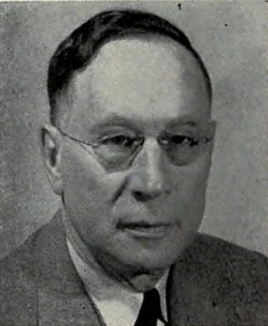
- Ralph Aigler, 1951
- Born: February 12, 1885; Bellevue, Ohio, US
- Died: May 24, 1964 (age 79); Tucson, Arizona, US
- Education: University of Michigan
- Occupation: Law professor

Ralph W. Aigler (February 12, 1885 – May 24, 1964) was an American law professor at the University of Michigan from 1910–1954, the University's faculty representative to the Big Ten Conference from 1917 to 1955, and chairman of Michigan's Faculty Board in Control of Athletics from 1917 to 1942. Aigler was a renowned expert on real property law and one of the advisors to the American Law Institute in the drafting of the Restatement of the Law of Property. He is best known, however, for his contributions to the athletics programs at the University of Michigan. Aigler's contributions included leading Michigan back into the Big Ten Conference, leading the effort to construct Michigan Stadium, Yost Fieldhouse and other facilities, negotiating the Big Ten's exclusive contract with the Rose Bowl starting in 1946, hiring Fritz Crisler as football coach and athletic director, and acting as a spokesman for the University and Big Ten for many years on NCAA rules and eligibility issues. He was inducted into the University of Michigan Athletic Hall of Honor in 1982.

== Early years ==
Aigler was born in Bellevue, Ohio, in 1885. He received an LL.B. degree from the University of Michigan Law School in 1907. After graduating, he took a job with the Rosenthal & Hammill law firm in Chicago.

== Law professor ==
Aigler joined the faculty of Michigan's Law School and served as professor of law until 1954. He was a renowned expert in the area of property law and was one of the advisors to the American Law Institute in the preparation of the first Restatement of the Law on Property in 1936. Aigler published at least 123 articles on legal topics including real property, negotiable instruments, trusts, banks and banking, and Constitutional law. He also served as the President of the Association of American Law Schools.

== Return to the Big Ten Conference ==
In addition to his work as a law professor, Aigler also served as the University's faculty representative to the Big Ten Conference from 1917 to 1955, and chairman of Michigan's Faculty Board in Control of Athletics from 1917 to 1942. Michigan had left the Big Ten Conference in 1907, and Aigler led the school back into Conference membership. In June 1917, The New York Times reported that the Conference's faculty representatives had voted unanimously to invite Michigan to resume athletic relations with the "Big Nine". The article noted that "Professor R.W. Aigler, Chairman of Michigan's Athletic Board of Control", attended the meeting as Michigan's representative.

== Construction of Michigan Stadium and other facilities ==
Aigler was also a leader in the construction of Michigan Stadium. In July 1926, Aigler was appointed to the Stadium Building Committee, which was empowered "to appoint the General Engineer for the building of the stadium and to let contracts for the excavation, placing of abutments, drainage, etc., so that work may proceed immediately." The stadium was built on time and within its budget, and Aigler presented a detailed report on construction costs to the Board in Control of Athletics; the total cost was $1,131,733.36.

He was also the chairman of the Board in Control of Athletics during the construction of Yost Fieldhouse and the Intramural Building.

== Spokesman for Michigan and Big Ten athletics ==
Aigler also became the voice of the University, and at times of the Big Ten, on athletics eligibility and rules issues. In 1925, Aigler defended intercollegiate athletics against charges that they had a negative effect on institutions of higher learning. Aigler said that the harm done by athletics was almost nothing when compared to the evils caused by "common loafing". "The greatest vice in American college life today is loafing", said Aigler. "There is no doubt that this far overshadows the harm created by intercollegiate athletics. No one would be more pleased than I to see a Phi Beta Kappa (honorary scholarship society) man receive as much recognition by the public as do our leading athletes. But such a condition would be contrary to human nature. Intellectual attainments do not make such an appeal, and that is why athletics are so prominent in colleges and universities today."

In 1929 and 1930, with the expulsion of the University of Iowa from the Big Ten for rules violations, Aigler was the spokesman of the Conference. He was also chairman of the Big Ten when Iowa sought reinstatement in 1933.

When Howard J. Savage of the Carnegie Foundation issued "Bulletin 33" in January 1930 criticizing recruitment and subsidization of athletes, Aigler challenged the fairness of the report. Aigler charged that Savage had "no intention of being fair and accurate" and accused Savage of questionable tactics in sending Michigan's president a report of conditions different from the report in the bulletin. Aigler also accused Savage of removing letters from the files of the athletic department to which he was allowed full access. He also argued that the report reflected eastern bias: "In a number of places in the Bulletin the so-called Western Conference (now the Big Nine) is referred to and, curiously, almost always with a sort of half veiled sneer. The truth apparently is that the Bulletin was written from the point of view of the Eastern athletic man who has it pretty firmly fixed in mind that, athletically, things are pretty raw in the territory generally West of the Alleghenies." Aigler later issued a 31-page report on athletic conditions at Michigan, charging the Carnegie Foundation with "muck-raking".

When the North Central Association of Colleges and Schools sought to usurp rule-making powers with regard to athletics, Aigler defended the authority and jurisdiction of the Big Ten. He said: "By agreement of the universities constituting the Big Ten for many years the making of rules and administration of athletic affairs, except that of purely local concern, have been delegated to the conference. This conference was a pioneer in athletic reform movements. Its organization has been the model for many years all over the country and its legislation generally has been widely copied. The aim of the conference not only has been to provide uniform eligibility rules, but also to *** and keep athletic activities in a proper relationship to the main business of the universities. Recently there has been developed in the North Central association a movement to take hold of matters heretofore handled by the conference."

Aigler came under fire in 1936 for his public statement about moves at the University of Wisconsin to shift oversight of athletics away from the faculty. Aigler issued a statement on behalf of the Big Ten criticizing Wisconsin for establishing a non-faculty governing body. Aigler said, "The evidence before the Conference indicated strongly that the Wisconsin regents for several years have shown a disposition to subordinate faculty desires to the wishes of such outsiders." In response to Aigler's charge, one Wisconsin newspaper asked: "Was he Ignorant, or Did he Want Some Publicity?"

As the long-time chairman of the Board in Control of Athletics, Aigler issued annual reports to the University Senate on the state of the athletics programs. In 1921, Aigler's report stated that football was the only sport that paid for itself. In that fiscal year, football generated $73,766.76 "while its expenses were $41,176.10, leaving a profit of $32,590.66." Baseball exceeded its revenues by $5,000, and track cost $8,203 above receipts. According to Aigler's reports total athletic receipts were $148,000 against disbursements of $155,000. In 1937, Aigler reported football receipts of $153,836.34, exceeding disbursements by $102,683.42. Football was again the only sport to pay for itself, and the profit from football was enough to create an overall profit of $50,000 from the athletic programs. Aigler referred to the football's team's three-year losing streak as a "lesson in humility".

== Hiring of Crisler and retirement of Yost ==
Ralph Aigler Interviews Fritz Crisler, Feb. 1938

Fielding H. Yost became the football coach and then athletic director at the University of Michigan since 1901. Aigler was also one of the first persons within the University to challenge Yost's authority. In 1937, Aigler's hiring of former Notre Dame head coach Hunk Anderson as assistant football coach was seen as a sign that "the iron hand of Fielding Yost carries less power than it did." At the time, it was reported: "Prof. Ralph Aigler is said to be rapidly becoming the dominant figure in Michigan's athletics."

Charges surfaced in November 1937 that Michigan's freshman athletes had been subsidized with employment through an Ann Arbor manufacturing concern at a higher rate than other employees, and with funds controlled by alumni. When Aigler was reported to have said that "all freshman athletes at Michigan would be presumed to have been subsidized", it was perceived to be part of political infighting among those in control of Michigan's athletic programs.

Harry Kipke was fired as Michigan's head coach in December 1937, and Yost and Aigler were authorized to begin interviewing candidates for Kipke's job. On February 10, 1938, Aigler made a public announcement that Fritz Crisler had been hired as Michigan's new head football coach. Aigler was reported to have hired Crisler without Yost's knowledge. In fact, the report of Crisler's hiring was combined with indications that "the impending retirement of Fielding H. Yost as Michigan's athletic director will be hastened to put Crisler in complete control." At that point, "it became clear that Yost no longer ran the athletic department. Uncharacteristically, Yost did not raise a ruckus; instead, he stepped aside graciously."

The U-M Regents reorganized athletic oversight in 1942 and replaced the Faculty Board of Athletic Control with a new intercollegiate athletics board, and Crisler succeeded Aigler as chairman of the body with ultimate authority to hire and fire coaches. Aigler remained the faculty representative to the Big Ten until 1955.

== Opposition to athletic scholarships ==
For many years, Aigler was an outspoken opponent of athletic scholarships. In 1939, the Michigan Student Senate adopted a resolution favoring tuition scholarships for varsity athletes with at least a "B" average. The resolution was intended to rid college sports of unseemly under-the-table subsidies and to provide a "fair return for services" to the athletes who made possible the "big business" of college sports. Aigler opposed the move, saying: "You can't give athletic scholarships without aspiring to the sigma of professionalism. . . . Other schools have tried it, and if the practice enjoys widespread continuance, it will prove the doom of collegiate sport." Aigler argued that scholarships were a form of payment that undermined the concept of the unpaid student athlete. He said: "Those college teams made up of scholarship holders and the like should be grouped with the Giants, Redskins, Bears, etc., instead of with those teams made up of bona fide college students to whom athletic participation must be secondary." On another occasion, he urged schools granting athletic scholarships, though "ostensibly amateur", to "turn square and associate themselves with the Washington Redskins and Green Bay Packers."

Aigler even proposed that under the monitorship of the NCAA, the non-scholarship colleges and universities should sever athletic relations with institutions refusing to meet the standard. In 1948, Aigler was one of the drafters and advocates of the NCAA's "purity" code prohibiting any form of subsidization of student athletes. Aigler later served as the Secretary-Treasurer of the NCAA from 1955–1956. In that role, Aigler eventually relented and worked on the rule changes permitting universities to grant full-ride scholarships to student athletes.

== Big Ten contract with Rose Bowl ==
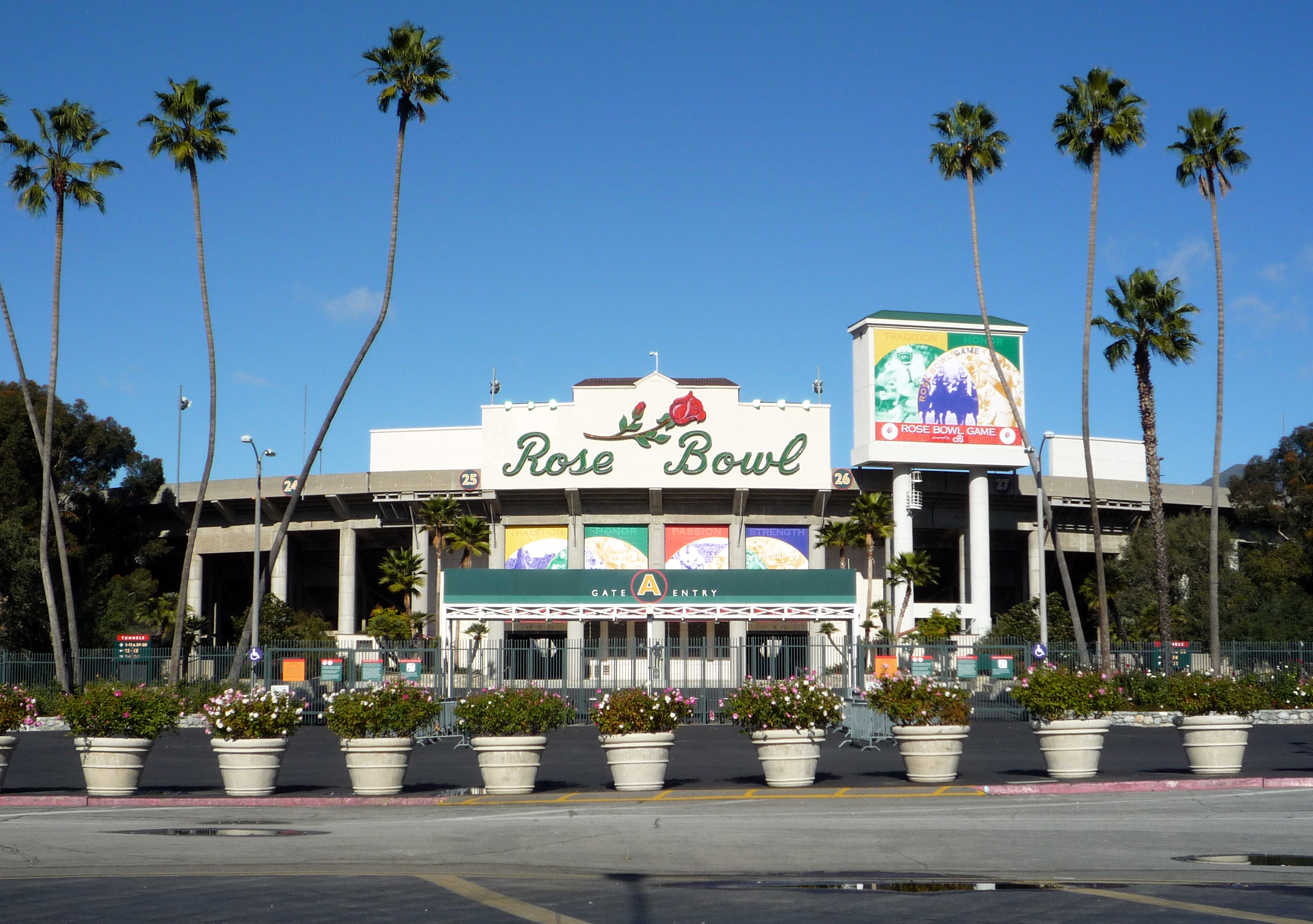
Aigler negotiated the Big Ten's exclusive contracts with the Rose Bowl

Aigler also played an important role in securing the Big Ten's long-term contract with the Rose Bowl. Prior to the 1947 season, the visiting spot in the Rose Bowl was open to all conferences, and the Big Ten champion only appeared in the Rose Bowl on rare occasions. In November 1946, Aigler was appointed to a five-person steering committee assigned to negotiate an exclusive contract with the Rose Bowl. The Big Ten approved the exclusive arrangement by a vote of 7 to 2, with Illinois and Minnesota the only opponents. The relationship was negotiated at meetings between Aigler and the Big Ten steering committee and the Pacific Coast Conference held in Berkeley, California in November 1946. Aigler traveled to California again in May 1947 with William Reed to negotiate administrative details of the Rose Bowl arrangement with Pacific Coast Conference representative William C. Ackerman. The University of Michigan was the first Big Ten participant in the new Rose Bowl arrangement, defeating the USC Trojans 49–0 in the game held on January 1, 1948.

Aigler was again part of a five-person committee in 1953 that negotiated the extension of the Big Ten contract with the Rose Bowl. The renewal passed by a vote of 6–4, with Wisconsin, Purdue, and Illinois voting against the deal.

== Later years and honors ==
Aigler was presented with an Honorary "M" (normally reserved for varsity athletes) by the University of Michigan "M" Club for his contributions to the school's athletic programs.

In 1955, Aigler moved to Tucson, Arizona, joined the faculty of the University of Arizona College of Law, and taught a course in bills and notes.

Aigler died in 1964 in at St. Joseph's Hospital Tucson. He was posthumously inducted into the University of Michigan Athletic Hall of Honor in 1982, as part of the fifth induction class.
