= Thomas Trueblood =

College professor, golf coach, author, born 1856

Thomas Clarkson Trueblood
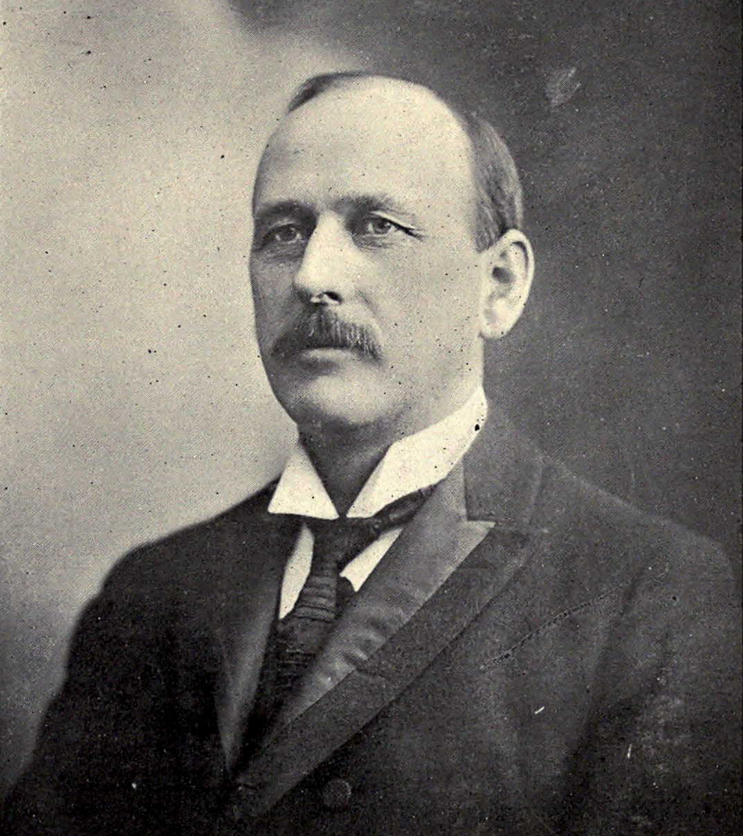
- Trueblood from the 1902 Michiganensian
- Born: April 6, 1856; Salem, Indiana, US
- Died: June 5, 1951 (aged 95); Bradenton, Florida, US
- Occupation: Professor
- Employer: University of Michigan

Thomas Clarkson Trueblood (April 6, 1856 – June 5, 1951) was an American professor of elocution and oratory and the first coach of the University of Michigan golf and debate teams. He was affiliated with the University of Michigan for 67 years from 1884 to 1951, and was a nationally known writer and speaker on oratory and debate. He founded UM's Department of Elocution and Oratory as well as the campus debate program. He became the subject of national media attention in 1903 when the Chicago Tribune ran an article stating that he was offering a new "course in love making." His golf teams won two NCAA National Championships and five Big Ten Conference championships. He was posthumously inducted into the University of Michigan Athletic Hall of Honor in 1981.

== Professor of Elocution and Oratory ==
Trueblood was a native of Salem, Indiana. He attended Earlham College in Richmond, Indiana and received an A.M. degree. In 1878, Trueblood and Robert I. Fulton established the Fulton and Trueblood School of Oratory in Kansas City, Missouri, which became "one of the largest and best known institutions of its kind in the United States." In 1884, Trueblood came to Ann Arbor as a lecturer on public speaking, intending to give a six-week course. The next year he was invited back. At the time he also was lecturing at Missouri, Kentucky and Ohio Wesleyan, and working out of Fulton and Trueblood School. Michigan asked him to join the faculty, and he stayed for 67 years. In 1892, he founded the Department of Elocution and Oratory and became its first chairman. Michigan's Oratory and Elocution Department was the first such unit in any major university or college in the country. He also established the first credit course in speech at any American university. At the turn of the century, speech and oratory played an important role in American society and academia, so much so that Trueblood was the highest paid professor on the University of Michigan faculty, and students were required to take Trueblood's courses.

In addition, Trueblood organized and coached the competitive debate and oratory contests at Michigan. He established the Northern Oratorical League, and later the Central Debating League, for the purpose of conducting competitive debates among Midwestern Universities, including Michigan, the University of Chicago, Northwestern, Oberlin College, Iowa, and Minnesota. In 1903, an Iowa newspaper noted: "It was due to his zeal in organization, his success in persuading students to enter the competitive contests, and his skill in drilling them, that has enabled Michigan to take so high a rank in oratory in these league contests, with seven first honors to her credit in ten years, and nine of the twelve victories in debate."

Trueblood also delivered speeches and gave dramatic readings on tours all over the world. One newspaper noted: "As a reader Prof. Trueblood is well known throughout the west. His readings are taken from the best literature, with special attention to Shakespearean work. It is his plan to give the principal scenes of the play, narrating the unimportant parts, thus providing an entertainment acceptable to those who do not attend the theater." After a performance of Hamlet in 1908, an Iowa newspaper wrote: "Prof. Trueblood is a man of remarkable personality. His cuttings of the play were taken from the most dramatic parts, giving a wide range of understanding of all the characters. Not only were the different parts interpreted with extremely keen judgment of the most real kind, but the speaker introduced each division with a brief description and delineation of the men and women who appeared. Prof. Trueblood's manner of speaking and his diction are acquirements of a very high character and he held the interest of his hearers from beginning to end."

Trueblood was president of the National Association of Elocutionists when they met in June 1899 for their annual convention at Chautauqua Institute, New York. He brought with him Charles Casper Simons, a law student who coached the debate team for Trueblood. Simons had won first honors in a speech contest with his oration on abolitionist John Brown. Knowing that Southern elocutionists would be in attendance, Trueblood asked Simons to deliver his tribute to Brown at the conference. One account of the conference states: "The introduction was delivered without much reaction; but when Simons intoned, 'The South had slain the man, but the spirit which animated him was beyond the reach of earthly power,' the Southerners were distressed. Simons went on to proclaim that John Brown 'taught the South that a new era had begun, that not by persuasion, threat or rant, but by force was slavery to be exterminated.' The Southern members of the association walked out of the amphitheater in angry protest."

== Michigan's first African-American debate champion ==
In the early 1900s, Michigan's athletic teams (and those throughout the country) were re-segregated. While George Jewett had played for the Michigan football team in 1890 and 1892, the next African-American to play on the football team was Willis Ward, forty years later in 1932. During this period of athletic segregation, an African-American, Eugene Joseph Marshall, was permitted to compete in Trueblood's debate competitions and won the university debate championship in 1903. The Ann Arbor Argus reported: "For the first time in the history of American universities, a colored man has won his highest honors in oratory in fair and free competition with all comers. The announcement of his victory will be read with pleasure by all who are working for the betterment of the colored race." Trueblood entertained Marshall at his home and presented him with the Chicago Alumni Medal. Marshall subsequently placed second in the Midwest regional collegiate competition.

== The Jam Handy incident ==
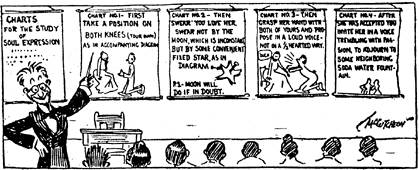
Lampoon of "Professor Foxy Truesport," Chicago Record-Herald, May 9, 1903

In May 1903, Trueblood became the subject of national media attention as a result of a newspaper article written by a 17-year-old freshman student claiming Trueblood was teaching a new "course in lovemaking." The student, Jam Handy, was a campus correspondent for the Chicago Tribune. In the class, Trueblood taught "the delivery of short extracts from masterpieces of oratory." One such extract involved a scene from a play in which a man kneels in front of a woman pleading for her hand. In his 1893 textbook Practical Elements of Elocution, Trueblood used the scene to illustrate the "aspirate explosive" form of speech.

After watching Trueblood act out the kneeling scene, Handy wrote an article that was published on the front page of the Chicago Tribune on May 8, 1903, with a headline stating: "Learn Sly Cupid's Tricks; Students at Ann Arbor Take Lessons in Love Making." The article suggested that Trueblood was instructing his male students on romance rather than oratory technique. The next day, the Chicago Record-Herald published a three-panel cartoon of "Professor Foxy Truesport" dreaming up ways to "teach his class how to properly make love." Newspapers across the country picked up the story. The Daily Northwestern wrote: "Professor Trueblood of Michigan University has inaugurated a course in love making, his motive being to stimulate interest in his classes. The oratorical students are compelled to kneel and make fervid declarations to lady students." The Newark Advocate's headline read: "Lovemaking Lessons: Novel Course In the University of Michigan; Sly Cupid's Tricks Taught." The Salt Lake Tribune reported:

- "Lessons in Lovemaking. The University of Michigan has added a new course to the curriculum, one that may best be styled a course in love making. Prof. Trueblood is the inventor of the novel scheme, and his course, which has been hitherto shunned as one of the toughest at the university, now seems likely to become the most popular on campus... Early this week he hit upon the successful plan, and now the many visitors who attend his classes are spectators of thrilling love scenes. Fifty times a day Prof. Trueblood is forced to kneel to some maiden and show his pupils the right way to declare their devotion to their sweethearts... Each budding orator takes his place before a blushing maid, and no matter how smoothly the pair may have progressed in private the professor finds some fault with the public demonstration. 'No, kneel on both knees—now hold her hand, it impresses her more-so,' and the old professor again kneels and goes through it all over again."

On May 12, the Chicago Tribune ran a photograph of Trueblood with the caption: "Trueblood has nearly worn out his trousers at the knees, showing young men how to kneel, and has strained his voice and eyes in efforts to show his pupils how to throw fire and passion into their appeals."

The story was an embarrassment for Trueblood and the university. In his memoirs, Handy recalled being summoned to Trueblood's office: "His desk was piled high with letters...and clippings...from around the country...and he also had a copy of the McCutcheon cartoon. (He) was taking all of this as ridicule, although I had publicized the story with sincere enthusiasm for a new advance in education of which I felt the University of Michigan should be proud." The faculty voted unanimously to suspend Handy for a year for "publishing false and injurious statements affecting the character of the work of one of the Professors." In addition to the suspension, Handy was charged as a "faker" in the press:

Henry J. Handy, the student-correspondent at the University of Michigan who sent a sensational story to the Chicago newspapers, relating how Professor Thomas C. Trueblood had a class in love-making, has been suspended for one year and the story has been branded as a 'fake.' Handy based the story on an incident that occurred during the rehearsal of a drama, when Professor Trueblood showed one of the students how to kneel to propose.

Shortly after the incident, Trueblood left for a trip giving dramatic readings on the West Coast. Handy went on to become a successful public relations man.

== Golf coach ==
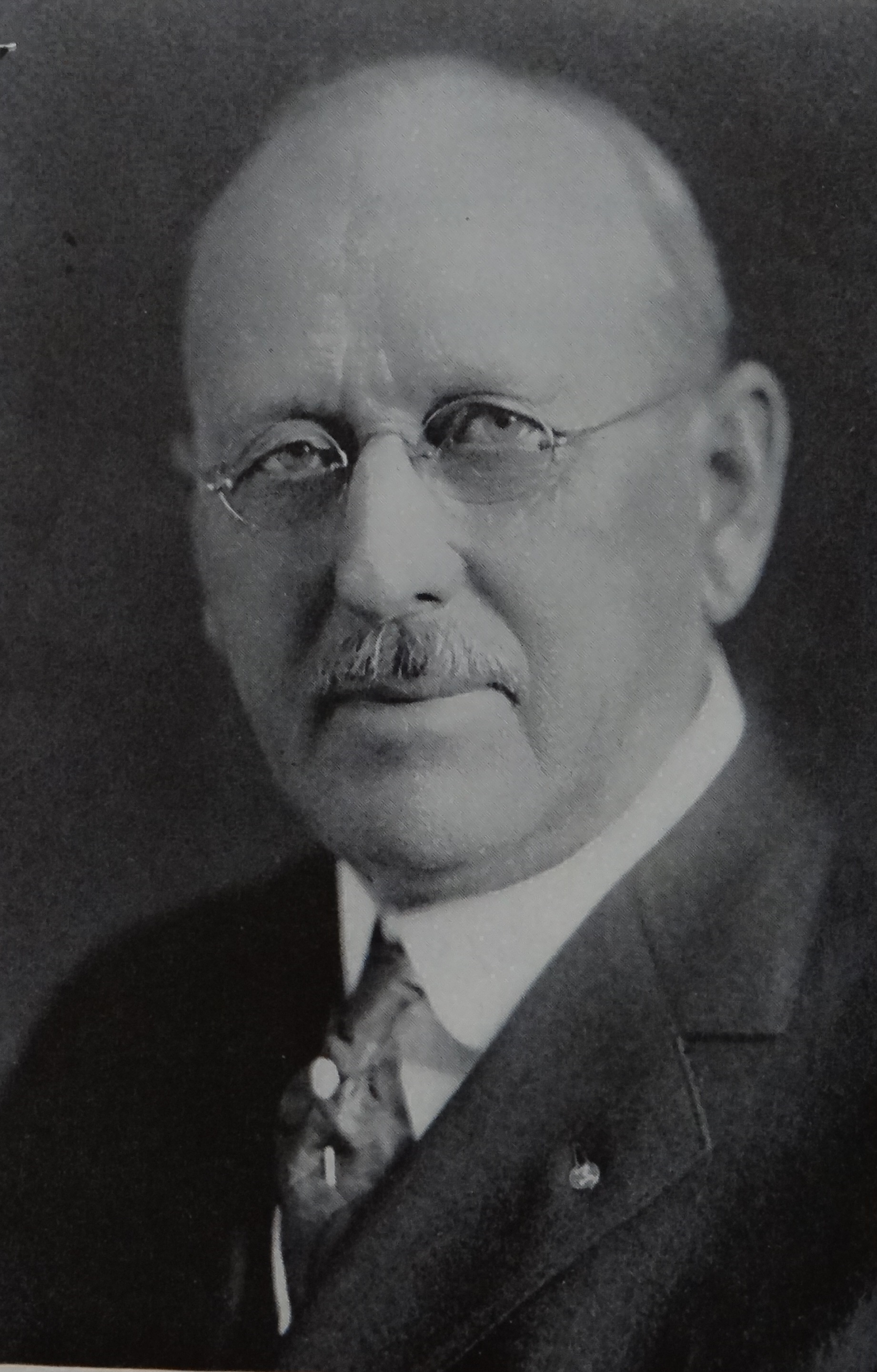
Trueblood from 1948 Michiganensian

Trueblood was the faculty tennis champion, but at age 40 his doctor told him to give up the game because it was too strenuous. He took up golf, and enjoyed success in that sport, too. "I took it up in August and in October I won the Ann Arbor Golf Club championship," he said. In 1901, Trueblood organized the first Michigan golf team. On October 24–25, 1902, Michigan defeated the University of Chicago 16–12 in "the first intercollegiate golf match held in the West."

In 1921, golf became a varsity sport, and Trueblood was the school's first official coach. In 1926, Trueblood retired as a professor emeritus at age 70. At that time, he turned his attention full-time to coaching. His coaching record at Michigan was 71–9–2. During his 15 official seasons as golf coach, his teams won two NCAA National Championships (1934–1935) and five Big Ten Conference championships (1932–1936), and were Big Ten runners-up eight times. He coached two NCAA individual champions, Johnny Fischer (1932) and Chuck Kocsis (1936). Trueblood continued as golf coach until he was 80, when athletic director Fielding H. Yost named him emeritus coach.

In 1932, Chuck Kocsis (the first golfer inducted into the University of Michigan Athletic Hall of Honor), enrolled at the university. When a promised alumni pledge to pay his expenses fell through, Trueblood agreed to make a loan (at five percent interest) so Kocsis could pay his tuition. The Wolverines with Kocsis won the NCAA championship twice. Kocsis recalled that the team often traveled to tournaments in Trueblood's car. "Professor Trueblood had a seven-passenger Buick," Kocsis said. "He designated me as the chauffeur. So if we had a golf match, we'd all get into the car and go to Chicago, or go to Ohio, wherever we were going to play." Another teammate recalled the trips in Trueblood's car: "It wasn't a very big Buick, as I recall. We rode with six guys. Chuck used to do most of the driving. I remember that trip down to Washington (for the 1935 national championship at Congressional, which Michigan won). We started in the morning and drove all the way down there. Professor Trueblood was a big guy, too." Trueblood took the team on a side trip to Mount Vernon, where one of the players accidentally bumped the shifter into gear and hit the accelerator as he exited Trueblood's car. The car lurched forward; the open door hit something and was torn off its hinges.

Ralph M. Cole, a member of the golf team of 1926–1928, later wrote of a humorous incident involving the septuagenarian Coach Trueblood. Cole recalled: "As golf coach he could add very little about the mechanics of the game. But he added one piece of advice which was very helpful when followed, and which he drilled into us at every practice session. It was: 'Up and out in two, boys.' As any golfer would know, it meant, when hitting a short approach shot, get it close enough to the pin to make the next putt. Now for the humorous part of that admonition. We had played Purdue in Lafayette on a Thursday and were to play Illinois on Friday. The Professor was to call us at 4:30 a.m. to catch a 5:30 train for Urbana. Well, he got confused on our room number and awakened a man who called the front desk and told the night clerk that there must be some nut calling at 4:30 a.m. and shouting, 'Up and out in two boys!' We did make the train, anyway."

A.H. Jolly Jr., captain of the 1933 golf team, noted: "Truby, as he was referred to when out of earshot, was still a most active and attentive coach. But the only club or clubs I recall seeing him handle in those days, was a Left-Handed Putter!"

== Death and honors ==
Trueblood died in Bradenton, Florida in 1951 at age 95. At the time, the Associated Press noted: "He pioneered the teaching of speech in the nation's colleges during his 42 years on the University of Michigan faculty." His brother, Professor Edwin P. Trueblood, also a speech professor at Earlham College, died earlier the same year. Thomas Trueblood's obituary reported that he "devised the famous college cheer 'The Locomotive.'" He devised the university's famous "locomotive" cheer in 1903 while returning to Ann Arbor on a train from a Big Ten football game. However, other sources indicate that the locomotive cheer began at Princeton in the 1890s.

Trueblood's papers are at the Bentley Historical Library in Ann Arbor. Trueblood has been the subject of two articles by Linda Robinson Walker in the University of Michigan alumni publication Michigan Today. Much of the factual information in this article is distilled from Walker's articles.

In 1921, students of Professor Trueblood honored him by establishing the Trueblood Fund. Today, the Trueblood Fellowship is open to students majoring in Screen Arts & Cultures. In 1981, Trueblood was inducted into the University of Michigan Athletic Hall of Honor as part of the fourth induction class. The Trueblood Theater was located in the Henry S. Frieze Building at the University of Michigan School of Music, Theater and Dance and named in Trueblood's honor. The Trueblood Theater closed its doors in 2006 when the Frieze Building was razed to make room for the North Quad Residential and Academic Complex.

A portrait of Trueblood painted in 1920 by Merton Grenhagen was originally hung first in Alumni Hall (now the Museum of Art) and then in the Theater Library in the Frieze Building. In 1998, the Trueblood portrait was hung at the University of Michigan Golf Course. At the time of the installation, the University Record noted: "Known as 'Chief' to his teaching associates and 'Trueby' to his students, Thomas C. Trueblood now resides among U-M's golf history."

== Books by Trueblood ==
- Robert I. Fulton and Thomas C. Trueblood, "Choice Readings From Standard and Popular Authors" (Ginn and Company 1890)
- Thomas C. Trueblood and Robert I. Fulton, "Practical Elements of Elocution: Designed as a Text-Book for the Guidance of Teachers and Students of Expression" (Ginn & Company Publishers/The Anthenaeum Press 1893)
- Robert I. Fulton and Thomas C. Trueblood, "Patriotic Eloquence Relating to the Spanish–American War and Its Issues" (Charles Scribner's Sons 1900)
- Robert I. Fulton, Thomas C. Trueblood, and Edwin P. Trueblood, "Standard Selections" (Ginn & Company 1907)
- Thomas C. Trueblood, William G. Caskey, and Henry E. Gordon, "Winning Speeches in the Contests of the Northern Oratorical League" (American Book Company 1909)
- Robert I. Fulton, Thomas C. Trueblood, "Essentials of Public Speaking for Secondary Schools" (Ginn & Company 1910)
- Robert Irving Fulton and Thomas Clarkson Trueblood, "British and American Eloquence" (Ginn and Company 1912)
- Robert I. Fulton and Thomas C. Trueblood, "Choice Readings from Standard and Popular Authors Embracing a Complete Classification of Selections, a Comprehensive Diagram of the Principles of Vocal Expression, and Indexes to the Choicest Readings from Shakespeare, The Bible, and Hymn-Books" (Ginn & Company 1912)

== See also ==
- University of Michigan Athletic Hall of Honor
