= Mindy Gehrs =

American swimmer

Personal information
- Born: Oak Ridge, Tennessee, United States

Sport
- Sport: Swimming
- Strokes: Medley, butterfly
- Club: Michigan Wolverines

Melinda Anne "Mindy" Gehrs is a former All-American swimmer who was inducted into the University of Michigan Athletic Hall of Honor in January 2009.

== Youth in Oak Ridge, Tennessee ==
A native of Oak Ridge, Tennessee, Gehrs is the daughter of Dr. and Mrs. Carl and Judi Gehrs. She began swimming at age seven and was a member of two junior national teams and two national teams. She was also a four-time Tennessee state champion and swam for both Oak Ridge High School and the Atomic City Aquatic Club (so named because Gehrs' hometown of Oak Ridge was a base for the Manhattan Project, the operation that developed the atomic bomb). In 1998, Gehrs was inducted into the Oak Ridge Sports Hall of Fame. At the time of her selection, The Oak Ridger called Gehrs "the best swimmer to ever part the waters of the Atomic City."

== University of Michigan ==
Competing for Michigan from 1990 to 1993, she received 11 All-American honors in five events and won 13 Big Ten championships and the 1993 NCAA championship in the 400-meter individual medley. In 1992, Gehrs was named the Big Ten Women's Swimmer of the Year and received the Big Ten High Point Swimmer award after scoring a perfect 60 points with first-place finishes in: (a) the 200-meter individual medley with a time of 2:00.85, (b) the 400-meter individual medley with a time of 4:14.39, and (c) the 200-meter butterfly with a time of 1:59.52. All three of her times were University of Michigan school records, and her time in the 200-meter individual medley was also a Big Ten Conference record. At the end of the 1992 swim season, Gehrs told a Tennessee newspaper, "I just had a fantastic year. I was excited about the whole team. I got three individual bests - finally - and our relays were really good too." In 1993, she was named the NCAA Woman of the Year. Gehrs also received honors for her academic accomplishments, including three Academic All-Big Ten awards and the 1993 Big Ten Conference Medal of Honor for combined excellence in academics and athletics.

In January 2009, she was inducted into the University of Michigan Athletic Hall of Honor.

== Medical career and triathlete ==
In 1998, Gehrs received her medical degree from the University of Alabama School of Medicine in Birmingham, Alabama. She also competed in triathlons and won the 1995 FS Fitness Systems Knoxville Lock Triathlon. In December 2002, Gehrs married Heath William Beaver at the Trinity United Methodist Church of Hartford City, Indiana. As of 2009, Gehrs is a practicing physician in Longmont, Colorado, specializing in the field of rehabilitation medicine. She treats patients with musculoskeletal, neuromuscular and spine problems and is a member of the American Academy of Physical Medicine and Rehabilitation.

== See also ==
- University of Michigan Athletic Hall of Honor
