= Henry O'Neill (disambiguation) =

Henry O'Neill (1891–1961) was an American film actor.

Henry O'Neill may also refer to:

- Henry O'Neill (d. 1347), king of Tyrone
- Henry O'Neill (illustrator) (1798–1880), Irish artist and antiquarian
- Henry O'Neill, 2nd Baron Dungannon, held title Baron Dungannon
- Sir Henry O'Neill, 3rd Baronet (c. 1674–1759) of the O'Neill baronets
- Sir Henry O'Neill, 1st Baronet (1625-c. 1680) of the O'Neill baronets
- Henry E. O'Neill (1848–1925), British explorer of Central Africa
- Henry MacShane O'Neill (died 1622), leader of the MacShane (not to be confused with MacShane's of Loughinsholin)
  - Sir Henry Og MacShane, son of Henry MacShane O'Neill; see Henry MacShane O'Neill § Known children and grandchildren
- Henry O'Neill (bishop) (1843–1915), Irish bishop of Dromore
- Henry O'Neill (soldier) (c. 1586–1610), Irish-born soldier
- Henry O'Neill (rugby union), Irish international rugby union player

== See also ==
- Harry O'Neill (disambiguation)
- Henry O'Neil (disambiguation)
- Henrique O'Neill, 1st Viscount of Santa Mónica (1823–1889), Portuguese writer and politician
- Henry O'Neal, in Flirtation Walk
