= Chuck Kocsis =

Amateur golfer (1913–2006)

Charles R. Kocsis (January 27, 1913 – May 30, 2006) was an American amateur golfer.

== Early life ==
Kocsis was introduced to the game as a caddie at the Phoenix Country Club, which is now Rogell Municipal Golf Course. One of fourteen children, he grew up in the Old Redford area of Detroit. Attended Redford High and was victorious at the city and state championship levels.

== Golf career ==
Kocsis was the winner of six Michigan Match Play Amateurs and six Michigan Medal Play Amateurs, three Michigan Opens (1931, 1945, 1946), individual intercollegiate champion, member of three U.S. Walker Cup teams, member of two NCAA Championship teams at the University of Michigan, low amateur in the Masters, low amateur in two U.S. Opens, runner-up at the 1956 U.S. Amateur, and runner-up at the 1937 Western Amateur.

Kocsis also found success on the senior level winning the US National Open Senior Championship in 1969, 1970, and 1979. Kocsis played in the International Seniors Championship five times and won four - 1970, 1973, 1980, and 1988. He set the tournament record at Gleneagles in 1970 with a 13 under par total of 271. During his time at the University of Michigan, Kocsis became a member of the Lambda Chi Alpha fraternity.

== Awards and honors ==
- The Golf Association of Michigan voted Kocsis the Michigan amateur golfer of the century.
- Kocsis was a member of the first class elected into the Michigan Golf Hall of Fame.

== Tournament wins ==
this list may be incomplete

- 1930 Michigan Amateur
- 1931 Michigan Open
- 1933 Michigan Amateur
- 1934 Michigan Amateur
- 1936 NCAA Championship
- 1937 Michigan Amateur
- 1945 Michigan Open
- 1946 Michigan Open
- 1948 Michigan Amateur
- 1951 Michigan Amateur
- 1955 Michigan Amateur Medal Play
- 1958 Michigan Amateur Medal Play
- 1959 Michigan Amateur Medal Play
- 1960 Dogwood Invitational, Michigan Amateur Medal Play
- 1961 Michigan Amateur Medal Play
- 1962 Michigan Amateur Medal Play

== Results in major championships ==
| Tournament | 1930 | 1931 | 1932 | 1933 | 1934 | 1935 | 1936 | 1937 | 1938 | 1939 |
|---|---|---|---|---|---|---|---|---|---|---|
| Masters Tournament | NYF | NYF | NYF | NYF | | | | 35 | T22 | |
| U.S. Open | | | | | CUT | | T14 LA | T10 | | |
| U.S. Amateur | R16 | | | | R64 | QF | | R16 | | |
| The Amateur Championship | | | | | | | | | R16 | |

| Tournament | 1940 | 1941 | 1942 | 1943 | 1944 | 1945 | 1946 | 1947 | 1948 | 1949 |
|---|---|---|---|---|---|---|---|---|---|---|
| Masters Tournament | T44 | | | NT | NT | NT | | | | |
| U.S. Open | | CUT | NT | NT | NT | NT | | | | CUT |
| U.S. Amateur | | | NT | NT | NT | NT | R32 | R16 | R16 | |
| The Amateur Championship | NT | NT | NT | NT | NT | NT | | | | |

| Tournament | 1950 | 1951 | 1952 | 1953 | 1954 | 1955 | 1956 | 1957 | 1958 | 1959 |
|---|---|---|---|---|---|---|---|---|---|---|
| Masters Tournament | T35 | | T14 LA | T45 | | | | CUT | CUT | T22 |
| U.S. Open | | T16 LA | CUT | | | | | T32 | | |
| U.S. Amateur | | | R128 | | | | 2 | R16 | QF | |
| The Amateur Championship | | | | | | | | | | |

| Tournament | 1960 | 1961 | 1962 | 1963 | 1964 | 1965 | 1966 | 1967 | 1968 | 1969 |
|---|---|---|---|---|---|---|---|---|---|---|
| Masters Tournament | T34 | CUT | | | | | | | | |
| U.S. Open | CUT | | | | | | | | | |
| U.S. Amateur | | R128 | | R64 | R32 | – | – | – | – | – |
| The Amateur Championship | | | | | | | | | | |

| Tournament | 1970 | 1971 | 1972 | 1973 |
|---|---|---|---|---|
| Masters Tournament | | | | |
| U.S. Open | | | | |

Note: Kocsis never played in The Open Championship nor the PGA Championship.

Top 10
Did not play

LA = low amateur
NYF = tournament not yet founded
NT = no tournament
CUT = missed the half-way cut
R128, R64, R32, R16, QF, SF = round in which player lost in match play
"T" indicates a tie for a place

Sources: U.S. Open and U.S. Amateur, 1938 Amateur Championship

== U.S. national team appearances ==
Amateur

- Walker Cup: 1938, 1949 (winners), 1957 (winners)

== See also ==
- University of Michigan Athletic Hall of Honor
- Kupelian, Vartan. Forever Scratch:Chuck Kocsis-An Amateur for the Ages. Ann Arbor Media Group, 2007.
