= Francie Kraker Goodridge =

American track and field athlete and coach

Francea ("Francie") Norma Kraker Goodridge (born February 9, 1947 in Ann Arbor, Michigan) is a former women's track and field athlete and coach from the United States. She set a world record in the 600-yard indoor event and was the first Michigan-born woman to win a place on the U.S. Olympic team (Mexico City in 1968 and Munich in 1972). She later coached women's track at the University of Michigan, Wake Forest University and the University of Wisconsin–Milwaukee, where she was also the Coordinator of Women's Athletics. She has been inducted into the University of Michigan Athletic Hall of Honor, the University of Michigan Women's Track and Field Hall of Fame and the Michigan Women's Hall of Fame.

== Early years ==
Kraker Goodridge was the middle of three daughters of Dr. Ralph and Norma Kraker. She describes herself as having been a "tomboy." She went to sporting events with her father who helped raise money for the high school gymnasium, a facility that girls were not allowed to use. She was the first girl to train for track at Slauson Junior High School in Ann Arbor, Michigan. She noted, "When I was in junior high I wanted a letter jacket, but they were just for boys teams and cheerleaders. I never ran for a school team in my career." In 1960, when she was thirteen, she caught the eye of former runner Kenneth "Red" Simmons and his wife Betty, a junior high physical education teacher. "Red and Betty made me their hobby," Goodridge recalled. "He was a firm believer in overall training for strength and flexibility, and he trained me just the way he would have trained a boy, including lifting weights." About a year later, the Simmonses founded the Michigammes, an all-girl track and field club. Kraker recalled that in the 1960s girls were still discouraged from participating in sports because it was said to be "bad for their internal organs." Simmons put Kraker through a vigorous weight training program: "He trained me like a man." When President Kennedy came out with a national fitness test that included a 600-yard run; Kraker ran the distance and beat the boys.

== Track and field competitor ==
Because there was no women's track team at the University of Michigan in the pre-Title IX era, Kraker continued running for the Michigammes while attending school there. There were no athletic scholarships for women, and Kraker worked as a waitress to pay expenses. "I made good money and it was fun. I had flexible hours so I could train and go to meets." She noted: "Things are better now. There's equality and that's good. But sometimes when you're given everything, you have less motivation." As a freshman at Michigan, Kraker was named to the U.S. National team earning top-ten world ranking for the 800 meters in 1966. She set a national record for the half-mile indoor in 1967 and a world record for the indoor 600-yard event at Madison Square Garden. After a year of setbacks, including severe tendinitis, an appendectomy, and a disastrous Olympic Trials where she finished fourth, Kraker made the U.S. Olympic team in a high-altitude race when injured 400 meter champion Jarvis Scott opted out of the 800 to concentrate on her specialty. She was the first native-born Michigan woman to win a place on the U.S. Olympic track team. In Mexico City, Kraker finished fifth in her preliminary heat in a time of 2:07.3. In 1970, Kraker won the national indoor championship for the half-mile. She qualified for the Olympics again in 1972, this time in the inaugural 1500 meter race for women. Kraker's 1500 meter time of 4:12.76 in the Munich semifinals was the second-fastest all-time performance by an American woman, and she retained that position for three more years.

== Track and field coach ==
Kraker began her coaching career while still in college, as a volunteer coach for the first girls' interscholastic track and field teams at Huron High School and Clague Junior High. In 1975, at the University of Wisconsin–Milwaukee, she was among the first Division I university female administrators appointed after the passage of Title IX. She later returned to Ann Arbor as admissions director and coach at Greenhills School. She took over as women's track coach at U-M in 1981, a job she held for three years. While at Michigan her cross-country and track and field teams won the program's first NCAA Regional Cross Country Championship and posted the first NCAA Top Ten National finish with an eighth place in 1982, going on to win the first Big Ten Championship in track and field in 1983. In 1984, Kraker and husband, John Goodridge, next took over the women's and men's track teams at Wake Forest University. The North Carolina school was known for basketball and golf, but not track. The Goodridges lifted Wake Forest's men's and women's programs to national status and spent 15 distinguished years there.

== Later years ==
In 1999, the Goodridges returned to Ann Arbor, where John Goodridge coached Athletics America, a post-collegiate Olympic development club. Kraker Goodridge accepted a job as a counselor in the U-M Undergraduate Admissions Office. In a 2002 interview, Kraker Goodridge said: "I really enjoy representing the University, and my background in athletics, with years of experience in recruiting, going on school visits and making speeches, is a big help when I'm advising potential students, their families, and guidance counselors," she says. She added: "Athletically, I jog, bike, ski cross-country and kayak. I'm working to stay ahead of the aging process."

== Awards and honors ==
Francie has received numerous awards and honors for her achievements. In 1994, she was inducted into the University of Michigan Athletic Hall of Honor, the fourth woman so honored. And in 1995, she was the second person inducted into the Michigan Women's Track and Field Hall of Fame, following her mentor Red Simmons. In 2001, she was inducted into the Michigan Women's Hall of Fame, a group that includes 170 members as diverse as civil rights leader Rosa Parks, former First Lady Betty Ford, and entertainers Lily Tomlin and Aretha Franklin. Kraker is one of only two athletes inducted into the Michigan Women's Hall of Fame.

== See also ==
- University of Michigan Athletic Hall of Honor
