= William B. "Buck" Giles =

American lawyer

William "Buck" Giles
- Giles, c. 1925
- Born: May 7, 1903; Blissfield, Michigan, United States
- Died: April 15, 1985; Bloomfield Hills, Michigan, United States
- Education: University of Michigan
- Known for: Baseball player and attorney

William Bliss "Buck" Giles (May 7, 1903 – April 15, 1985) was an American baseball player and attorney. He played second base for the Michigan Wolverines baseball team in 1924 and 1925. In 1925, he became the first Michigan baseball player to win the Big Ten Conference Medal of Honor. He was inducted into the University of Michigan Athletic Hall of Honor in 1980.

== University of Michigan ==
A native of Blissfield, Michigan, Giles attended the University of Michigan where he played second base for the Michigan Wolverines baseball team from 1923 to 1925. He was Michigan's leadoff hitter in 1924 and 1925, and he helped lead the team to the Big Ten Conference championship in 1924. In April 1925, he became the first Michigan baseball player to win the Big Ten Conference Medal of Honor.

Gile received his undergraduate degree from Michigan in 1924, remained at Michigan for law school, and received his law degree in 1927. He had an opportunity to play professional baseball but opted instead to practice law.

In October 1956, longtime Michigan baseball coach Ray Fisher selected Giles as a second baseman for his all-time Michigan baseball team. In 1980, Giles was inducted into the University of Michigan Athletic Hall of Honor as part of the third induction class. He was the fourth Michigan baseball player (following Bill Freehan, Bennie Oosterbaan, and George Sisler) to be inducted into the Hall of Honor.

== Later years ==
After leaving Michigan, Giles practiced corporate and probate law in Detroit. He was also a director of the Transportation Advertising Co. and Burton Abstract & Title Co., an associate professor of law at the Detroit College of Law.

Giles was married. He and his wife, Margaret, had two daughters: Gail and Greta. Gail died in 1953 at age 17, after a short illness, at the family home in Detroit. He later served as counsel for Michigan Sports Hall of Fame. In 1971, he was elected as the president of the University of Michigan's graduate "M" Club. Giles died in April 1985 at Bloomfield Hills, Michigan.

Giles retired from his law practice in 1978. He died in April 1985 at his home in Bloomfield Hills, Michigan.

== See also ==
- University of Michigan Athletic Hall of Honor
