= Bud Chamberlain =

- Chamberlain, 1942

Personal information
- Citizenship: United States
- Born: Benjamin Francis Chamberlain; May 24, 1920
- Died: August 24, 2012 (aged 92)

Sport
- Sport: Baseball
- College team: Michigan Wolverines

Benjamin Francis "Bud" Chamberlain (May 24, 1920 – August 24, 2012) was an American baseball player and realtor. He played baseball for the University of Michigan from 1939 to 1942. He led the Wolverines to consecutive Big Ten Conference baseball championships in 1941 and 1942 and won the Conference batting title in 1942. In 1948, he founded Chamberlain Realtors in Oakland County, Michigan. He was inducted into the University of Michigan Athletic Hall of Honor in 1982.

== Early years ==
Chamberlain was born in 1920 in Clarkston, Michigan. He attended Royal Oak High School where he played football, baseball, and basketball. He graduated from there in 1938.

== University of Michigan ==
Chamberlain enrolled at the University of Michigan. He was a third baseman for the Michigan Wolverines baseball team from 1938 to 1942. He won the Big Ten Conference batting championship in 1942 with a .352 batting average. Chamberlain's career highlights include the following:

- On April 12, 1941, Chamberlain led the Wolverines to a 13–5 victory over the University of Maryland with two triples. He hit the first triple with the bases loaded in the first inning.
- In June 1941, the Michigan Wolverines won the Big Ten Conference baseball championship with a 10–2 record in conference games. The championship was Michigan's second since 1929. The team would repeat as Big Ten champions in 1942.
- On April 25, 1942, Chamberlain compiled six RBI's in the first inning of a game against Purdue. He hit a double with the bases loaded in his first at bat and followed with a three-run home run later in the inning. The Wolverines scored a total of 11 runs in the inning.
- On April 27, 1942, Chamberlain hit a home run to help lead the Wolverines to a victory over Michigan Normal (now known as Eastern Michigan University).
- In June 1942, the Wolverines tied with Iowa for the Big Ten baseball championship. Chamberlain led the conference in both bases and RBIs.

In 1956, Ray Fisher, who had been the head baseball coach at Michigan since 1921, selected Chamberlain as the third baseman on his all-time Michigan baseball team.

Chamberlain was inducted into the University of Michigan Athletic Hall of Honor in 1982. He is one of 15 individuals, along with Jim Abbott, Steve Boros, Barry Larkin, Branch Rickey, and George Sisler, to be inducted into the university's Hall of Honor principally for their contributions to the baseball team. In 1973, the mayor of Royal Oak proclaimed "B.F. Chamberlain Day," and in 1994, the State of Michigan issued a special tribute to him for his active involvement in state and national issues. In 1997 he was also inducted into the Royal Oak High School Hall of Fame.

== Military service and professional career ==
During World War II, Chamberlain enlisted in the U.S. Navy, serving for five years. He received a Bronze Star for his wartime service. After being discharged from the Navy, Chamberlain returned to Royal Oak, Michigan. He founded Chamberlain Realtors in 1948.

Chamberlain died in 2012 at age 92.

== See also ==
- University of Michigan Athletic Hall of Honor
