= Marie Hartwig =

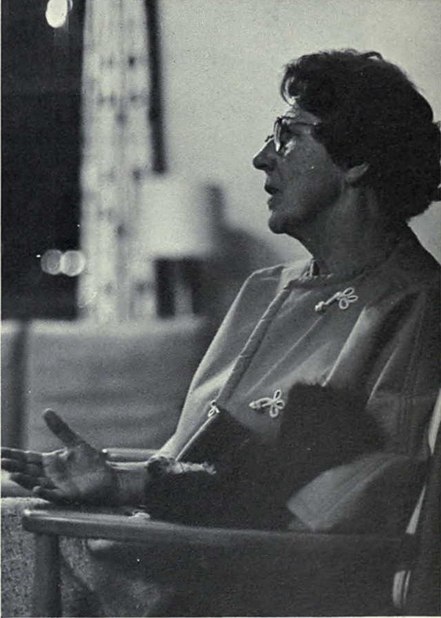
Hartwig from the 1967 Michiganensian

Marie Dorothy Hartwig (August 1, 1906 – December 31, 2001), known by the nickname "Pete", was an American professor of physical education at the University of Michigan, the university's first associate director of athletics for women, and a lifelong advocate for education, women's sports, and intercollegiate athletics. She was the second woman inducted into the University of Michigan Athletic Hall of Honor.

== Early years ==
Hartwig was born in East Orange, New Jersey, but moved with her family to Detroit, Michigan where she graduated from Northwestern High School in 1925. She enrolled at the University of Michigan and graduated in 1929 with a degree in literature. Her initial ambition was to become a "cultured" private secretary working in the highest cultural circles.

== Women's athletics at Michigan ==
When the Michigan League building opened at Michigan, Hartwig worked there as a secretary. Dr. Margaret Bell, the head of women's physical education, soffered Hartwig a job as a teaching fellow to work in intramurals and with the Women's Athletic Association (WAA). Hartwig earned her bachelor's degree in education in 1932 and a master's degree in physical education in 1938. Hartwig began her teaching career at Michigan in 1930. By the mid-1930s, she was in charge of the intramural/recreational sports program for women, and she had developed a national reputation as a leader in intramural recreation and an advocate for women's sports. Hartwig also served as the national secretary-treasurer of the Athletic Federation of College Women (AFCW) from 1939 to 1947, on the National Basketball Committee from 1944 to 1950 and on the Board of Governors of Residence Halls from 1959 to 1969.

Hartwig assumed leadership of the Department of Physical Education for women's recreational programs upon Margaret Bell's retirement in 1957. During Hartwig's tenure, student interest in the WAA waned, and there was increased pressure from students and faculty to allow greater extramural competition.

Hartwig was for many years an instructor and lecturer in physical education at Michigan's School of Education. In 1968, she was promoted to associate professor, and she became a full professor in 1969. She was acting director of physical education for women from 1968 to 1970, when the men's and women's departments were merged. When Michigan began giving women's sports equal treatment in 1973 or 1974 with the passage of Title IX, Hartwig became the first associate director of athletics for women, a position she held until she retired in 1976. Hartwig noted: "The first program there listed six sports – swimming, volleyball, tennis, field hockey, synchronized swimming and basketball. . . . We've had winning tennis and swim teams right along; won the Big Ten swim title in 1974." She was granted professor emeritus status in June 1977. Hartwig recalled former Michigan athletic director Fielding H. Yost advocating "athletics for all," and Hartwig helped make that phrase a reality at Michigan.

== Interlochen National Music Camp ==
Hartwig was also the director of the CIT (Counselor-in-Training) program at the National Music Camp at Interlochen Center for the Arts. She began working at Interlochen under director Joe Maddy, establishing the counselor training course. From 1944 to 1982, she trained more than 1,000 young men and women to "tend" to the elementary and junior high school boys and girls attending Interlochen. Hartwig noted of the counseling work: "It's demanding work, requires close attention, but it's fulfilling, adds to a person's lifetime sense of responsibility – which sense is shown by their being in the course." She was also the co-author of the Camp Counselor Training Workbook, the Children ARE Human series, and Camping Leadership.

== Awards and honors ==
Hartwig received numerous awards and honors for her contributions to the University of Michigan and women's athletics, including the following:

- Each year, the University of Michigan presents the Marie Hartwig Award to the outstanding junior woman varsity athlete.
- The alumni association also established a Marie Hartwig endowed professorship. The Marie Hartwig Collegiate Professorship was established to benefit a faculty position within Physical Education and is the second endowed professorship within Kinesiology.
- In 1984, athletic director Don Canham renamed one of the buildings in the athletic campus the Marie D. Hartwig Building in her honor. The building today houses the Wolverine athletic ticket department, media relations office, marketing and promotions, and information technology.
- In 1989, she was the second woman inducted into the University of Michigan Athletic Hall of Honor. (Micki King was the first woman inducted.)
- In 1989, Hartwig also received the Distinguished Alumni Service Award, which is presented annually, and recognizes alumni who have distinguished themselves "by reason of services performed on behalf of the University of Michigan, or in connection with its organized alumni activities." The Distinguished Alumni Service Award is the highest honor the Alumni Association can bestow upon an alumna/us on behalf of the University.
- She received the Applause Award, presented to an outstanding faculty or staff member at the Interlochen National Music Camp in recognition of exceptional service and concern for Interlochen during their employment.

== The Marie D. Hartwig Papers ==
The Marie D. Hartwig Papers are kept at the University of Michigan's Bentley Historical Library. The papers cover Hartwig's work as an instructor and professor of physical education and as the first director of women's athletics at Michigan. The papers also document the history of physical education and recreational sports for women and the development of women's varsity athletics at the university as well as Hartwig's involvement in various professional associations and her work with recreation programs at Interlochen.
