= Harold O'Neil =

American psychologist

Dr. Harold F. O'Neil
- Education: Florida State University
- Known for: Professor at the University of Southern California

Harold O'Neil is an American psychologist. He ran computer-assisted instruction laboratories at Florida State University and the University of Texas at Austin before he joined the Defense Advanced Research Projects Agency (DARPA), where he ran a program on computer-based learning, including PLATO IV. From 1978 to 1985, O'Neil served in various roles at the US Army Research Institute for Behavioral and Social Sciences (ARI), including as Director of the Training Research Laboratory. Since the mid-1980s, O'Neil has worked as a professor of educational psychology and technology at the University of Southern California (USC).

== Education ==
O'Neil obtained bachelors degree in experimental psychology from Florida State University in the late 1960s and conducted research in its computer-assisted instruction laboratory.

== Career ==
O'Neil moved to the University of Texas at Austin, where he co-directed its computer-assisted instruction lab and attained tenure. In 1975, O'Neil was recruited to join the Defense Advanced Research Projects Agency (DARPA), where he ran a program on computer-based learning, including PLATO IV (the state-of-the-art computer-assisted instruction system with "600 terminals online at the same time").

=== US Army civilian executive ===
From 1978 to 1985, O'Neil served in various roles at the US Army Research Institute for Behavioral and Social Sciences (ARI). As Director of the Training Research Laboratory, he managed an in-house staff of 200 and contract R&D program. He was a member of the senior executive service (less than .01% of U.S. Army civilian personnel held this status). His research program emphasized technology development and included interactive technologies, simulation-based training systems, and intelligent tutoring systems as well as the Job Skills Education Program, a computer-based basic skills program. His emphasis was on R&D that could be implemented in Army education and training.

=== USC ===
In the mid-1980s, O'Neil left government service and assumed a position as full professor of educational psychology and technology in the Rossier School of Education at the University of Southern California. At USC, he has been active in the development of technology-based student assessment approaches involving public schools through a research relationship with UCLA/CRESST. His work has emphasized computer-based assessment of workforce readiness in the area of team skills and collaborative problem-solving skills. He designed and managed a major study of motivation on the Third International Mathematics and Science Study (TIMSS), conducted for the National Center for Education Statistics (NCES). He also co-authored articles on assessment and equity.

With his graduate students at USC, O'Neil conducts research on the development of both trait and state measures of effort, anxiety, self-efficacy, and metacognition. He directs USC dissertations involving data collection in South Korea, Malaysia and Taiwan. His USC activities also involved multimedia strategic planning (e.g., distance learning) and assessment of faculty and organizational productivity, as well as evaluation of games. His current interests involve the teaching and assessment of self-regulation skills (including self and peer assessment), use of games for training, and the impact of motivation on testing.

In the training research area, he continues his interests in high technology with consulting relationships with the Institute for Defense Analyses in the area of evaluation and technology planning.

== Affiliations ==
O'Neil was a member of the Army Science Board (1994–2001). He was a member of the Defense Science Board Task Force on Training for Future Conflicts. He is a Fellow of the American Psychological Association and a Certified Performance Technologist (CPT).

== Author ==
O'Neil has written numerous articles, chapters, professional papers, and reports. He has also co-edited four books:

- What Works in Distance Learning: Guidelines (2005)
- Web-Based Learning: Theory, Research, and Practice (2006)
- Assessment of Problem Solving Using Simulations (2008) and
- Computer Games and Team and Adult Learning (2008).
