= Harry O'Neill (footballer, born 1894) =

English footballer

Personal information
- Full name: Harold O'Neill
- Date of birth: 15 November 1894
- Place of birth: Newcastle, England
- Date of death: 1971 (aged 76–77)
- Height: 5 ft 11 in (1.80 m)
- Position: Full back

Senior career*
Years	Team	Apps	(Gls)
- Wallsend
1919–1921	Sheffield Wednesday	49	(0)
1921–1923	Bristol Rovers	17	(0)
1923–1928	Swindon Town	26	(1)
- * Club domestic league appearances and goals

Harold O'Neill (15 November 1894 – 1971) was an English professional footballer who played as a full back. He played in the Football League for Sheffield Wednesday, Bristol Rovers and Swindon Town.
