= Ray Fisher (baseball) =

American baseball player (1887–1982)

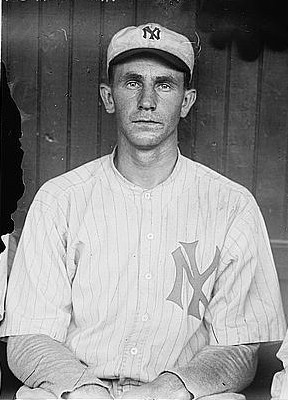
- Fisher in 1911
- Pitcher
- Born: October 4, 1887; Middlebury, Vermont, U.S.
- Died: November 3, 1982 (aged 95); Ann Arbor, Michigan, U.S.
- Batted: Right Threw: Right

MLB debut
- July 2, 1910, for the New York Highlanders

Last MLB appearance
- October 2, 1920, for the Cincinnati Reds

MLB statistics
- Win–loss record: 100–94
- Earned run average: 2.82
- Strikeouts: 680
- Stats at Baseball Reference

Teams
- New York Highlanders / Yankees (1910–1917); Cincinnati Reds (1919–1920)

Career highlights and awards
- World Series champion (1919)

Ray Lyle Fisher (October 4, 1887 – November 3, 1982) was an American professional baseball pitcher and college coach. He pitched all or part of ten seasons in Major League Baseball. His debut game took place on July 2, 1910. His final game took place on October 2, 1920. During his early professional career he played for the New York Yankees and Cincinnati Reds.

From 1921 to 1958, he coached the University of Michigan Wolverines baseball team, and served as assistant coach for basketball and football. In 1929 and 1932 he took the baseball team to Japan for a month each time at the invitation of Meiji University, where they played several games against Japanese university teams around the nation.

== Early life ==
Nicknamed "Pick" (short for the freshwater fish pickerel), Fisher was an all-around athlete who played football, basketball, baseball, and competed in track events, though his father permitted sports only if the farm work was done. He played on Vermont's 1904 State Championship football team and was offered multiple college scholarships in football, but his real love was baseball. He stayed on in his hometown, attending Middlebury College.

== Professional career ==
=== Semi-pro and minor leagues ===
After stellar performances on the college mound, he was offered a position pitching with a semi-pro team in Valleyfield, Quebec in the summer of 1907. In 1908 and 1909 he pitched in the minor leagues for Hartford in the Connecticut League, going 12–1 in his first partial season (batting .304) and 25–4 the following year with 243 strikeouts. Because of his contract with Hartford, Fisher was no longer eligible to play on the Middlebury team, but he served as Middlebury's coach in 1910 during his senior year. Fisher jumped at the first major league opportunity to come his way, thinking it might be the only offer he would get, and his contract was sold to the New York Highlanders (Yankees). He soon learned, however, that the New York Giants and Boston Red Sox were also interested in signing him. He reported to the Highlanders in 1910 following his graduation from Middlebury, bringing along—to the amusement of his new teammates—his homemade bat from off the farm.

=== New York Yankees ===
Dubbed the "Vermont Schoolmaster" because he taught Latin at Newton Academy in New Jersey during his first offseason, Fisher pitched for New York from 1910 to 1917, spending 1918 in the Army stationed at Fort Slocum off New Rochelle. As a rookie, the newspapers were frequently comparing Fisher to Highlander's spitball pitcher Jack Chesbro, and early in his tenure with the Yankees Fisher was also cited by Ty Cobb and Nap Lajoie as one of the 12 best pitchers in the American League, both players also listing Ed Walsh, Russ Ford, Walter Johnson and Smoky Joe Wood. In October 1910, at the end of his rookie season, Fisher pitched against Christy Mathewson in game five of the New York Inter-League Series, a precursor to the Subway Series, losing to Mathewson 5-1. His earned run average ranked fifth in the league in 1915. Fisher was known for his stamina as a pitcher, considered a "workhorse" for the Yankees, but the following year, 1916, a bout of pleurisy resulted in crippling his effectiveness, and causing him to miss about a month of the season. (Doctors later thought that Fisher had probably had tuberculosis.) In the first game after his return, however, Fisher pitched a shutout against Walter Johnson. From 1911 to 1915, during the offseason, Fisher was also employed as Middlebury College's first "Physical Director".

In 1915 he was hired as athletic director at Sewanee: The University of the South, in which capacity he coached the baseball and basketball teams, and assisted with the football team. However, he soon had to resign due to the prolonged illness of his mother.

=== Cincinnati Reds ===
About the time of his discharge from the Army, Fisher was selected off waivers by the Cincinnati Reds, taking a $3,100 cut in pay from his $6,700 with the Yankees. The Yankees may have let Fisher go due to the effects of his pleurisy, but his year in the Army had given him time to build up his strength. Pat Moran, Fisher's manager at Cincinnati noted that, "Fisher's speed is fine, his curves are all that could be desired. But, beyond all is his headwork. Fisher knows a lot of baseball, far more than the average pitcher." Fisher pitched for the Reds in 1919 and 1920. He went 14–5 in 1919 and pitched Game 3 in the infamous 1919 World Series, a game in which the Reds were shut out by Chicago's Dickie Kerr. In the spring of 1920 the American and National Leagues agreed to outlaw use of the spitball, though 22 spitball pitchers were exempted from the ban for the season. The following year a permanent ban went into effect, with 17 pitchers "grandfathered" for the remainder of their pitching careers. Though he had largely discontinued use of the spitter by 1914, Fisher was one of those allowed to continue to use the pitch.

=== "Lifetime" ban ===
Fisher is one of the few players to be re-instated into professional baseball during their lifespan after being banned for life. Prior to the 1921 season, the Reds offered him a contract in which his salary was $1,000 less than that of the previous season. After making his objections known in a letter to Reds president August Herrmann, Fisher signed the contract. Before the season began, however, Fisher learned that the position of head baseball coach had again become available at the University of Michigan, a position for which he had belatedly applied the previous year on the recommendation of Branch Rickey. Fisher requested, and was apparently given by manager Pat Moran, permission to go and look into the job.

When he was offered the position at Michigan, the Reds' management tried to induce Fisher to remain with the team by offering to restore the $1,000 cut from the previous year's contract. Fisher thought the Michigan position held greater long-term promise and accepted the job, believing that he would be given his release from Cincinnati or placed on the list of voluntarily retired players (both of which were subsequently reported in the local papers).

Part way into Michigan's playing season, other teams began contacting Fisher inquiring as to his availability to pitch and coach during the summer, Rickey's St. Louis Cardinals among them. Fisher contacted the Reds for clarification on his status, noting that he realized they had first call on his services. He learned that he was being placed on the list of those ineligible to play, the Reds citing his having given them only seven days notice, rather than the required ten, prior to leaving the club. Fisher appealed to the commissioner of baseball, Kenesaw Mountain Landis, and the commissioner promised to look into the matter.

After obtaining the Reds' version of the negotiations, the commissioner upheld the Reds' position and banned Fisher for leaving the team after having signed a contract. Fisher ended his major league career with a 100–94 record and a 2.82 earned run average. His final game was on October 2, 1920, and it was part of the only tripleheader played in the 20th century. Following the determination of his ineligibility, Fisher signed on with one of the "outlaw" teams, pitching briefly for the Franklin, Pennsylvania, Oilers before the team folded.

About 1944, as part of a promotion for the Baseball Hall of Fame, Fisher received in the mail a silver lifetime pass to any major league ballpark in the country. The pass was signed by the presidents of both leagues and was inscribed "To Ray Fisher in appreciation of long and meritorious service", which Fisher interpreted to mean that his "blacklisting" had been lifted. This was his belief for nearly 35 years until he learned late in his life that the blacklisting was still officially on record with the Commissioner's office. In 1951 Fisher was called to Washington, D.C., to testify about his blacklisting in a House Judiciary Committee investigation into the alleged monopoly of power in professional baseball.

== Coaching ==
Fisher from the 1925 Michiganensian

Fisher remained head baseball coach for the University of Michigan's baseball team for 38 seasons. His original agreement with Michigan also assigned him as an assistant basketball coach, a position he held through 1941, and as assistant football coach, in which capacity he served through 1945. In freshman football, he coached Gerald Ford and Tom Harmon. While at Michigan, Fisher led his baseball teams to 15 Big Ten championships and the 1953 College World Series championship, after which he was named Coach of the Year. In 1923, Fisher became Michigan's first coach in the 20th century to integrate a varsity sport.

In 1929 and 1932 Fisher's Michigan teams played against teams in Japan at the invitation of Meiji University. On the way to Japan in 1932, on a stop in Hawaii, the Michigan team played the independent Negro Team the Brooklyn Royal Giants. The team returned from Japan in October 1929 aboard the SS Shinyō Maru, sailing from Yokohama to San Francisco. Fisher was active in the startup of the National Association of College Baseball Coaches and served as its first vice president. During the 1940s he was hailed by sports writers as "the Fielding Yost of the diamond" and by Esquire Magazine as a close second to Jack Barry of Holy Cross as the top college baseball coach in the country. Fisher was generally regarded as one of the nation's premiere instructors of college pitchers. He was known both for his droll sense of humor and his potential for argumentativeness with umpires. The latter may have frequently been strategic; in his later years at Michigan the press sometimes referred to him as "The Old Fox". While coaching summer teams in Vermont's Northern League, Fisher mentored Robin Roberts (1946 and 1947), who sent many accolades in Fisher's direction once he was signed into the major leagues.

== Retirement and later life ==
By the time he retired in 1958, Fisher had compiled a 636–295–8 record as a coach (.600 or better in 32 of 38 seasons) with only two losing seasons, and he held the record as the University of Michigan's winningest coach for 70 years (1930–2000). For five years during the 1960s Fisher coached pitchers for the farm teams of the Milwaukee Braves and the Detroit Tigers, and into his 80s he was still working with pitchers at the request of subsequent University of Michigan baseball coaches.

When Fished learned in 1979 that his blacklisting was still officially on record with the Commissioner's office, a couple of his friends, including former President Gerald Ford, decided to appeal it to Commissioner of Baseball Bowie Kuhn. After a reinvestigation of the circumstances of Fisher's leaving the Cincinnati Reds, in 1980 Kuhn declared Fisher a "retired player in good standing" and reinstated him to professional baseball, nearly 60 years after Landis's declaration of ineligibility. In a twist of fate, following the 1981 Major League Baseball strike, the Cincinnati Reds came to the University of Michigan for workouts at Ray Fisher Stadium, where they met the 93-year-old former Reds pitcher.

In the summer of 1982, Fisher was invited to the yearly Old-Timers' Day at Yankee Stadium, his first visit to the famous facility which had been built after he'd left the team. Approaching age 95, he was then the oldest former Yankee, Cincinnati Red and World Series player. He received two standing ovations from the fans, second only to Joe DiMaggio, and threw out the opening pitch for that day's Yankees-Rangers game. He died three months later in Ann Arbor, Michigan and is buried in Washtenong Memorial Park.

== Legacy ==
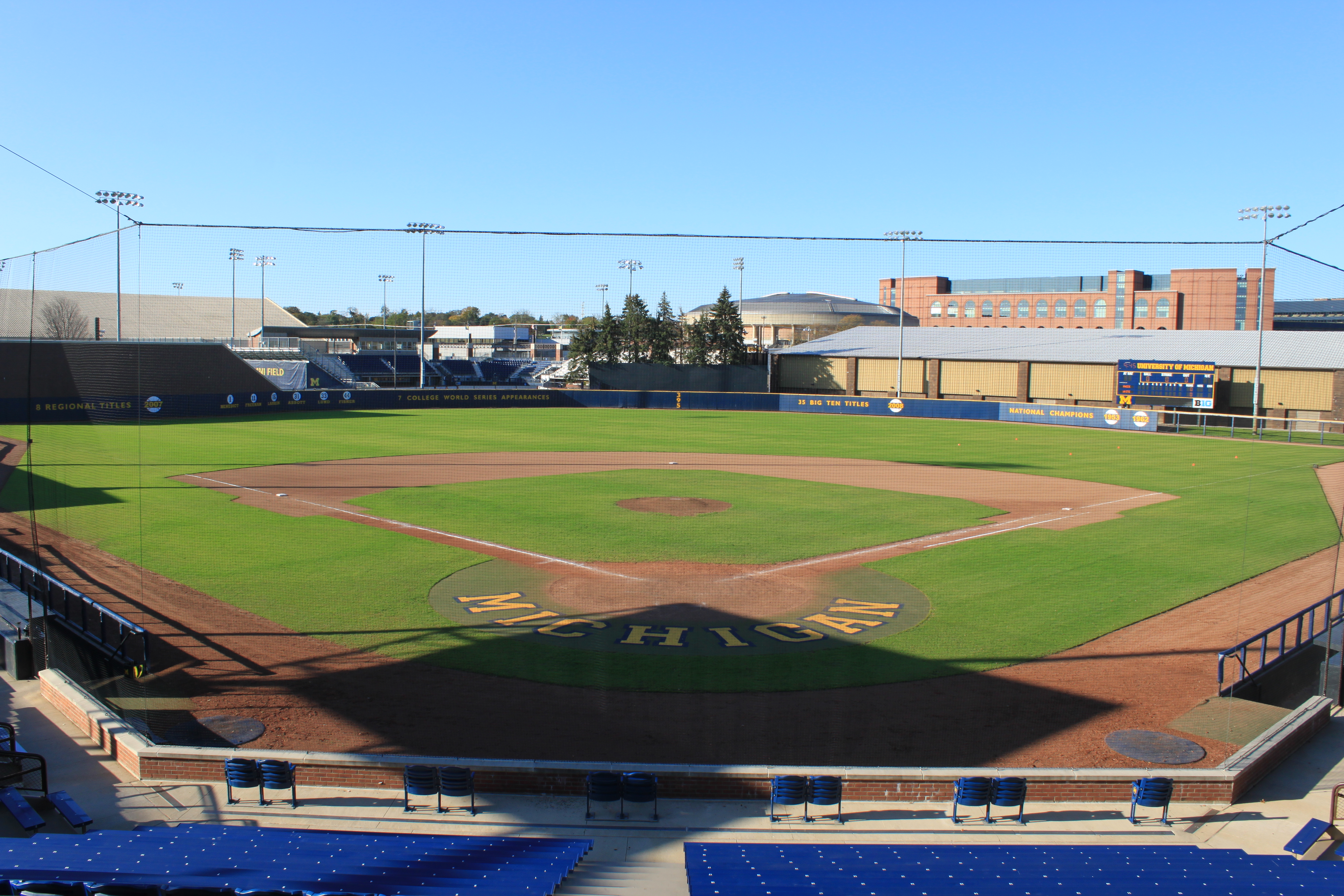
Ray Fisher Stadium view from seats behind home plate

Among his honors, Fisher was inducted into the Michigan Sports Hall of Fame (1959), the American Association of College Baseball Coaches Hall of Fame (1966), the University of Michigan Athletic Hall of Honor (1979), the Vermont Sports Hall of Fame (2013), the Middlebury Athletics Hall of Fame (2015), and the College Baseball Hall of Fame (2025). Fisher's uniform number has been retired by the Michigan Wolverines baseball team and by the Vermont Mountaineers. At least 19 of Fisher's Michigan players signed with a major league team.

On May 23, 1970, twelve years after Fisher's retirement, the baseball stadium at the University of Michigan, until then unnamed, was dedicated as Ray Fisher Stadium. Thirty-eight years later, on May 2, 2008, a renovated Ray Fisher Stadium was incorporated into the university's new Wilpon Baseball and Softball Complex, Fred Wilpon having pitched for Michigan under Fisher.

On July 25, 2003, through the efforts of the Vermont chapter of the Society for American Baseball Research, the State of Vermont placed an historic site marker near Ray Fisher's birthplace, at the intersection of U.S. Route 7 (Court Street) and Creek Road in Middlebury, Vermont.

Fisher's influence on pitchers was still being felt many years after his death. In the 2010 American League Championship Series, Texas Rangers pitcher Cliff Lee gave quite a performance using a cut fastball taught to him by "Ace" Adams, who had learned the pitch from Fisher at Michigan after the latter's retirement.

== See also ==
- University of Michigan Athletic Hall of Honor

== Sources ==
- Farber C, Farber R (2006). Spitballers: The Last Legal Hurlers of the Wet One. Jefferson, North Carolina: McFarland. ISBN 0-7864-2347-1.
- Finch, Robert L, ed., The National Association of Professional Baseball Leagues. (1953). The Story of Minor League Baseball. Columbus, Ohio: The Stoneman Press.
- Istorico, Ray. (2008). Greatness in Waiting: An Illustrated History of the Early New York Yankees, 1903–1919. Jefferson, North Carolina: McFarland. ISBN 978-0-7864-3211-0.
- Jones, David, ed. (2006). Deadball Stars of the American League. Dulles, Virginia: Potomac Books. ISBN 1-933599-01-4.
- Perry, Will, ed. (1979). Michigan All-Time Athletic Record Book. Ann Arbor: The Board in Control of Intercollegiate Athletics, The University of Michigan.
- Proctor, Donald J. "Ray L. Fisher: Michigan's Captive Coach". Ann Arbor Scene Magazine. 1980, Summer, Fall.
- Proctor, Donald J. "The Blacklisting of Baseball's Ray Fisher". Baseball Research Journal, 1981.
- Proctor, Donald J. "The Ray Fisher Story". Ann Arbor Magazine. 1986, March, April.
- Simon, Tom, ed. (2000) Green Mountain Boys of Summer: Vermonters in the Major Leagues, 1882–1993. Shelburne, Vermont: New England Press. ISBN 1-881535-35-5.
- Stameshkin, David M. (1985). The Town's College: Middlebury College, 1800-1915. Middlebury, Vermont: Middlebury College Press.
- Study of Monopoly of Power: Hearings Before the Subcommittee on Study of Monopoly Power of the Committee on the Judiciary House of Representatives (1952). United States Government Printing Office.
