= Michigan Wolverines track and field =

Track and field team of the University of Michigan

Michigan Wolverines
- University: University of Michigan
- Head coach: Kevin Sullivan (2nd season)
- Conference: Big Ten
- Location: Ann Arbor, Michigan, US
- Indoor track: U-M Indoor Track Building
- Outdoor track: U-M Track & Field Stadium
- Nickname: Wolverines
- Colors: Maize and blue

NCAA Outdoor National Championships
- Men: 1923

Conference Indoor Championships
- Men: 1918, 1919, 1923, 1925, 1931, 1934, 1935, 1936, 1937, 1938, 1939, 1940, 1943, 1944, 1945, 1955, 1956, 1959, 1960, 1961, 1963, 1964, 1976, 1978, 1982, 1994; Women: 1983, 1994, 1998, 1999, 2002, 2003, 2005, 2006, 2016, 2023

Conference Outdoor Championships
- Men: 1901, 1902, 1903, 1904, 1906, 1918, 1919, 1923, 1925, 1926, 1930, 1932, 1933, 1935, 1937, 1938, 1939, 1940, 1943, 1944, 1955, 1956, 1961, 1962, 1976, 1978, 1980, 1981, 1982, 1983, 2008; Women: 1993, 1994, 1998, 2002, 2003, 2004, 2007, 2016, 2023

The Michigan Wolverines track and field teams are the intercollegiate track and field programs representing the University of Michigan. The school competes in the Big Ten Conference in Division I of the National Collegiate Athletic Association (NCAA).

Michigan men's and women's track and field athletes have won 63 NCAA/AIAW individual event championships (47 men's, 16 women's), 14 Olympic gold medals, 76 Big Ten Conference team championships (31 men's outdoor, 26 men's indoor, 9 women's outdoor, 10 women's indoor), and one NCAA team championship.

The men's team has had 13 coaches in 122 years from 1901 to 2022. The teams are currently coached by head coach Kevin Sullivan.

== Coaches ==
Men's coaches
Coach	Years	Overall	Notes
Keene Fitzpatrick	1901–10	24–2–1	6 Western Conference championships; 8 Olympic medalists
Alvin Kraenzlein	1911–12	1–5–0	
Stephen Farrell	1913–29	50–16–1	1 NCAA team championship; 4 Big Ten team indoor championships; 5 Big Ten team outdoor championships
Charles B. Hoyt	1930–39	40–6–0	
Ken Doherty	1940–48	22–14–1	7 Big Ten team indoor championships; 7 Big Ten team outdoor championships
Don Canham	1950–68	52–13–2	4 Big Ten team indoor championships; 3 Big Ten team outdoor championships
David Martin	1969–71	7–6–0	7 Big Ten team indoor championships; 4 Big Ten team outdoor championships
Dixon Farmer	1972–74	6–6–0	
Jack Harvey	1975–99		4 Big Ten team indoor championships; 6 Big Ten team outdoor championships
Ron Warhurst	2000–08		1 Big Ten team outdoor championship
Fred LaPlante	2009–13		
Jerry Clayton	2014–21		

Women's coaches
Coach	Years
Red Simmons	1978–1981
Francie Goodridge	1982-1984
James Henry	1985-2017

Men's and women's combined coaches
Coach	Years
Jerry Clayton / James Henry	2018–2021
Kevin Sullivan	2022–present

== History ==
=== Fitzpatrick era (1901–10) ===
Michigan's first track coach was the famous trainer Keene Fitzpatrick (1864–1944). Fitzpatrick was a track coach, athletic trainer, professor of physical training and gymnasium director for 42 years at Yale (1890–1891, 1896–1898), Michigan (1894–1895, 1898–1910), and Princeton (1910–1932). He was considered "one of the pioneers of intercollegiate sport." Fitzpatrick was first hired by Michigan in 1894 as the trainer for the school's football team. He continued to be the trainer of Michigan's football teams through 1910, and was credited by many with the success of Fielding H. Yost's "Point-a-Minute" football teams of the early 1900s.

Fitzpatrick became Michigan's first track coach in 1900 and continued to serve in that role through 1910. During those years, Fitzpatrick's teams compiled a 24–2–1 record in dual meets and won Western Conference track championships in 1900, 1901, 1902, 1903, 1904, and 1906. In 1907, Michigan sent its track team east to compete for their inaugural Inter-Collegiate Association of Amateur Athletics of America ("IC4A") meet, and Fitzpatrick's team came away with 29 points and a second-place finish.

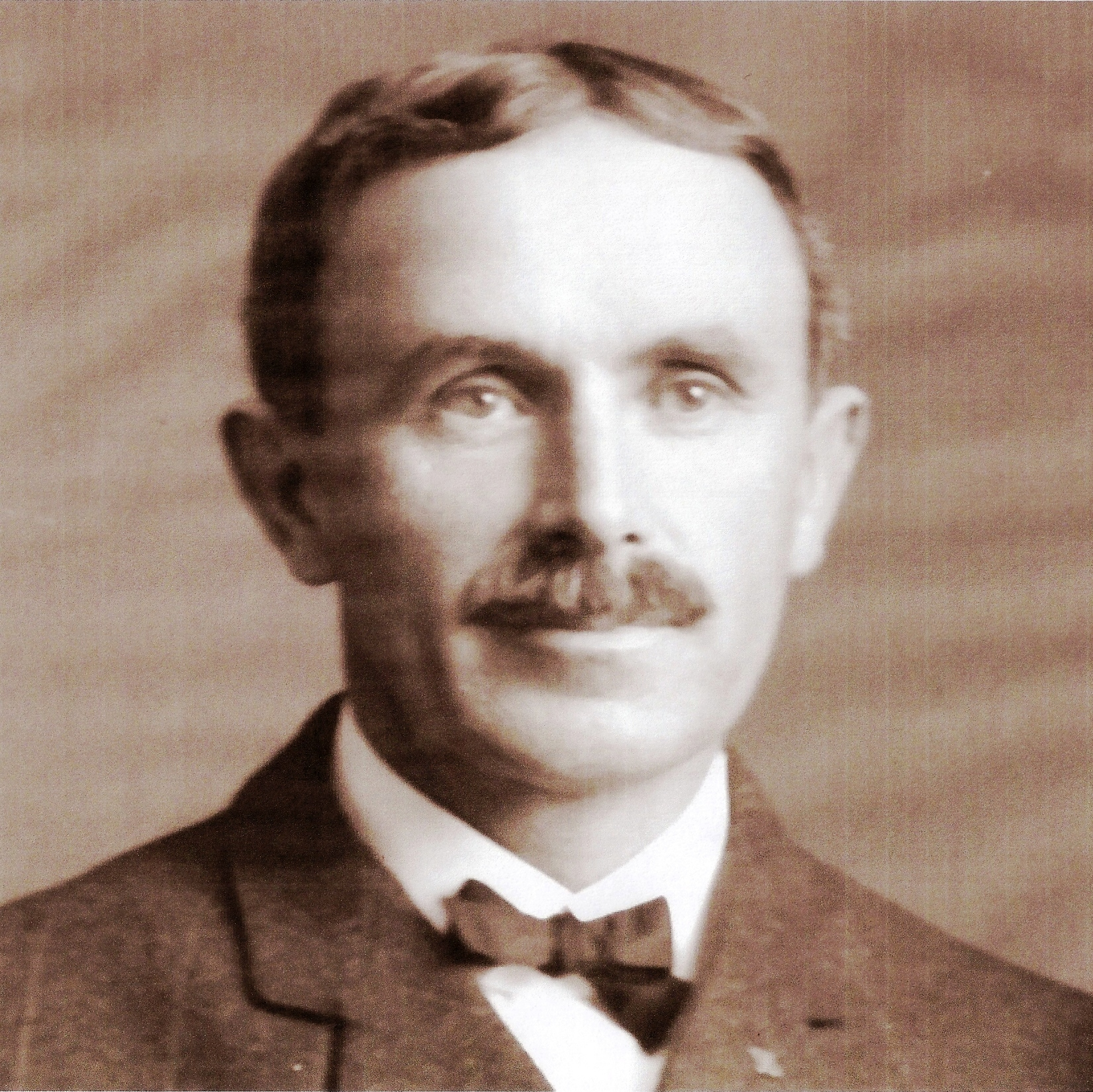
Michigan's first track coach, Keene Fitzpatrick

Fitzpatrick's athletes excelled in four Olympiads during his tenure as track coach, bringing home 7 gold medals out of 15.

In 1900, funds were solicited from faculty, students, alumni and Ann Arbor businessmen to send Fitzpatrick and four Michigan track athletes to the 1900 Paris Summer Olympics. John McLean won a silver medal in the high hurdles. Michigan's champion pole-vaulter, Charles Dvorak and other Americans faced a quandary: finals of some events were scheduled on Sunday, including the pole vault. Several American university teams agreed they could not violate the Sabbath. Dvorak was reportedly told that the final had been rescheduled, but Dvorak and another American left. Several special competitions were conducted later to accommodate the Americans, when Dvorak win a silver medal.

One of the highlights for Michigan athletics during the Fitzpatrick years came at the 1904 Summer Olympics in St. Louis, Missouri, which have sometimes been referred to as the "Michigan Olympics." Five University of Michigan track and field athletes won nine medals: six gold, two silver, and one bronze. The Michigan medal winners at the 1904 Olympics were:

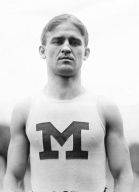
Michigan's first track and field star Archie Hahn won four Olympic gold medals

- Archie Hahn – gold medals in the 60 meters, 100 meters, and 200 meters;
- Ralph Rose – gold medal in the shot put, silver medal in the discus, and bronze medal in the hammer throw;
- Charles Dvorak – gold medal in the pole vault;
- Fred Schule – gold medal in the 110-meter hurdles; and
- Wesley Coe – silver medal in the shot put.

Archie Hahn became a major star, and Fitzpatrick was credited with developing his unusual running style. Shortly before the 1904 Olympics, a Wisconsin sports writer described the style this way:

"Hahn has a new style of running. Nobody at Michigan understands the style, except that Keene Fitzpatrick invented it, and that Hahn steps differently than ever before. Even to see Hahn's new stride is not to analyze how he manages to lift his feet so high in front. The new stride suggests that he is trying to climb a hill. The little man has toughened every muscle in his body and trained it to be a spring."

With three medals, Ralph Rose also became a star. In December 1904, the New York Evening Sun wrote that Rose was "the first perfect physique ever seen at the University of Michigan" as measured by Fitzpatrick's anthropometric charts. At 6 feet, 3 inches, 246 pounds, a 29.9-inch right thigh, and a 47.6-inch expanded chest, he was the school's first "perfect physique."

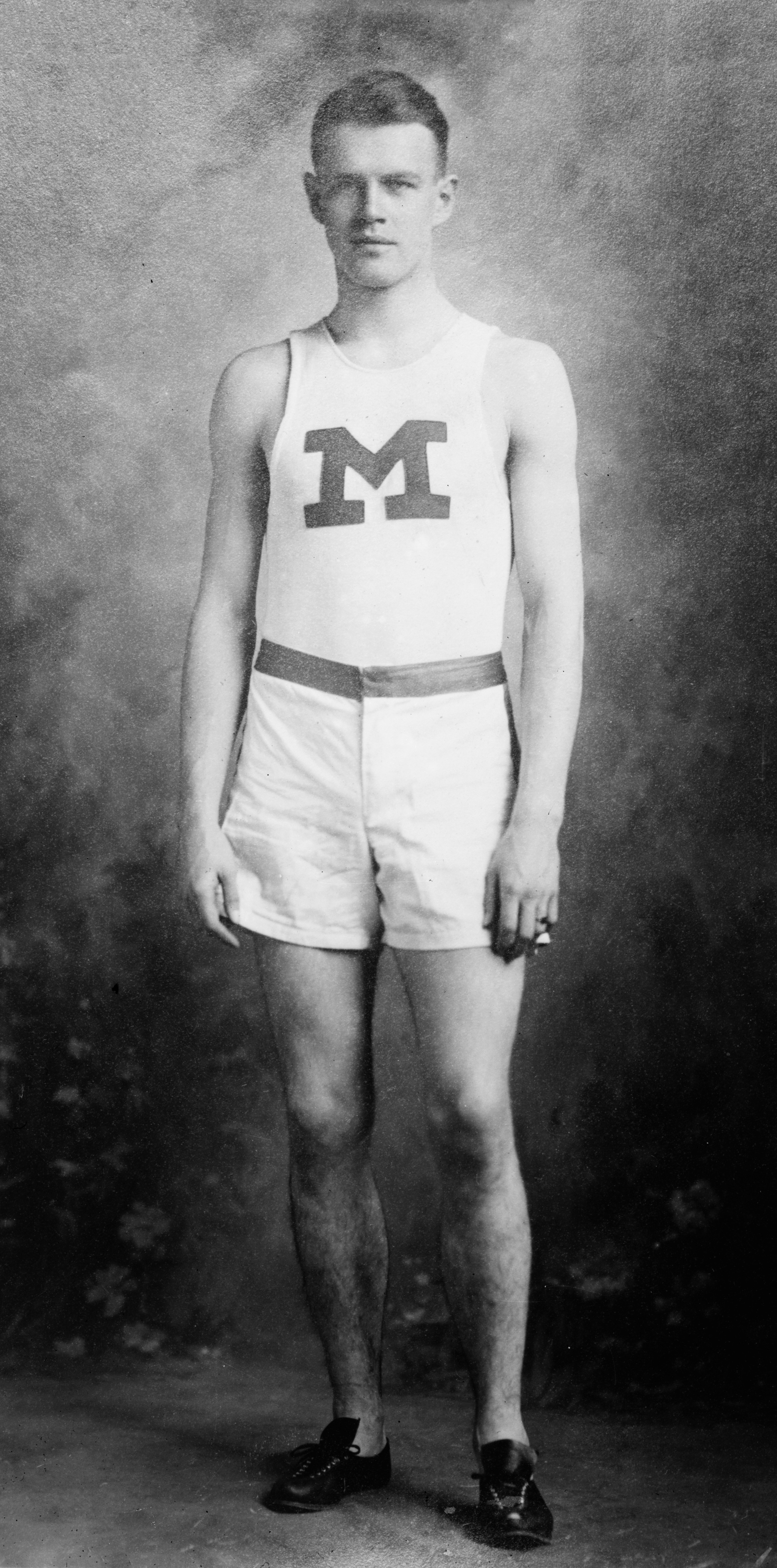
Fitzpatrick said Ralph Craig was the best sprinter he ever turned out.

At the 1906 Summer Olympics in Athens, Archie Hahn successfully defended his gold medal standing in the 100-meter, adding it to his three others. And at the 1908 Summer Olympics in London, Michigan athlete Ralph Rose repeated as the gold medalist in the shot put, and John Garrels won a silver medal in the 110-meter hurdles and a bronze in the shot put.

Fitzpatrick also coached Ralph Craig. Following Fitzpatrick's departure from Michigan, Craig went on to win gold medals in the 100 metres and 200 metres at the 1912 Summer Olympics in Stockholm. In 1932, Fitzpatrick said that Craig was the best sprinter he ever turned out, though Johnny Garrels was the best all-around athlete he ever handled. Fitzpatrick's pupils, Hahn and Craig, were the only Olympic double sprint winners prior to another Michigan athlete, Eddie Tolan, accomplishing the feat at the 1932 Summer Olympics.

=== Kraenzlein era (1911–12) ===
When Fitzpatrick left Michigan to become a trainer and coach at Princeton, Michigan hired Alvin Kraenzlein, one of the most accomplished athletes in the county, as his replacement. Kraenzlein won four gold medals for the United States at the 1900 Summer Olympics in Paris, winning the gold in the 60-meter sprint, the 110-meter hurdles, the 200-meter hurdles, and the long jump. In Kraenzlein's two years as coach, the team finished third at the IC4A meet both years.

=== Farrell era (1913–29) ===
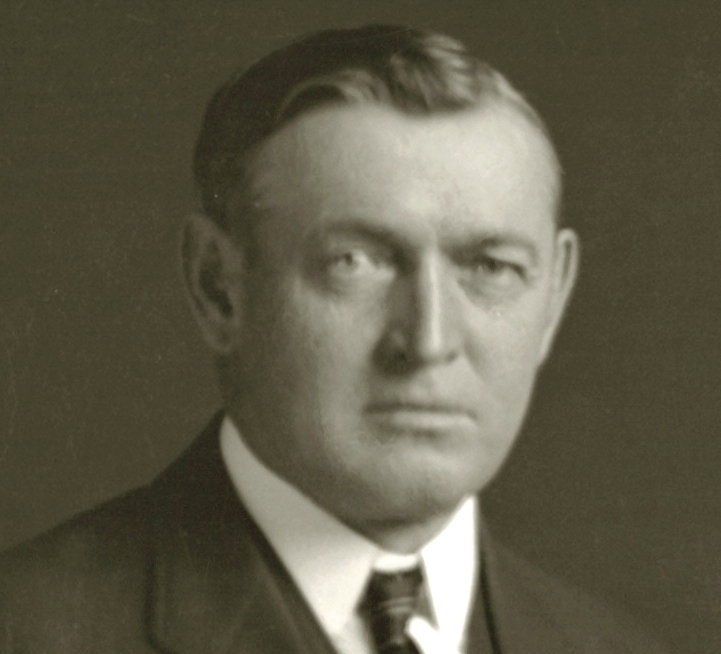
Stephen Farrell led Michigan to the NCAA track and field championship in 1923.

Michigan's third track coach, Stephen Farrell (1863–1933) raced with hook and ladder teams in the 1880s and became known as "the greatest professional footracer this country has ever known." He was the first American to be a two-time winner of England's Sheffield Cup and competed in races from 100 yards to one mile. Seeking new challenges, he performed with the Barnum & Bailey Circus for several years racing against a horse, and losing only a half dozen times.

In September 1912, Farrell was hired as the athletic trainer at the University of Michigan and noted at the time that the Ann Arbor institution "is the only western college that is thought much of down east." He served as the school's track coach until his retirement in 1930, and he was also the trainer to Fielding H. Yost's football teams from 1912 to 1919.

In 1915, a series of newspaper articles touted Farrell as an innovator in track coaching, noting his innovations in the following areas:

- In February 1915, The New York Times reported on Farrell's novel plan to instill "enthusiasm and vim" in his athletes by having them train to the accompaniment of music played by the Varsity band. Farrell noted that his athletes had been taking more interest in dancing competitions than athletic training. Farrell planned to have the musicians "render tunes a trifle faster than the natural stride" of Michigan's best performer in each event. "It is expected that the inspiration of the music and the natural efforts of the dancers to get in time should make the Michigan men exert themselves more willingly than they are at present doing."
- In January 1915, Farrell introduced rope skipping as a training method for his long-distance runners. Farrell noted, "It is a great form of exercise to develop the body, especially making men long winded and strong in the legs. It also has a tendency in making them quick and alert on their toes."
- Farrell instituted "the espionage system of discovering budding athletes" by stationing "a force of spies" in the college gymnasium watching for men of sufficient prowess to compete on the track team. The "new detective method of locating possible athletes" was begun after a freshman student was seen completing a high jump of six feet — six inches higher than any member of the track team.

When Michigan rejoined the Big Ten Conference in 1918, Farrell's Michigan track teams promptly won the indoor and outdoor track championships in both 1918 and 1919. Between 1918 and 1930, Farrell's teams won ten Big Ten Conference championships. His teams had a 50–16–1 record in dual meets, and his athletes won 76 Big Ten individual event titles and 11 NCAA individual event titles. Michigan also won its only NCAA team track championship in 1923 under Farrell.

During the Farrell era, Michigan's star athletes included:

- Carl Johnson — the first athlete to win four events at a Big Ten Conference meet; silver medalist in the long jump at the 1920 Summer Olympics held in Antwerp, Belgium.
- DeHart Hubbard — the first African American to win an Olympic gold medal in an individual event (the long jump at the 1924 Summer Olympics in Paris); Hubbard also set world records in the long jump (25 feet 10 3/4 inches (7.89 m)) and the 100-yard dash (9.6 seconds); and
- Eddie Tolan, gold medalist in the 100 and 200-meter races at the 1932 Summer Olympics.
- Phil Northrup – a three-time NCAA champion and four-time All-American, in the javelin throw and pole vault, (1925–27). Northrup was inducted to the University of Michigan Athletic Hall of Fame in 2007.

Walter Eckersall later wrote that, beyond coaching stars, Farrell was "a stickler for balance and depended more upon the ability of athletes to win third, fourth and fifth places than those who were picked to win." He won many meets by focusing on team power and placing athletes where they could score points.

When Farrell announced his retirement, the noted sports columnist Grantland Rice paid tribute to Farrell's talent in training sprinters.

"As long as Farrell is active he will continue to turn out championship sprinters. The 'Steve start' is about the fastest thing uncovered. Michigan sprinters are in the lead at ten yards. They're out in front here, even when they're occasionally whipped. There is no finer influence on college athletes in America than that which Steve exerts at Michigan ..."

=== Hoyt era (1930–39) ===
Michigan's fourth track coach was Charles B. Hoyt, a native of Iowa won intercollegiate championships in both the 100-yard and 220-yard runs before turning to coaching.

Hoyt was hired by the University of Michigan in 1923 as the assistant to Stephen Farrell and trainer of the football team. In 1930, he took over the head coaching post when Farrell retired. In Hoyt's ten years as Michigan's head coach, Michigan track teams won 14 of a possible 20 Big Ten Conference indoor and outdoor titles, including six straight indoor championships from 1934 to 1939. With Hoyt as head coach, Michigan was 40-6-0 in dual meets. His Michigan athletes also won five individual NCAA championships and 63 individual Big Ten championships (27 indoor and 33 outdoor). The athletes Hoyt coached at Michigan include:

- Sam Stoller – one of two Jews on the American track team at the 1936 Berlin Olympics; a controversy was sparked when he was pulled from the 4 x 100 meter relay event.
- William Watson – won 12 individual Big Ten Conference championships, including three consecutive championships (1937–1939) in the long jump, discus and shot put; first African-American to win the AAU decathlon championship in 1940
- Elmer Gedeon – tied a world record in the high hurdles in 1938; shot down and killed while piloting a B-26 bomber on a mission over France in April 1944.
- Willis Ward – collegiate champion in the high jump, long jump, 100-yard dash, and 400-yard dash; finished second in voting for AP Big Ten Athlete of the Year in 1933; second African-American to letter in football at Michigan.
- Bob Osgood – set a world record in the 120-yard high hurdles in May 1937; won Big Ten Conference championship in the event in both 1936 and 1937.

=== Doherty era (1940–48) ===
Michigan's fifth track coach, Ken Doherty (1905–1996), was an American decathlon champion before he turned to coaching. He won the American decathlon championship in 1928 and 1929 while a student at the University of Michigan; he also won the bronze medal in the event at the 1928 Summer Olympics in Amsterdam.

Doherty, described as "a lean, quiet Scot," was hired as an assistant track coach at Michigan in 1930, by the University of Michigan as its assistant track coach serving under the Wolverines' new head coach, Charles B. Hoyt. He remained Hoyt's assistant for nine years and took over as Michigan's head track coach in 1939 when Hoyt accepted a job at Yale. Doherty served nine years as Michigan's head coach, leading Michigan to seven Big Ten Conference championships (four indoor and three outdoor). In his nine years as head coach at Michigan, he coached some of the schools all-time great athletes, including the following:

- William Watson – won 12 individual Big Ten Conference championships, including three consecutive championships (1937–1939) in the long jump, discus and shot put; first African-American to win the AAU decathlon championship in 1940
- Robert H. Hume and H. Ross Hume – the "dead heat twins" who were champions in the mile and regularly finished their races holding hands in dead heat victories.
- Bob Ufer – set the world indoor record in the 440 yards and later the radio voice of Michigan football
- Don Canham – All-America who won the 1940 NCAA title in the high jump and was both the indoor and outdoor Big Ten Conference champion in both 1940 and 1941; succeeded Doherty as Michigan's track coach and became a school legend as its athletic director from 1968 to 1988
- Charlie Fonville – NCAA shot put champion in 1947 and 1948; set world record in 1948

=== Canham era (1950–68) ===
Don Canham took over as Michigan's track and field coach in 1950. He remained the head coach from 1950 to 1968. Canham was a Michigan graduate who won the NCAA high jump championship in 1940. During Canham's 19 years as Michigan's head coach, the track and field team compiled a record of 52–13–2 in dual meets and won seven Big Ten team championships—four indoor and three outdoor.

Outstanding individual performers during the Canham era include the following:

- Charlie Fonville – won three Big Ten championships in the shot put and set a new world record in the event
- Don McEwen – won six Big Ten individual titles and two NCAA individual titles in the two-mile race
- Roland Nilsson – won six Big Ten championships in the shot put and finished 5th in the event at the 1952 Summer Olympics
- Milt Mead – won the 1953 NCAA championship in the high jump
- Dave Owen – won nine individual Big Ten titles and one NCAA individual title in the shot put
- Eeles Landström – won two Big Ten championships in the pole vault and a bronze medal at the 1960 Summer Olympics
- Tom Robinson – represented the Bahamas as a sprinter in four Summer Olympics from 1956 to 1968; gold medalist in the 100-meter race at the 1962 Central American and Caribbean Games
- Ergas Lep – won nine Big Ten individual championships in middle-distance events; competed for Canada on the 1960 and 1964 Olympic teams
- Kent Bernard – won five individual Big Ten titles in sprint events and competed in the 1964 Summer Olympics
- Ron Kutschinski – Big Ten champion and All-American distance runner who competed for the United States in the 1968 Summer Olympics

=== Martin era (1969–71) ===
Dave Martin was Michigan's head coach from 1969 to 1971. Martin began with the Michigan track team as an All-American runner and Big Ten steeplechase champion. After graduating from Michigan in 1961, he became an assistant coach under Don Canham. Martin took over as head coach in 1969, and coached six All-Americans in his three years with Michigan. Martin's 1969 team finished 11th in the NCAA indoor championships.

=== Farmer era (1972–74) ===
Dixon Farmer was Michigan's head coach from 1972 to 1974. Farmer was an NCAA champion in the 440-yard hurdles before becoming a coach. In three years at Michigan, he coached six All-Americans including Jamaican hurdler Godfrey Murray and Kim Rowe. Farmer's 1973 team finished eighth at the NCAA Indoor Championships.

=== Harvey era (1975–99) ===
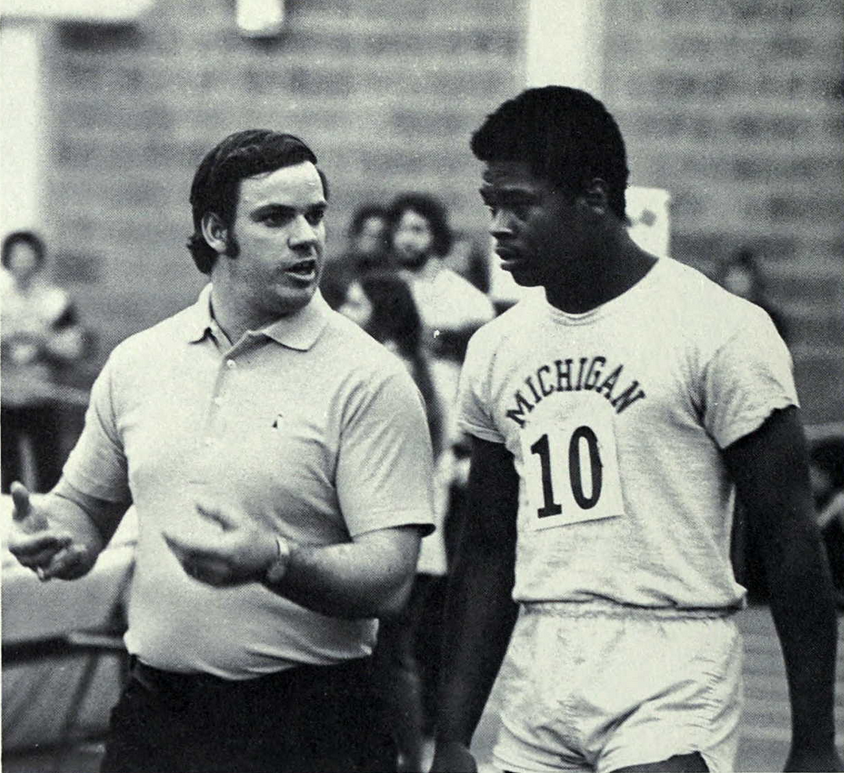
Coach Harvey with Russell Davis, c. 1976

Jack Harvey served as head coach of the Michigan track team for 25 years from 1975 to 1999—longer than any other head coach in the history of the program. Harvey was a University of Michigan track team member in the 1960s, an All-American and Big Ten shot put champion. He served as an assistant coach at the school before taking over as head coach in 1975. Harvey coached 93 All-Americans and six Olympians in his 25 years as head coach. His track teams placed in the top ten at the NCAA championships on five occasions and won 10 Big Ten championships—four indoor and six outdoor.

Outstanding individual performers during the Harvey era include the following:

- Greg Meyer – was a Big Ten champion distance runner and an All-American in the steeplechase while competing for Michigan from 1974 to 1977; won the Boston Marathon in 1983
- Mike Lattany – won three Big Ten individual championships in the high jump while competing for Michigan from 1979 to 1982
- Andrew Bruce – won eight Big Ten individual championships as a sprinter for Michigan from 1979 to 1982; competed in the 1980 Summer Olympics
- Brian Diemer – competed for Michigan in the steeplechase from 1980 to 1983; won NCAA 3000m steeplechase in 1983; and participated in three Olympiads (1984–1992), winning his inaugural Olympic bronze medal in 1984
- Thomas Wilcher – won an NCAA individual championship as a hurdler while competing for Michigan in the mid-1980s; was a three-time All-American
- John Scherer – won three NCAA individual championships and four Big Ten individual championships as a distance runner for Michigan from 1986 to 1989

=== Warhurst era (2000–08) ===
Ron Warhurst was Michigan's head track coach for nine years from 2000 to 2008. Warhurst had been a member of the cross country teams at Western Michigan that won consecutive NCAA championships in 1964 and 1965. From 1968 to 1970, Warhurst served in the U.S. Marine Corps and was awarded two Purple Hearts and a Navy Commendation Medal for service in Vietnam. He became the University of Michigan's cross country coach in 1974, a position he has held for more than 35 years. He served as assistant coach of the men's track and field team for 26 years. In 2000, Warhurst took over as head coach of the track team. Warhurst has coached 44 All-Americans and 12 Olympians at Michigan. His 2004 team finished fifth at the NCAA indoor championship. In 2008, Warhurst's team won the school's first Big Ten outdoor championship since 1983. Michigan won six individual Big Ten event championships in 2008, and Warhurst was named Big Ten Coach of the Year and Great Lakes Regional Coach of the Year.

During the Warhurst era, Michigan's middle-distance runners excelled. In 2003, Canadian runner Nate Brannen won the NCAA indoor championship in the 800-meter run. In 2005, New Zealand middle-distance runner Nick Willis won the NCAA indoor championship in the mile run. A third middle-distance runner, Andrew Ellerton won the NCAA outdoor championship in the 800-meter run in 2007. Michigan also dominated the distance medley event in the mid-2000s, winning the NCAA indoor championship in 2004 (with a team of DarNell Talbert, Ellerton, Willis, and Brannen) and again in 2005 (with a team of Rondell Ruff, Stan Waithe, Ellerton, and Brannen).

Nicholas 'Nick' Willis is one of Ron Warhurst's biggest coaching success stories. He is a 4-time Olympiad and 2-time Olympics medallist. His inaugural Olympiad was the 2004 Athens Summer Olympic, competing for New Zealand in the 1500 meters. Three Michigan middle-distance runners all qualified for the 1500 meters race at the 2008 Summer Olympics in Beijing—Nick Willis for New Zealand, and Kevin Sullivan and fellow Canadian Nate Brannen for Canada. Willis won his inaugural Olympic medal (silver) at the 2008 Beijing Summer Olympics in the 1500 meters. He also competed in the 2012 London Summer Olympics, and again in the Summer Olympics in Rio de Janeiro in 2016 winning his second Olympic medal, Bronze in the 1500 meters. Willis also won the gold medal in the 1500 meters race at the 2006 Commonwealth Games and bronze medals in the 2010 and 2014 Commonwealth Games 1500 meters. Warhurst remained as head coach up until 2008, and in 2009 he then became an associate head coach for the track and field team under current head coach Fred LaPlante. He has coached Nick Willis since he entered the University of Michigan as a freshman collegiate runner on the MU Track and Field team in 2003, and ever since then as Willis has pursued a successful professional running career. They have one of the most successful coach/athlete partnerships in the history of Wolverine track and field to date, spanning 14 years, with Warhurst having guided Willis through 4 Olympiads and 3 Commonwealth Games culminating in a total of 5 medals in Willis's specialty the 1500M. In 2015 Ron Warhurst, Nick Willis, and former team-mate Nate Brannen were inducted into the Michigan Track and Field Hall of Fame.

Michigan's sprinters and hurdlers also excelled in the late 2000s. In 2007, Jeff Porter won the NCAA indoor championship in the 60-meter hurdles. Sprinter Adam Harris was named the 2008 Big Ten Track Athlete of the Year after winning Big Ten event championships in the 60 meters (indoors), 200 meters and 4×100 meter relay. Harris ran a personal best 20.68 seconds in the 200-meter race at the NCAA Mideast Regional and qualified to compete for Guyana in that event at the 2008 Olympics.

=== LaPlante era (2009–13) ===
Fred LaPlante took over as the head coach of Michigan's track and field team in 2009. LaPlante is a native of Toledo, Ohio and a graduate of Eastern Michigan University where he was an NCAA champion in the 1,500 meters race. He has been a track coach since the 1970s, including women's head track and field coach at San Diego State from 1979 to 1983 followed by head coach of the University of Southern California women's track and field team for several years in the 1980s. LaPlante was later head coach of the Lehigh University Mountainhawks track and cross country teams in the mid-1990s, where he succeeded nationally renowned coach John Covert. He was the assistant coach at Michigan from 1997 to 2008 and was named the 2008 NCAA Great Lakes Regional Assistant Coach of the Year in 2008. That year, the Wolverines won six Big Ten sprint titles and had All-Americans in the 60-meters (Adam Harris) and the 4×400-meter relay (Andre Barnes, Andrew Wechter, Dan Harmsen and Stann Waithe).

In LaPlante's first season as head coach, sprinter Adam Harris was named the 2009 Big Ten track athlete of the year (indoor). In 2009, Harris set University of Michigan records in the 60-meter dash (6.60) and the 100-meter dash (10.09). He was also named a 2009 All-American in the 60-meter and 100-meter dashes. Harris won eight Big Ten championships at Michigan—four in 2008 and two in 2009. After graduating in 2009, Harris became a volunteer assistant coach with the Michigan track and field team.

Junior hurdler Carl Buchanon, sophomore distance runner Craig Forys, and junior multi-event performer Frank Shotwell have been named co-captains of the Michigan track and field team for the 2010 season.

=== Clayton era (2014–2021) ===
Jerry Clayton was hired from Auburn to begin what would be the 2014 season. During his first four seasons at Michigan coach the men's indoor and outdoor teams in track and field. Starting with 2018 season the coaching staffs of the men's and women's teams were combined, with Clayton and James Henry serving as coaches of both teams.

Michigan's best national finish under him was in 2016, where they finished 13th in the NCAA Men's Outdoor Championships. It is only the Wolverines second top-15 finish since 1961 and first since 1997.

=== Sullivan era (2022–present) ===
Prior to the 2022 season, it was announced that current Michigan cross country coach and assistant track coach Kevin Sullivan would be promoted to also run the track and field program.

== University of Michigan Track & Field Hall of Fame ==
In 2006, the University of Michigan track and field staff established the University of Michigan Track and Field Hall of Fame. Eleven individuals have been inducted into the men's Hall of Fame each year since 2006.

=== Men ===
Name	Event	Competition years	Induction year	Hall of Honor	Key accomplishments
Diemer, Brian	Steeplechase	1980-1983	2006	No	Three-time Olympian (1984–1992); Olympic bronze medal (1984)
Fonville, Charlie	Shot put	1946-1950	2006	Yes	Three Big Ten championships; World record holder
Hahn, Archie	Sprints	1904-1906	2006	Yes	Two-time Olympian (1904 and 1906); Four Olympic gold medals
Hoyt, Charles	Head coach	1930-1939	2006	No	14 Big Ten Conference titles
Hubbard, DeHart	Sprints, long jump	1923-1925	2006	Yes	First African-American athlete to win an individual Olympic gold medal (1924); set world record in the long jump
Johnson, Carl	Sprints, hurdles high jump	1918-1920	2006	No	1920 Olympian
Murray, Godfrey	Hurdles	1970-1973	2006	No	1972 Olympian
Nilsson, Roland "Fritz"	Shot put, discus	1952-1954	2006	No	Six Big Ten championships; Finished 5th in the shot put and 7th in the discus throw at the 1952 Summer Olympics
Robinson, Tom	Sprints	1959-1961	2006	Yes	Represented Bahamas in four Summer Olympics (1956–1968); gold medalist in the 100 meters at 1962 Central American and Caribbean Games
Sullivan, Kevin	Distance	1994-1998	2006	No	12 Big Ten individual titles; Three NCAA individual titles; Two-time Olympian
Tolan, Eddie	Sprints	1929-1931	2006	Yes	Gold medals in 100 and 200 metres, 1932 Olympics; Set world record in 100 yard dash at 9.5
Barten, Herb	Distance	1946-1949	2007	No	Five individual Big Ten titles; 1948 Olympian
Bernard, Kent	Sprints	1963-1965	2007	No	Five individual Big Ten titles; 1964 Olympian
Craig, Ralph	Sprints	1909-1911	2007	No	Two Olympic gold medals (1912)
Doherty, Ken	Head coach	1940-1948	2007	No	Seven Big Ten team titles
Donakowski, Bill	Distance	1974-1977	2007	No	Three individual titles
Gardner, Neil	Hurdles	1994-1997	2007	No	Three NCAA individual titles; 1996 Olympian
McEwen, Don	Middle distance	1950-1952	2007	Yes	Six Big Ten individual titles; Two NCAA individual titles
Northrup, Phil	Javelin, pole vault	1925-1927	2007	No	Three NCAA individual titles; Three Big Ten individual titles
Rose, Ralph	Shot put, discus	1904	2007	No	Three Olympic gold medals
Scherer, John	Distance	1986-1989	2007	No	Four Big Ten individual titles; Three NCAA individual titles
Watson, Bill	Long jump, discus, shot put	1937-1939	2007	Yes	12 individual Big Ten titles
Brooker, James	Pole vault	1923-1925	2008	No	Two individual Big Ten titles; Two NCAA individual titles; Olympic bronze medal (1924)
Bruce, Andrew	Sprints	1979-1982	2008	No	Eight individual Big Ten titles; 1980 Olympian
Canham, Don	High jump Head coach	1939-1941; 1948-1968	2008	Yes	Four individual Big Ten titles; One NCAA individual title; 11 Big Ten conference titles as coach
Dvorak, Charles	Pole vault	1900-1904	2008	No	Olympic gold medal (1904); Olympic silver medal (1900)
Hume, Robert H.	Middle distance	1943-1946	2008	Yes	Five individual Big Ten titles; One NCAA individual title
Hume, H. Ross	Middle distance	1943-1946	2008	Yes	Six individual Big Ten titles; One NCAA individual title
Lattany, Mike	High jump	1978-1980	2008	No	Three individual Big Ten titles
Lep, Ergas	Middle distance	1960-1962	2008	No	Nine individual Big Ten titles; Two-time Olympian for Canada (1960 and 1964)
Mortimer, John	Distance	1996-1999	2008	No	Five individual Big Ten titles
Owen, Dave	Shot put	1955-1957	2008	No	Nine individual Big Ten titles; One NCAA individual title
Schule, Fred	Hurdles		2008	No	Olympic gold medal (1904)
Ward, Willis	Sprints, Long jump	1931-1935	2008	Yes	Eight individual Big Ten titles; Three NCAA individual titles
Darr, Brad	Pole vault	1989-1992	2009	No	Three-time All-American; Big Ten champion; Penn Relays champion
Farrell, Stephen	Head coach	1918-1929	2009	No	1923 NCAA team championship; coached 3 Olympic champions and 11 national champions
Garrels, John	Shot put, Hurdles, Discus	1904-1907	2009	No	Olympic silver medal (1908 hurdles); Olympic bronze medal (1908 shot put); Six-time Big Ten individual champion; Three-time Penn Relays discus champion
Hester, George "Buck"	Head coach	1926-1928	2009	No	Two-time Canadian Olympian (1924 and 1928); Two-time All-American; Two Big Ten individual championships
Kutschinski, Ron	Distance	1967-1969	2009	No	1968 Olympian; All-American; Big Ten outdoor champion
Landström, Eeles	Pole vault	1958-1959	2009	No	Three-time Finnish Olympian (1952–1960); Olympic bronze medal (1960); All-American; Two Big Ten individual championships
Meyer, Greg	Distance	1974-1977	2009	No	All-American (steeplechase); Big Ten Champion; 1983 Boston Marathon winner
Stoller, Sam	Sprinter	1935-1937	2009	No	1936 Olympian and recipient of the USOC General MacArthur Medal; Two-time All-American; Big Ten individual champion
Ufer, Bob	Sprints	1941-1944	2009	Yes	Set world indoor record in 440 yard race; Three Big Ten individual championships
Wilcher, Thomas	Hurdles	1983-1987	2009	No	One NCAA individual championship; One Big Ten individual championship; Three-time All-American
Warhurst, Ron	Head coach of Men's Cross Country and Track & Field	1974-2009	2015	No	Coached at 26 NCAA Championship meets in Cross Country; Won 7 Big Ten Team titles; Won 2008 Big Ten Team title in Men's Outdoor Track & Field; 4-time Big Ten Coach of the year
Willis, Nicholas	Middle Distance runner	2003-2005	2015	No	2003 Big Ten Freshman of the year (Indoor&Outdoor); 6 time Big Ten champion; 2005 Indoor Mile champion; 5-time Olympian (2004, 2008, 2012, 2016, 2021); 2008 Beijing Olympic Silver Medallist (1500m); 2016 Rio Olympic Bronze Medallist (1500m)

=== Women ===
Name	Role	Competition years	Induction year	Hall of Honor
Kenneth "Red" Simmons	Coach	1978-81	1994	Yes
Francie Kraker Goodridge	Athlete / Coach	1966-68, 1982-84	1996	Yes
Sue Frederick Foster	Athlete / Cross Country Coach	1980-83, 1987-91	1997	Yes
Penny Neer	Athlete	1979-80-81-82	1997	Yes
Melanie Weaver	Athlete	1980-81-82-83	1999	Yes
Debbie Williams	Athlete	1979-80-81-82	1999	Yes
Sue Schroeder Ament	Athlete	1983-84-85-86	2004	No
Pam Moore Kellenberger	Athlete	1978-79	2004	No
Courtney Babcock Key	Athlete	1992-93-94-96	2004	No
Joanna Bullard Mehall	Athlete	1980-81-82-83	2004	Yes
Phyllis Ocker	Administration	1977-90	2004	No
Lisa Larsen Rainsberger	Athlete	1981-82-83	2004	Yes
Molly McClimon Watcke	Athlete	1990-93-94	2007	Yes
Joyce Wilson Eder	Athlete	1983-84-85-86	2007	No
Mindy Rowand Schmitt	Athlete	1988-89-90	2007	No
Katie McGregor	Athlete	1996-97-98-99	2007	Yes
1978 Team	Athletes	1978	2009	No
Nicole Forrester	Athlete	1996-97-98-99	2014	No
Katie (Erdman) Waits	Athlete	2003-04-05-06-07	2014	No
Nicole (Edwards) Sifuentes	Athlete	2005-06-07-08	2014	No
Geena (Gall) Lara	Athlete	2005-06-07-08-09	2014	No
Tiffany (Ofili) Porter	Athlete	2006-07-08-09	2014	Yes
Kristine Westerby	Athlete	1992-93-94	2015	No
Tania Longe	Athlete	1995-96-97-98	2015	No
April (Phillips) Wilkowski	Athlete	2000-01-02-03	2015	No
Lindsey Gallo	Athlete	2002-03-04-05	2015	No
Bettie (Wade) Zimmerman	Athlete	2006-07-08-09	2015	No
Melissa Bickett	Athlete	2001-02-03-04	2017	No
Casey Taylor	Athlete	2006-07-08-09	2017	No
Rebecca Walter	Athlete	2003-05-06	2017	No
Richelle Webb	Athlete	1991-92-93-94	2017	No
Erin Webster	Athlete	2004-05-06-07	2017	No
Cindy Ofili	Athlete	2013-14-15-16	2018	No
Anna (Willard) Grenier	Athlete	2007	2018	No

== NCAA individual event champions ==
Michigan track and field athletes have won 63 NCAA individual event championships. (All championships are outdoor unless otherwise noted.)

=== Men ===
- 1922: Howard Hoffman – javelin
- 1922: John Landowski – pole vault
- 1923: James Brooker – pole vault
- 1923: DeHart Hubbard – long jump
- 1925: Philip Northrup – javelin
- 1925: Philip Northrup – pole vault
- 1925: DeHart Hubbard – long jump
- 1925: DeHart Hubbard – 100 m Dash
- 1926: Harry Hawkins – hammer throw
- 1926: Phillip Northrup – javelin
- 1928: Wilford Ketz – hammer throw
- 1930: Holly Campbell – hammer throw
- 1931: Eddie Tolan – 200-meter dash
- 1933: Roderick Cox – hammer throw
- 1936: Bob Osgood – 400-meter intermediate hurdles
- 1937: Sam Stoller – 100-meter dash
- 1940: Don Canham – high jump
- 1944: H. Ross Hume – 1500-meter run
- 1944: Robert H. Hume – 1500-meter run
- 1945: H. Ross Hume – 1500-meter run
- 1947: Charlie Fonville – shot put
- 1948: Charlie Fonville – shot put
- 1950: Don McEwen – two-mile run
- 1951: Don McEwen – two-mile run
- 1953: Milt Mead – high jump
- 1957: Dave Owen – shot put
- 1983: Brian Diemer – 3000-meter steeplechase
- 1986: Thomas Wilcher – 55-meter hurdles
- 1988: John Scherer – 10,000-meter run
- 1989: John Scherer – 5,000-meter run
- 1989: John Scherer – 10,000-meter run
- 1995: Kevin Sullivan – mile run (indoor)
- 1995: Kevin Sullivan – 1500-meter run
- 1995: Kevin Sullivan, Trinity Townsend, Nick Karfonta, Ian Forsyth – distance medley relay (indoor)
- 1996: Neil Gardner – 400-meter intermediate hurdles
- 1996: Neil Gardner – 55-meter hurdles (indoor)
- 1998: Kevin Sullivan – mile run (indoor)
- 2003: Nate Brannen – 800-meter run (indoor)
- 2004: DarNell Talbert, Andrew Ellerton, Nick Willis, Nate Brannen – Distance Medley Relay (indoor)
- 2005: Nick Wills – mile run (indoor)
- 2005: Rondell Ruff, Stan Waithe, Andrew Ellerton, Nate Brannen – Distance Medley Relay (indoor)
- 2007: Jeff Porter – 60-meter hurdles (indoor)
- 2007: Andrew Ellerton – 800-meter run
- 2016: Mason Ferlic – 3000-meter steeplechase
- 2018: Ben Flanagan – 10,000-meter run

=== Women ===
- 1982: Penny Neer – discus throw (AIAW)
- 1994: Courtney Babcock, Molly McClimon, Richelle Webb, Kristine Westerby – distance medley relay (indoor)
- 1998: Lisa Oullet, Sarah Hamilton, Adrienne Hunter, Katie McGregor – distance medley relay (indoor)
- 1998: Katie McGregor – 3000 meters (indoor)
- 2005: Nicole Edwards, Sierra Hauser-Price, Theresa Feldkamp, Lindsey Gallo – distance medley relay (indoor)
- 2007: Tiffany Ofili – 100 meters hurdles
- 2007: Anna Willard – 3000 meters steeplechase
- 2008: Tiffany Ofili – 60 meters hurdles (indoor)
- 2008: Tiffany Ofili – 100 meters hurdles
- 2008: Geena Gall – 800 meters
- 2009: Tiffany Ofili – 60 meters hurdles (indoor)
- 2009: Tiffany Ofili – 100 meters hurdles
- 2009: Geena Gall – 800 meters
- 2016: Cindy Ofili – 60 meters hurdles (indoor)
- 2017: Jamie Phelan – 1500 meters
- 2023: Savannah Sutherland – 400 meters hurdles

== Michigan's Olympic medalists ==
The following Michigan track and field athletes have won Olympic medals, including 14 gold medals.

=== 1900 Olympics ===
- John McLean – silver medal, 110-meter high hurdles
- John McLean – silver medal in the long jump (handicap event – not recognized as an official medal)
- Charles Dvorak – silver medal, pole vault (special event – not recognized as an official medal)
- Howard Hayes – silver medal, 800-meter race (handicap event – not recognized as an official medal)

=== 1904 Olympics ===
- Archie Hahn – gold medal, 60-meter race
- Archie Hahn – gold medal, 100-meter race
- Archie Hahn – gold medal, 200-meter race
- Charles Dvorak – gold medal, pole vault
- Ralph Rose – gold medal, shot put
- Ralph Rose – silver medal, discus (tied for first with 128 feet, 10-1/2 inches, lost in throw-off)
- Ralph Rose – bronze medal, hammer throw
- Fred Schule – gold medal, 110-meter high hurdles
- Wesley Coe – silver medal, shot put

=== 1906 Olympics ===
- Archie Hahn, gold medal, 100-meter race

=== 1908 Olympics ===
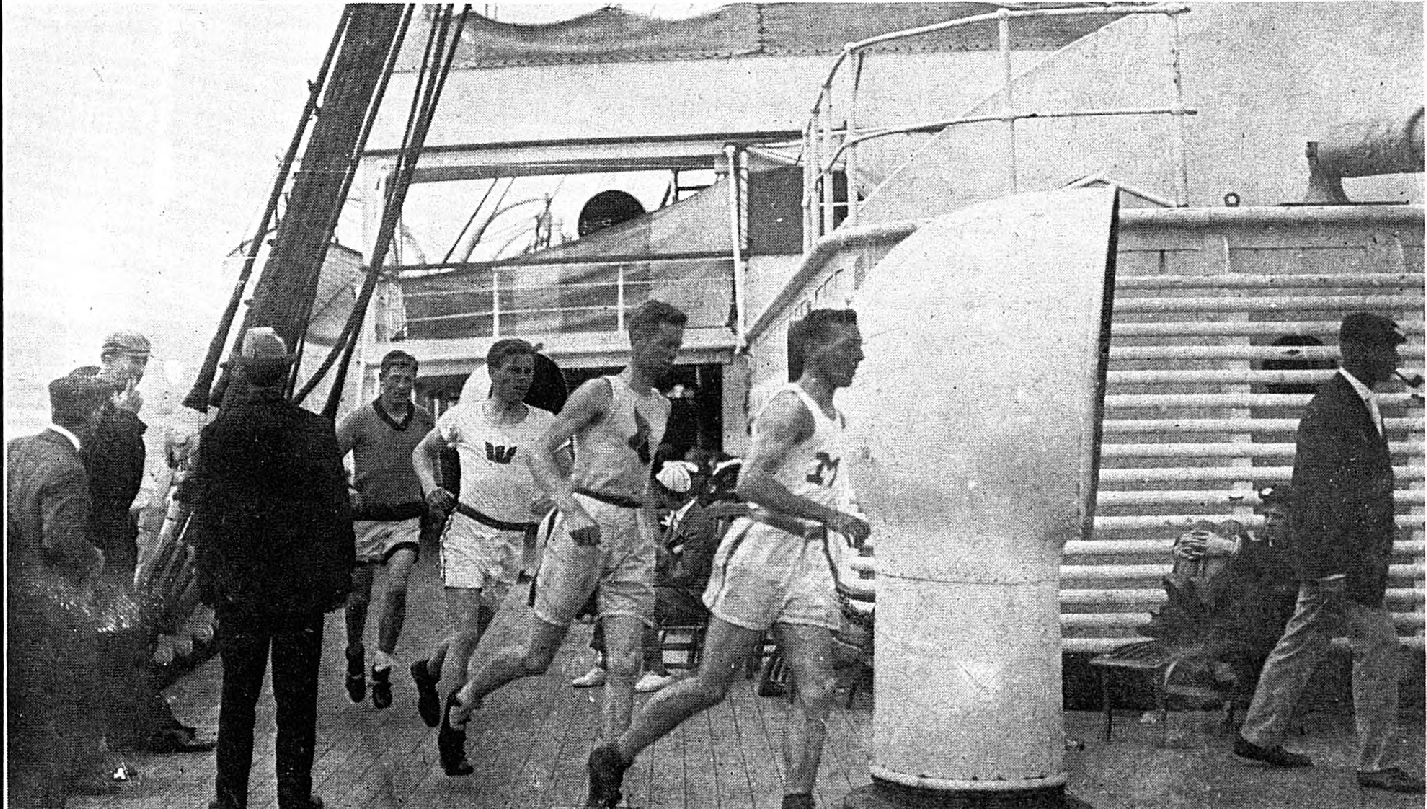
Gayle Dull training on board ship headed for 1908 Olympics

- Ralph Rose – gold medal, shot put
- John Garrels – silver medal, 110-meter high hurdles
- John Garrells – bronze medal, shot put
- Gayle Dull – U.S. silver medal, 3-mile team (Dull placed 10th overall and did not contribute to U.S. team score)

=== 1912 Olympics ===
- Ralph Craig – gold medal, 100-meter race
- Ralph Craig – gold medal, 200-meter race
- Ralph Rose – silver medal, shot put
- Ralph Rose – gold medal, two-handed shot put

=== 1920 Olympics ===
- Carl Johnson – silver medal, long jump

=== 1924 Olympics ===
- DeHart Hubbard – gold medal, long jump (first African-American to win an individual gold medal in the Olympics)
- James Brooker – bronze medal, pole vault

=== 1928 Olympics ===
- Ken Doherty – bronze medal, decathlon

=== 1932 Olympics ===
- Eddie Tolan – gold medal, 100-meter race
- Eddie Tolan – gold medal, 200-meter race

=== 1936 Olympics ===
- Sam Stoller – pulled from the gold medal-winning 4x100 meter relay team; controversy ensued over allegations that Stoller, who was Jewish, was pulled to appease the Olympic hosts

=== 1960 Summer Olympics ===
- Eeles Landström – bronze medal, pole vault (competing for Finland)

=== 1964 Summer Olympics ===
- Kent Bernard – bronze medal, 4x400 meter relay (competing for Trinidad and Tobago)

=== 1984 Summer Olympics ===
- Brian Diemer – bronze medal, 3000-meter steeplechase

=== 2008 Summer Olympics ===
- Nick Willis - silver medal, 1500-meter race (competing for New Zealand)

=== 2016 Summer Olympics ===
- Nick Willis - bronze medal, 1500-meter race (competing for New Zealand)
