= Ken Doherty (track and field) =

American decathlete (1905–1996)

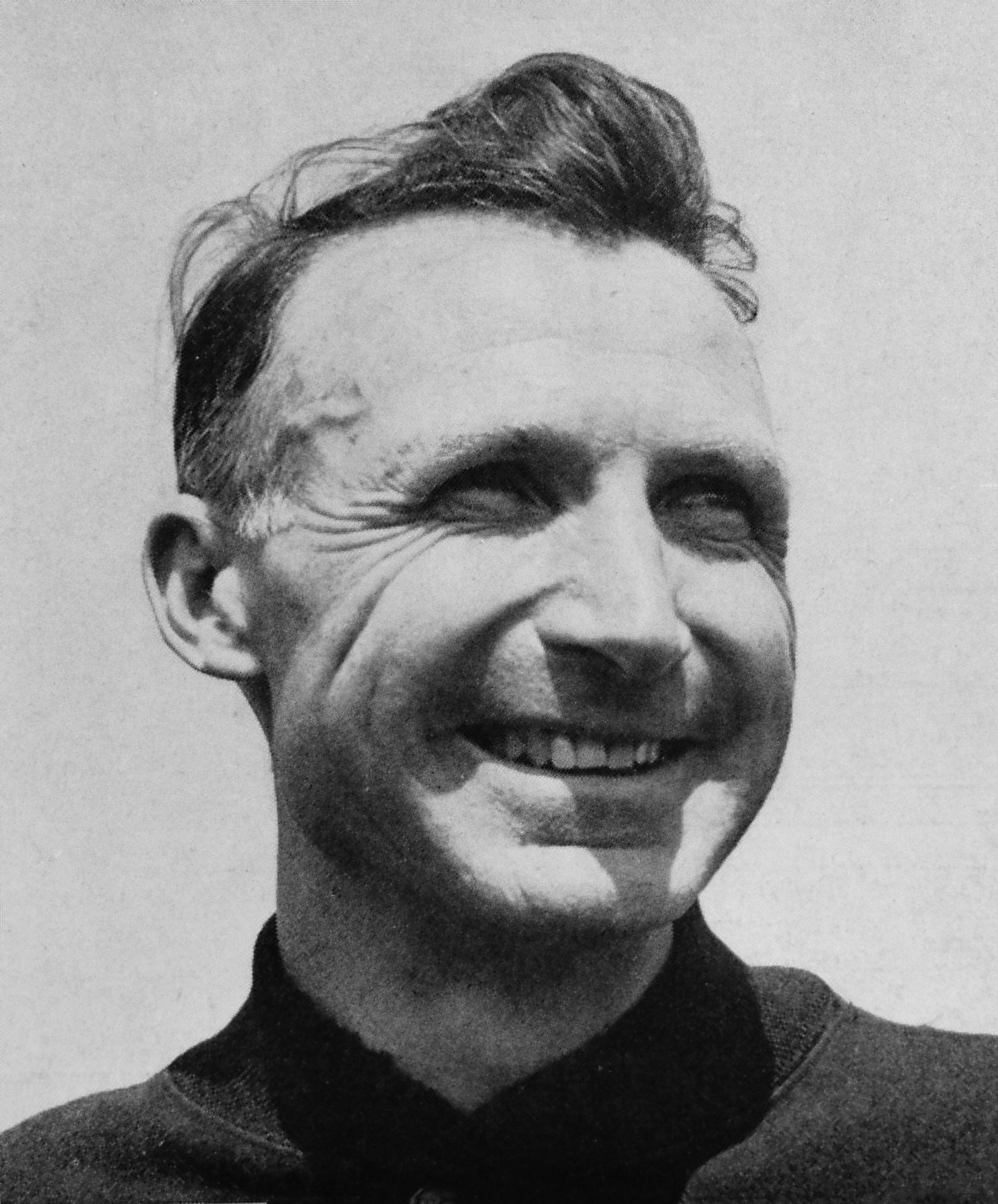

Personal information
- Born: May 16, 1905 Detroit, Michigan, U.S.
- Died: April 19, 1996 (aged 90) Lancaster, Pennsylvania, U.S.
- Education: Wayne State University
- Height: 6 ft 1 in (1.85 m)
- Weight: 165 lb (75 kg)
- Spouse: Lucile Mason
- Children: 2

Sport
- Country: United States
- Sport: Athletics
- Event: Decathlon
- Club: Cadillac Athletic Club

Achievements and titles
- Personal best: 7784 (1929)
Medal record
Men's athletics
Representing the United States
Olympic Games
Bronze medal – third place	1928 Amsterdam	Decathlon

John Kenneth Doherty (May 16, 1905 – April 19, 1996) was an American decathlon champion, college track and field coach, author and longtime director of the Penn Relays. While a student at the University of Michigan, Doherty won the American decathlon championship in 1928 and 1929 and won the bronze medal in the event at the 1928 Summer Olympics in Amsterdam. He later served as a track coach at Princeton University (1929–1930), the University of Michigan (1930–1948), and the University of Pennsylvania (1948–1957). He was also the meet director for the Penn Relays from 1956 to 1969 and of the first dual track meet between the United States and the Soviet Union in 1959. He was also a published author of works on track coaching, and his Track & Field Omnibook was regarded as "the track coach's bible" from the 1970s through the 1990s. Doherty has been inducted into at least six athletic halls of fame, including the National Track and Field Hall of Fame and athletic halls of fame at the University of Pennsylvania, University of Michigan, and Wayne State University.

== Early years ==
Born of Canadian parents who crossed the Detroit River to find work in Detroit, Michigan, Doherty recalled learning about track and field at age six when the local pole vault champion lived across the street: "I took my mother's clothes pole and tried to clear a string stretched across two fence posts." Doherty attended Detroit's Western High School where he did not earn a letter. He later recalled being small for his age in high school and joked that, at the end of high school, "they gave me a letter for long and faithful service!"

== Two-time decathlon champion ==
He enrolled in the College of the City of Detroit (later known as Wayne State University) in 1923 but did not try out for the track team until his junior year. He tried out for the track team as a high jumper, but the school's track coach, David L. Holmes, saw Doherty's potential as an all-around athlete in the decathlon, and entered him in competitions in the Penn Relays, the Illinois relays and the Ohio Relays. Doherty won four letters at Detroit City College, and was elected the student body president. He trained indoor on a track built in the 1880s for City College's "Old Main," when that large building served as Detroit's Central High School. He trained for outdoor track on a field maintained by the City of Detroit on an island in the Detroit River, Belle Isle, two miles from City College. As Doherty indicates in his autobiography, the outdoors team had neither dressing room nor showers. Even in his time, these facilities were outdated.

Doherty graduated from Detroit City College in 1927 and enrolled at the University of Michigan where he trained for the Olympics under Wolverines track coaches, Steve Farrell and Charles B. Hoyt. He also earned a master's degree at Michigan in 1933.

In 1928 Doherty won the decathlon at the United States Olympic Trials (which doubled as the AAU national outdoor championships) with a score of 7,600.52 points; due to poor weather conditions, the competition was held over three days instead of the usual two. At the 1928 Summer Olympics in Amsterdam, he placed third in the decathlon with a score of 7,706.65 behind Paavo Yrjölä (8,053.29 points) and Akilles Järvinen (7,624.135 points). Doherty was in fifth place for most of the Olympic competition, but moved into third as a result of his performance in the javelin throw and running the 1,500 meters in 4 minutes, 54 seconds.

Doherty capped his career as a decathlete in 1929 when he repeated as AAU champion in Denver with an American record score of 7,784.68 points. Sports writer Paul Lowry wrote about Doherty's record-setting performance: "Ken Doherty broke the record in the decathlon – ten of the most grueling events imaginable, and all run off on the same day." Doherty reported that he felt fresh after the 1929 decathlon championship taking in a banquet and motion-picture show the night after the competition and arising the next day "to make a 350-mile auto trip without a feeling of strain or exhaustion." Doherty's trip to Denver for the 1929 also doubled as a honeymoon tour with his wife of a few weeks.

== Track coach ==
=== University of Michigan ===
Doherty, described as "a lean, quiet Scot," retired from competition in 1929 and accepted a position as a coach at Detroit Southwestern High School in 1929. He next accepted a position as an assistant track coach at Princeton University where he worked under the school's legendary track coach Keene Fitzpatrick in 1929–1930. In 1930, Doherty was hired by the University of Michigan as its assistant track coach serving under the Wolverines' new head coach, Charles B. Hoyt. He remained Hoyt's assistant for nine years and took over as Michigan's head track coach in 1939 when Hoyt accepted a job at Yale. Doherty served nine years as Michigan's head coach, leading Michigan to seven Big Ten Conference championships (four indoor and three outdoor). In his 18 years as an assistant and head coach at Michigan, he coached some of the schools all-time great athletes, including the following:

- Eddie Tolan – set the world record in the 100-yard dash and won Olympic gold medals at the 1932 Summer Olympics in the 100-meter and 200-meter runs.
- Sam Stoller – one of two Jews on the American track team at the 1936 Berlin Olympics; controversy sparked when he was pulled from the 4 x 100 meter relay event
- William Watson – won 12 individual Big Ten Conference championships, including three consecutive championships (1937–1939) in the long jump, discus and shot put; first African-American to win the AAU decathlon championship in 1940
- Elmer Gedeon – tied a world record in the high hurdles in 1938; shot down and killed while piloting a B-26 bomber on a mission over France in April 1944.
- Willis Ward – collegiate champion in the high jump, long jump, 100-yard dash, and 400-yard dash; finished second in voting for AP Big Ten Athlete of the Year in 1933; second African-American to letter in football at Michigan.
- Bob Osgood – set a world record in the 120-yard high hurdles in 1937 and Big Ten champion in 1936 and 1937
- Robert H. Hume and H. Ross Hume – the "dead heat twins" who were champions in the mile and regularly finished their races holding hands in dead heat victories.
- Bob Ufer – set the world indoor record in the 440 yards and later the radio voice of Michigan football
- Don Canham – All-America who won the 1940 NCAA title in the high jump and was both the indoor and outdoor Big Ten Conference champion in both 1940 and 1941; succeeded Doherty as Michigan's track coach and became a school legend as its athletic director in 1968–1988
- Charlie Fonville – NCAA shot put champion in 1947 and 1948; set world record in 1948

Doherty earned a Ph.D. degree in educational psychology from the University of Michigan in 1948.

=== University of Pennsylvania ===
In April 1948, Doherty accepted the job as track coach at the University of Pennsylvania At Penn, Doherty developed track stars, including Dick Hart, Charles Emermy, Willie Lee and John Haines. Doherty drew national publicity in February 1957 when he suspended 20-year-old runner (and future movie star) Bruce Dern from the Penn track team. Dern drew Doherty's ire for his sideburns that a United Press reporter compared to those of Elvis Presley. It was reported that "the bobby-soxers squealed and howled and shrieked, 'Go, Elvis, go!' when Dern ran on Penn's two-mile relay team." Doherty insisted that Dern shave, and Dern declined. In removing Dern from the track team, Doherty refused to say the sideburns were the cause and instead told a reporter: "He preferred not to continue with the team is the best way of putting it. Team members are expected to be representatives of the university and this applies to many things. Obviously, any man who can't live up to these things automatically puts himself off the team." Press accounts at the time noted that Dern's father was a Chicago lawyer and a University of Pennsylvania Trustee. An associate of Doherty recalled Doherty as "a very thorough man with a stubborn streak." When Doherty kicked Dern off the team after he refused to cut his hair, Fabricus recalled that people told him, "You can't do that. His father is a trustee." But, according to Doherty's associate, "Ken said he had ground rules, and that was that."

In May 1957, three months after the negative publicity resulting from the Dern incident, Doherty announced his retirement after nine years as Penn's coach. Doherty stated at the time that he wanted to free up his time to devote himself to more intensive planning of the relays.

== Meet director ==
After retiring as a track coach, Doherty devoted himself to work as a meet director. In 1956–1969, Doherty served as the meet director for the Penn Relays, a three-day event that became known as "the world's largest track and field carnival." From 1959 to 1967, he was also the meet director of The Philadelphia Inquirer Games, a major indoor track and field competition. In 1959, he was the meet director for the first dual meet between the United States and the Soviet Union. He was also the meet director for the 1961 NCAA Outdoor Championships. In addition to his work as a meet director, Doherty conducted track clinics in the Soviet Union, Finland, Canada and India.

== Author ==
He was also the author of articles and popular books on coaching track and field. In 1941, he published the book Solving Camp Behavior Problems based on his work as a director of the Boys' Camp at the National Music Camp in Michigan. In 1953, he published Modern Track & Field. His most popular work was the multi-edition Track & Field Omnibook, first published in 1971 and "generally regarded as the track coach's bible." The Omnibook, published in four editions and in print until 1995, was the first comprehensive book on track coaching; it went beyond technique and also covered sports psychology and methods of motivation. Doherty's books were translated into Russian, Finnish, Spanish and Japanese.

It has been said that Doherty had "more knowledge about track and field techniques than any man of his generation." When the Track and Field Hall of Fame Library was established at Butler University, Doherty donated his collection to the library, which included thousands of books, periodicals and manuscripts related to the history of track and field in the United States; the collection was moved to the library of the AAFLA in Los Angeles in 2001 where it is open for public view.

== Honors ==
Doherty has received many honors for his achievements in the world of track and field, including the following:

- Inducted into the Helms Track and Field Hall of Fame in 1961.
- Inducted in the University of Michigan Men's Track Hall of Fame in 1970.
- Inducted into the National Track and Field Hall of Fame in 1976.
- Inducted into the Wayne State University Athletic Hall of Fame in 1977.
- Inducted into the University of Pennsylvania Athletics Hall of Fame in 1998.
- Inducted into the U.S. Track & Field and Cross Country Coaches Association Hall of Fame in 2001.
- An annual fellowship in Doherty's name is administered by the Amateur Athletic Foundation of Los Angeles.

Doherty also served as President of the National Track and Field Coaches Association in 1956 and became a fellow of the American College of Sports Medicine in 1957. Prior to his induction into the National Track and Field Hall of Fame, Doherty had been chairman of the selection committee for two years. He was inducted the year after he stepped down from the committee and, on his selection, Doherty said:

Each part of my career has its own significance to me. I look back at the decathlon, which at that time was not as popular as it is today. My coaching, well, it was great working with the boys. My books are more important than anything to me now. And being recognized by those within my sport is the greatest compliment I could hope for.

== Family and death ==
Doherty died in 1996 at age 90 in Lancaster, Pennsylvania, three years after his wife Lucile Mason. They had two sons, Dr. Lynn M. Doherty and Dr. Robert W. Doherty, and five grandchildren: Robert G. Doherty, Kathryn Doherty, Ian Doherty, Michael Doherty, and Sue Ann Doherty.
