= 1925 NCAA Track and Field Championships =

International athletics event

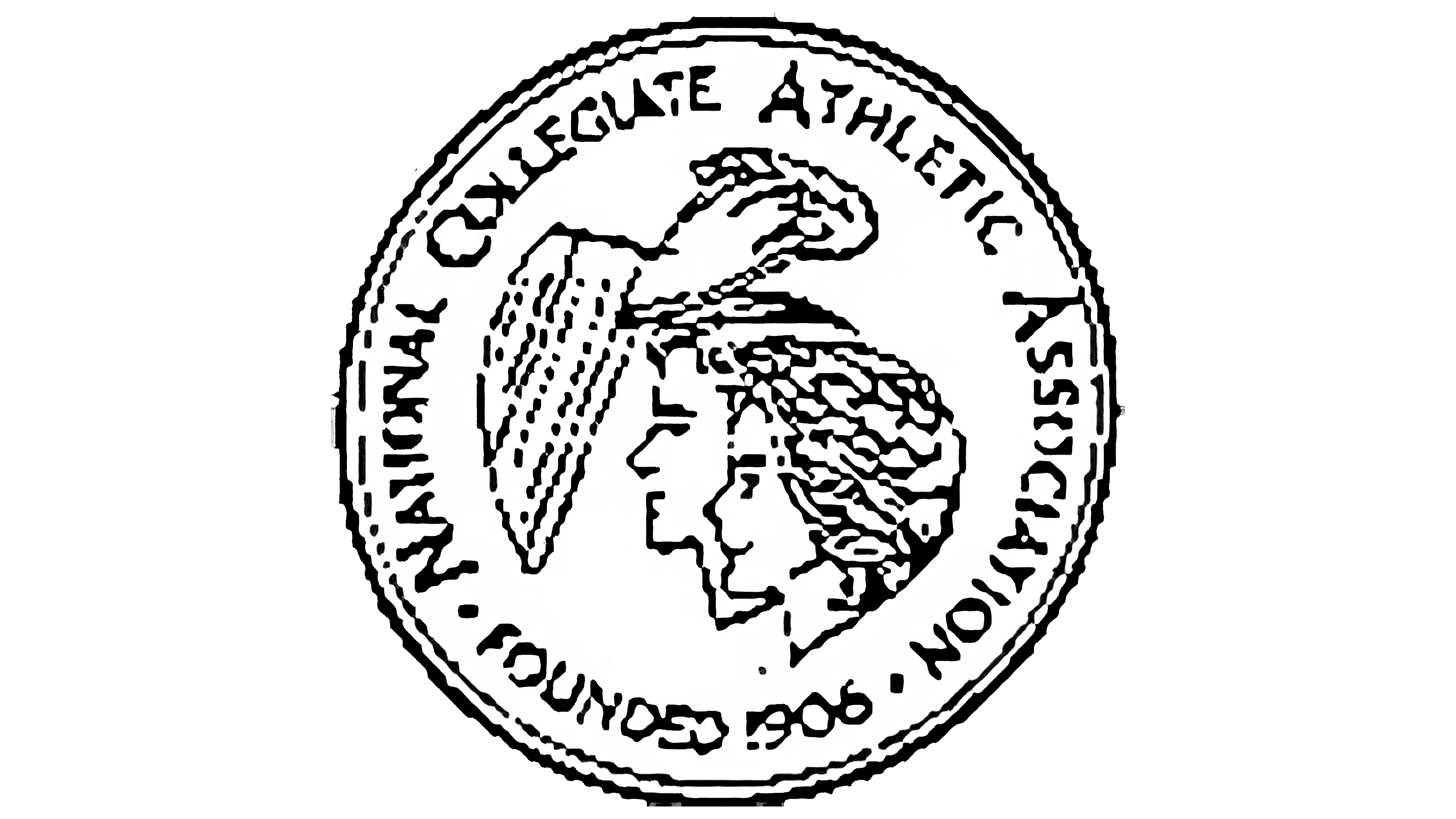
- Team Champion: Stanford (1st title)
- Edition: 4th
- Dates: June 12-13, 1925
- Host city: (Illinois) Chicago, Illinois; University of Chicago
- Venue: Stagg Field
- Events: 14

The 1925 NCAA Track and Field Championships was the fourth NCAA track and field championship. The event was held at Stagg Field in Chicago, Illinois in June 1925. Stanford University won the team title, and six NCAA records were set at the two-day meet.

== Overview ==
The 1925 NCAA Track and Field Championships were held at Stagg Field in Chicago on June 13 and 14, 1925. In a field of more than 400 athletes from 62 colleges and universities, Stanford University won the team title with 39 1/2 points, and the University of Michigan finished second with 33-1/5 points.

The track team from the University of Southern California won the Eastern Inter-collegiate meet, but the school did not send its team to the NCAA meet. Stanford had previously beaten the USC team in that year's Pacific Coast championship.

One of the highlights of the 1925 NCAA meet was the performance of DeHart Hubbard, an African-American athlete from the University of Michigan. In his final collegiate meet, Hubbard set a new world record in the broad jump with a jump of 25 feet, 10 7/8 inches. Hubbard had set the world record in the event in 1923, but Robert LeGendre had surpassed Hubbard's record at the 1924 Summer Olympics in Paris. At the 1925 NCAA meet, Hubbard broke LeGendre's record by more than four inches. The Associated Press wrote that the crowd was thrilled by DeHart's leap, which experts predicted would "Stand for All Time":

"Competing under the colors of the University of Michigan for the last time, Dehart Hubbard ... today achieved the ambition of his athletic career when he smashed the world's record for the running broad jump ... Hubbard achieved his record breaking leap on his very last jump as he had reached the end of his trials. ... Pulling off his sweater, the 21 year old negro flash swiftly got away to a perfect start, cleared the take-off with perfect form, and sent his body hurdling thru space kicking his legs in scissor fashion just before his feet hit the earth.

Hubbard also won the 100-yard dash at the 1925 NCAA meet with a time of 9.8 seconds to set a new NCAA record in that event.

In the shot put event, Hartranft of Stanford broke the NCAA and international collegiate record with a toss of 50 feet—one foot short of the world record. Hoffman of Stanford also set a new record in the discus with a throw of 148 feet, 4 inches.

In the half-mile race, J. Charteris of Washington State set a new NCAA record with a time of 1:55.8.

== Team scoring ==
- (H) = Hosts

Rank	Team	Points
1st place, gold medalist(s)	Stanford	39 1/2
2nd place, silver medalist(s)	Michigan	33 1/5
3rd place, bronze medalist(s)	California	19 1/6
4	Ohio State	19
5	Grinnell	18
6	Iowa; Missouri	16
8	Montana	14
9	Butler; Oklahoma; Illinois	12

== Track events ==
100-yard dash
1. DeHart Hubbard - 9.8 seconds (new NCAA record)

2. Sweet, Montana
3. Wittman, Michigan
4. Foster, Virginia Military
5. Roberta, Iowa

120-yard high hurdles
1. Hugo Leistner, Stanford, 14.6

220-yard dash
1. Glen Gray, Butler - 21.9 seconds
2. Sweet, Montana
3. Alderman, Michigan Aggies
4. Barber, California
5. Foster, Virginia Military

220-yard low hurdles
1. Morgan Taylor, Grinnell - 24 seconds
2. Leistner, Stanford
3. Guthrie, Ohio State
4. Kinsey, Illinois
5. Maxwell, Pomona

440-yard dash
1. Hermon Phillips, Butler - 49.4 seconds
2. Johnson, California
3. Miller, Stanford
4. Schoch, Illinois
5. Coulter, Iowa

880-yard run
1. James Charteris, Washington - 1:55.4 (new NCAA record)
2. Richardson, Stanford
3. Martin Northwestern
4. Frank, Oklahoma
5. Boyden, California

One-mile run
1. Jim Reese, Texas - 4:18.8 (new NCAA record)
2. Carter, Occidental
3. Gillette, Montana
4. Conger, Ames
5. Kimport, Kansas Aggies

Two-mile run
1. John Devine, Washington State - 9:32.8

== Field events ==
Broad jump
1. DeHart Hubbard, Michigan - 25 feet, 10 7/8 inches (new world record)
2. Morgan Taylor, Grinnell - 24 feet, 2 3/8 inches
3. Wallace, Illinois - 23 feet 8 3/4 inches
4. Jones, Iowa - 23 feet, 1 1/2 inches
5. Fell, Illinois - 22 feet, 4 1/2 inches

High jump
1. Thomas Bransford, Missouri - 6 feet, 2 inches
1. Justin Russell, Chicago - 6 feet, 2 inches
1. Oather Hampton, California - 6 feet, 2 inches
4. Tom Poor, Kansas - 6 feet
4. Tom Work, Stanford - 6 feet

Pole vault
1. Phil Northrup, Michigan - 12 feet, 4 inches
1. Frank Potts, Oklahoma - 12 feet, 4 inches
1. Earl McKown, Kansas State - 12 feet, 4 inches
1. Royal Bouschor, Northwestern - 12 feet, 4 inches
1. Kenneth Lancaster, Missouri - 12 feet, 4 inches

Discus throw
1. Clifford Hoffman, Stanford - 148 feet, 4 inches (new NCAA record)
2. Hartranft, Stanford - 143 feet, 2 inches
3. Doyle, Michigan - 139 feet, 9 inches
4. Richerson, Missouri - 130 feet, 7 inches
5. Reinefort, Grinnell - 130 feet, 2 inches

Javelin
1. Phil Northrup, Michigan - 201 feet, 11 inches
2. Cox, Oklahoma - 197 feet
3. Good, McKendree - 187 feet, 3 inches
4. Eaton, Pomona - 186 feet, 10 inches
5. Kreuze Washington - 182 feet, 7 inches

Shot put
1. Glenn Hartranft, Stanford - 50 feet (new intercollegiate record)
2. Gerkin, California - 47 feet, 3 inches
3. Scharze, Wisconsin - 46 feet, 11 3/4 inches
4. Richerson, Missouri - 45 feet, 0 3/4 inches
5. Rinefort, Grinnell - 45 feet, 1 1/4 inches

Hammer throw
1. Ray Bunker, Ohio State - 150 feet, 1 1-2 inches
2. Ted Cox, Minnesota - 138 feet, 2 inches
3. Herritt, Pomona - 135 feet 2 1/2 inches
4. Lyons, Amherst - 131 feet, 6 1/2 inches
5. Handy, Iowa - 130 feet, 4 inches

== See also ==
- NCAA Men's Outdoor Track and Field Championship
