= Phil Northrup =

American track and field athlete

Philip Northrup
- Northrup in 1927
- Born: 1904
- Died: 1963 (aged 58–59)
- Known for: NCAA champion, javelin throw (1925, 1926); NCAA champion, pole vault, 1925

Philip M. Northrup (1904 – 1963) was an American track and field athlete. He won the NCAA javelin championship in 1925 and 1926 and tied for the NCAA championship in the pole vault in 1925.

== Biography ==
Northrup grew up in Detroit, Michigan where he attended Northwestern High School. In 1923, he won the state high school championship in the long jump with a distance of 21 feet, 7 inches.

After graduating from high school, Northrup enrolled at the University of Michigan where he competed in track and field for the school's famous track coach, Stephen Farrell.

As a sophomore in 1925, Northrup won the javelin throw event at the Penn Relays, the Big Ten Conference championship, and the NCAA championships. He also competed for Michigan in the long jump and pole vault. His versatility led the press to report:

"In Philip Northrup, Michigan has a most versatile athlete. He stars in the broad jump, javelin throw and pole vault. ... Coach Steve Farrell of the Maize and Blue school rates Northrup one of the best all-round men he has had in some time, with the possible exception of Hubbard, the great colored ace."

Northrup's performance at the 1925 Big Ten outdoor meet held in Columbus, Ohio helped lead the Michigan track team to the conference championship as he accounted for 9-1/2 points. At the meet, Northrup won the javelin and set a new conference record in the event. He also finished fourth in the long jump and tied with three others for third in the pole vault.

At the 1925 NCAA Men's Track and Field Championships, he helped Michigan take second place as the Wolverines narrowly lost the team title to Stanford. At the NCAA championships, Northrup won the event championship in the javelin throw (201 feet, 11 inches) and tied for first in the pole vault (12 feet, 4 inches).

As a junior in May 1926, Northrup led Michigan to another Big Ten track and field championship. Northrup accounted for 12-1/2 points at the conference championship by winning the javelin throw, tying for first in the pole vault and finishing third in the long jump. Northrup's javelin throw of 207 feet, 7-3/8 inches, set a new conference record. Northrup's Big Ten record in the javelin throw stood until 1933 when Duane Purvis of Purdue recorded a distance of 208 feet, 5-1/4 inches.

Northrup also retained his national title in the javelin at the 1926 NCAA track and field championships with a winning throw of 200 feet, 10 inches.

In 1927, Northrup was selected by his teammates as the captain of Michigan's track team. At the 1927 Penn Relays, Northrup won the javelin throw and finished second in the long jump to 1928 Olympic gold medalist Ed Hamm of Georgia Tech. At the 1927 Big Ten meet, Northrup finished third in the javelin as his Michigan teammate Lovette won the event with a throw of 181 feet, 1 inch.

Northrup graduated from the University of Michigan School of Dentistry in 1928 and became an oral surgeon. He also served on the faculty of the University of Michigan from 1935 to 1963. He died in 1963 at age 59.

In 2007, Northrup was selected for the University of Michigan Track & Field Hall of Fame.

== See also ==
- University of Michigan Track & Field Hall of Fame
- 1925 NCAA Men's Track and Field Championships
- 1926 NCAA Men's Track and Field Championships
