= Ron Kutschinski =

American middle-distance runner

Ronald Craig Kutschinski (born August 28, 1947, in Grand Rapids, Michigan) is an American middle-distance runner who competed in the 1968 Summer Olympics.

Kutschinski competed for the Michigan Wolverines track and field team in the NCAA.
