= Charles B. Hoyt =

American sprinter and coach

- Hoyt from the 1925 Michiganensian
- Born: October 9, 1893; Greenfield, Iowa, U.S.
- Died: 1978
- Years active: 1913–1946
- Known for: Track athlete and coach

Charles B. Hoyt (October 9, 1893 – 1978) was an American track athlete and coach.

== Champion sprinter ==
A native of Greenfield, Iowa, Hoyt won three straight 100 and 220 yard dashes in the Iowa state meet from 1911–1913 and won seven career gold medals. As a high school student in 1912, Hoyt was offered a place on the U.S. Olympic team but turned down the chance. He ran a nation’s best of 9.8 in 1913—the same year the Amateur Athletic Union called him "America’s best sprinter." His 9.8 time was equaled by Bill Carter of Chicago in 1914 but was not bettered until 1932 when Foy Draper of California ran 9.6. After graduating early from high school, Hoyt enrolled at Grinnell College where he set a world record in the 220-yard dash on a curved track at the 1916 Drake Relays. He won intercollegiate championships in both the 100-yard and 220-yard runs, but lost the opportunity to compete in the Olympics when the 1916 Summer Olympics was cancelled due to World War I. He graduated from Grinnell College in 1917 and served in the United States Navy during World War I.

== Track coach ==
=== Grinnell College and Sioux City High School ===
After his service in the Navy, Hoyt coached track at Sioux City High School, where he trained Morgan Taylor, the first Olympic champion from Iowa. He next later became the athletic director at Sioux City (Central) High School. Morgan Taylor later attended Hoyt's alma mater, Grinnell College, where he set many records before winning three medals in the 400 hurdles at the Olympics in 1924 (Gold), 1928 (Bronze), and 1932 (bronze), where Taylor was also the flag carrier for the United States team.

=== University of Michigan ===
He was hired by the University of Michigan in 1923 as the assistant track coach and trainer of the football team. In 1930, he became Michigan's head track coach. In his ten years as Michigan's head coach (1930–1939), Hoyt's Michigan track teams won 14 of a possible 20 Big Ten Conference indoor and outdoor titles, including six straight indoor championships from 1934-1939. With Hoyt as head coach, Michigan was 40-6-0 in dual meets. His Michigan athletes also won five individual NCAA championships and 63 individual Big Ten championships (27 indoor and 33 outdoor). The athletes Hoyt coached at Michigan include:

- Philip Northrup - a three-time NCAA champion and four-time All-American, in the javelin throw and pole vault, (1925–27). Northrup was inducted to the University of Michigan Athletic Hall of Fame in 2007.
- Eddie Tolan - set the world record in the 100-yard dash and won Olympic gold medals at the 1932 Summer Olympics in the 100-meter and 200-meter run.
- Sam Stoller - one of two Jews on the American track team at the 1936 Berlin Olympics; controversy sparked when he was pulled from the 4 x 100-meter relay event
- William Watson - won 12 individual Big Ten Conference championships, including three consecutive championships (1937–1939) in the long jump, discus and shot put; first African-American to win the AAU decathlon championship in 1940
- Elmer Gedeon - tied a world record in the high hurdles in 1938; shot down and killed while piloting a B-26 bomber on a mission over France in April 1944.
- Willis Ward - collegiate champion in the high jump, long jump, 100-yard dash, and 400-yard dash; finished second in voting for AP Big Ten Athlete of the Year in 1933; second African-American to letter in football at Michigan.
- Bob Osgood - set a world record in the 120-yard high hurdles in May 1937; won Big Ten Conference championship in the event in both 1936 and 1937.

=== Yale University ===
In 1939, he was hired by Yale University as the school's track coach and trainer of its football team. He remained track coach at Yale until 1946 when he was replaced by Robert Giegengack.

== Later life and honors ==
After leaving Yale, Hoyt lived in Woolstock, Iowa where he operated large farm holdings. In 1948, Hoyt was selected as the referee for the 48th annual Western Conference track and field meet. He was inducted into the Helms Foundation Track Hall of Fame in 1949 and the Iowa Sports Hall of Fame in 1955.

Preceded by Archie Hahn	Michigan Wolverines football trainer 1923–1929	Succeeded by Ray Roberts
Preceded by Ray Roberts	Michigan Wolverines football trainer 1941–1942	Succeeded by Ray Roberts
