= Don Canham =

American athletics coach and administrator (1918–2005)

- Don Canham c. 1950

Biographical details
- Born: April 27, 1918; Chicago, Illinois, U.S.
- Died: May 3, 2005 (aged 87); Ann Arbor, Michigan, U.S.

Playing career
- 1940–1941: Michigan
- Position(s): High jumper

Coaching career (HC unless noted)
- 1950–1968: Michigan

Administrative career (AD unless noted)
- 1968–1988: Michigan

Head coaching record
- Overall: 52–13–2

Accomplishments and honors

Championships
- 7 Big Ten indoor (1955, 1956, 1959, 1960, 1961, 1963, 1964); 4 Big Ten outdoor (1955, 1956, 1961, 1962)

Donald Burrell Canham (April 27, 1918 – May 3, 2005) was a track and field athlete and coach and college athletics administrator. He served as the athletic director at the University of Michigan from 1968 to 1988. There, he became nationally renowned for his ability to market and sell products bearing the name or logo of the school. In December 1968, he hired Bo Schembechler as head football coach, beginning a new era of success for Michigan's football program. The combination of Canham's aggressive marketing efforts and Schembechler's winning teams helped Michigan set many national attendance records at Michigan Stadium. Since 1975, the school has sold over 100,000 tickets for every home football game—a string of more than 200 contests.

== Education ==
At the University of Michigan, Canham was an athlete for the Michigan Wolverines men's track and field team, earning All-American honors by winning the 1940 NCAA title in the high jump and was both the indoor and outdoor Big Ten Conference champion in both 1940 and 1941.

Canham completed his bachelor's degree in physical education, history, and science at Michigan in 1941 and Master of Arts degree at Michigan in 1948.

== Coach ==
From 1947 to 1968, he served as the school's head track coach. His teams won 11 Big Ten Conference championships, seven indoor and four outdoor. He left the post after 21 seasons to become the school's athletic director.

== Athletic director ==
One of Canham's first priorities upon being named athletic director was to address the dwindling attendance at Michigan home football games, which by 1967 had declined to an average of 67,000 fans per game. Canham's good friend, Notre Dame athletic director Moose Krause, knew a sure-fire way to fill Michigan Stadium — by playing Notre Dame. The Fighting Irish and the Wolverines had not met on the gridiron since 1943 when Fritz Crisler, Michigan's then football coach and athletic director until 1968 when Canham succeeded him, became so incensed at the intensity of Notre Dame's Frank Leahy that he never scheduled Notre Dame again. Canham and Krause worked out an agreement to renew the series, which resumed in 1978 and ended in 2014.

Canham had Tartan Turf installed in Michigan Stadium to replace its grass playing surface in 1969. The school continued to use similar artificial fields until 1990. This accounts for Canham's mention in Michigan radio sportscaster Bob Ufer's quote for the stadium: "(It’s) the hole that Yost dug, Crisler paid for, Canham carpeted and Schembechler fills every cotton-pickin’ Saturday afternoon!"

In 1982, Canham was reported to be leading a group of investors looking to purchase the Detroit Red Wings of the National Hockey League. Canham had preliminary meetings with the Norris family, although the franchise was eventually sold to Mike Ilitch.

Canham was alleged to have covered up sexual assaults by university doctor Robert Anderson. Former announcer Richard Goldman reported Anderson's repeated rapes to Canham in 1981, 1982, and 1983 and was ignored all three times and was told, "go f--- yourself"

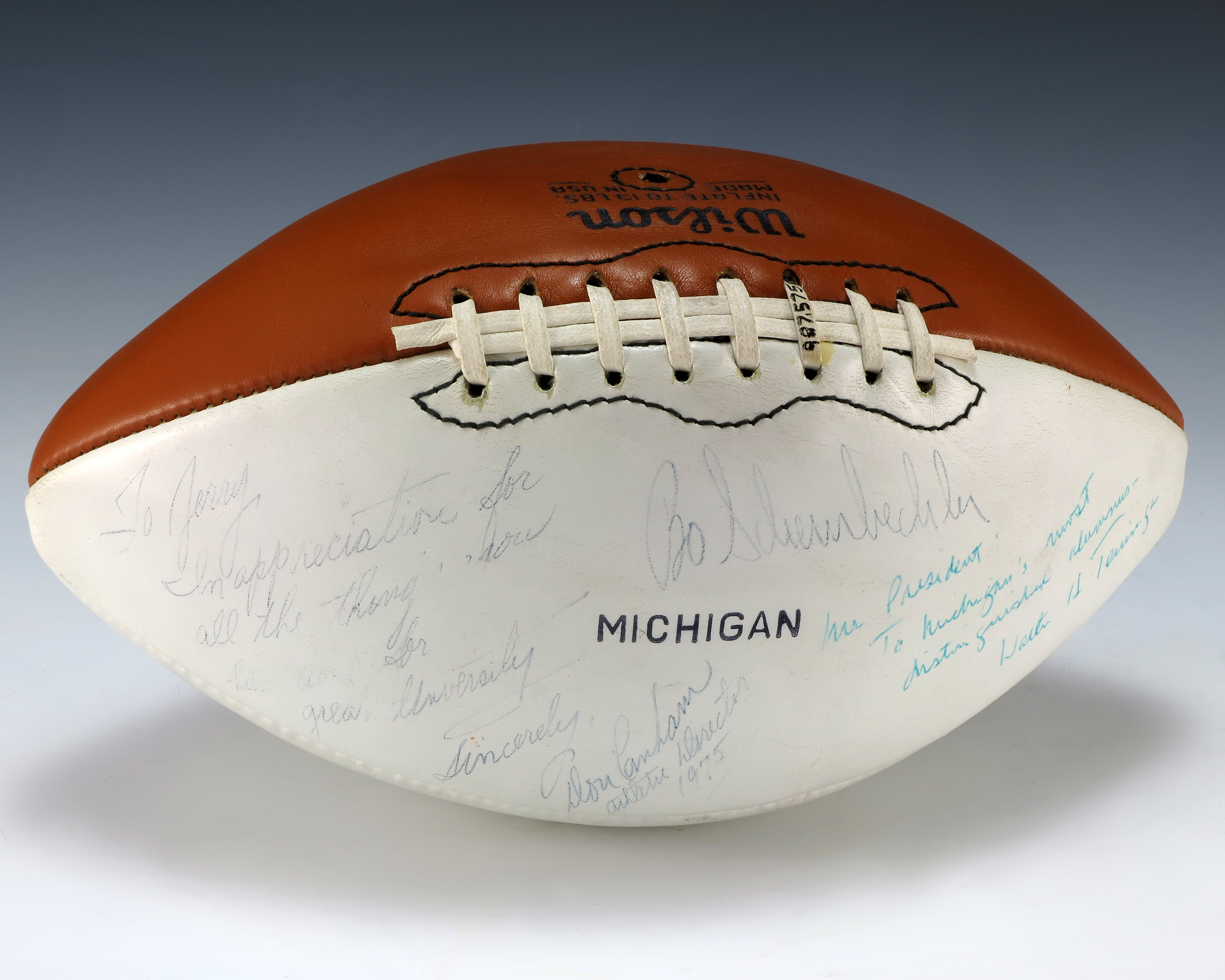
A football signed by Canham, Bo Schembechler, and Wally Teninga that was gifted to President Gerald Ford.

== Retirement and death ==
Michigan's swimming and diving and women's water polo teams compete in the Donald B. Canham Natatorium, named for Canham upon his retirement in 1988.

Canham died May 3, 2005, at the age of 87 after rupturing his abdominal aorta. Canham was preceded in death by his first wife, Marilyn, and was survived by his second wife, Margaret, his brother, Robert Canham, his son, Don Canham Jr., his daughter Clare Eaton, and grandchildren, Amelia and Donnie Eaton.

== See also ==
- University of Michigan Athletic Hall of Honor
