= Don McEwen =

American distance runner

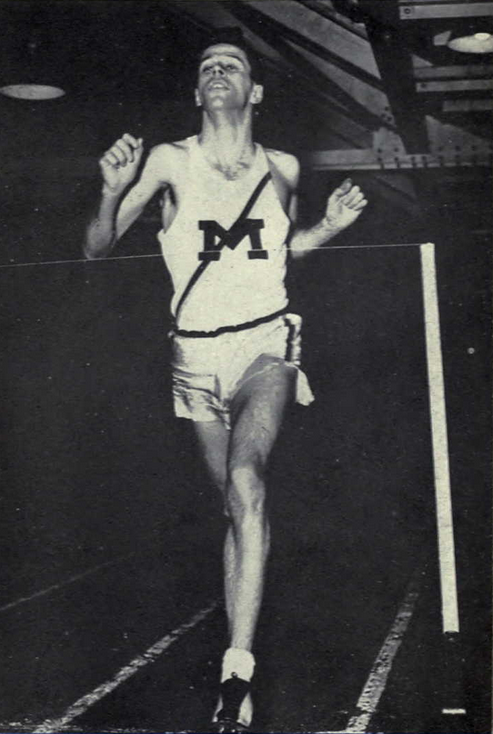
- McEwen breaking world indoor two-mile record
- Citizenship: United States
- Education: University of Michigan
- Occupation: Athlete
- Known for: NCAA champion, two-mile run (1950 and 1951)

Don McEwen (born 14 August 1928) is a former track and field athlete. He was a two-time NCAA champion in the two-mile run.

== Track competition ==
While competing for the University of Michigan, he won consecutive NCAA men's track and field championships in the two-mile race. In 1950, McEwen won the NCAA championship with a time of 9 minutes, 1.9 seconds. In 1951, he repeated as the NCAA champion with a time of 9 minutes, 3.2 seconds. His two-mile time of 9:01.9 in 1950 set a new NCAA record.

McEwen also won six Big Ten Conference individual championships in track. His Big Ten championships include consecutive championships in the two-mile run (1950 with a time of 9:13 and 1951 with a time of 9:23.8) and a championship in the one-mile run (1951 with a time of 4:09.0).

Although the University of Michigan did not have a varsity cross country team at the time, McEwen also competed in cross country while attending the school. He won consecutive Big Ten Conference cross country championships. Competing in the four-mile cross country race, McEwen won the 1949 championship with a time of 19 minutes, 44.5 seconds and repeated as champion in 1950 with a time of 19 minutes, 34.3 seconds.

In 1952 McEwen anchored the Michigan team that set a world record in the distance medley relay, knocking three seconds off the previous record with a time of 9:56.3 minutes alongside teammates Aaron Gordon, Jack Carroll and John Ross.

McEwen, was “thought to have legitimate medal prospects in the 5000 meters” at the 1952 Summer Olympics in Helsinki, but he was unable to compete in the games because of an injury.

In 1953, McEwen graduated from the University of Michigan Business School with a bachelor's degree in business administration.

== Later years ==
After graduating, McEwen became a sales trainee for Shell Oil of Canada. In 1955, he became a track coach. He was hired by the Ann Arbor Public Schools in 1958 as a math teacher and assistant track coach. He also became the cross country coach at Ann Arbor’s Pioneer High School. In 1962, McEwen stopped coaching and became a full-time education and vocational counselor at Pioneer High School.

McEwen was inducted in the University of Michigan Athletic Hall of Honor in 1988, and into the Michigan Men’s Track and Field Hall of Fame as part of the second group of inductees in 2007. In February 2008, McEwen’s record for the fastest two-mile time in a dual meet between Michigan and Ohio State (9:04.6) was broken after standing for 55 years. McEwen was present at the Michigan Indoor Track Building as a volunteer timer when Michigan sophomore Sean McNamara broke McEwen’s record by approximately eight seconds. At the time, McEwen told the Ann Arbor Press: "He ran well. I'm just glad he wasn't an Ohio State guy."

== See also ==
- University of Michigan Athletic Hall of Honor
