= Bob Osgood =

American track and field athlete

- Photograph of Bob Osgood, Wisconsin State Journal, May 22, 1937
- Born: April 21, 1915
- Died: July 24, 1990 (aged 75)
- Other name: Robert D. Osgood
- Known for: Set world record in the 120-yard high hurdles, May 1937

Robert D. Osgood (April 21, 1915 – July 24, 1990) was an American track and field athlete who set a world record in the 120-yard high hurdles in May 1937 with a time of 14 seconds flat. He also won the Big Ten Conference championship in the event in both 1936 and 1937. He was inducted into the University of Michigan Athletic Hall of Honor in 1983.

== Early years in Ohio ==
Osgood was a native of Lakewood, Ohio, where he was a state track champion in the 120-yard high hurdles. He graduated from Lakewood High School in 1933.

== University of Michigan ==
Osgood enrolled at the University of Michigan in 1934 where he ran track under renowned Michigan Track Coach Charles B. Hoyt. At the 1936 Big Ten Conference track championship, Osgood won the 120-yard high hurdles in 1936 with a time of 14.2 seconds. His time in the high hurdles tied Percy Beard's world record of 14.2 seconds." He also placed second to Jesse Owens in the low hurdles. The 1936 race between Osgood and Owens is one of the most told stories about Jesse Owens. Owens started badly and was in last place (trailing by 18 to 20 yards). Osgood was leading and reportedly said that when Owens passed him, "it sounded like a thunderstorm."

At the end of the 1936 track season, Osgood was selected as the captain for the 1937 team.

== World record in the 120-yard high hurdles ==
The 1937 Michigan track team led by Osgood won the Big Ten Conference championship. At the Big Ten championship held in May 1937 at Ferry Field in Ann Arbor, Osgood broke the world's record for the 120-yard high hurdles with a time of 14.0 seconds, one-tenth of a second under the previous world record set by 1936 Olympic gold medalist, Forrest Towns. The University of Michigan yearbook for 1937 noted that the race was run in the "driving rain, which soon turned the track into a miniature lake," requiring the athletes to splash their way "through the mud." The New York Times reported on Osgood's accomplishment as follows: "Captain Robert D. Osgood, a lanky senior from Lakewood, Ohio, scissored over the 120-yard high hurdles in the dazzling world-record time of 14 seconds today to embellish a smashing Michigan team triumph in the thirty-seventh annual Western Conference track and field championship meet."

Osgood's world record performance was cited at the end of 1937 as one of the highlights of the year's track season. One columnist described the performance as follows: "Driving through a sheet of rain that beat into his face with every stride, Bob Osgood shattered everything that had ever been done before in the 120-yard high hurdles in winning the Big Ten championship at Ann Arbor in 14 flat. This under miserable conditions on a wet and slow track." Another columnist noted that the "bespectacled young man" had set the record "in the rain and puddles of water," and asked, "What might Bob Osgood have done if the cinders had been dry and fast with no drizzle beating into his face?"

Osgood's world record was broken in April 1938 when Rice Institute's Fred Wolcott ran the 120-yard high hurdles with a downwind burst of 13.9 seconds.

== Honors ==
Osgood was inducted into the University of Michigan Athletic Hall of Honor in 1983. And in 1992, he was also posthumously inducted into the Lakewood Athletic Hall of Fame.
