= William Watson (decathlete) =

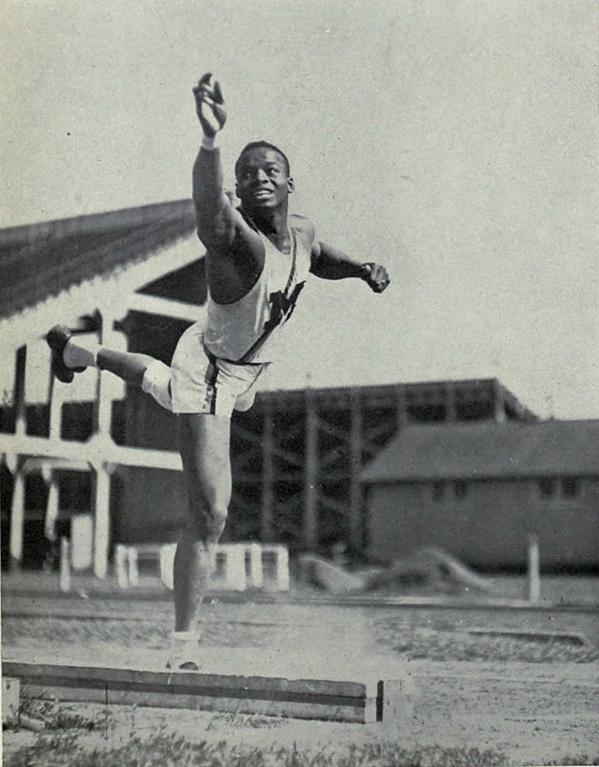
Watson from 1938 Michiganensian

William Delouis Watson (December 18, 1916 – 1973), also known as Big Bill Watson, was an American track and field athlete. Watson was the Amateur Athletic Union (A.A.U.) decathlon champion in 1940 and 1943. He was the first African-American to win the U.S. decathlon championship and the first African-American to be selected as the captain of any athletic team at the University of Michigan, being selected as the captain of the Michigan track team in 1939. While at Michigan, Watson won 12 individual Big Ten Conference championships, including three consecutive championships (1937–1939) in the long jump, discus and shot put. He served as a police officer for the Detroit Police Department for 25 years from the early 1940s until his retirement in 1966. Watson was posthumously inducted into the University of Michigan Athletic Hall of Honor in 1982.

== Early years ==
Watson was born in 1916 in Boley, Oklahoma. He moved with his family to Saginaw, Michigan, at age seven. He was one of the most outstanding athletes in the history of Saginaw High School. Originally, Watson intended to become a boxer and took up track as a means to improve his fitness. His biography at the Saginaw County Sports Hall of Fame describes his high school accomplishments as follows:

He was discovered in a gym class at Saginaw High School by coach Chester R. Sackhouse, who had 50 boys high jumping a cross bar with Watson bouncing over it with several feet to spare. Watson was called a one-man track team at Saginaw High and also toiled in football and basketball for the Trojans. The 6 ft. 200 pounder was known for his muscular physique and set shot put, broad jump and high jump records while at Saginaw High. His toss of 53-10 3/8 in the shot put established a new state meet record ...

== University of Michigan ==
After graduating from Saginaw High School, Watson enrolled in 1935 at the University of Michigan, where he competed in track under famed track coach Charles B. Hoyt. Watson's first year of competition came as a sophomore in 1937. The 1937 Big Ten Track Championship was held in Ann Arbor in the rain, and Watson won championships in the long jump, shot put and discus, and also excelled in sprints and high hurdles. Watson's effort helped Michigan to the conference championship.

During Watson's three years competing on the track team, Michigan was referred to by the Associated Press as the "Yankees" of the Western Conference track, and Coach Hoyt called the 1939 team captained by Watson "his greatest Michigan team." In his sophomore, junior and senior years, Watson dominated his events, winning Big Ten Championships in the long jump, shot put and discus three straight years from 1937-1939. In all, Watson won 12 individual championships in six track seasons (three indoor and three outdoor) competing for the University of Michigan. He also set several University of Michigan and Big Ten Conference records, including a discus record of 160-10 5/8. The Associated Press called Watson a "finely proportioned negro" and "the big gun to watch in Michigan's powerhouse array of talent." Watson was so dominant in so many events that he became known as "the University of Michigan's one-man track team." Watson's coach, Charles Hoyt, attributed Watson's amazing ability to "speed and an infinite capacity for detail." Hoyt noted that Watson spent hours at a time perfecting timing and improving muscle co-ordination and noted, "Very few athletes display such patience and willingness to learn."

In Watson's senior year, his teammates elected him as the captain of the track team, making him the first African-American ever to be elected as the captain of any team in the 102-year history of the University of Michigan. Personally, press accounts described Watson as "quiet and unassuming, intelligent, a high-ranking student," with "a thorough social understanding."

== Olympic hopeful and decathlon champion ==
As Watson concluded his collegiate career in 1939, he took a job as the private secretary to heavyweight boxing champion Joe Louis, and began training for the 1940 Summer Olympics in Helsinki, Finland. Expectations were high that Watson would be one of the United States' biggest stars in the Olympics. In June 1939, sports columnist Charles Dunkley wrote and article predicting success for Watson in Helsinki. Dunkley wrote:

Two ambitions figure to zoom 'Big Bill' Watson, 20-year-old negro lad, called the University of Michigan's one-man track team, to distinguished athletic heights. Foremost is a proud desire to wear the shield of the United States across his chest in the Olympic games in Finland a year hence. The other is to set a new world's record in the shot put. Nothing short of a permanent injury can keep this remarkable negro youngster from accomplishing both, says Charles B. Hoyt, his coach.

During the summer of 1939, Watson toured pre-war Europe with a handpicked U.S. track team. And on August 21, 1939, less than two weeks before the German invasion of Poland, Time magazine predicted that Watson would be America's 1940 Olympic hero, even comparing him to Jesse Owens. Time's August 1939 profile of Watson stated,

"In the 1936 Olympics, the No. 1 hero was Negro Jesse Owens of Cleveland ... Last week it appeared that the 1940 Olympic hero would be another midwestern U. S. Negro, 190-lb. William Delouis Watson, University of Michigan senior."

With his talent in numerous track and field events, many believed Watson could have set a new world decathlon record in the Olympics. However, the 1940 Olympic games were cancelled due to the outbreak of World War II.

With the Olympics canceled, the only decathlon competition held in the United States was the June 1940 Amateur Athletic Union (AAU) championship held in Cleveland, Ohio. The favorites going into the 1940 AAU championship were Watson and two-time defending American decathlon champion Joe Scott, who had overcome infantile paralysis. One writer described the anticipated matchup between Watson and Scott as follows:

This time, however, Scott goes against the finest all-round athlete he has faced in his three years of competition -- Big Bill Watson, the negro who paced Michigan to three straight Big Ten titles. ... This is the first time Watson has participated in the grueling test and a comparison of his and Scott's abilities indicates the rest of the field will merely be a supporting cast for their act.

In the end, Watson outscored Scott by more than 800 points, finishing with 7,523 points in the two-day, 10-event championship. Watson was the first African-American to win the American decathlon championship and also set two new decathlon records, with a discus throw of 151 ft. 3-5/8 in. and a time of 10.8 seconds in the 100-meter dash.

Watson did not compete in the 1941 AAU championship, but attempted a comeback at the 1942 AAU meet in Chicago. Watson won the shot put and finished in second place with a score of 6,076 points—nearly 1,500 points below his 1940 score.

By 1943, Watson had joined the Detroit Police Department, but took time to compete for the Detroit Police Athletic Club in the 1943 AAU championship in Elizabeth, New Jersey. At the meet, the Detroit policeman easily won his second American decathlon championship. Watson compiled a 513-point lead in the first nine events and chose not to compete in the 1,500-meter run, the final event of the decathlon. He finished with 5,994 points in nine events, beating runner-up Joshua Williamson by 186 points.

With World War II continuing, the 1944 Olympic games were again cancelled, and with the cancellation, Watson lost his second and final chance to compete for an Olympic gold medal in the decathlon. Watson continued training in 1944 to defend his AAU decathlon championship, but a sinus attack forced him to withdraw from the competition. At the time, Detroit police officer Watson said, "I sure am sorry to miss the decathlon, because I think I could have won it again."

== Later years and honors ==
By the time the Olympic Games were resumed in 1948, Watson had given up track competition for a full-time career with the Detroit Police Department. He worked as a police officer for 25 years, winning eight meritorious service citations.

Watson retired from the Detroit Police Department in 1966 and died at age 56 in Detroit in 1973. Waston is buried in Forest Lawn Cemetery in Saginaw.

He was posthumously inducted into the University of Michigan Athletic Hall of Honor in 1982 and was inducted into the inaugural class of the Saginaw County Sports Hall of Fame in 2002.

== See also ==
- University of Michigan Athletic Hall of Honor
