= Bob Ufer =

American track and field athlete and radio broadcaster

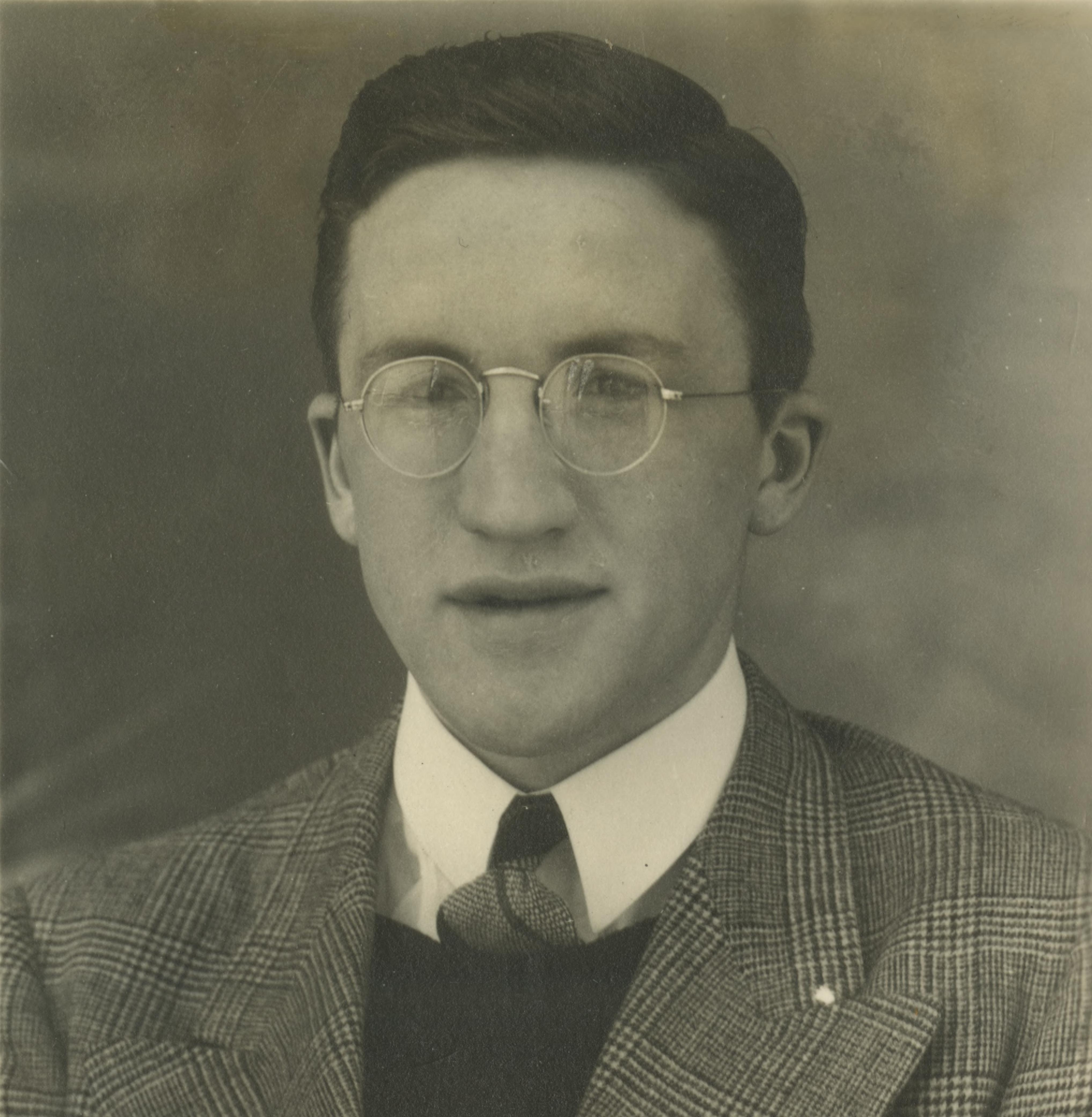
- Ufer c. 1944
- Born: Robert Pormann Ufer; April 1, 1920; Cleveland, Ohio, U.S.
- Died: October 26, 1981 (aged 61); Detroit, Michigan, U.S.
- Education: University of Michigan (A.B.)
- Occupation: Broadcaster
- Years active: 1945–1981

Robert Pormann Ufer (/ˈjuːfʌr/ YEW-furr; April 1, 1920 – October 26, 1981) was an American track and field athlete and radio broadcaster. As an athlete, he set the world indoor record of 48.1 seconds in the indoor 440-yard (quarter-mile) run and was selected as an All-American in 1943. As a broadcaster, he served as the lead broadcaster for the Michigan Wolverines football team for 36 years, starting in 1945. He was in the first group inducted in 1978 into the University of Michigan Athletic Hall of Honor along with Gerald Ford, Bill Freehan, Tom Harmon, Ron Kramer, Bennie Oosterbaan, and Cazzie Russell.

== Early years ==
Ufer was born in Cleveland, Ohio, and grew up in the Pittsburgh suburb of Mt. Lebanon, Pennsylvania. His father Clarence was a lumber broker who had been on the track team during his time at the University of Michigan. Ufer was a track star at Mercersburg Academy, competing under coach Jimmy Curran, and was part of the 440 yard relay team that broke the world scholastic record with a time of 42.2 seconds. This feat earned Ufer and his relay teammates—Jack Watt, Austin Kellam, and Paxson "Pax" Gifford—a place on the Penn Relays Wall of Fame.

At the University of Michigan, Ufer set eight freshman school records in track. At the Big Ten Conference track meet in 1942, he set a new world indoor record of 48.1 seconds in the 440-yard dash, breaking the old record of 48.2. He was a three-time Big Ten Conference champion in the indoor 440-yard dash. Ufer won the 1942 NCAA Track and Field Championships in the 4 × 400 meter relay. He also played halfback on the Michigan freshman reserve football squad in 1939. He graduated with an A.B. in history in 1943.

== Broadcast career ==
Ufer called Wolverines football on Ann Arbor radio station WPAG from 1945 to 1976 and on Detroit's WJR from 1977 to 1981. He is remembered for his exuberant, partisan broadcasting style, openly rooting for Michigan from the booth. Ufer's trademarks included pronouncing "Michigan" as "Meee-chigan," in the style of Fielding Yost, and honking a horn that had been used on General George Patton's jeep after every Michigan score.

== Personal life ==
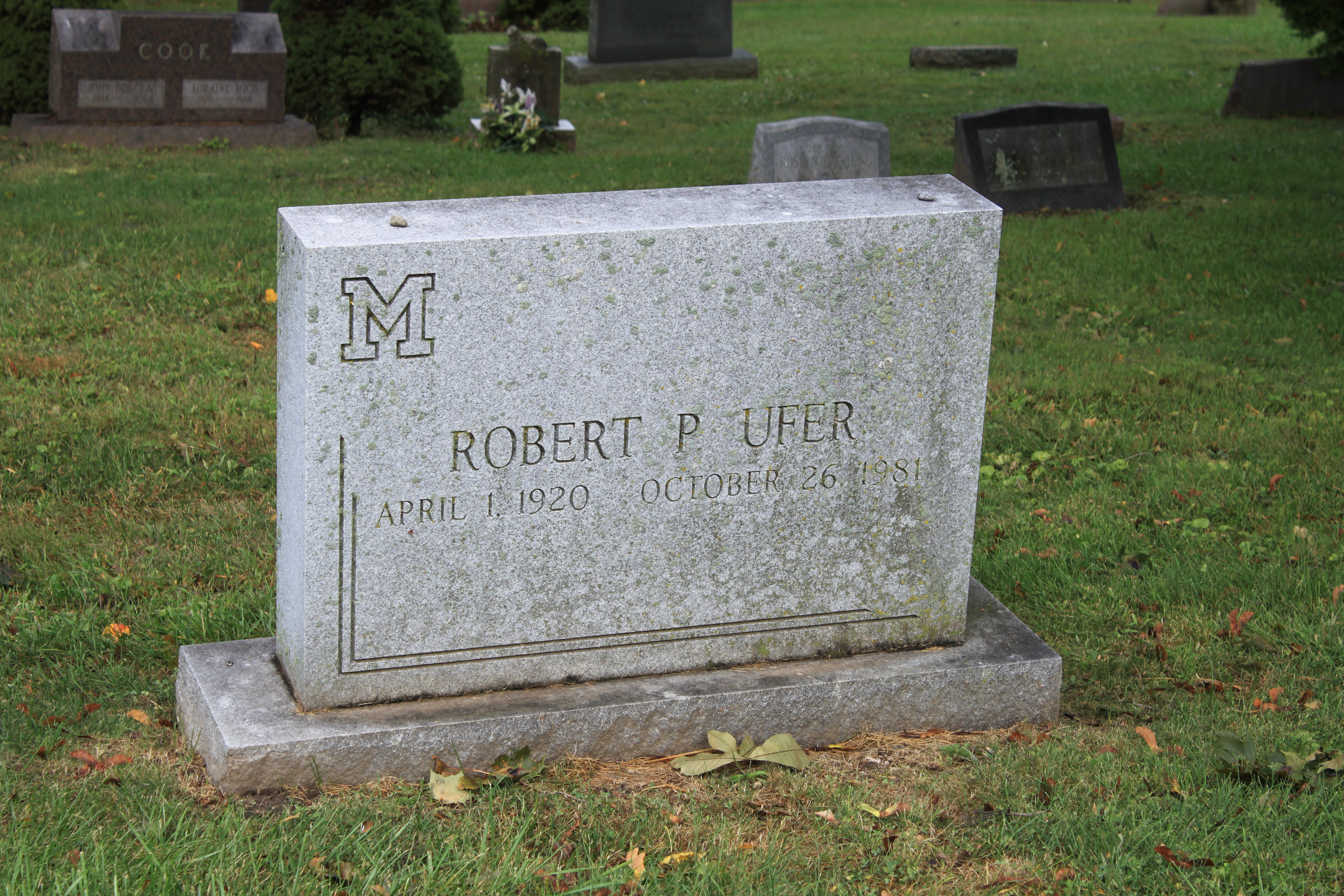
Ufer grave

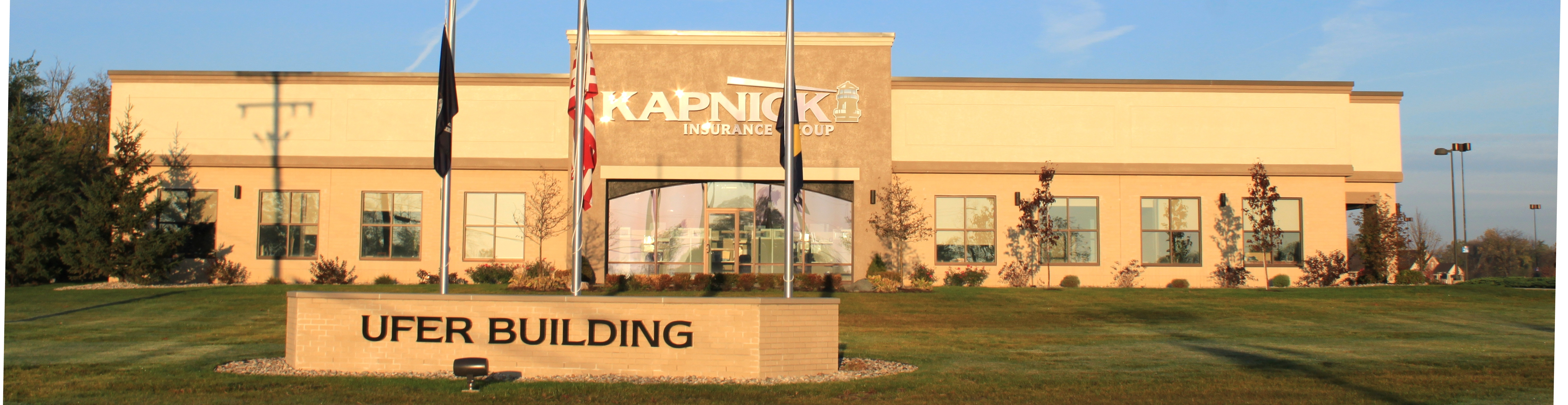
Ufer Building

Outside of broadcasting, Ufer was a life insurance salesman who founded his own company, Ufer & Co. Insurance, in 1947. The offices of Ufer & Co. Insurance, which had been sold by Ufer's sons in 2009 to Kapnick Insurance Group, were moved to a location adjacent to Briarwood Mall to a building renamed "The Ufer Building" in his honor.

On October 26, 1981, nine days after his last broadcast, Ufer died at Henry Ford Hospital in Detroit after a three-year battle with cancer. He was survived by his wife Phyllis and seven children. Former Michigan defensive coordinator Jim Herrmann told The Michigan Daily in 1995, "Bob Ufer was Michigan football. That's what he lived and died for. I think he would have liked being described that way." Ufer was buried at Forest Hill Cemetery in Ann Arbor.

Ufer's son, also named Bob Ufer, was the commissioner of the International Hockey League from 1994 to 1998.
