= Sam Stoller =

American track athlete (1915–1985)

Personal information
- Full name: Samuel Stoller
- Born: August 8, 1915 Cincinnati, Ohio
- Died: May 29, 1985 (aged 69)
- Education: University of Michigan
- Occupations: Actor, Singer

Sam Stoller (August 8, 1915 – May 29, 1985) was an American athlete who specialized in sprinting and long jumping. He tied the world record in the 60-yard dash in 1936. Stoller is best known for his exclusion from the American 4 × 100 relay team at the 1936 Summer Olympics in Berlin. The 2-man substitution triggered widespread speculation that he and Marty Glickman—the only two Jews on the U.S. track team—were excluded because U.S. Olympic Committee chairman Avery Brundage wanted to avoid embarrassing Adolf Hitler by having two Jewish athletes win gold medals. Stoller vowed at the time that he would never run again, but he returned in 1937 to win both the Big Ten Conference and NCAA championships in the 100-yard dash. After graduating from the University of Michigan in 1937, Stoller briefly went into a singing and acting career as "Singin' Sammy Stoller."

== Champion sprinter ==
=== Competition with Jesse Owens ===
A native of Cincinnati, Ohio where he attended Hughes High School, Stoller was one of the best sprinters the state had ever produced, but he had the misfortune of attending high school in Ohio at the same time as Jesse Owens. The two raced on rival teams in high school, and Owens always won, except once. They continued as rivals in college, Owens running for Ohio State and Stoller for Michigan. They competed against each other more than twenty times, and although Owens typically finished first, one writer noted: "As often as not, only a breather separated them." Stoller reportedly once noted that he had seen "perhaps more of Jesse Owens' back than anybody else." He also joked, "I'm the fellow you see in the movies of Jesse's foot races."

Despite his typical role as second-place finisher to Owens, Stoller and Owens became friends. Stoller recalled that, at the 1936 Olympic tryouts, Owens pushed him along. In the 100-meters final, Stoller was trailing badly, when Owens turned around and yelled, "Come on, Sammy, step on it!" Stoller recalled, "I never knew a greater fellow than Jesse. After the race he shook my hand and said, 'I was hoping you would make it and I couldn't help pulling. I hope I didn't bother you.'"

=== Accomplishments prior to 1936 Olympics ===
Stoller worked his way through the University of Michigan by washing dishes and sweeping floors at a fraternity house. During the 1936 track season, Stoller proved himself to be one of America's top sprinters and long jumpers. At the Big Ten championship in March 1936, Stoller tied the world indoor record in the 60-yard dash with a time of 6.1 seconds. Stoller was also one of the USA's top long-jumpers in 1936 with a 23-foot, 10-inch jump. Though he failed to make the Olympic team as a long jumper, he qualified for the Olympic team as a member of the 4 × 100 meter relay team along with Jesse Owens, Frank Wykoff, Marty Glickman, and Foy Draper.

=== 1936 Summer Olympics in Berlin ===
==== Exclusion of Stoller and Glickman ====
Newspaper announcement in July 1936 that Stoller (far left) and Glickman have qualified for the 4 x 100 relay team

On the morning that the 4 x 100 relay competition began, U.S. track coach Lawson Robertson called a meeting and informed Stoller and Glickman that they had been pulled from the event and that they would be replaced by Owens and Ralph Metcalfe. Glickman later recalled that all the sprinters were called into a special meeting by Robertson and his assistant, Dean Cromwell. "We were informed by the coaches that the Germans were hiding their best sprinters to make an all-out effort to win the 400-meter relay, and consequently, Jesse Owens and Ralph Metcalfe were to replace Stoller and me." Stoller was completely stunned and did not say a word at the meeting. Glickman responded by immediately questioning the premise, challenging Robertson by asserting "Coach, you can't hide world-class sprinters." Jesse Owens spoke in favor of letting Stoller and Glickman run, saying, "Coach, I've won my 3 gold medals. I'm tired. I've had it. Let Marty and Sam run, they deserve it." When Owens spoke, assistant coach Cromwell told him, "You'll do as you're told."

The American team, without Stoller and Glickman, won the race by 12 yards in a new world-record time. Stoller declined to watch the finals and declared after the Olympics that he would "never run again."

==== Controversy surrounding the decision ====
Glickman immediately went public with a charge that the decision to pull him and Stoller was the product of "politics." After the heats failed to reveal Germany's hidden sprinters, Glickman told the press in Berlin, "The heats failed to show the necessity for shaking up the line-up after Stoller and myself long practiced the stick-work. We did not know until this morning's conference with Head Coach Robertson just who would run. It looks like politics to us." Glickman charged that "this talk about the Germans and the Dutch being so tough looks like a false alarm on the basis of today's trials." Stoller, who turned 21 on the day of the event, did not appear at the stadium, leading Glickman to say: "A fine present for Sam, wasn't it?"

Robertson took responsibility for the decision and sharply denied that any prejudice was involved. He insisted his sole purpose was to run the best available quartet and noted that the team's world-record performance was the best answer to his critics. However, Robertson's decision and Glickman's public comments led to a decades-long controversy over whether Stoller and Glickman were pulled to avoid embarrassing the German hosts of the Olympics. One wire service story from Berlin noted: "Leaving of Two Jewish Boys Out of 400 Race Brings Repercussions." Columnist Braven Dyer noted that Robertson's decision had been "panned" and had "angered a lot of folks" when he "jerked" Stoller and Glickman from the team. Dyer asserted that "Glickman and Stoller had good reason to believe that when they qualified to represent the United States in the baton-passing event that nothing less than physical deterioration would prevent them from running. Apparently the boys were in good shape. Their conduct had offended no member of the brass hat brigade." And when the U.S. team arrived in New York, press accounts indicated that "an internal battle" loomed in the Olympic organization over "the dropping of two Jewish sprinters, Sam Stoller and Marty Glickman."

==== Historical perspective on the exclusion ====
In his official report after the 1936 Olympics, Avery Brundage rejected the suggestion that Stoller and Glickman had been excluded due to their religion. He wrote, "An erroneous report was circulated that two athletes had been dropped from the American relay team because of their religion. This report was absurd." And U.S. Coach Robertson asserted that his decision was motivated solely by putting together the strongest possible relay team. Yet, the debate and controversy continued for more than 60 years. In 2001, the Los Angeles Times noted that theories abound, though "historians and authors have never been able to provide a definitive answer." Critics of the exclusion pointed to the following as alleged evidence of appeasement or anti-Semitism:

- Critics noted that the stated premise of the exclusion, the presence of powerful German sprinters in hiding, was "preposterous." An investigation in 1998 by the Los Angeles Times rebutted the coaches' claim that more speed was needed and concluded that "history points to something darker." The Times found no evidence to support the claim that the Germans were "sandbagging some super sprinters for the race" and noted that "reports have persisted almost from the moment of the change that religion was behind it."
- Stoller and Glickman were the only two Jews on the 66-person U.S. track team and the only two healthy team members who were not permitted to compete in Berlin. 400 m runner Hal Smallwood also did not compete, but he had undergone an appendectomy.
- Four or five days before the race, the U.S. coaches held a race to determine the running order. In that race, according to the 1972 book, All That Glitters Is Not Gold, Stoller finished first, Glickman second and Draper third. Yet, Stoller and Glickman were excluded instead of Draper.
- In addition to speed, coordination and practice in passing the baton was key in a 400-meter relay. The original foursome, including Stoller and Glickman, had spent considerable time practicing their baton passes.
- Though he was not able to produce proof, Glickman said years later that he had learned that Nazi propaganda minister Joseph Goebbels had told Brundage that Hitler "would be very displeased if Jews were to race in 'his' Olympic games," and that Brundage then passed the message as an order to the U.S. track coaches.
- In 1996, the U.S. Holocaust Museum sponsored a special exhibit on the 1936 Nazi Olympics focusing on the exclusion of Stoller and Glickman. At the time, Glickman asserted that Avery Brundage was "an American Nazi" who wanted to spare Hitler and his entourage the embarrassment of seeing Jews receiving medals on the podium. Glickman also noted that Brundage was an organizer, founder and officer of the America First Committee and that assistant track coach Dean Cromwell was also a member of the America First Committee in California.
- In April 2000, The Jerusalem Report conducted an investigation of the incident and concluded: "Only years later did the reason for the switch become clear: The American team had buckled under to Nazi pressure to keep Jews out of the games."
- After the Nazis banned Jews from competing in German sports in 1934, American Olympic Committee chairman Avery Brundage "made a brief, Nazi-controlled inspection of Germany and declared that the country's Jews were being allowed to participate."
- In an American Olympic Committee pamphlet, Brundage argued that American athletes should not involve themselves in "the present Jew-Nazi altercation."
- Robertson's claim that he was motivated by a wish to put together the strongest possible team appears questionable in the light of his neglect of the 4 × 400 m relay team. He omitted Archie Williams who won the 400 m, James LuValle who came third, and Glenn Hardin who won the 400 m hurdles, and stuck with the original quartet, who went on to be beaten by Great Britain.

=== Big Ten and NCAA championships in 1937 ===
"Speedy Sammy Stoller cracks tape" at dual meet against Cal, April 1937

After vowing in 1936 never to run again, Stoller recanted and chose to compete in the 1937 track season. Newspapers predicted that, with Jesse Owens turning professional, Stoller would find his place in the limelight. An Associated Press story in February 1937 noted:

"Fleet Sammy Stoller has discarded that second fiddle. The University of Michigan ace sprinter, until now generally finding the track summaries in sprints reading: 'Second, Stoller,' has darted ahead, at this date, of the country's leading sprinters."

The press observed that, in a career "heretofore frustrated alone by Owens," 1937 was Stoller's "bid for national recognition."

In February 1937, Stoller beat a fast field in the 50-yard dash at the Boston meet, finishing ahead of Ben Johnson of Columbia, Glickman and Canadian star Sam Richardson. And in April 1937, Stoller ran a 9.5 second 100-yard dash at Los Angeles. He dominated the 100-yard dash through the 1937 track season, winning both the Big Ten and NCAA championships. His best official time in 1937 was 9.6, though he was unofficially timed at 9.4. At the end of the 1937 season, Stoller was picked as an All-American.

== Acting career ==
After winning the 100-yard championship, Stoller announced that he intended to pursue a career as "a crooner Movie Star" and became known as "Singin' Sammy Stoller." Screen comedian Joe E. Brown was instrumental in getting Stoller bit parts in several 1937 motion pictures, and registration with the Screen Actors Guild. His first part was in a crowd scene at a New York cafe in Mae West's Every Day's a Holiday. He appeared as a singer and actor in several Hollywood motion pictures. Hollywood reporter Bill Henry wrote in November 1937:

"Sam, who is something of a singer, decided to stay out here after the National Intercollegiates which finished his rah-rah sprint career last June. Joe E. Brown introduced him to a couple of people and Sam talked and sung over half the radios in California and has appeared in nine — count 'em — pictures. They are 'Navy Blue and Gold,' 'Rosalie,' 'Tom Sawyer,' 'Nothing Sacred,' 'She's Got That Swing,' 'The Thrill of a Lifetime,' 'Taking the Town,' 'Blossoms Broadway,' and 'Every Day's a Holiday.' In five months Sam has dashed from one studio to another to appear in these super-colossals — and not a blamed one of 'em has been released yet."

In January 1938, Louella Parsons wrote about Stoller in her Hollywood column. She noted that, although the Michigan track star had thus far rated only "bit" parts, the stars were being photographed with him. "So far Sammy's been photographed with Fredric March, Carole Lombard, Errol Flynn, Bette Davis and many others and now all his pals back east who see the pictures think he's a big shot, making thousands in the movies and chumming with the stars. One of his pals went so far as to borrow $1,000 from him — and the most Sammy has earned is $10 per day — some days!"

In 1938, Stoller participated in a two-month exhibition tour of the Philippine Islands as part of a four-man team competing under the name, The Southern California Sportsmen's Association.

In 1940, columnist Pat Robinson commented on Stoller's extraordinary year:

"Sammy Stoller ... Michigan '37 ... who was clocked in 9.4 for the century .. is going to make a comeback on the boards this winter ... The chunky speedster has had a short but hectic career since leaving Michigan ... He's been in the movies .. sung on the radio ... and in night clubs ... travelled 70,000 miles for athletic competition .. and got himself married ... none of which ... he says ... has slowed him down."

== Posthumous honors and medal from Olympic Committee ==
Stoller died on May 29, 1985, at age 69. In 1998, U.S. Olympic Committee Chairman William Hybl sought to remedy the past wrong and awarded the USOC's first Gen. Douglas MacArthur medals to Stoller (posthumously) and Glickman. Hybl said at the time, "We regret this injustice and we feel it was an injustice. We're not only atoning for this but recognizing two great individuals."

In 2007, Stoller was posthumously awarded the "Pillar of Achievement" award by the International Jewish Sports Hall of Fame.
