= Stephen Farrell (track and field) =

Stephen J. Farrell
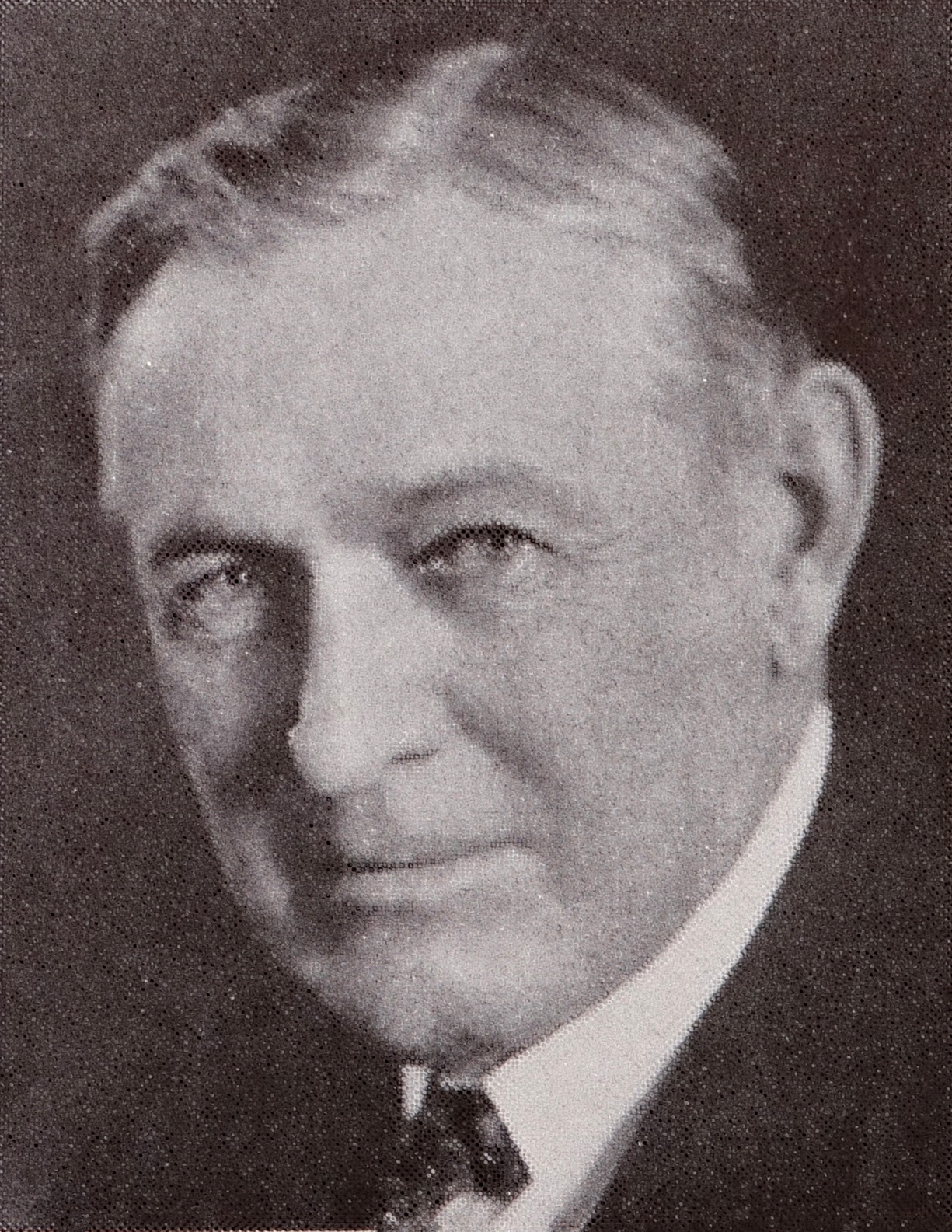
- Farrell from 1925 Michiganensian
- Born: December 26, 1863; Rockville, Connecticut, U.S.
- Died: October 17, 1933 (aged 69); Ann Arbor, Michigan, U.S.
- Years active: 1888–1930
- Known for: Track athlete and coach

Stephen J. Farrell (December 26, 1863 – October 17, 1933) was an American professional track athlete, circus performer and track coach.

Farrell was a professional foot-racer in the 1880s and 1890s, beginning as a competitor in the hook, hose and ladder teams of New England. He was the first American to win England's Sheffield Cup on two occasions and competed in races from 100 yards to one mile. He became known as "the greatest professional footracer this country has ever known."

Seeking out new challenges, Farrell performed with the Barnum & Bailey Circus for several years racing against a horse, and he was never known to ever lose to the horse.(Farrell proudly noted that, in several years of racing horses with the circus, "he was beaten only half a dozen times by the horse during the years" .) Farrell later became a track coach at Yale University, the University of Maine, Ohio State University, and the University of Michigan. He coached at Michigan for 18 years and developed many great athletes, including DeHart Hubbard and Eddie Tolan.

== Biography ==
He was born on December 26, 1863, in Rockville, Connecticut, to Matthew Farrell.

== Professional foot-racer ==
=== The greatest professional foot-racer in America ===
Farrell grew up at a time when professional foot-racing was one of the most popular sports in New England, attracting as much attention as football would in the 20th Century. Farrell gained fame as one of the world's foremost professional runners in the 1880s and 1890s. Sports writer Walter Eckersall called Farrell "the greatest professional footracer this country has ever known." It was said that Farrell "could run any race from the hundred to the mile." In his day, he was considered by his opponents "the best money racer who ever pulled on a running shoe." Harry Gill, who later became the track coach at the University of Illinois, competed against Farrell and said he had never seen Farrell's equal.

=== Hook, hose and ladder events ===
Farrell got his start competing in the hook, hose and ladder events that were popular in New England. Farrell was much in demand as a No. 1 man on fire department teams and represented "many a team." Each town's fire team was made up of 16 men, and Farrell was the captain of three hose teams in Massachusetts. In those competitions, a hose cart was placed 300 yards from a dummy hydrant, and the team pushed the cart to the hydrant where the hose was uncoupled and fastened to the hydrant as the cart then raced another 200 yards and the nozzle affixed to the hose. In the hook and ladder days, Farrell raced with some of the greats of the sport who later became major college track coaches, including Keene Fitzpatrick, Mike Murphy, Johnny Mack and Bill Donovan.

=== Caledonian games and Sheffield Handicap ===
Farrell became a regular in the "Caledonian games," a professional track circuit in Boston, New York, Philadelphia, Buffalo and Chicago. Farrell initially had success in middle distance events from 300 yards to a mile. He later shifted to the short sprint events and also became expert in the long jump and the triple jump. At one time, he also held the record in the standing backward jump at 11 feet.

In 1891, the citizens of Leicester, Massachusetts, provided Farrell with the financial backing to send him to England for the $15,000 Sheffield Handicap, then the world's foremost sprint event which was run over a turf course and attracted "the fastest sprinters in the world." He won the Sheffield Handicap in 1891 and returned to win for a second time in March 1894, becoming the first American to win the event twice. After winning his second Sheffield Handicap, a Massachusetts newspaper reported: "Steve Farrell is perhaps the best known runner in the world, having swept the card of sprinters in both hemispheres."

In August 1891, 20,000 spectators watched Farrell compete in the Clan-Na-Gael athletic games in Philadelphia. The Philadelphia Inquirer reported that Farrell won the half-mile race (which was "virtually a walk-over for Steve Farrell, who was never pushed for the race and won with consummate ease"), the 120-yards hurdle (with Farrell winning "in hollow style" after nearly falling over the first hurdle), and the standing hop, step and jump (with Farrell "winning comfortably with 33 feet, 10-1/2 inches"). Farrell finished second in the 220-yard race (though he had been "looked upon as a sure winner") and third in the three standing jumps.

=== Gambling and the handicap system ===
Farrell ran at a time when the races were handicap affairs in which "the winner would win by as narrow a margin as possible in order not to be severely handicapped in future races." Because of the nature of the handicap system, there was uncertainty as to how fast Farrell could run. Walter Eckersall noted that it was likely that Farrell could run a 48-second quarter-mile based on a reported incident in which Farrell's backers wagered that he could make the time, but the backers of the opposing runner declined the bet.

Gambling was a major element of professional foot-racing, and Farrell reportedly "earned a substantial living by betting on himself against the best men in Europe and America." It is said that Farrell "earned more money from professional foot racing than any other man who made a livelihood from this sort of endeavor." Matched against an English runner in London, Farrell met an Englishman on the boat trip to London and wagered his return passage money that he would win. Farrell won the race and doubled his return passage money. In November 1891, a riot nearly broke out when Farrell won a 300-yard race in Pittsburg with time of 34 seconds. One of the losing runner's backers was "with difficulty restrained" from shooting Farrell. A newspaper reported: "The race was regarded as a farce and for a time there was almost a riot. Betting was two to one in favor of Farrell."

=== Racing career ended by collision with a dog ===
His professional running career came to an end in 1898 when he broke his ankle after tripping over a Newfoundland dog. Varying accounts exist as to Farrell's injury. In one version, Farrell was training with the dog. In another version, the dog was a stray that wandered on the track. According to a third version, a race had been arranged between Farrell and the dog, and Farrell and "the hound ran neck and neck, until the dog cut under the man, and Farrell tripped and fell."

== Circus performer ==
After gaining fame as the winner of the Sheffield Handicap, Farrell returned to the United States and signed up to race a horse at the Barnum & Bailey Circus in New York's Hippodrome. The "Horse vs. Man" race had become a regular feature of the Barnum & Bailey show, with the man being given a handicap in a footrace against a horse. Farrell announced that he would race against the horse with no handicap, and the widely publicized event drew 10,000 paying customers. Farrell defeated the horse and was put on the circus payroll. Farrell repeated the act on a regular basis, racing the horse twice around the sawdust arena. Farrell proudly noted that, in several years of racing horses with the circus, "he was beaten only half a dozen times by the horse."

Farrell often told another story about his circus work. He was once part of a parade with the entire circus troupe through the worst part of the Bowery in New York when they were met with "a shower of over-ripe eggs, tomatoes, bricks and deceased cats." Farrell was thrown from his horse and "for once made excellent use of his excellent pair of legs" in running from the scene. Despite his speed, Farrell noted he was covered with eggs and full-grown tomatoes before he reached the first corner.

== Track coach ==
=== Yale, Maine and Ohio State ===
After his running career ended in 1898, Farrell spent four years as a private track instructor specializing in conditioning runners. In the fall of 1902, Farrell was hired by Mike Murphy to become the track coach at Yale University. After leading Yale to a successful track season, Farrell was hired as the track coach at the University of Maine where he remained for seven years. By 1908, Farrell had become one of the most popular figures at the University of Maine as shown in the following excerpt from the Daily Kennebeck Journal:

"'Steve' Farrell is without a doubt one of the most popular men at the University of Maine and the student body holds him in the highest esteem not only on account of his reputation throughout the country as a track coach but also because he is a friend to every student at the university."

In December 1909, Farrell was hired by Ohio State University as coach of the track team and trainer of the football team. In December 1911, Farrell became involved in a struggle for power between the faculty and Student Athletic Board at Ohio State. Farrell bid farewell to the football team after a Thanksgiving game, noting that he did not believe he would be retained. According to a contemporary press account, "the entire squad thereupon, in tears, pledged themselves not to again compete in athletics.". They went on to chronicle his record and describe their admiration for him in the student newspaper, saying, "No one man has ever done more for Ohio State athletics than "Steve" Farrell Since his coming to Ohio State two years ago, a cleaner, more sportsman-like spirit has been instilled into every athlete coming under the trainers' influence."

=== University of Michigan ===
In September 1912, Farrell was hired as the athletic trainer at the University of Michigan and noted at the time that the Ann Arbor institution "is the only western college that is thought much of down east." He served as the school's track coach until his retirement in 1930, and he was also the trainer to Fielding H. Yost's football teams from 1912 to 1919.

In 1915, a series of newspaper articles touted Farrell as an innovator in track coaching, noting his innovations in the following areas:

- In February 1915, The New York Times reported on Farrell's novel plan to instill "enthusiasm and vim" in his athletes by having them train to the accompaniment of music played by the Varsity band. Farrell noted that his athletes had been taking more interest in dancing competitions than athletic training. Farrell planned to have the musicians "render tunes a trifle faster than the natural stride" of Michigan's best performer in each event. "It is expected that the inspiration of the music and the natural efforts of the dancers to get in time should make the Michigan men exert themselves more willingly than they are at present doing."
- In January 1915, Farrell introduced rope skipping as a training method for his long distance runners. Farrell noted, "It is a great form of exercise to develop the body, especially making men long winded and strong in the legs. It also has a tendency in making them quick and alert on their toes."
- Farrell instituted "the espionage system of discovering budding athletes" by stationing "a force of spies" in the college gymnasium watching for men of sufficient prowess to compete on the track team. The "new detective method of locating possible athletes" was begun after a freshman student was seen completing a high jump of six feet — six inches higher than any member of the track team.

When Michigan rejoined the Big Ten Conference in 1918, Farrell's Michigan track teams promptly won the indoor and outdoor track championships in both 1918 and 1919. Between 1918 and 1930, Farrell's teams won ten Big Ten Conference championships. His teams had a 50–16–1 record in dual meets, and his athletes won 76 Big Ten individual event titles and 11 NCAA individual event titles. Michigan also won its only NCAA team track championship in 1923 under Farrell. While coaching at Michigan, Farrell's star athletes included:

- Carl Johnson — the first athlete to win four events at a Big Ten Conference meet; silver medalist in the long jump at the 1920 Summer Olympics held in Antwerp, Belgium.
- DeHart Hubbard — the first African American to win an Olympic gold medal in an individual event (the long jump at the 1924 Summer Olympics in Paris); Hubbard also set world records in the long jump (25 feet 10 3/4 inches (7.89 m)) and the 100-yard dash (9.6 seconds); and
- Eddie Tolan, gold medalist in the 100 and 200-meter races at the 1932 Summer Olympics.

Walter Eckersall later wrote that, beyond coaching stars, Farrell was "a stickler for balance and depended more upon the ability of athletes to win third, fourth and fifth places than those who were picked to win." He won many meets by focusing on team power and placing athletes where they could score points.

Farrell remained fit even in his later years. In 1925, the 62-year-old coach reportedly beat some of his athletes with a standing backward jump of better than eight feet.

When Farrell announced his retirement, the noted sports columnist Grantland Rice paid tribute to Farrell's talent in training sprinters.

"As long as Farrell is active he will continue to turn out championship sprinters. The 'Steve start' is about the fastest thing uncovered. Michigan sprinters are in the lead at ten yards. They're out in front here, even when they're occasionally whipped. There is no finer influence on college athletes in America than that which Steve exerts at Michigan ..."

== War service ==
When the United States entered World War I, Farrell volunteered at age 53 and passed the Air Service examination. He served for six months at Ellington Field in Houston, Texas, and Kelly Field in San Antonio. He was reported to be "the oldest commissioned flying officer in the air corps."

== Death ==
Farrell died of a heart attack at age 69 in October 1933 while on the first tee of the University of Michigan Golf Course in Ann Arbor.

Preceded by Alvin Kraenzlein	Michigan Wolverines football trainer 1912–1915	Succeeded by Harry Tuthill
