= 2002 Italian Grand Prix =

Formula One motor race

Coordinates: 45°36′56″N 9°16′52″E

Race 15 of 17 in the 2002 Formula One World Championship
← Previous race	Next race →
- Autodromo Nazionale di Monza (last modified in 2000)

Race details
- Date: 15 September 2002
- Official name: Gran Premio Vodafone d'Italia 2002
- Location: Autodromo Nazionale di Monza, Monza, Lombardy, Italy
- Course: Permanent racing facility
- Course length: 5.793 km (3.600 miles)
- Distance: 53 laps, 306.719 km (190.586 miles)
- Weather: Sunny, hot, dry 23°C
- Attendance: 90,000

Pole position
Driver	(Colombia) Juan Pablo Montoya	Williams-BMW
- Time: 1:20.264

Fastest lap
Driver	(Brazil) Rubens Barrichello	Ferrari
- Time: 1:23.297 on lap 36

Podium
First	(Brazil) Rubens Barrichello	Ferrari
Second	(Germany) Michael Schumacher	Ferrari
Third	(United Kingdom) Eddie Irvine	Jaguar-Cosworth

The 2002 Italian Grand Prix (formally the Gran Premio Vodafone d'Italia 2002) was a Formula One motor race that took place at the Autodromo Nazionale di Monza near Monza, Lombardy, Italy before 60,000 spectators on 15 September 2002. It was the 15th round of the 2002 Formula One World Championship, the second Italian round of the year and the season's last race in Europe. Starting from fourth place, Ferrari's Rubens Barrichello won the 53-lap race His teammate Michael Schumacher finished in second with Jaguar's Eddie Irvine third.

Williams' Juan Pablo Montoya qualified on pole position after recording the quickest average qualifying lap speed in the one-hour session. Michael Schumacher started second, with Montoya's teammate Ralf Schumacher third and Barrichello fourth. At the start, Ralf Schumacher took the lead by cutting the Rettifilo chicane and was told by the stewards to give it back to Montoya, but he lost pressure in the engine's pneumatic valve system as he did so. Montoya briefly led, but the smoke from Ralf Schumacher's car and loss of momentum allowed Barrichello to take the lead at the start of lap five. Barrichello led for the bulk of the remaining laps, except for the first pit stop cycle, and won his third race of the season and fourth of his career. His teammate Michael Schumacher finished second, 0.255 seconds behind, while Irvine finished third, giving him and Jaguar their first podium since the 2001 Monaco Grand Prix.

The result saw Michael Schumacher eclipse his own record for most championship points scored in a single season, which he set in 2001. Barrichello's victory moved him 17 championship points ahead of the third-placed Montoya in the World Drivers' Championship. In the World Constructors' Championship, Ferrari expanded their unassailable lead over Williams to 103 championship points, while McLaren secured third with two races remaining in the season.

== Background ==
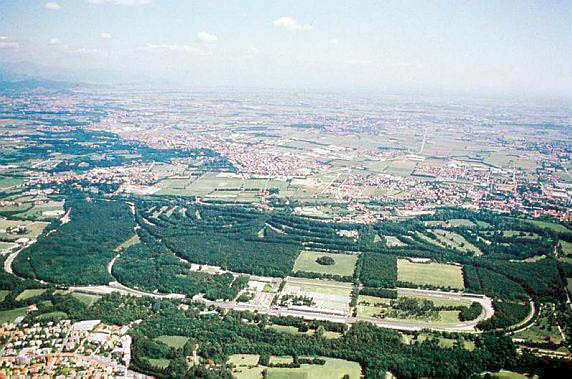
The Autodromo Nazionale di Monza, where the Grand Prix was held.

The 2002 Italian Grand Prix, contested at the 5.793 km (3.600 mi), 11-turn Autodromo Nazionale di Monza at Monza, Lombardy, Italy on 15 September, was the 15th round of 17 in the 2002 Formula One World Championship. It was the 73rd Italian Grand Prix, the second of two events in Italy following the San Marino Grand Prix, and the season's final European race. Tyre suppliers Bridgestone and Michelin developed tyre specifications specifically for the Monza track, with a focus on heat resistance because tyres on the straights heated up faster than on other circuits. Heading into the race, both the World Drivers' Championship and World Constructors' Championship were already won, with Ferrari's Michael Schumacher winning the World Drivers' Championship four rounds earlier at the French Grand Prix and Ferrari won the World Constructors' Championship two races later at the Hungarian Grand Prix, with Williams too many championship points behind to catch up. Michael Schumacher could break his own season points scoring record if he finished fifth or higher at Monza.

After the Belgian Grand Prix on 1 September, ten teams (except Arrows) tested for four days with their racing and test drivers at Monza from 3 to 6 September, testing vehicle components and gathering data for the upcoming race at the circuit. Michael Schumacher was fastest on the first day, ahead of British American Racing (BAR) test driver Anthony Davidson, in wet weather with sporadic dry spells. Williams' Ralf Schumacher lapped faster on the second day where the rain continued into the morning before stopping meaning the track dried up as the session progressed. The first full day of dry weather took place on the third day, with Jaguar's Pedro de la Rosa fastest. Rubens Barrichello was fastest on testing's final day. Williams' Juan Pablo Montoya caused a red flag when he lost control of his car at the Lesmo corners and collided with a barrier, removing the front wing. Ferrari test driver Luca Badoer spent three days testing Bridgestone tyres and racing setups at France's Circuit Paul Ricard. Badoer then shook down three F2002 cars and performed launch control starts at the Fiorano Circuit before the cars were transported to Monza.

Barrichello said he was looking forward to the event considering the previous year's race took place in the aftermath of the September 11 attacks in the United States, adding, "It is a special place for me and I usually go well here so there is plenty to look forward to." Michael Schumacher said he would be able to celebrate both championships at Monza after being unable to do so the previous year due to the attacks in America. However, he stated that the running order would be closer than it was in Belgium, and that expecting Ferrari to finish 1-2 would be "presumptuous". Montoya believed Williams could realistically finish third at Monza with the equipment they possessed. However, following testing, he revised his prediction to a race victory, "I think the best chance we've got this year to win a race is this next one."

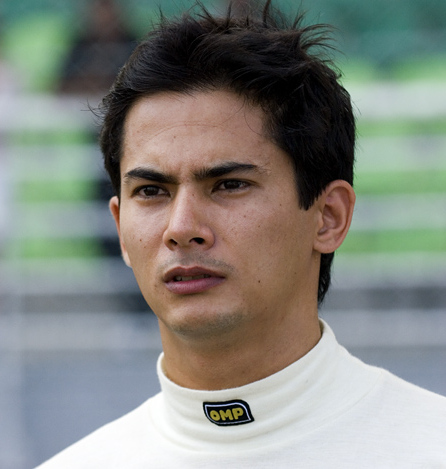
Alex Yoong (pictured in 2006) returned to his race seat at Minardi after sitting out the previous two races.

Speed bumps were added at the first and second chicanes for the event after it was discovered that a driver could gain time by going across the tight opening chicane or by using the flat run-off area adjacent to the apex of both chicanes and driving on without penalty unless they gained a place. Gaps were created between the speed bumps to allow drivers who had outbraked themselves to navigate between them. The bumps drew mixed feedback from drivers. Barrichello thought they were quite valuable because it had been difficult for drivers a year ago to tell if cars passing through had gained or lost time. Renault's Jarno Trulli stated the bumps were excessively high and added some drivers would request their removal to the race organisers because their vehicles could be damaged. Montoya claimed running over one of them would put a driver into the wall while McLaren's David Coulthard said they appeared to be overly close together.

Ten constructors represented by a racing team entered two drivers each for the event. Alex Yoong retook his race seat at Minardi after Davidson replaced him in the previous two races due to Yoong not qualifying for three races earlier in the season. Arrows' financial troubles persisted as chairman Tom Walkinshaw attempted to negotiate the team's sale, which also owed money to four creditors. The team failed to present their cars by Thursday afternoon's preliminary scrutineering, missing the event. Sauber were the first team to test the HANS device at a Formula One race with drivers Nick Heidfeld and Felipe Massa. Teams focused on finding a setup with a very low aerodynamic load that would provide the least amount of downforce feasible without penalising the cars too much during the heavy braking that characterises the Monza track. Each team adopted rear wings with lower profiles, while others, such as Renault, presented new front wings. Ferrari introduced a new qualifying engine, but for the race on Sunday, the team used the original engine specification. Williams and BAR introduced revised engine specifications for qualifying.

== Practice ==
Preceding the race were two one-hour practice sessions on Friday and two 45-minute sessions on Saturday. The first practice session on Friday morning was overcast, with the circuit damp in sections due to overnight rain, so some drivers chose intermediate tyres. The track eventually dried out, and lap times became faster. Michael Schumacher set the quickest time of 1:22.869, almost eight-tenths of a second faster than Montoya. Ralf Schumacher, De la Rosa, Trulli, Jaguar's Eddie Irvine, Massa, the McLaren duo of Coulthard and Kimi Räikkönen and BAR's Olivier Panis followed in the top ten. There were no major incidents during the session, although some drivers ran off the circuit, including Irvine who twice ran into the gravel traps. Barrichello had a soft brake pedal, so mechanics in the pit lane had to bleed the system before he could continue.

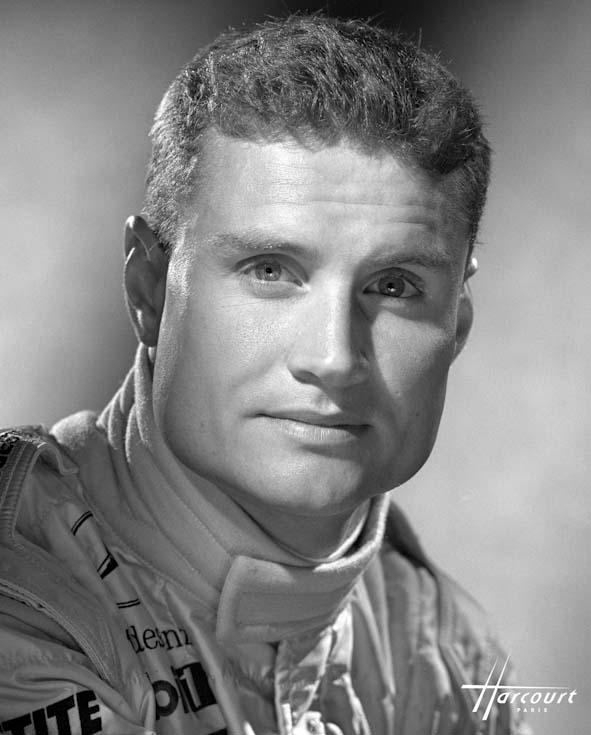
David Coulthard (pictured in 1999) crashed his McLaren car during the second free practice session on the Friday afternoon.

The second practice session took place later in the afternoon under cloudy conditions. Michael Schumacher lapped four-tenths of a second faster than in the first session, finishing first with a 1:22.433 lap, 0.225 seconds faster than his teammate Barrichello. Räikkönen, Irvine, Montoya, Toyota's Mika Salo, Ralf Schumacher, De la Rosa, Trulli and his teammate Jenson Button rounded out the top ten. Some drivers ran off the circuit during the session. After putting a wheel on the grass at the Curva del Serraglio turn, Coulthard spun into the tyre barrier five minutes into the session. Yoong spun his car at the Ascari chicane exit midway through the session, colliding rear-first into the tire wall. He abandoned his car there. Allan McNish's Toyota stopped at the end of the pit lane when it got stuck in first gear and pushed the car back into the garage. This required a rear end switch to his car.

In the third practice session, held in sunny weather on Saturday morning, Michael Schumacher was again quickest with a 1:22.110 lap, 0.025 seconds faster than Montoya. The McLaren duo of Coulthard and Räikkönen, Ralf Schumacher, the Jaguar pairing of Irvine and De la Rosa, Massa, McNish and BAR's Jacques Villeneuve completed the top ten. The session was halted midway through after Barrichello's car began to emit smoke due to an engine failure at the Curva Grande exit. Marshals moved the Ferrari off the circuit and into a safer area and cleaned oil laid on the asphalt track before practice could resume. Ferrari installed a new engine in his car.

The final practice session took place later in the morning. Late in the session, Montoya set the quickest time of 1:21.319, which was 0.009 seconds inside Michael Schumacher's 2001 pole lap. Positions three through ten were occupied by Barrichello, Ralf Schumacher, the McLaren pairing of Räikkönen and Coulthard. the Jaguar duo of De la Rosa and Irvine, McNish and Villeneuve. More drivers spun their cars during the session. Button ended his session early when he spun his Renault at high-speed in the gravel trap at the Parabolica corner.

== Qualifying ==
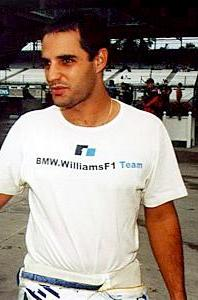
Juan Pablo Montoya set a new fastest recorded average qualifying lap speed to secure his seventh pole position of the season.

Each driver was allowed twelve laps during Saturday's one-hour qualifying session, with starting positions determined by the drivers' quickest laps. During this session, the 107% rule was in effect, requiring each driver to remain within 107% of the quickest lap time in order to qualify for the race. Qualifying took place in clear and sunny weather. The Williams and Ferrari teams chose to experiment with tyre set-ups, employing hard compound tyres to try to improve race performance. On his third run. Montoya took his seventh pole position of the season and 10th of his career with a time of 1:20.264. He achieved the fastest recorded average qualifying lap speed of 259.827 km/h (161.449 mph), surpassing Keke Rosberg's run in qualifying for the 1985 British Grand Prix. Montoya gained significant time through the Lesmo turns, resulting in a quick second sector time. Michael Schumacher was second, 0.257 seconds behind after overdriving through the two Lesmo turns; he set a quick lap followed by one to cool the tyres and then another fast timed lap despite it taking multiple laps to generate heat into his tyres. Ralf Schumacher was the early pacesetter, but fell to third at the end of qualifying after making an error at the Lesmo turn, causing him to mount the kerbing on his third run, preventing him from improving his time. Barrichello set his best time on his second run to qualify fourth, braking too late for the first chicane. With five minutes to go, and during his warming up for his final quick lap, Räikkönen put Jordan's Takuma Sato off the circuit and onto the grass while braking for the Variante della Roggia chicane after failing to notice him, forcing Sato to lose control of his car. Sato's front left-wheel struck the rear of Räikkonen's car, sending both drivers into the gravel trap and Sato hit the tyre barrier. Both drivers were unhurt, but qualifying was stopped for seven minutes. Räikkönen was provisionally fifth.

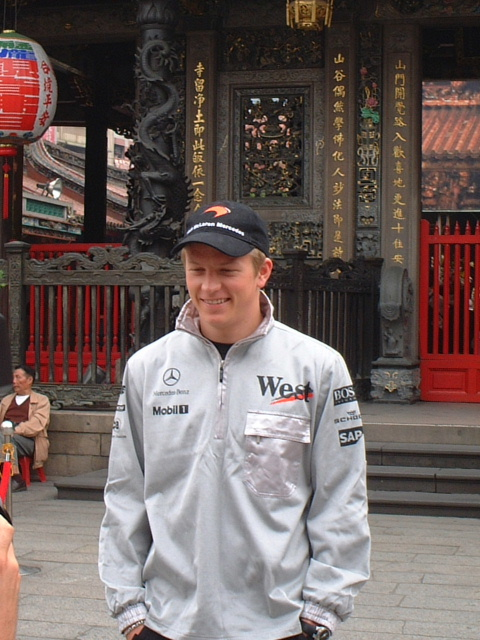
Kimi Räikkönen collided with Jordan driver Takuma Sato during the late stages of qualifying, leading to his fastest qualifying lap time to be cancelled.

Irvine, sixth, had his first two runs hampered by a gear change malfunction, made an error on his third, and was slowed by traffic on his fourth. Coulthard was irritated because his tyres were slow to heat up, and he lost a lot of time sliding over the second chicane kerbing on his first run. His last run was aborted because of the stoppage, leaving him seventh. De la Rosa qualified eighth in the spare Jaguar, despite experiencing a differential issue and a misfire on a few runs. During his second run, Villeneuve made some driver errors while braking for the Ascari chicane and the last turn, taking ninth. Salo completed the top ten qualifiers with the Toyota's fast straightline speed. Trulli improved on each of his runs and slipstreamed his teammate Button on the straights during his final run to finish 11th, but lost time at Parabolica corner. Jordan's Giancarlo Fisichella was 12th after executing a two-run strategy, although his second swift effort was hampered by the stoppage. McNish's crew employed a four-lap plan after realising Toyota could go quicker on the second run, but traffic on his second run kept him 13th. Sauber's Massa and Heidfeld were 14th and 15th, respectively. Massa used scrubbed tyres to increase frontal grip for his first run, but had excess understeer on a new set of tyres on his second run. He added downforce to his car for his final run, which resulted in his quickest lap. Heidfeld ran wide leaving the second Lesmo corner, unable to improve on his fastest lap time from the first run. Panis, 16th was unhappy with his car's handling balance and struggled in traffic. Button. 17th, was unhappy with the Renault's balance. Sato qualified 18th after failing to complete an entire flying lap owing to driving errors and a collision with Räikkönen. The two Minardi drivers completed the starting order in 19th and 20th. Mark Webber's aerodynamic setup was changed for qualifying, while teammate Yoong's final run was hampered by the stoppage, costing him his final two timed laps despite dialling out excess understeer in his car.

=== Post-qualifying ===
Sato confronted McLaren CEO Ron Dennis in the garage about his collision with Räikkönen, who was clutching an ice pack on his left elbow. The race stewards summoned Räikkönen and Sato to discuss their perspectives on the incident. The stewards determined that Räikkönen was at fault for the collision and cancelled his fastest qualifying lap time. This demoted Räikkönen to sixth and promoted Irvine to fifth.

=== Qualifying classification ===
Pos	No	Driver	Constructor	Lap	Gap	Grid
1	6	(Colombia) Juan Pablo Montoya	Williams-BMW	1:20.264	—	1
2	1	(Germany) Michael Schumacher	Ferrari	1:20.521	+0.257	2
3	5	(Germany) Ralf Schumacher	Williams-BMW	1:20.542	+0.278	3
4	2	(Brazil) Rubens Barrichello	Ferrari	1:20.705	+0.442	4
5	16	(United Kingdom) Eddie Irvine	Jaguar-Cosworth	1:21.606	+1.342	5
6	4	(Finland) Kimi Räikkönen	McLaren-Mercedes	1:21.712^{1}	+1.448	6
7	3	(United Kingdom) David Coulthard	McLaren-Mercedes	1:21.803	+1.539	7
8	17	(Spain) Pedro de la Rosa	Jaguar-Cosworth	1:21.960	+1.696	8
9	11	(Canada) Jacques Villeneuve	BAR-Honda	1:22.126	+1.862	9
10	24	(Finland) Mika Salo	Toyota	1:22.318	+2.054	10
11	14	(Italy) Jarno Trulli	Renault	1:22.383	+2.119	11
12	9	(Italy) Giancarlo Fisichella	Jordan-Honda	1:22.515	+2.251	12
13	25	(United Kingdom) Allan McNish	Toyota	1:22.521	+2.257	13
14	8	(Brazil) Felipe Massa	Sauber-Petronas	1:22.565	+2.301	14
15	7	(Germany) Nick Heidfeld	Sauber-Petronas	1:22.601	+2.337	15
16	12	(France) Olivier Panis	BAR-Honda	1:22.645	+2.381	16
17	15	(United Kingdom) Jenson Button	Renault	1:22.714	+2.450	17
18	10	(Japan) Takuma Sato	Jordan-Honda	1:23.166	+2.902	18
19	23	(Australia) Mark Webber	Minardi-Asiatech	1:23.794	+3.530	19
20	22	(Malaysia) Alex Yoong	Minardi-Asiatech	1:25.111	+4.847	20
107% time: 1:25.882

Notes

- ^1 – Kimi Räikkönen's fastest time (1:21.163) was cancelled following a collision with Takuma Sato during qualifying, this dropped him one place from fifth to sixth.

== Warm-up ==
On race morning, a half-hour warm-up session was held in warm, sunny weather. Ralf Schumacher led with a lap time of 1:24.480, followed by Barrichello, Montoya, Michael Schumacher, Räikkönen, Panis, Massa, Coulthard, Salo and Heidfeld in positions two to ten. There were no major incidents during the session. Sato made a slight driver error and ran off the track at Parabolica corner while Barrichello outbraked himself and ended up in the gravel trap at Curva del Vialone turn. Villeneuve stalled after exiting the pit lane, forcing him to push his car into the pit lane so his mechanics could retrieve it, and Salo had a probable gearbox issue.

== Race ==
The 53-lap race started before a crowd of 60,000 spectators at 14:00 local time. The weather conditions at the circuit were dry and sunny; the air temperature was from 24 to 26 °C (75 to 79 °F) and the asphalt temperature was between 33 and 35 °C (91 and 95 °F). Because the crew noticed a fuel pressure supply issue in Ralf Schumacher's race car, he swapped to the spare Williams car. Trulli did not launch on the dummy grid because he struggled to choose first gear for the formation lap due to a gear selection fault, although he avoided running personnel from other teams when he did. This required him to start the race from the rear of the grid.

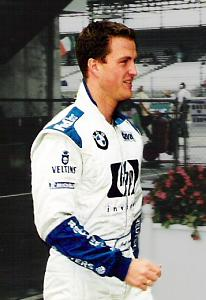
Ralf Schumacher illegally took the lead from teammate Montoya at the start and was ordered by the stewards to hand it back.

When the lights went out to begin the race, Montoya made a slow start and steered to the right to block Michael Schumacher from overtaking him in an effort to keep the race lead. This allowed Ralf Schumacher to drive alongside him on the inside line into the Rettifilo chicane. Michael Schumacher was hampered by the two Williams cars and had to slow down beside his teammate Barrichello. Ralf Schumacher was on the inside at the first chicane's second apex, and braked too late for the turn, almost colliding with teammate Montoya. He cut the chicane before the first left-hand corner, evaded the speed bumps intended to slow cars, and illegally claimed the lead. Barrichello had passed Michael Schumacher on the inside for third. Williams contacted FIA race director Charlie Whiting, who responded that Ralf Schumacher had to hand over the lead to Montoya in order to avoid an official sanction for passing off the circuit. Coulthard collided with Räikkönen's McLaren rear after the first chicane because he was slow to react to his teammate braking to avoid a car ahead of him, removing his front wing and necessitating a pit stop for a replacement nose cone. McNish had the best start in the field, moving from 13th to seventh at the end of the first lap, while Panis improved four spots in the same distance. At the end of the first lap, Ralf Schumacher led Montoya by half-a-second, followed by Barrichello, Michael Schumacher, Räikkönen and Irvine.

Ralf Schumacher began to pull away slowly from Montoya. Villeneuve passed Heidfeld for tenth, Button passed Massa for 13th and Yoong overtook teammate Webber for 18th. Ralf Schumacher set a new fastest lap, a 1:26.230 on lap three, but was later eclipsed by Barrichello. Villeneuve was overtaken by Trulli on the same lap and Webber reclaimed 18th from Yoong. The stewards told Williams to tell Ralf Schumacher to give up first place to Montoya, which Sam Michael, Williams' Senior Operations Engineer, relayed to Schumacher at the end of lap four. Ralf Schumacher was about to let his teammate pass at the exit of Parabolica corner to comply with the instruction when he pulled over to the side of the track at the Rettifilo chicane with smoke billowing from his engine due to a loss of pressure in the engine's pneumatic valve system on the start/finish straight, becoming the race's first retirement at the start of lap five. His teammate Montoya temporarily took the lead, but he had lost momentum and was blinded by smoke, allowing Barrichello to move into the inside line, and after driving in Montoya's slipstream, he passed the Williams driver for the lead under braking into the Rettifilo chicane.

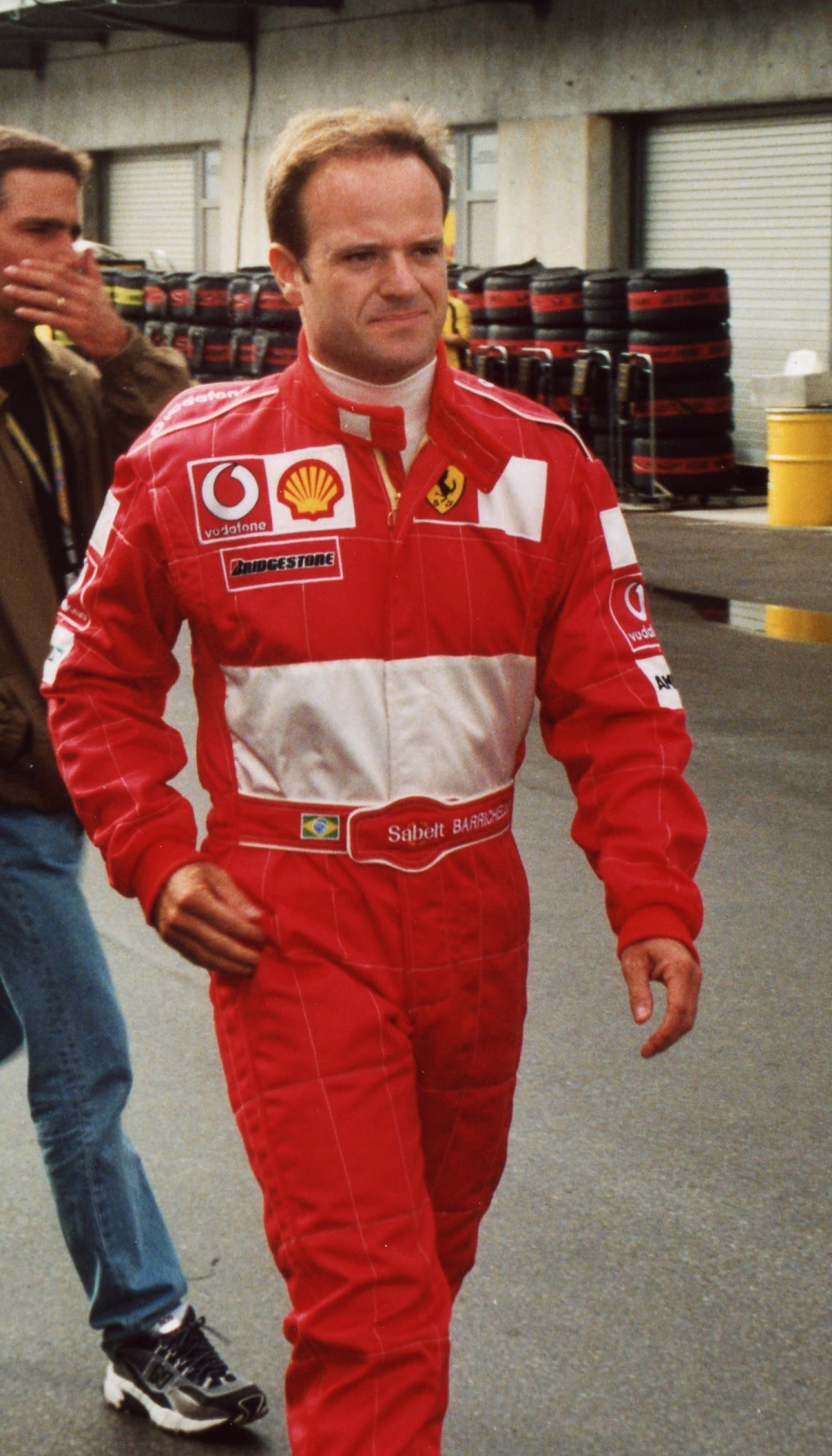
Rubens Barrichello took his third victory of the season and the fourth of his car by 0.255 seconds over teammate Michael Schumacher.

On lap five, in an attempt to catch Barrichello, Montoya ran wide and across the Variante della Roggia chicane. This allowed Michael Schumacher to bridge the gap and pass Montoya on the outside down the start/finish straight for second on lap six. Two laps later, Salo went wide at the second Lesmo turn, allowing Panis to pass him for seventh. On lap eight, Barrichello began to extend his advantage over teammate Michael Schumacher, who went wide at the Lesmo turns. The Ferrari drivers were running contrasting strategies: Barrichello on a two-stop strategy and Michael Schumacher on a one-stop strategy; this provided Barrichello a lighter car early in the race, and his starting fourth forced Ferrari to consider an attack. Following Ralf Schumacher's retirement, McNish was in sixth place, battling Panis for the position. His Toyota's handling had become unpredictable; he feared a slow puncture or suspension failure. McNish entered the pit lane on lap 13 for a front suspension check and remained stationary for 25.9 seconds. He retired in the garage on lap 15 due to a broken front-right suspension and was thus robbed of his chance of scoring a potential first-ever podium.

De la Rosa cut the first chicane and overtook Massa for 12th on lap 16. On lap 17, Massa repassed the Jaguar into the Ascari chicane, but De la Rosa's front-left and Massa's right-rear wheels collided under braking. The accident damaged De la Rosa's front-left suspension and wheel, forcing him to retire, while Massa had a right-rear puncture, potentially as a result of the contact, sending him through the gravel trap on lap 18. The first round of pit stops began on lap 18. When Barrichello made his first pit stop for fuel and tyres on the following lap, he had already pulled 16.7 seconds ahead of teammate Michael Schumacher with a series of fastest laps. His stop lasted 8.4 seconds and dropped to second, ahead of Montoya. On lap 22, Webber retired at the Variante delle Roggia chicane with no power due to an engine control unit failure. By lap 25, Barrichello had closed the gap to race leader Michael Schumacher to 8.4 seconds. Michael Schumacher made his one and only pit stop on lap 28. His stop took 10.8 seconds, and he rejoined in third behind Barrichello and Montoya.

Räikkönen retired on the 31st lap due to a major V10 engine failure, which caused smoke to billow from the rear of his McLaren into Parabolica corner. His retirement promoted Salo to fourth, Irvine to fifth and Panis to sixth. On the same lap, Montoya made his first and only pit stop from second. He rejoined the track in third after an 11.4-second stop. On lap 31, Salo made his only pit stop of the race, crossing the white line dividing the pit lane exit from the race track. Montoya cut the first chicane, went through the gravel trap, and damaged his barge board's bodywork before understeering over the rumble strips at the next chicane on lap 33. He entered the pit lane with his front right wheel elevated in the air after mounting the kerbing and retiring from the race. Montoya's retirement moved Irvine to third and Panis to fourth. Salo received a drive-through penalty for crossing the white line at the pit lane exit on that same lap. Salo took the penalty on lap 35, thereby ending his chances of gaining points.

Barrichello made his second pit stop from the race lead on lap 37. His stop lasted 8.4 seconds, and he rejoined the circuit just ahead of his teammate Michael Schumacher, whose pace was almost two seconds slower than his previous laps and would continue to slow dramatically on the next laps. Fisichella and Coulthard made their pit stops on the following lap. On lap 40, Irvine let the yet-to-stop Panis past him for third place at the Parabolica chicane after Panis got a good run into the corner. Panis made his second scheduled pit stop two laps later, returning Irvine to third. He rejoined the track in sixth place, trailing Renault's Trulli and Button. Running on newer tyres, Coulthard passed Villeneuve for eighth on lap 43 and caught Fisichella by lap 47. On lap 48, Coulthard overtook Fisichella for fifth, but ran wide across the Variante chicane and had to let Fisichella reclaim the spot to avoid a penalty. On lap 52, he made another attempt at the first chicane and was successful.

Barrichello led by 17 seconds but slowed in the last laps to allow the two Ferraris to finish together, and Michael Schumacher was behind his teammate by the final lap. He held on to the lead for the rest of the race, winning his third race of the season and fourth in Formula One. Michael Schumacher finished in second, 0.255 seconds behind. Despite being ordered not to use launch control for fear of issues, Irvine finished third for Jaguar's and his first podium since the 2001 Monaco Grand Prix, becoming the only driver not from Ferrari, McLaren, or Williams to achieve a top three finish. Renault recorded their first double-points finish of the season. Trulli finished fourth after starting at the back of the grid. In his first points score for four races, Button finished fifth after Renault issued a team order telling him to let Trulli pass so he could close in on Irvine after the pit stop cycle. Panis was the final points-scorer in sixth, his second championship points score of the season. Coulthard was seventh, with Fisichella eighth after a launch control issue and his car carrying a large amount of fuel at the start. Villeneuve's one-stop strategy with extra wing did not result in him overtaking drivers or preventing himself from being passed, leaving him ninth. Heidfeld claimed tenth with a two-stop strategy. Salo in 11th had blistered tyres early on. Sato spun during the race and was 12th. Yoong finished last following a lengthy pit stop caused by the engine cutting out due to an anti-stall issue that needed to be resolved in the Minardi garage. A total of 13 out of the 20 starters finished the race.

=== Post-race ===
The top three drivers appeared on the podium to collect their trophies and spoke to the media in the subsequent press conference. Barrichello complimented the Ferrari test team for their work the week prior, which allowed the team to select the right Bridgestone tyres, "I have no words for them because it was really the tyre to have. It was unbelievable. From the test last week to now it was just the tyre to have." Michael Schumacher commented on finishing in second, "I did enjoy it because this was the ideal result we dreamed of. I didn't want to go that far and wish myself such a result because we've had so much luck this year and so many good results that I thought whatever comes is going to be fine but this is obviously a dream result." Irvine contrasted the difference of scoring frequent podium results at Ferrari with taking infrequent ones with Jaguar, "it must be great to be back but to be on the podium here, when you've been away for so long, you know, whenever I was at Ferrari it was like podium, podium, podium. There's nothing like being away for a while."

Ross Brawn, Ferrari's technical director, indicated that it was not for him to talk about the importance of Ferrari's win at Monza, but noted, "It was the perfect answer to those who ask if we are fed up with winning." Jaguar team principal Niki Lauda praised Irvine's performance in the Grand Prix, "He did a perfect job, didn't make any mistakes, and it was a great weekend for the team. We have all been working for a long time to achieve this." Trulli said that he had believed he had "lost everything at the start" when first gear failed to engage at the start of the formation lap but added that finishing in fourth was "pretty unexpected!" His teammate Button commented that finishing fifth was a "pretty unexpected result" and that Renault placing fourth and fifth reminded him of the 2001 German Grand Prix, when the team's predecessor Benetton scored a double points finish on an unsuitable circuit. Panis heralded his sixth-place result, "I'm absolutely delighted to finish 6th today. To get a point after starting 16th on the grid is fantastic for us. It was a tough race with plenty of action but I took the risk of a two-stop strategy and it worked for me."

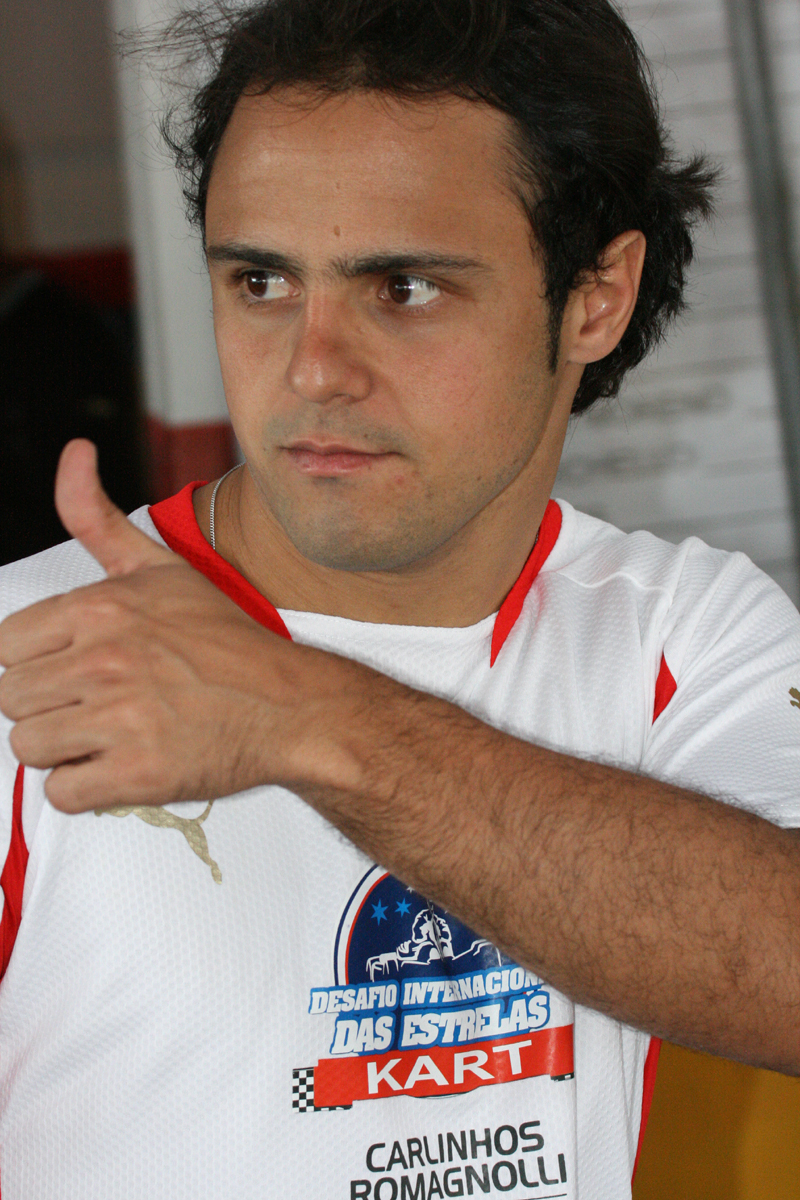
Felipe Massa (pictured in 2007) was the first driver to be imposed a ten-place grid penalty after being deemed by the stewards to be the cause of a collision between himself and Jaguar driver Pedro de la Rosa.

The race stewards summoned Massa and De la Rosa following their collision with each other. They reviewed video footage and spoke to both drivers. Massa was deemed at fault, and in accordance with the new regulations that season, became the first driver to receive a ten-place grid penalty for the following United States Grand Prix. Massa said De la Rosa was so slow entering the Ascari chicane that he drove to the circuit's centre and was passed as far as he was concerned. De la Rosa was angry with Massa, saying, "He is the worst guy you can meet. I missed the chicane and I let him by again and he drove across my front suspension at full speed which is unbelievable." Sauber team owner Peter Sauber argued Massa's penalty was harsh but said the team had accepted it. Räikkönen stated that he could have finished third but that his engine problem was beyond his control.

Michael Schumacher's second-place finish meant he had scored 128 championship points in the World Drivers' Championship, breaking his own record of scoring the most championship points in a single season of 123 points set in 2001. Barrichello's victory put him 17 points clear of Montoya in third place, with 20 championship points available in the final two races. In the World Constructors' Championship, Ferrari extended their unassailable advantage over Williams to 103 championship points, while McLaren secured third with two races remaining in the season.

=== Race classification ===
Drivers who scored championship points are denoted in bold.

Pos	No	Driver	Constructor	Tyre	Laps	Time/Retired	Grid	Points
1	2	(Brazil) **Rubens Barrichello**	**Ferrari**	B	53	1:16:19.982	4	10
2	1	(Germany) **Michael Schumacher**	**Ferrari**	B	53	+ 0.255	2	6
3	16	(United Kingdom) **Eddie Irvine**	**Jaguar-Cosworth**	M	53	+ 52.579	5	4
4	14	(Italy) **Jarno Trulli**	**Renault**	M	53	+ 58.219	11^{2}	3
5	15	(United Kingdom) **Jenson Button**	**Renault**	M	53	+ 1:07.770	17	2
6	12	(France) **Olivier Panis**	**BAR-Honda**	B	53	+ 1:08.491	16	1
7	3	(United Kingdom) David Coulthard	McLaren-Mercedes	M	53	+ 1:09.047	7	
8	9	(Italy) Giancarlo Fisichella	Jordan-Honda	B	53	+ 1:10.891	12	
9	11	(Canada) Jacques Villeneuve	BAR-Honda	B	53	+ 1:21.068	9	
10	7	(Germany) Nick Heidfeld	Sauber-Petronas	B	53	+ 1:22.046	15	
11	24	(Finland) Mika Salo	Toyota	M	52	+ 1 Lap	10	
12	10	(Japan) Takuma Sato	Jordan-Honda	B	52	+ 1 Lap	18	
13	22	(Malaysia) Alex Yoong	Minardi-Asiatech	M	47	+ 6 Laps	20	
Ret	6	(Colombia) Juan Pablo Montoya	Williams-BMW	M	33	Chassis	1	
Ret	4	(Finland) Kimi Räikkönen	McLaren-Mercedes	M	29	Engine	6	
Ret	23	(Australia) Mark Webber	Minardi-Asiatech	M	20	Engine	19	
Ret	8	(Brazil) Felipe Massa	Sauber-Petronas	B	16	Collision damage	14	
Ret	17	(Spain) Pedro de la Rosa	Jaguar-Cosworth	M	15	Collision	8	
Ret	25	(United Kingdom) Allan McNish	Toyota	M	12	Suspension	13	
Ret	5	(Germany) Ralf Schumacher	Williams-BMW	M	4	Engine	3	

Notes

- **^2** – Jarno Trulli started the race from the back of the grid after gear selection issues on the formation lap.

== Championship standings after the race ==
Drivers' Championship standings

+/–	Pos	Driver	Points
	1	(Germany) Michael Schumacher*	128
	2	(Brazil) Rubens Barrichello	61
	3	(Colombia) Juan Pablo Montoya	44
	4	(Germany) Ralf Schumacher	42
	5	(United Kingdom) David Coulthard	37

Constructors' Championship standings

+/–	Pos	Constructor	Points
	1	(Italy) Ferrari*	189
	2	(United Kingdom) Williams-BMW	86
	3	(United Kingdom) McLaren-Mercedes	57
	4	(France) Renault	20
	5	(Switzerland) Sauber-Petronas	11
Sources:

- Note: Only the top five positions are included for both sets of standings.
- Bold text and an asterisk indicates the 2002 World Champions.

Previous race: 2002 Belgian Grand Prix	FIA Formula One World Championship; 2002 season	Next race: 2002 United States Grand Prix
Previous race: 2001 Italian Grand Prix	Italian Grand Prix	Next race: 2003 Italian Grand Prix
