= Irrigation controller =

Device operating automatic irrigation systems

An irrigation controller is a device to operate automatic irrigation systems such as lawn sprinklers and drip irrigation systems. Most controllers have a means of setting the frequency of irrigation, the start time, and the duration of watering. Some controllers have additional features such as multiple programs to allow different watering frequencies for different types of plants, rain delay settings, input terminals for sensors such as rain and freeze sensors, soil moisture sensors, weather data, remote operation, etc.

There are two basic types of controllers, electric and hydraulic. Most automatic irrigation valves are diaphragm valves in which the water above the diaphragm must be discharged for the valve to open. In a hydraulic system, the controller and valves are connected via small plastic tubes approximately 4 mm (¼ in) in diameter. The controller opens the tube connected to the valve, allowing that valve to open.

Most newer systems employ electromechanical or electronic controllers. In this scenario, the controller is connected to an electrical circuit that operates a solenoid attached to each valve (solenoid valve). When the solenoid is actuated, the water above the diaphragm is relieved, and the valve opens.

Although sophisticated controllers that allow irrigation schedules to be automatically adjusted according to the weather have been available for many years, until recently, these controllers were out of reach of the average consumer. One type is evapotranspiration controllers or "ET controllers". Several manufacturers are now producing controllers that can be automatically updated by either a simple weather sensor, via a pager that receives a daily update from a network of local weather stations, or through soil moisture sensors. Several companies have also introduced products that gather information from the internet to update the watering schedule.

There are broadly two categories of irrigation controllers: domestic ones for gardening applications, and professional controllers for more demanding agricultural applications. While most domestic (gardening) controllers can only open/close zones based on a time duration, without any feedback from the irrigation process, professional irrigation controllers can irrigate based on volume (quantities defined in cubic meters / Gallons), receive feedback from the process, and react to actual events happening during the process.

For example, the typical professional controller will calculate the actual flow rate running in the system when a specific zone is operated, compare this to a pre-configured required amount, and adjust the irrigation process if deviation from the zone's flow rate is detected; This mechanism is called "Flow monitoring", and can prevent irrigation when a burst is occurring in the main line or in the zone's hydraulic components. The controller can also alert the operator locally via its interface, or remotely by sending an SMS or a message to a central control.

== See also ==
- Timer
- Soil moisture sensor
