= Robert H. Hume =

Robert Hume
- Hume brothers cross the finish line in 1944 hand-in-hand
- Born: September 18, 1922; Monmouth, Illinois, U.S.
- Died: February 28, 1999 (aged 76); Kalamazoo, Michigan, U.S.
- Education: University of Michigan
- Occupation: Medical doctor
- Known for: NCAA mile run champion, 1941

Robert Humiston Hume (September 18, 1922 – February 28, 1999) was the 1944 NCAA champion in the outdoor mile run. He was inducted into the University of Michigan Athletic Hall of Honor in 1990. He and his twin brother, H. Ross Hume, became famous in 1944 and 1945 as the "dead heat twins" due to their practice of finishing their races hand-in-hand in an intentional effort to finish each race tied for the win. During the 1944 track season, the Hume twins tied for the win in nine straight mile races, including the Big Ten Conference and NCAA championships. They were co-winners in every mile event they entered in 1944 except one. The exception occurred at a dual meet in which "a meticulous official ruled that one of the Humes beat the other across the finish line by a couple of inches although they were hand in hand at the wire." Their best time in a "dead heat" mile with hands clasped was 4:14.6 at the Central Collegiate Conference meet in 1944; the time broke a University of Michigan school record of 4:16.4 that had been set by H.L. Carroll 28 years earlier in 1916.

The Hume twins were raised in Canonsburg, a small town in Pennsylvania’s soft coal region, not far from Pittsburgh. Robert Hume set the school record for the mile, and Ross set the record in the half mile. After graduating from Canonsburg High School, the Hume twins enrolled at the University of Michigan to run track under Coach Ken Doherty. One sports columnist in 1945 noted that the Humes were "twins in every possible manner, facial resemblance, running style, the clothes they wear, and the courses they are taking."

In his track career at Michigan, Robert Hume won one NCAA championship and four Big Ten Conference championships. He won the 1944 NCAA outdoor mile run in a dead heat with his brother. He won four Big Ten championships from 1943-1946. His Big Ten championships were in the indoor and outdoor mile runs in 1944 and 1945, all four of which were shared "dead heat" wins with his brother. Robert Hume was named an NCAA All-American in 1944 and was also selected as the captain of Michigan’s track team that year.

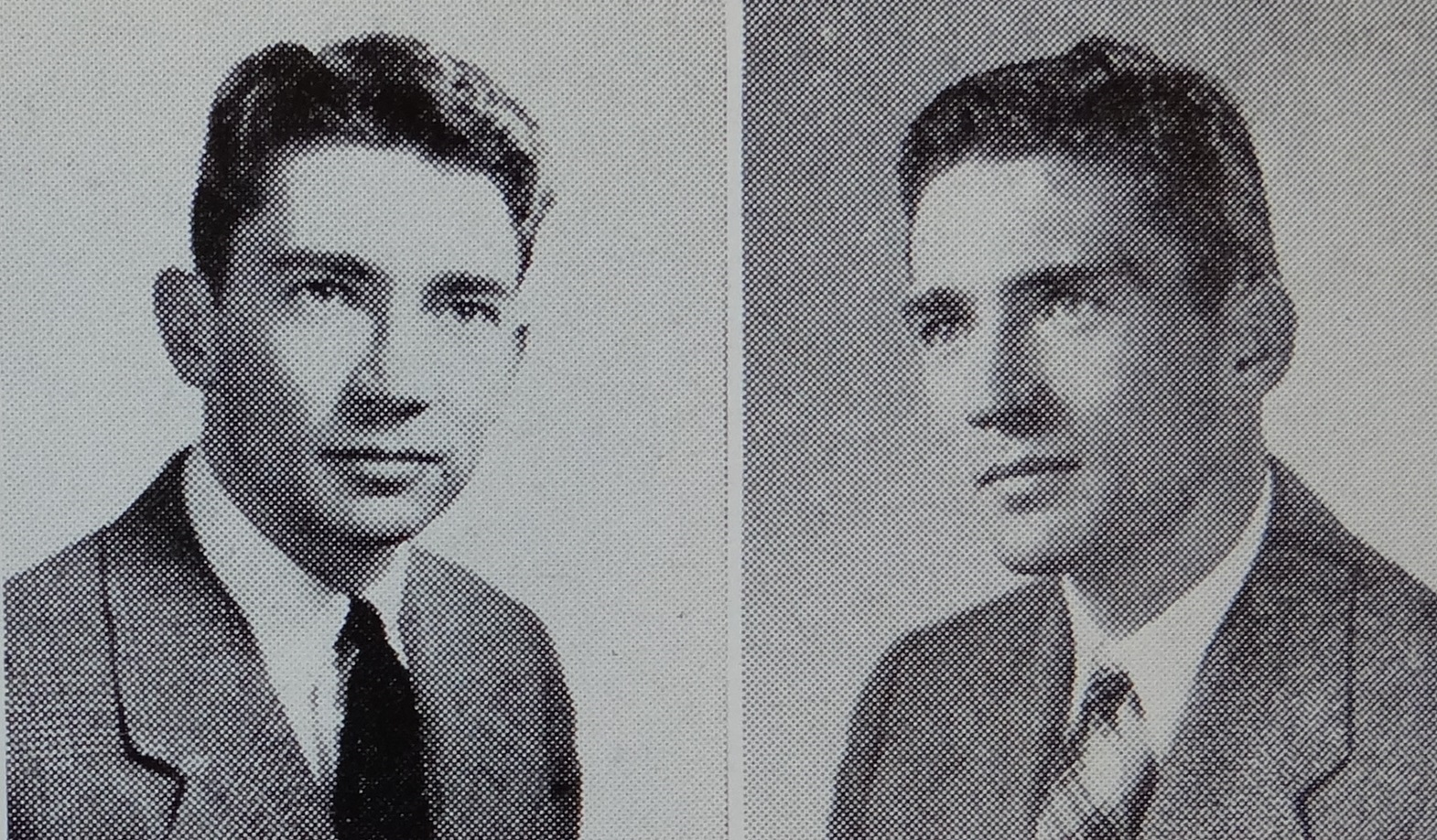
Hume twins from 1948 Michiganensian

The Hume twins' practice of interlocking hands in "dead heat" wins drew national publicity and also controversy. Associated Press columnist Jimmy Jordan dubbed them the "dead heat twins." Another writer referred to them as the "Dead Heat Kids." The publicity peaked in June 1944 when "Michigan's famous distance running twins raced to their ninth straight dead-heat victory in the mile run of the 23rd National Collegiate Athletic Association track and field championship meet tonight, finishing hand-in-hand more than 100 yards ahead of the next runner." A columnist in Massachusetts wrote:

"As the twins finished their sophomore year at Michigan, [Coach Ken] Doherty decided to run them in the mile and two mile races together … this proved to be a happy solution … the twins like to run together .. they’ve been doing that since before their school days .. furthermore, they usually finish so far in front that the last 50 yards finds that they are clasping hands and hit the tape together."

United Press columnist Bob Meyer noted that they "deliberately have finished in a dead heat for first place in every mile except one in which both were entered this year," and suggested that the twins "possibly may forget their sentimental trick of locking hands for a dead-heat finish in order to defeat a tough field and slice another second or 2 off their CCC time."

As a result of the Humes’ practice, the NCAA passed a rule in 1946 stating that athletes would no longer be able to tie in any track meets.

After graduating from Michigan, Robert Hume became a general surgeon. His brother Ross became an orthopedic surgeon. The brothers were each inducted into the University of Michigan Athletic Hall of Honor in 1990. Robert died in 1999, and Ross followed in 2000.

== See also ==
- University of Michigan Athletic Hall of Honor
- H. Ross Hume
