= Dead heat =

Common expression used in horse racing and other sports to describe a tie

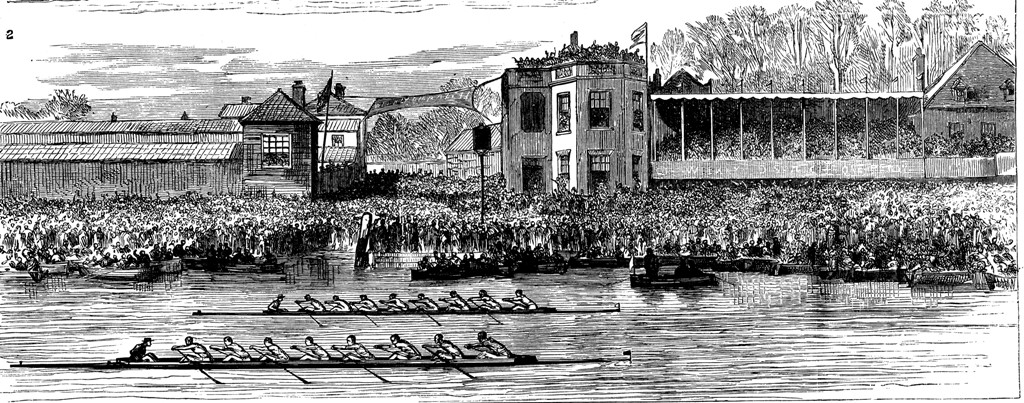
The 1877 Boat Race ended in the only dead heat in the history of the competition

A dead heat is a rare situation in various racing sports in which the performances of competitors are judged to be so close that no difference between them can be resolved. The result is declared a tie and the competitors are awarded a joint ranking. Dead heats can occur in both head-to-head races and competitions where competitors race sequentially and are ranked by finishing time.

Photo finishes have been a long-standing method of resolving outcomes too ambiguous to be distinguished by the naked eye. Improvements in technology, including digital super-slow motion replay and pressure-sensitive digital timers, have increased precision in resolving dead heats. Consequently, dead heats are declared less often than they once were.

== Etymology ==
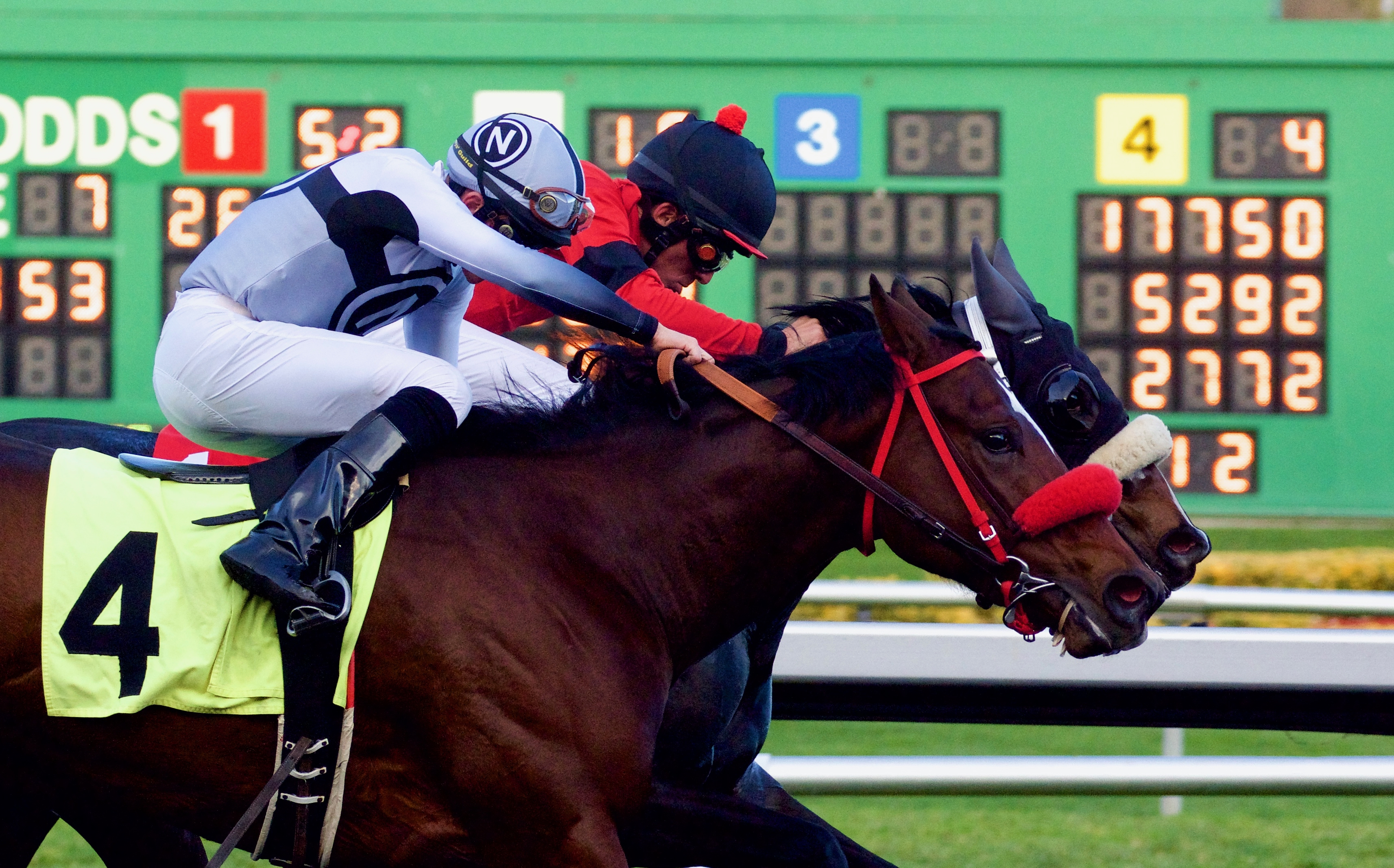
A dead heat in horse racing

The Oxford English Dictionary attributes the term to horse racing. Meets formerly had the same horses run several "heats" in a day, with victors being decided by the total number of wins. A heat which had no clear single winner was discounted from these tallies and was therefore "dead".

== Occurrence ==
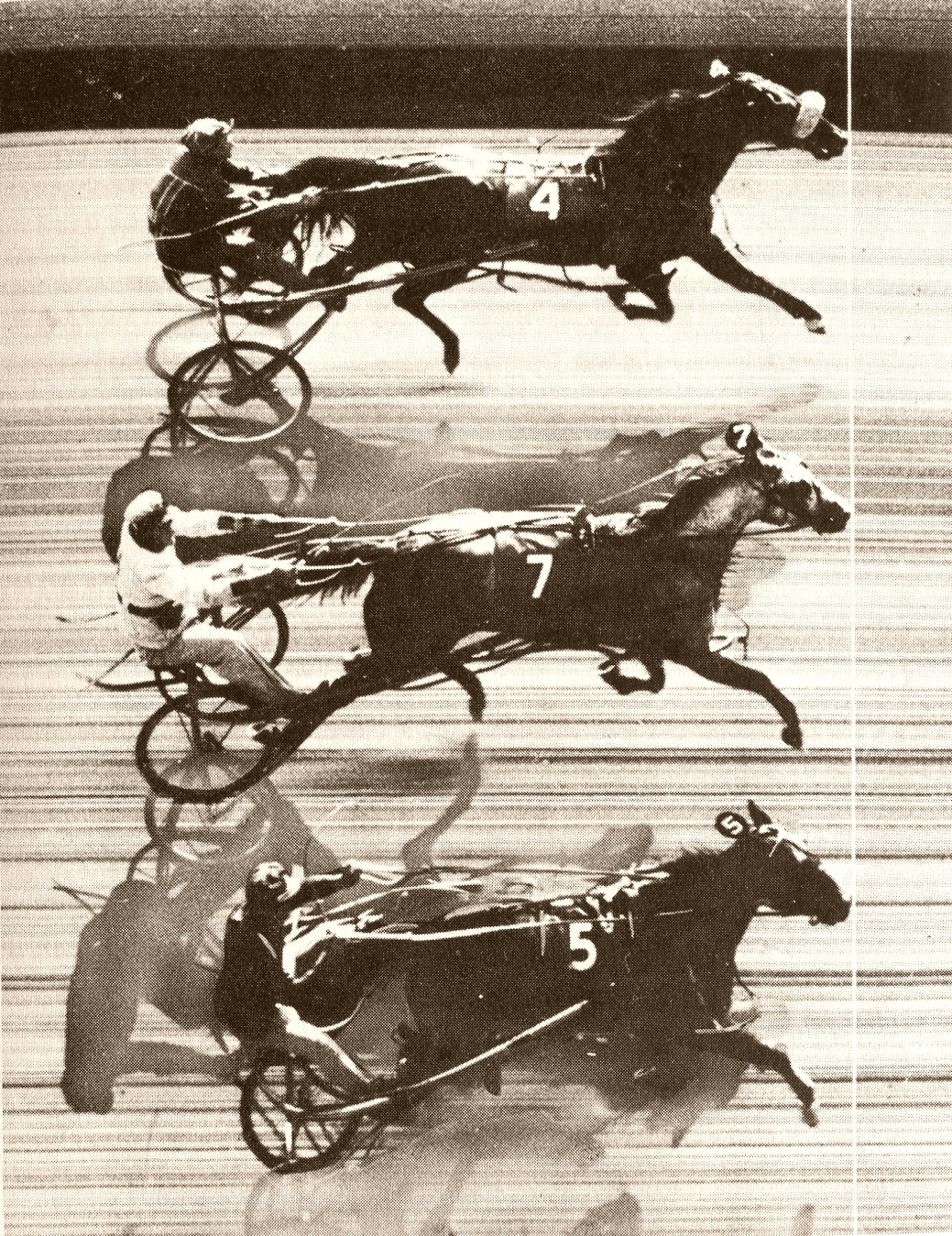
An extremely rare photo finish triple dead heat, recorded in a 1953 harness race at New Jersey's Freehold Raceway

Dead heats are very rare, and situations with three (or more) competitors in a dead heat are exceptionally so. The frequency of dead heats varies between sports, depending on the typical variance in performances and the precision of the technology available. The use of the photo finish, first introduced in horse racing in second quarter of the 20th century, notably decreased the number of dead heats. Both of the two recorded quadruple dead heats in horse racing occurred in England in the 1850s.

Swimming has a relatively high number of dead heats because, under FINA rules (which includes Olympic events), positions are based on race timings which are limited in precision to hundredths of a second; this is despite the availability of technology that could provide further precision. The reason for this is that the length of lanes can vary by up to 3 centimetres (1.2 in), with lower-precision timing compensating for the possible differences between the distances competitors have travelled.

Occasionally racers will try to deliberately engineer a dead heat. During the mid-1940s, twin distance runners H. Ross Hume and Robert H. Hume became known as the "dead heat twins" for their practice of finishing their races hand-in-hand in intentional efforts to share victory. At the 2002 United States Grand Prix in Indianapolis, Ferrari teammates Rubens Barrichello and Michael Schumacher attempted to tie for first place, but Barrichello was adjudicated to have won by 0.011 seconds.

In Formula One qualifying, dead heats have occurred only twice since times were recorded to the thousands of a seconds. At the 1997 European Grand Prix in Jerez, Michael Schumacher, Jacques Villeneuve, and Heinz-Harald Frentzen all posted the same qualifying time. The positions were then determined based on who posted the time first, which resulted in Villeneuve acquiring pole position. 27 years later, the 2024 Canadian Grand Prix saw George Russell and Max Verstappen both posting the same time, but Russell, having set the time first, received the pole position.

== Outcome ==
If a dead heat is declared, all tied competitors are considered to have jointly achieved the superior position (unless a tie-breaking method is used to separate them). This does not affect awards for subsequent finishers. For example, in the final of the Women's 100 metre freestyle at the 2016 Summer Olympics, Penny Oleksiak and Simone Manuel finished in a dead heat for first place. Both were awarded gold medals, no silver medal was awarded, and the next finisher, Sarah Sjöström, received bronze.

Prizes for the tied competitors may be divided. The rules of FIA-organised championships, for example, specify that a dead heat in a championship would result in all the World Championship points for the tied positions being added together and divided equally between the tied competitors. For example, at the 2024 Monza Formula 2 round where Dennis Hauger and Gabriel Bortoleto both finished in 8th place in the sprint race, scoring 0.5 points each. Complications can occur if the reward cannot be divided or duplicated: at the Women's 100 meters at the 2012 United States Olympic Track Trials, Jeneba Tarmoh and Allyson Felix finished in a dead heat for the third and final place in the US Olympic team, with there being no provision in the rules to resolve the situation (a head-to-head run-off was proposed, but Tarmoh eventually conceded the place).

In Grand Prix motorcycle racing, joint rankings are resolved by using fastest lap times as a tiebreaker. This rule resulted in Héctor Faubel winning the 125cc classification of the 2011 German motorcycle Grand Prix after a photo finish could not separate him and Johann Zarco.

Special provision is made for dead heats in the rules of sports betting: punters' stakes are divided proportionally by the number of tied competitors.

== See also ==
- List of dead heat horse races
- Photo finish
