= 2002 United States Grand Prix =

Formula One motor race

Coordinates: 39°47′42″N 86°14′05″W

Race 16 of 17 in the 2002 Formula One World Championship
| ← Previous race | Next race → |

Race details
- Date: September 29, 2002
- Official name: 2002 SAP United States Grand Prix
- Location: Indianapolis Motor Speedway; Speedway, Indiana
- Course: Permanent racing facility
- Course length: 4.192 km (2.605 miles)
- Distance: 73 laps, 306.016 km (190.150 miles)
- Weather: Sunny with temperatures reaching up to 26.7 °C (80.1 °F); Wind speeds approaching a maximum of 18.70 km/h (11.62 mph); Track 34 °C (93 °F)

Pole position
| Driver | (Germany) Michael Schumacher | Ferrari |
- Time: 1:10.790

Fastest lap
| Driver | (Brazil) Rubens Barrichello | Ferrari |
- Time: 1:12.738 on lap 27

Podium
| First | (Brazil) Rubens Barrichello | Ferrari |
| Second | (Germany) Michael Schumacher | Ferrari |
| Third | (United Kingdom) David Coulthard | McLaren-Mercedes |

The 2002 United States Grand Prix (formally the 2002 SAP United States Grand Prix) was a Formula One motor race held on September 29, 2002, at the Indianapolis Motor Speedway in Speedway, Indiana, in front of about 125,000 spectators. It was the 16th and penultimate round of the 2002 Formula One World Championship and the third United States Grand Prix at Indianapolis. Ferrari driver Rubens Barrichello won the 73-lap race after starting second. His teammate Michael Schumacher finished second and McLaren's David Coulthard was third.

Michael Schumacher, the World Drivers' Champion, started from pole position after setting the fastest qualifying lap in the one-hour qualifying session. Barrichello started second alongside his teammate, with Coulthard starting third. The first three drivers maintained their positions into the first corner. Michael Schumacher led for most of the race, only ceding it to Barrichello during both pit stop cycles. On the final lap, Michael Schumacher led Barrichello by half a second before allowing his teammate to catch up to him through the final corner and draw alongside him. Barrichello won by 0.011 seconds over Michael Schumacher, his fourth victory of the season and fifth of his career.

The race result secured Barrichello second in the World Drivers' Championship, with Williams driver Juan Pablo Montoya in third position. Montoya had moved three more championship points clear of fourth-placed teammate Ralf Schumacher With one race left in the season, Williams secured second position from McLaren in the World Constructors' Championship, while Ferrari broke McLaren's 1988 record for the most constructors' points scored in a season.

== Background ==
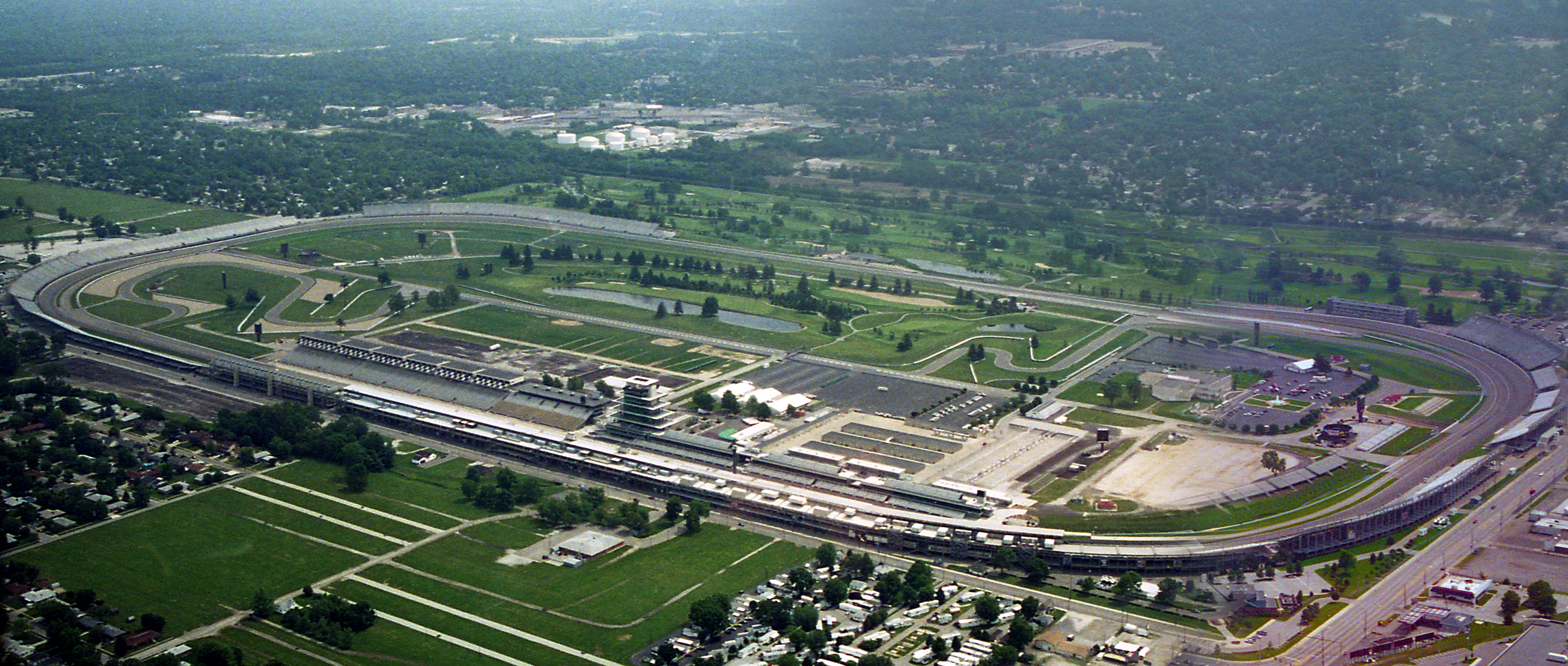
The Indianapolis Motor Speedway, where the race was held

The 2002 United States Grand Prix was the penultimate round of the 2002 Formula One World Championship, held on 29 September 2002, at the 4.192 km (2.605 mi) Indianapolis Motor Speedway (IMS) road course in Speedway, Indiana. It was the third United States Grand Prix hosted at Indianapolis since it was reinstated on the Formula One World Championship calendar in 2000 following a nine-year absence. The Porsche Supercup and the Ferrari Challenge held support races during the weekend. Participating in the Ferrari Challenge, Mandy Williams Reimert was the only woman to race in any of the events that weekend, and consequently, the first woman to race on the speedway's infield road course – which had been inaugurated in 2000.

Before the race, both the World Drivers' Championship and World Constructors' Championship were already won, with Ferrari driver Michael Schumacher having secured the World Drivers' Championship five rounds earlier at the French Grand Prix and Ferrari took the World Constructors' Championship two races after that at the Hungarian Grand Prix, with Williams too many championship points behind to be able to catch them. Rubens Barrichello had to score three championship points in Indianapolis to secure second in the World Drivers' Championship.

Following the Italian Grand Prix on 15 September, several teams tested their cars at European circuits to prepare for the race at Indianapolis. The Williams and McLaren teams tested for four days at the Circuit de Catalunya in Spain before being joined for three of those days by British American Racing (BAR) and Jaguar. McLaren test driver Alexander Wurz led the first and second days, regular driver David Coulthard the third day, and BAR's Oliver Panis the final day. Renault and Sauber tested at the Silverstone Circuit in Britain for three days and Jordan two of those days. Sauber led all three days through Felipe Massa (day one), Nick Heidfeld (day two), and Heinz-Harald Frentzen (day three). Ferrari did four days of tyre and electronics testing at the Mugello Circuit in Italy, joined by Minardi on the second day. Ferrari test driver Luciano Burti drove three F2002 cars at the Fiorano Circuit on 19 September.

The IMS asphalt pavement was diamond grounded to smooth out several bumps and improve grip for racing vehicles to prevent bottoming out. A pit wall was installed to isolate the circuit from the pit lane entry. The Fédération Internationale de l'Automobile (FIA; Formula One's governing body) agreed to keep turn 13's energy-absorbing Steel And Foam Energy Reduction (SAFER) barrier, which had been installed in all four turns prior to the 2002 Indianapolis 500 that May. Turn 13's barrier was expanded to accommodate racing cars travelling clockwise. Part of turn one's kerb was removed to make its opening slightly wider prior to Saturday's two practice sessions.

Ten constructors entered two drivers each for the event. Sauber team principal Peter Sauber signed their 2003 driver Frentzen to replace Massa for the Grand Prix so that Massa could avoid serving a ten-place grid penalty from his final starting position imposed by the stewards for an avoidable accident with Jaguar's Pedro de la Rosa at the preceding Italian Grand Prix; the wording of the regulations meant the penalty was imposed not on the team but on the driver at the next event not in the driver's next race. Renault's Jenson Button was cleared to race. During testing, he experienced dizzy spells caused by an inner ear infection that affected his balance. Arrows did not enter the race, their third in succession in 2002, because the team continued to be affected by financial trouble.

All teams brought developments for their 2003 cars to Indianapolis. McLaren introduced a new front suspension with the strut attached directly to the hub carrier rather than the lower triangle. BAR supplied lighter-weight Brembo brake calipers than the standard model. Honda provided a new advanced qualifying engine to BAR and Jordan. Toyota debuted a new front aerodynamic layout with smaller aerodynamic profiles behind the front wheels than prior models and two aerodynamic appendages parallel to the bottom in front of the side entrance. The team reverted to the previous configuration for the race.

== Practice ==
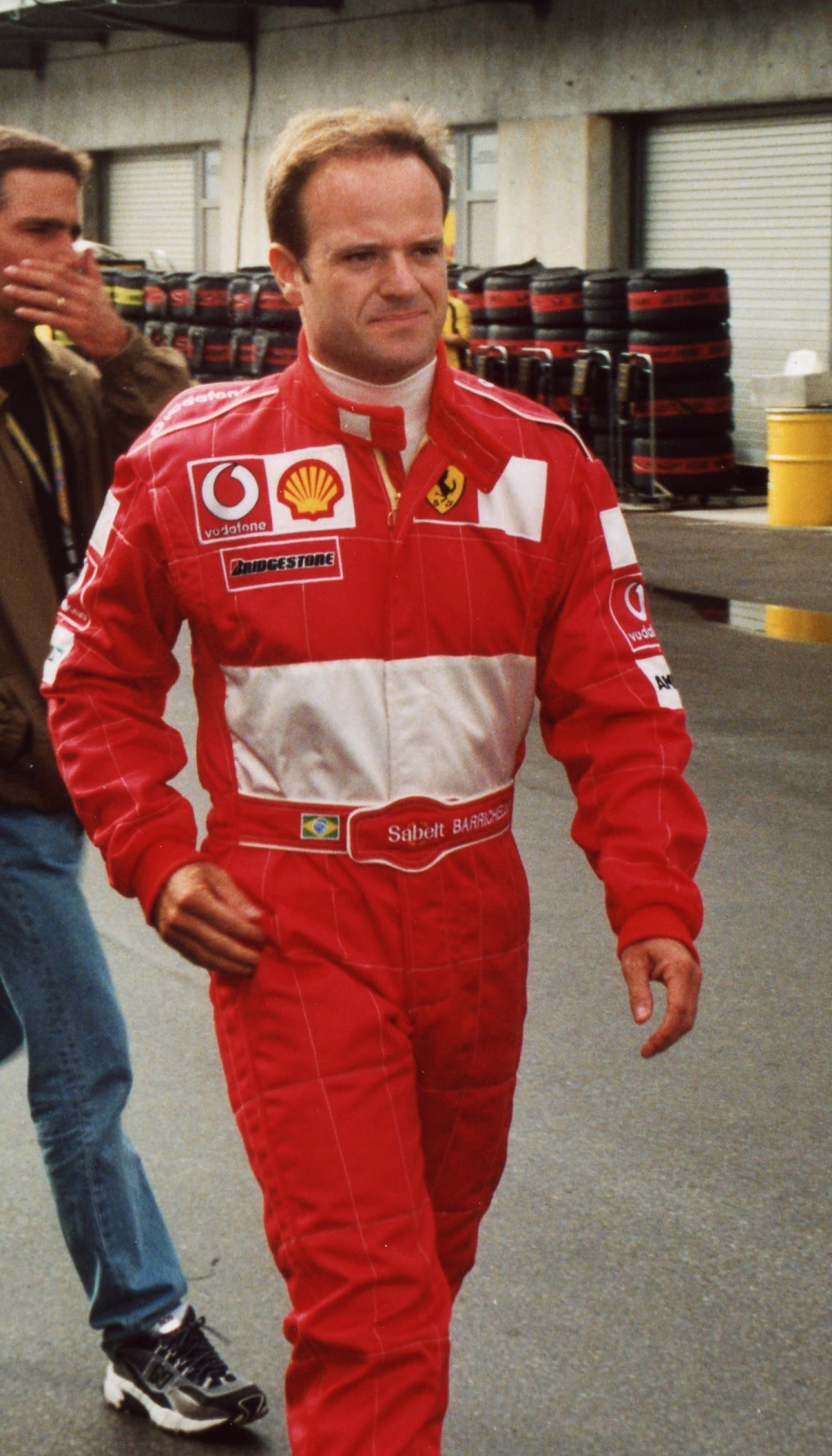
Barrichello after taking second place in qualifying, would go one better in the race

Two one-hour practices on Friday and two 45-minute sessions on Saturday preceded the race. Heavy rain fell on the IMS overnight, but it quickly subsided and ceased an hour before the first practice session began. When the tyre rubber was removed from the circuit, it became more abrasive than expected. The circuit was slightly moist in the first session with a puddle at turn nine but had dried fully (except the grass) by the second. Michael Schumacher lapped fastest almost halfway through the first session with a time of 1:15.188. Giancarlo Fisichella (Jordan), the Jaguar duo of De la Rosa and Eddie Irvine, Juan Pablo Montoya (Williams), Takuma Sato (Jordan), Heidfeld, Button and McLaren teammates Kimi Räikkönen and Coulthard completed the top ten.

Barrichello lost control of his Ferrari on the grass at the entry of the banked turn 13 owing to a loss of pressure in the left rear tyre after 29 minutes. He went up, causing moderate damage to his car's left side striking a concrete wall sideways around 100 ft (30 m) way from the SAFER barrier. The left-rear wheel and front wing were removed, while the left-front wheel was disconnected but held in place by wheel tethers. Barrichello sustained bruising but exited his car that was in the circuit's centre unaided. Officials stopped practice for 18 minutes, because marshals had to clear debris and remove his Ferrari from the centre of the circuit. He missed the rest of Friday's running because FIA rules prohibited him from driving the spare Ferrari. With ten minutes remaining, Ralf Schumacher spun into the turn eight outside tyre wall, partly dislodging the rear wing.

Lap times were faster in the second practice session because of the drying track, and several drivers made errors. Michael Schumacher set the day's fastest lap of 1:13.548 with 17 minutes remaining. Irvine was almost six-tenths of a second slower in second. The two McLarens of Coulthard and Räikkönen, BAR's Jacques Villeneuve, Frentzen, Fisichella, Renault's Jarno Trulli, Heidfeld and Ralf Schumacher made up positions three to ten. Six minutes into the session, Sato locked the wheels on the wet grass and spun off the track, colliding into the turn eight tyre barrier. Montoya stopped on track with a suspected engine problem and Button was asked to stop because Renault detected over two-way telemetry a possible oil gearbox issue.

The third practice session was held under thick fog and cool, cloudy weather. Michael Schumacher maintained his overall lead, with a lap time of 1:11.262 19 minutes into the session. He was almost half a second faster than teammate Barrichello in second. Coulthard, Montoya, Räikkönen, Ralf Schumacher, Irvine, Trulli and Toyota's Mika Salo followed in the top ten. Sato's engine failed while driving at low speed after one minute of the session, and he pulled off to the side of the track with smoke billowing from the back of his car, which later caught fire. Jordan switched the engine from its backup car to Sato's race car.

The fog that had descended on IMS had dissipated significantly before the sun broke through as teams completed their qualifying preparations during the final practice session. Michael Schumacher accomplished a sweep of being the quickest driver in every practice session with a lap of 1:11.158 set seven minutes before practice ended. His teammate Barrichello, Irvine, Ralf Schumacher, Coulthard, Heidfeld, Montoya, Räikkönen, Fisichella and Frentzen rounded out the top ten. Räikkönen spun his McLaren, breaking its front suspension hitting the tyre barrier between turns nine and ten just before practice ended. His race car was required during qualifying.

== Qualifying ==
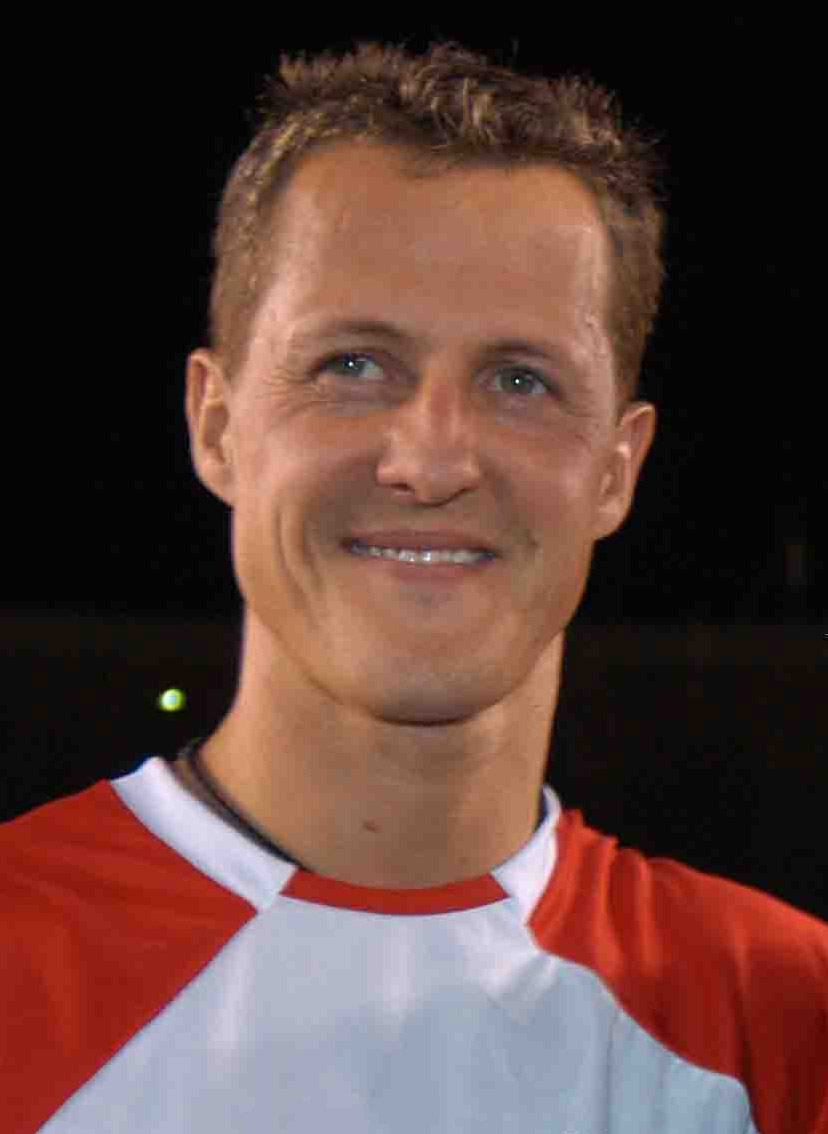
Michael Schumacher (pictured in 2005) took his sixth pole position of the season and the 49th of his career.

Each driver was allowed twelve laps during Saturday's one-hour qualifying session, with starting positions determined by the drivers' quickest laps. During this session, the 107% rule was in effect, requiring each driver to remain within 107% of the quickest lap time in order to qualify for the race. Qualifying was held in sunny and warm weather, and track conditions improved, resulting in a 20-minute wait for participants to drive on a good circuit. Michael Schumacher won his sixth pole position of the season and 49th of his career after setting a new track lap record of 1:10.790 on his second quick lap. He aborted his first quick lap after locking his tyres and going onto grass, and believed he could have gone faster had he not had to slow for yellow flags for Alex Yoong's abandoned Minardi car. Schumacher was joined on the front row by teammate Barrichello, who was nearly 0.3 seconds slower after struggling to get his Ferrari properly balanced and making a mistake at turn one on his first run. Coulthard took third from Montoya on his final lap, losing time being late accelerate out of turn 13. Williams teammates Montoya and Ralf Schumacher were fourth and fifth, respectively, owing to car balance issues. Montoya's two errors kept him from lapping faster, while Ralf Schumacher understeered. Räikkönen, sixth, drove the spare McLaren following his crash during practice but had to slow for yellow flags. BAR altered Villeneuve's car on each of his runs, and he took seventh. Trulli, eighth, worked with Renault's engineers to correct his car's balance. Fisichella, ninth, could not extract the maximum performance from his car. Heidfeld locked his brakes on his first run and spun after losing control of his car when braking on the second. He changed his chassis setup again for tenth.

Heidfeld's teammate Frentzen was the fastest driver who did not qualify in the top 10, finishing 11th after Sauber fixed most of the oversteering issues with his car. Panis, 12th, oversteered heavily on his first run, was blocked by Coulthard on his third run, and spun with five minutes left on his final run. Irvine abandoned his first quick lap after losing grip in a difficult-to-handle Jaguar braking for turn one. Further setup tweaks and a new set of tyres failed to improve his performance, leaving him 13th. Button, 14th, reported that his car's balance was inconsistent, yawning from understeer to oversteer near the end of the lap. Sato qualified 15th after being made to use a lower-specification Honda engine. Allan McNish, 16th, qualified higher than Toyota teammate Salo for the second time in 2002, having been affected by understeer. De la Rosa had the identical car setup as Irvine and qualified 17th because his Jaguar was loose under braking and steering. Minardi's Mark Webber recovered from a gearbox input shaft failure in the final practice session that required a gearbox and engine change to qualify 18th. On his final run, Salo in 19th had full loss of car grip and the wheel speed sensor failed. Yoong damaged his car's left side hitting the turn eight barrier after driving onto wet grass but returned to the circuit. He could not lap quicker in the spare Minardi car and finished 20th and last.

=== Qualifying classification ===
| Pos | No. | Driver | Constructor | Lap | Gap | Grid |
|---|---|---|---|---|---|---|
| 1 | 1 | (Germany) Michael Schumacher | Ferrari | 1:10.790 | — | 1 |
| 2 | 2 | (Brazil) Rubens Barrichello | Ferrari | 1:11.058 | +0.268 | 2 |
| 3 | 3 | (United Kingdom) David Coulthard | McLaren-Mercedes | 1:11.413 | +0.623 | 3 |
| 4 | 6 | (Colombia) Juan Pablo Montoya | Williams-BMW | 1:11.414 | +0.624 | 4 |
| 5 | 5 | (Germany) Ralf Schumacher | Williams-BMW | 1:11.587 | +0.797 | 5 |
| 6 | 4 | (Finland) Kimi Räikkönen | McLaren-Mercedes | 1:11.633 | +0.843 | 6 |
| 7 | 11 | (Canada) Jacques Villeneuve | BAR-Honda | 1:11.738 | +0.948 | 7 |
| 8 | 14 | (Italy) Jarno Trulli | Renault | 1:11.888 | +1.098 | 8 |
| 9 | 9 | (Italy) Giancarlo Fisichella | Jordan-Honda | 1:11.902 | +1.112 | 9 |
| 10 | 7 | (Germany) Nick Heidfeld | Sauber-Petronas | 1:11.953 | +1.163 | 10 |
| 11 | 8 | (Germany) Heinz-Harald Frentzen | Sauber-Petronas | 1:12.083 | +1.293 | 11 |
| 12 | 12 | (France) Olivier Panis | BAR-Honda | 1:12.161 | +1.371 | 12 |
| 13 | 16 | (United Kingdom) Eddie Irvine | Jaguar-Cosworth | 1:12.282 | +1.492 | 13 |
| 14 | 15 | (United Kingdom) Jenson Button | Renault | 1:12.401 | +1.611 | 14 |
| 15 | 10 | (Japan) Takuma Sato | Jordan-Honda | 1:12.647 | +1.857 | 15 |
| 16 | 25 | (United Kingdom) Allan McNish | Toyota | 1:12.723 | +1.933 | 16 |
| 17 | 17 | (Spain) Pedro de la Rosa | Jaguar-Cosworth | 1:12.739 | +1.949 | 17 |
| 18 | 23 | (Australia) Mark Webber | Minardi-Asiatech | 1:13.128 | +2.338 | 18 |
| 19 | 24 | (Finland) Mika Salo | Toyota | 1:13.213 | +2.423 | 19 |
| 20 | 22 | (Malaysia) Alex Yoong | Minardi-Asiatech | 1:13.809 | +3.019 | 20 |
107% time: 1:15.745

== Warm-up ==
A 30-minute warm-up session took place in sunny weather on the morning of the race. At the start of the session, participants did initial installation laps in their spare and race vehicles. Michael Schumacher lapped fastest at 1:13.183 seven minutes before warm-up ended. Barrichello, Panis, Sato, Räikkönen, Salo, Irvine, Coulthard, Button and Fisichella were in positions two through ten. Coulthard's race vehicle experienced a slight fuel leak, so he swapped to the spare McLaren setup for teammate Räikkönen during warm-up, and the mechanics altered the car to suit him. Button and Fisichella each stalled their engines attempting launch control starts at the pit lane exit.

== Race ==
The 73-lap, 306.016 km (190.150 mi) race began before an estimated 125,000 spectators at 13:00 local time. Before the race, the weather was sunny, with the air temperature at 26 °C (79 °F) and the track temperature at 34 to 35 °C (93 to 95 °F). The press expected that 120,000 to 150,000 people would attend, with most coming from the United States; the decreased turnout was attributed to factors such as both titles being won by Ferrari and the state of the global economy. Prior to the start, drivers starting on the outside grid places were dissatisfied since the racing line ensured the inside was cleaner. Michael Schumacher overshot his pole position grid spot, but he reversed back into position. When the red lights went out to begin the race, Michael Schumacher held his lead into the first corner. Behind him, Barrichello, wearing a corset under his racing overalls, held off Coulthard's challenge on the outside for second by moving towards him to prevent him from getting a run. Ralf Schumacher passed his slow-starting teammate Montoya for third place after a better start. Salo made the best start in the field, moving from 19th to 16th by the end of the first lap, while Panis lost five positions over the same distance.

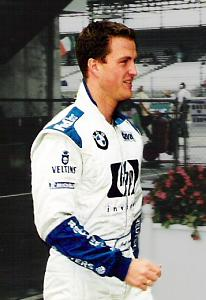
Ralf Schumacher was involved in a collision with his teammate Juan Pablo Montoya on the second lap in which the rear wing was removed from his Williams car.

At the end of the first lap, Michael Schumacher led his teammate Barrichello by 0.9 seconds, with Coulthard in third. At the beginning of lap two, Montoya was slipstreaming teammate Ralf Schumacher as they exited the banked turn 13 and drew alongside him on the main straight. On the outside, Montoya attempted to brake later than Ralf Schumacher, only for his teammate to lose control of his car's rear during braking after striking the inside kerb. Montoya entered turn one on an wider outside radius and was able to drive through at the same speed. As Montoya passed, Ralf Schumacher was on a tighter trajectory, locked his brakes and collided with his right rear wheel, sending both cars onto the grass and Montoya's car bounced. Because of the collision, Montoya fell to seventh place. Ralf's Schumacher rear wing was removed in the crash, requiring him to drive slowly and make an unplanned pit stop for mechanics to replace it. The stop took 69 seconds, and he rejoined the course one lap behind the race leaders. The crash elevated Trulli, Räikkönen, and Villeneuve to higher-paying positions.

Further back, Sato overtook Button for 11th and Salo passed Irvine for 16th. Both Ferraris began to pull away from all other cars. On lap four, Salo overtook his teammate McNish in the midfield for 13th. Sato slipstreamed past Frentzen's car into turn one for 10th place on lap seven, however he locked his front right wheel and went onto the grass, causing Frentzen to swerve to the left late in the manoevure to avoid a collision. Button used the situation to move into tenth and Sato almost collided with him and Frentzen upon rejoining the track. Sato overtook Frentzen on the inside at turn three on the same lap and began gaining on Button. Due to a spark plug failure, Räikkönen's V10 engine began misfiring, meaning he had nine cylinders available and was slower from lap 13. He lost fifth to Villeneuve at the start of the main straight on the next lap. Montoya closed and passed Räikkönen on the inside for sixth on the main straight into turn one on lap 17. Irvine overtook Webber for 16th two laps later.

Because they were driving lighter cars, the two Ferrari drivers began trading new race lap records as they lapped slower cars. On lap 22, Panis was the first racer to make a scheduled pit stop, exiting after 8.4 seconds. While Barrichello lost almost a second to teammate Michael Schumacher while lapping Irvine and McNish, Villeneuve was the first of the leading drivers to make a pit stop four laps later. He rejoined the track in 11th after a 9.4-second stop. The Ferrari and Michelin-shod teams were employing different pit stop strategies – Ferrari were planning to make two pit stops while Michelin-shod teams planned for one, possibly because they wanted to stop their tyres from failing. At the end of lap 27, Michael Schumacher made the first of two pit stops from the lead, remaining stationary for eight seconds before exiting the pit lane in second, ahead of Coulthard. Barrichello was promoted to the lead, setting the race's fastest lap of 1:12.754 on lap 27 before his pit stop at the end of the next lap. His first pit stop similarly took eight seconds, and he rejoined in second, behind teammate Michael Schumacher.

On lap 29, De la Rosa became the race's first retirement when he was stuck in fifth gear. When his Jaguar caught fire, smoke billowed from the rear, and he pulled over to the pit lane entry to get out. The marshals instructed De la Rosa to jump over the Armco barrier, but he plunged 6 ft (1.8 m) into a river that flows beneath the circuit at that point, which the marshals did not tell him was there. Trulli made his first and only pit stop from fourth on the same lap and fell to seventh. Montoya misread a pit board message and made his only pit stop ten laps too early on the 33rd lap. His pit crew scrambled to his pit box and the mix-up meant he was stationary for 11.2 seconds and dropped to sixth, running a heavier fuel load than required at that moment in time. The delay in servicing the car and the damage to their one-stop strategy meant Montoya was racing for fourth place from that point. Irvine overtook McNish for tenth at turn one on lap 33. Villeneuve battled Trulli on the main straight and passed him for seventh into turn one on the next lap.

The yet-to-stop Coulthard remained close behind Barrichello as the two Ferraris scythed their way through slower traffic. Fisichella made his first and only pit stop from fifth on lap 37. This promoted Montoya to fifth and Villeneuve to sixth as Fisichella rejoined the circuit in ninth. On lap 41, the one-stopping Webber entered the Minardi garage to retire with a failed power steering system. Coulthard made his only pit stop from third at the conclusion of lap 42. His stop took 10.8 seconds to complete, and he rejoined the track in fourth, behind his teammate Räikkönen but ahead of Montoya. Räikkönen's pit stop followed two laps later and fell to sixth, returning his teammate Coulthard to third, Montoya to fourth and Villeneuve to fifth. Yoong exited the course and entered the turn one run-off area, his engine blowing white smoke, due to an oil pump failure when he was in front of Barrichello on lap 49. The engine failure left oil on the racing surface.

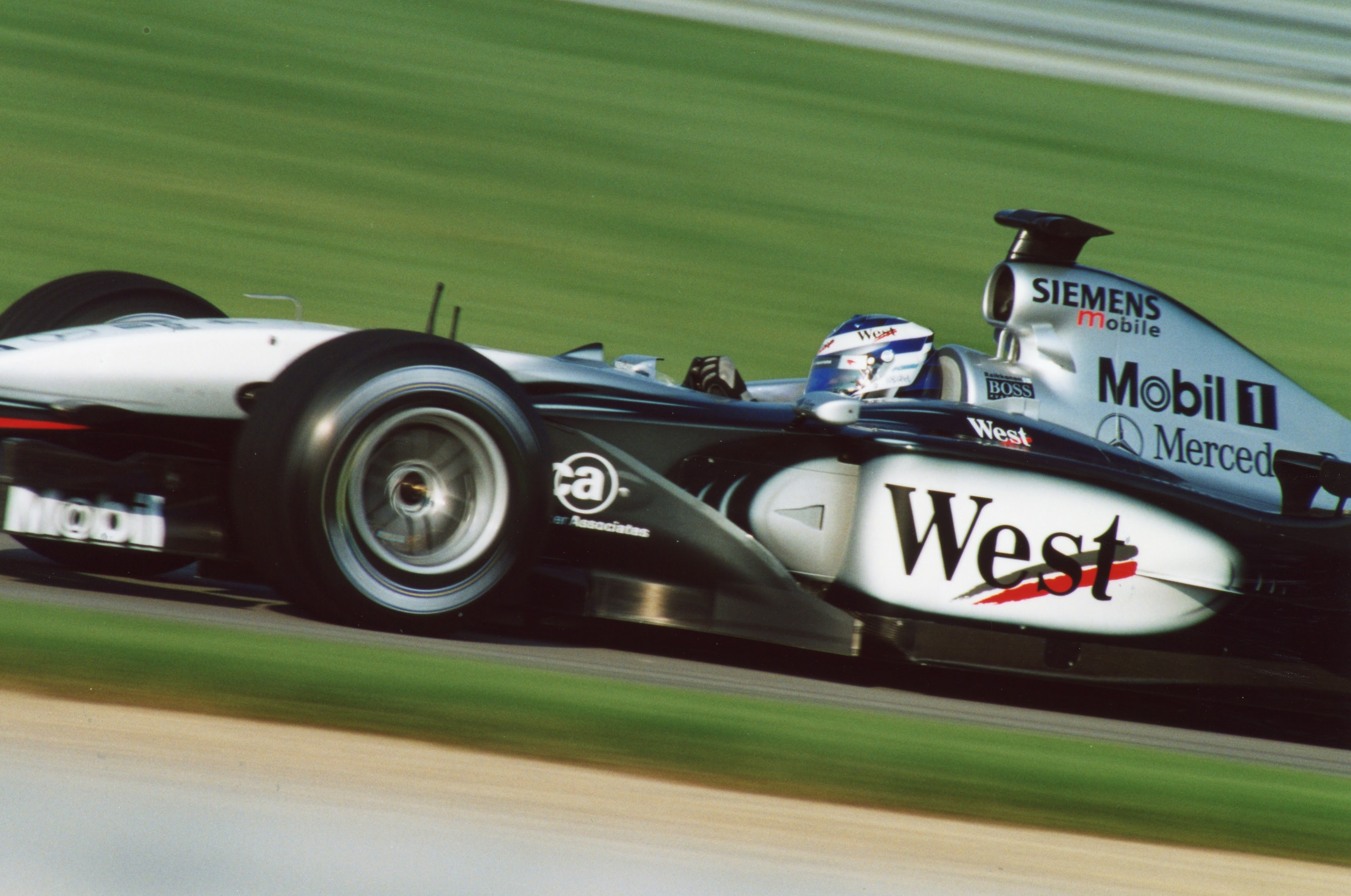
Räikkönen retired due to engine failure with only 22 laps remaining

At the end of lap 49, Michael Schumacher took his second pit stop from the lead, giving Barrichello one lap to try to gain an advantage. His 7.8-second stop saw him resume the track in second, ahead of Coulthard. Barrichello led the following lap until he entered the pit lane for his final stop and returned to the race in second. Frentzen slid off the track and into the turn four gravel trap on lap 51, but he kept driving by making his way back onto the track. Räikkönen became the Grand Prix's final retirement on the following lap when he abandoned his McLaren at the side of the middle of the back straight, smoke billowing from its rear. Villeneuve made his second stop from fifth on the same lap and fell to sixth. McLaren altered Coulthard's engine plan, and he drove cautiously for the final 20 laps to protect it.

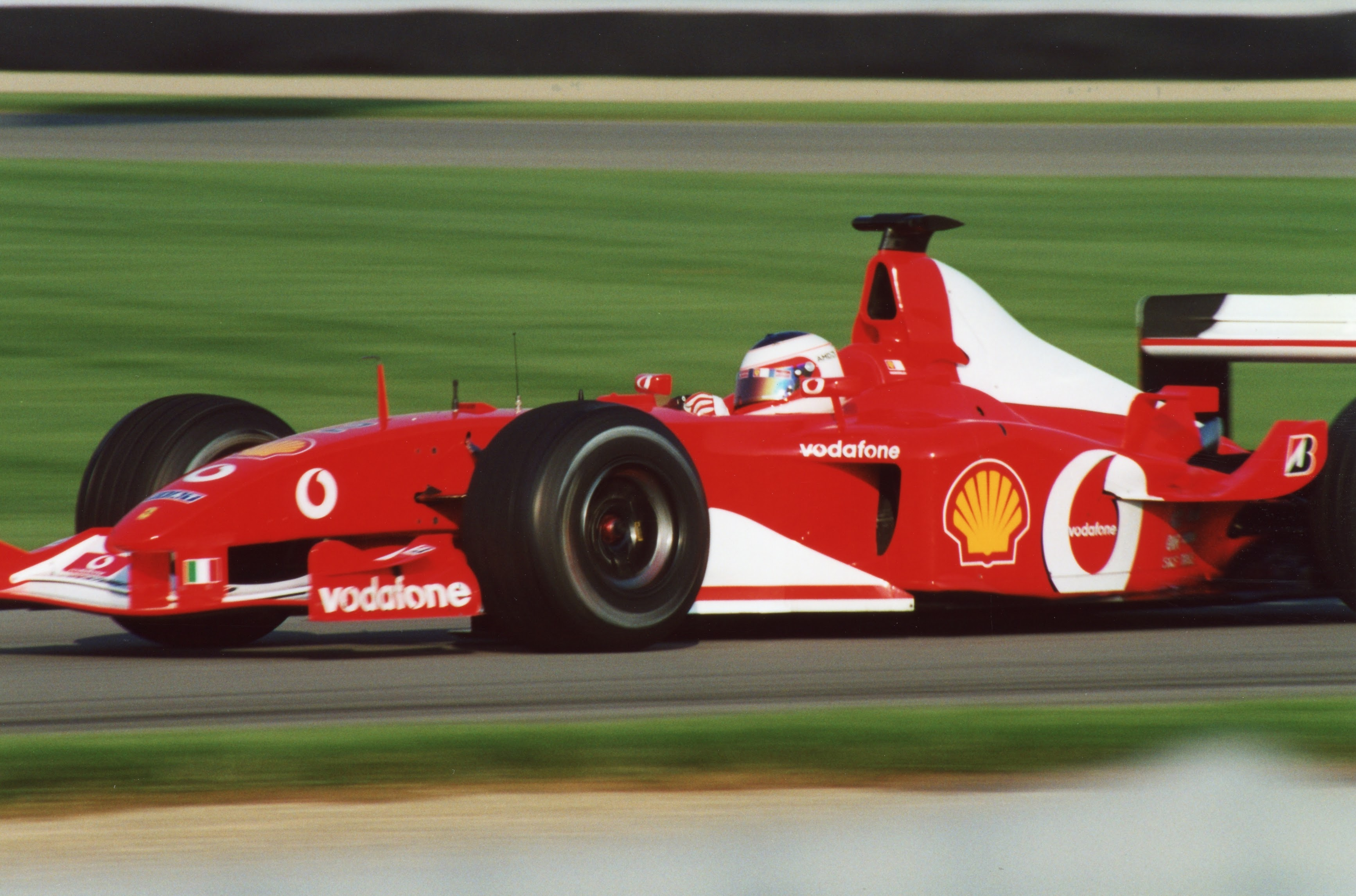
Rubens Barrichello won the race in one of the closest finishes in Formula One history

Michael Schumacher opened up a 3.4 second lead over his teammate Barrichello by the 64th lap, as Coulthard began steadily closing up to both drivers who had both reduced their pace. Montoya then gained on Coulthard, who replied by quickening his pace to counteract his faster pace. By the start of the last lap, Michael Schumacher was a half-second ahead of Barrichello, having slowed significantly from lap 69 to allow his teammate to catch up. Michael Schumacher decided to slow in the final two corners to allow Barrichello to close in further despite being instructed otherwise, and drove left up off the racing line at the banking turn 13 to give his teammate room and let him run alongside to the finish line at reduced speed. Barrichello, who was initially hesitant about being alongside his teammate, passed Michael Schumacher and won by 0.011 seconds, his fourth win of the season and the fifth of his career. The 0.011-second margin of victory was the second-closest in Formula One history after Peter Gethin won the 1971 Italian Grand Prix by 0.01 seconds over Ronnie Peterson.

Coulthard finished third, Montoya fourth, the same place he started in, Trulli fifth, and Villeneuve sixth in the last points-paying position. Fisichella was seventh, having inconsistent tyres that made his car loose. Button in eighth was fast on the main straight but slow in the infield due to his wing settings. Heidfeld (who had more frontal understeer before his second pit stop making his car difficult to drive) and Irvine completed the top ten. Sato, in 11th place, had blistered tyres and a loose car. Panis finished 12th, owing to mechanical problems in the second half of the race. Frentzen finished 13th owing to oversteer, which overheated his rear tyres, and his helmet, which blocked part of the engine's air inlet, limiting its power slightly due to his height. He was ahead of Salo in 14th, who had hydraulic pressure issues but had an engine misfire repaired by bi-directional telemetry. McNish finished 15th despite having car balance and handling issues owing to his steering locking up while turning right. Ralf Schumacher was the final classified finisher.

=== Post-race ===
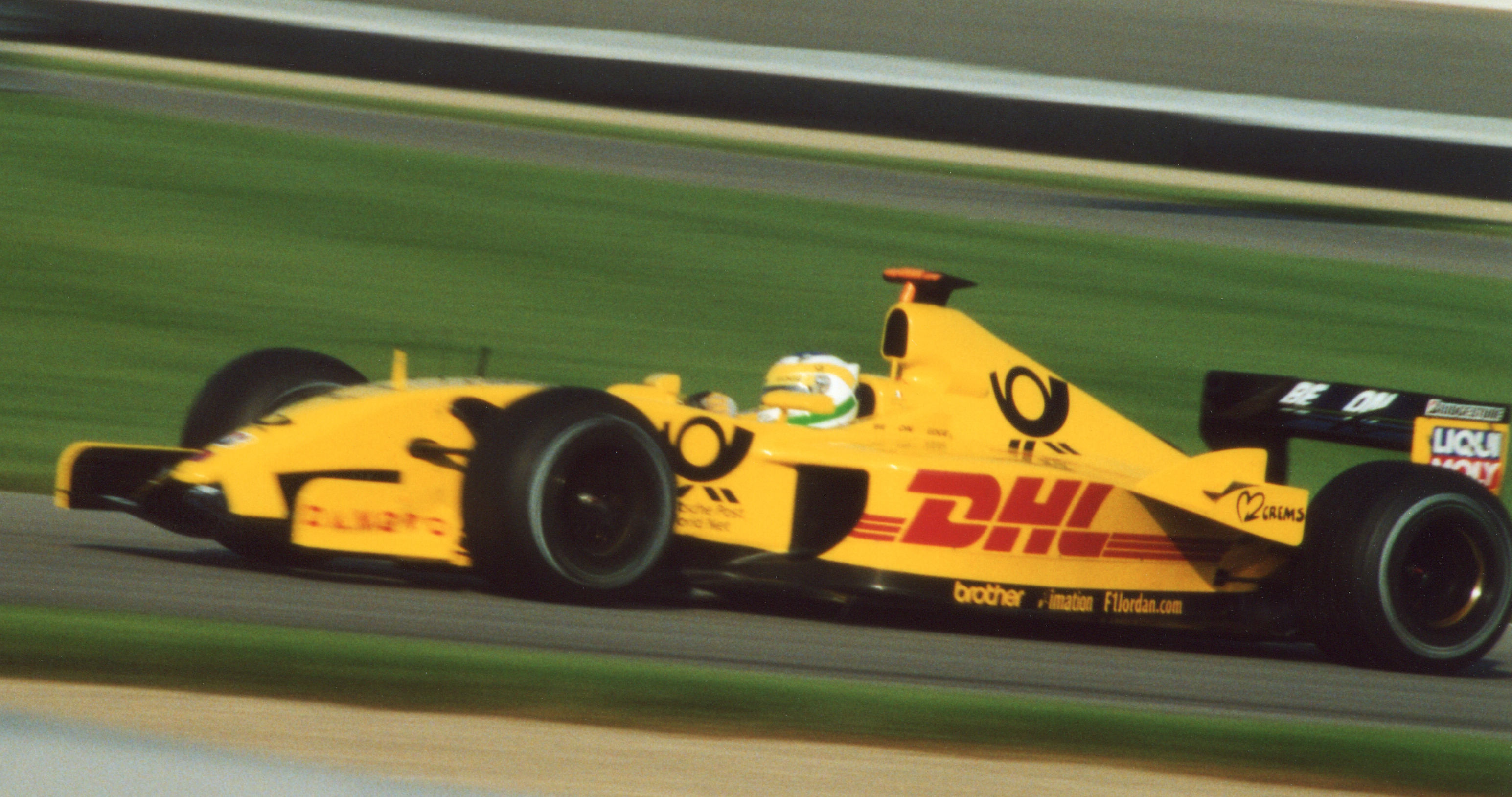
Fisichella finished seventh in his Jordan

Barrichello did not realise he had won the race until his crew told him over the radio late on the cool-down lap. The top three drivers appeared on the podium to collect their trophies and spoke to the media in the subsequent press conference. Barrichello called the win "very special" and said, "To win, it was very, very, very good... I got to the last corner, I didn't know what to do and nothing has been said. Michael was just very kind to, you know, let us finish equally. I guess I pointed a little bit in front, but, you know, what can we say?" Michael Schumacher, who was reportedly angry over finishing second, praised his team's strategy and his car, "I think the strategy we used, two stops in the end was supposed to be by about ten seconds faster. But would we have been stuck behind, then our strategy could have been a problem. So, all in all, we did the right thing at the right time." Coulthard explained that being stuck behind slower cars was his attempt to not lose too much time and stay in third place, and he expressed astonishment at his quick start despite the heavy fuel load.

It was widely assumed that Michael Schumacher's slowing on the penultimate lap was his way of repaying Barrichello for being ordered to allow him to pass and win the Austrian Grand Prix earlier in the season, a hypothesis Ferrari rejected. Michael Schumacher stated Barrichello deserved to win but denied it was pre-planned, "We have always supported each other. I thought today was a great opportunity to finish equal, to go together over the line, but we failed." He was indecisive on saying whether he was trying to give Barrichello the victory or organise a dead heat finish. Barrichello claimed he entered the final corner unsure what to do, "Nothing was said. Michael was very kind to let us finish equally. I guess I just pointed a little bit in front." He later claimed that, like others, he was unsure whether he had won the race.

Team principals agreed that Ferrari made an error. Jordan team owner Eddie Jordan compared the staged finish to the end of golf's Ryder Cup, which Europe won, and argued that dead heats were impossible given modern technology's accuracy. BAR head David Richards described it as Ferrari "covering up for a complete cock-up" and called it "showmanship". Ferrari team principal Jean Todt reiterated their view that team orders were not enforced, "I think it would be very presumptuous and not humble at all to say that we are controlling everything." Formula One supremo Bernie Ecclestone believed Michael Schumacher should have admitted his error in the post-race press conference. IMS president Tony George hoped that the finish would increase interest in Formula One in the United States as it got people talking about the Grand Prix.

Williams technical director Patrick Head did not assign blame for the second-lap collision between his team's drivers, but he heavily criticised them. Montoya said that his teammate Ralf Schumacher made an error that forced him off the track. Ralf Schumacher argued there was a lack of space for Montoya to pass him on the outside and said he would watch television coverage to get another perspective of the crash. Ralf Schumacher's driving, in which he unlapped himself during Irvine's late-race duel with Heidfeld, was criticised by Irvine. Trulli was delighted to finish fifth and praised his strategy, "Very happy. Good race, good start and good result in the end, thanks to the car's reliability". Villeneuve said he had "a good race" despite scoring one championship point for finishing sixth, "The team did a great job. It was a good weekend. We were competitive. That's what matters."

Michael Schumacher maintained his lead in the World Drivers' Championship with 134 championship points. Barrichello's victory gave him second place in the standings with 71 championship points. Montoya maintained third place and extended his gap over teammate Ralf Schumacher in fourth place by three championship points, while Coulthard cut the gap to four championship points in fifth. In the World Constructors' Championship, Ferrari with 205 championship points broke McLaren's 1988 record for the most constructors' points scored in a season and extended their advantage over Williams, who secured second in the championship. McLaren remained in third while Renault and Sauber continued to battle for fourth with one round remaining in the season.

=== Race classification ===
Drivers who scored championship points are denoted in bold.

| Pos | No. | Driver | Constructor | Tyre | Laps | Time/Retired | Grid | Points |
|---|---|---|---|---|---|---|---|---|
| 1 | 2 | (Brazil) **Rubens Barrichello** | **Ferrari** | B | 73 | 1:31:07.934 | 2 | 10 |
| 2 | 1 | (Germany) **Michael Schumacher** | **Ferrari** | B | 73 | + 0.011 | 1 | 6 |
| 3 | 3 | (United Kingdom) **David Coulthard** | **McLaren-Mercedes** | M | 73 | + 7.799 | 3 | 4 |
| 4 | 6 | (Colombia) **Juan Pablo Montoya** | **Williams-BMW** | M | 73 | + 9.911 | 4 | 3 |
| 5 | 14 | (Italy) **Jarno Trulli** | **Renault** | M | 73 | + 56.847 | 8 | 2 |
| 6 | 11 | (Canada) **Jacques Villeneuve** | **BAR-Honda** | B | 73 | + 58.211 | 7 | 1 |
| 7 | 9 | (Italy) Giancarlo Fisichella | Jordan-Honda | B | 72 | +1 lap | 9 | |
| 8 | 15 | (United Kingdom) Jenson Button | Renault | M | 72 | +1 lap | 14 | |
| 9 | 7 | (Germany) Nick Heidfeld | Sauber-Petronas | B | 72 | +1 lap | 10 | |
| 10 | 16 | (United Kingdom) Eddie Irvine | Jaguar-Cosworth | M | 72 | +1 lap | 13 | |
| 11 | 10 | (Japan) Takuma Sato | Jordan-Honda | B | 72 | +1 lap | 15 | |
| 12 | 12 | (France) Olivier Panis | BAR-Honda | B | 72 | +1 lap | 12 | |
| 13 | 8 | (Germany) Heinz-Harald Frentzen | Sauber-Petronas | B | 71 | +2 laps | 11 | |
| 14 | 24 | (Finland) Mika Salo | Toyota | M | 71 | +2 laps | 19 | |
| 15 | 25 | (United Kingdom) Allan McNish | Toyota | M | 71 | +2 laps | 16 | |
| 16 | 5 | (Germany) Ralf Schumacher | Williams-BMW | M | 71 | +2 laps | 5 | |
| Ret | 4 | (Finland) Kimi Räikkönen | McLaren-Mercedes | M | 50 | Engine | 6 | |
| Ret | 22 | (Malaysia) Alex Yoong | Minardi-Asiatech | M | 46 | Engine | 20 | |
| Ret | 23 | (Australia) Mark Webber | Minardi-Asiatech | M | 38 | Steering | 18 | |
| Ret | 17 | (Spain) Pedro de la Rosa | Jaguar-Cosworth | M | 27 | Transmission | 17 | |

== Championship standings after the race ==
Drivers' Championship standings

| +/– | Pos | Driver | Points |
|---|---|---|---|
| | 1 | (Germany) Michael Schumacher* | 134 |
| | 2 | (Brazil) Rubens Barrichello | 71 |
| | 3 | (Colombia) Juan Pablo Montoya | 47 |
| | 4 | (Germany) Ralf Schumacher | 42 |
| | 5 | (United Kingdom) David Coulthard | 41 |

Constructors' Championship standings

| +/– | Pos | Constructor | Points |
|---|---|---|---|
| | 1 | (Italy) Ferrari* | 205 |
| | 2 | (United Kingdom) Williams-BMW | 89 |
| | 3 | (United Kingdom) McLaren-Mercedes | 61 |
| | 4 | (France) Renault | 22 |
| | 5 | (Switzerland) Sauber-Petronas | 11 |
Sources:

- Note: Only the top five positions are included for both sets of standings.
- Bold text and an asterisk indicates the 2002 World Champions.

| Previous race: 2002 Italian Grand Prix | FIA Formula One World Championship; 2002 season | Next race: 2002 Japanese Grand Prix |
| Previous race: 2001 United States Grand Prix | United States Grand Prix | Next race: 2003 United States Grand Prix |
