= Air-operated valve =

Type of power operated valve

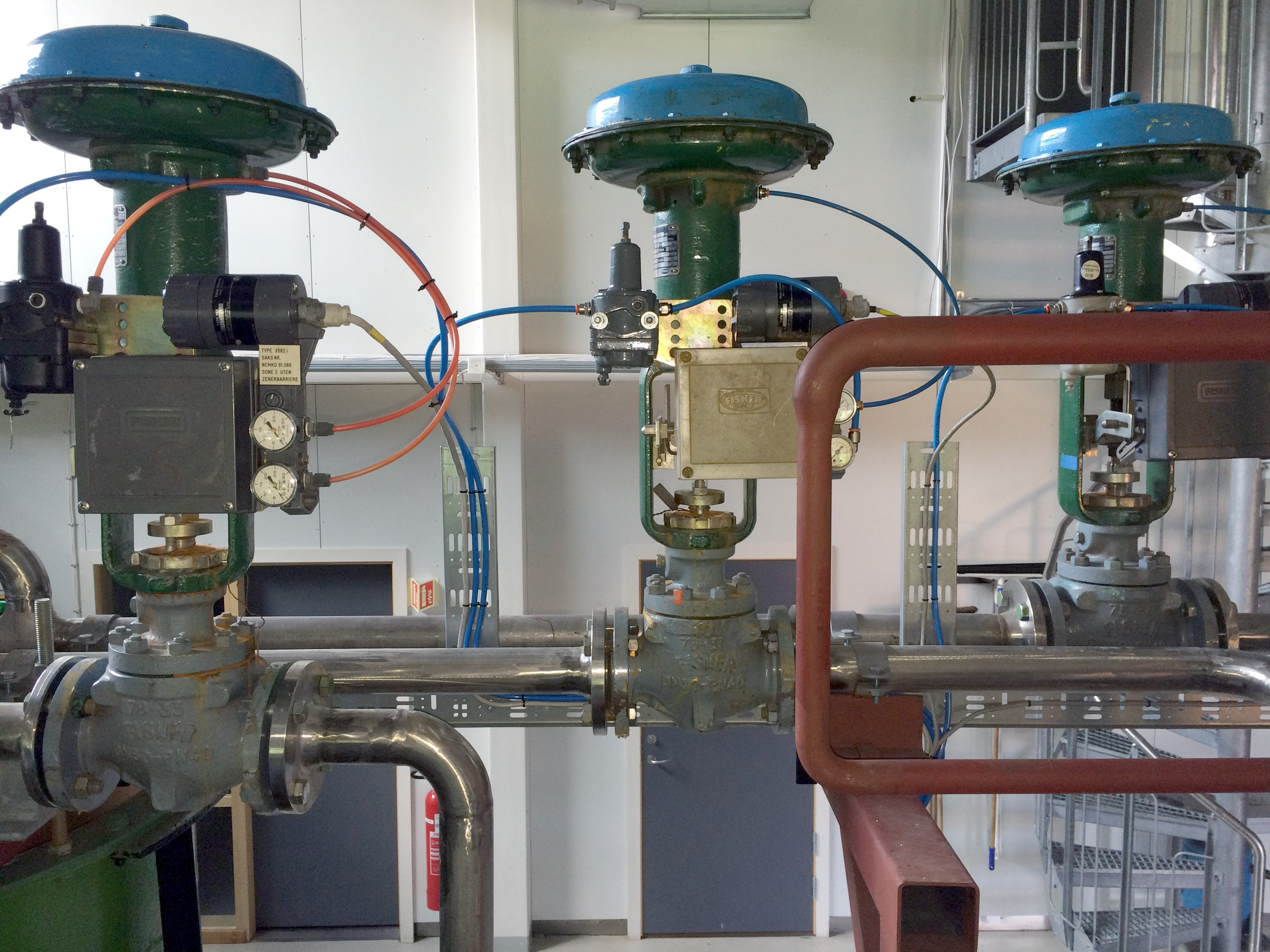
Modulating control valves each with 4-20mA I to P converter linked to pneumatic a valve positioner controlling a diaphragm actuator

An air-operated valve, also known as a pneumatic valve, is a type of power-operated pipe valve that uses air pressure to perform a function similar to a solenoid. As air pressure is increased, the compressed air starts to push against the piston or diaphragm walls which causes the valve to actuate. Whether the valve opens or closes depends on the application. These valves are used for many functions in pneumatic systems, but most often serve one of two functions. The first activates a part of the system when a specific pressure is reached. The second prevents damage by maintaining a constant pressure or flow rate inside a system, or releasing pressure when it reaches excessive levels.

== Types ==
Air-operated valves may be 2-way, 3-way and 4-way.

2-way valves can be either normally closed or normally opened. These valves have two ports that help the valves regulate the flow of air into a system. These valves often provide a simple on-off function.

3-way valves can be normally closed, normally open, and offer a universal function where gas can be diverted through a third opening to move the valve into the normally closed or normally open position. 3-way valves pressurize and exhaust one outlet port to control a single-acting cylinder or pilot another valve. Three-way valves may be used in pairs to operate a double-acting cylinder, thus replacing a four-way valve. A primary function of the 3-way valve is to save/store air that's compressed in high cyclic applications.

4-way valves are used for systems that require higher air pressure. Four-way valves are the most commonly used components for directional control in a pneumatic system. The 4-way valve can have four or five ports, with different positions and uses. Their most common function is to regulate the motion of a cylinder, motor, or other powering components.

== Applications ==
Pneumatic systems support production lines, mechanical clamps, train doors, and many other parts of industrial businesses.

== See also ==
The difference between an air-operated valve/pneumatic valve and a solenoid valve is the element in use. Air-operated valves use air, while solenoid valves use electricity.

- Control valve
- Solenoid valve
