= Biff =

Biff or BIFF may refer to:

== People ==
- Biff (name), a given name or nickname
- Biff (cartoon), British cartoon strip

== Computer-related terms ==
- biff (Unix), a UNIX mail notification program.
- BIFF, also B1FF or B1ff, a pseudonym used on Usenet and Internet
- BIFF, the Binary Interchange File Format, used by Microsoft Excel

== Film festivals ==
- Bakersfield Independent Film Festival
- Bahamas International Film Festival
- Beijing International Film Festival
- Beloit International Film Festival
- Bergen International Film Festival
- Berkshire International Film Festival
- Berlin International Film Festival
- Bogota International Film Festival
- Boston International Film Festival
- Boulder International Film Festival
- Brisbane International Film Festival
- Brooklyn International Film Festival, former name of the Brooklyn Film Festival
- Brussels International Film Festival (disambiguation), various film festivals in Brussels
- Buffalo International Film Festival
- Busan International Film Festival, previously "Pusan International Film Festival"

== Other uses ==
- The Bristol F.2 Fighter of World War I
- Bangsamoro Islamic Freedom Fighters an Islamic militant group based in the Southern Philippines
- WBFH, also known as The Biff, a community radio station in Bloomfield Hills, Michigan

== See also ==
- Biff Burger, an American fast food franchise
- Elysian Fields, Texas, once known as Biff Springs
- BIF (disambiguation)
- BIFFF
