= Michigan Wolverines =

Intercollegiate sports teams of the University of Michigan

- University: University of Michigan
- Nickname: Wolverines
- NCAA: Division I (FBS)
- Conference: Big Ten (primary); CWPA (women's water polo)
- Athletic director: Warde Manuel
- Location: Ann Arbor, Michigan
- Varsity teams: 29 (14 men's and 15 women's)
- Football stadium: Michigan Stadium
- Basketball arena: Crisler Center
- Ice hockey arena: Yost Ice Arena
- Baseball stadium: Ray Fisher Stadium
- Softball stadium: Alumni Field at The Wilpon Complex
- Soccer stadium: U-M Soccer Stadium
- Lacrosse stadium: U-M Lacrosse Stadium
- Other venues: Cliff Keen Arena; Varsity Tennis Center; Phyllis Ocker Field; U-M Golf Course; U-M Indoor Track Building; U-M Track and Field Stadium; Donald B. Canham Natatorium
- Colors: Maize and blue
- Mascot: Biff (previous)
- Fight song: The Victors
- Cheer: "Let's Go Blue!"
- Website: mgoblue.com
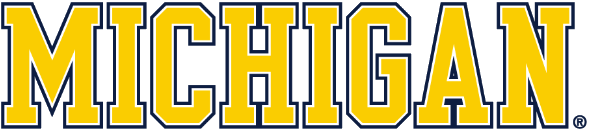

Big Ten logo in Michigan's colors

The Michigan Wolverines comprise 27 varsity sports teams at the University of Michigan, including 13 men's teams and 14 women's teams. Teams compete in the NCAA Division I as a member of the Big Ten Conference, with the exception of women's water polo. The program colors are maize and blue, and the winged helmet is a recognized icon of Michigan athletics.

Michigan has finished in the top-five of the NACDA Directors' Cup standings 15 times, which charts institutions' overall success across all college sports, and have finished in the top-ten 24 times since first awarded in 1994 (through 2026).

== Sports sponsored ==
Men's sports	Women's sports
Baseball	Basketball
Basketball	Cross country
Cross country	Field hockey
Football	Golf
Golf	Gymnastics
Gymnastics	Lacrosse
Ice hockey	Rowing
Lacrosse	Soccer
Soccer	Softball
Swimming & diving	Swimming & diving
Tennis	Tennis
Track and field^{†}	Track and field^{†}
Wrestling	Volleyball
	Water polo
† – Track and field includes both indoor and outdoor.

The University of Michigan Athletic Department sponsors teams in 13 men's and 14 women's NCAA sanctioned sports.

=== Baseball ===
The men's baseball team won national championships in 1953 and 1962 and has sent 138 players to the major leagues. The current coach of the Michigan Wolverines is Erik Bakich, who came to the University of Michigan after the 2012 season when Rich Maloney stepped down. Michigan has won 35 conference championships, made 25 NCAA Tournament appearances and won those 2 national titles. For 13 seasons from 1990 to 2002, Michigan won a lone Big Ten title in 1997 and made just one NCAA appearance in 1999. In 2015, Coach Bakich led the program to its first NCAA tournament berth since 2008 after needing to win the Big Ten tournament to qualify. In 2019, the Michigan Wolverines baseball team made it to the College World Series in Omaha, Nebraska, its first trip to the College World Series since 1984.

=== Basketball ===
==== Men's basketball ====
Honored basketball jerseys
Number	Player	Years
3	Trey Burke	2011–2013
22	Bill Buntin	1963–1965
33	Cazzie Russell	1964–1966
35	Phil Hubbard	1975–1979
41	Glen Rice	1986–1989
45	Rudy Tomjanovich	1967–1970

The men's basketball team plays its games at Crisler Center. The Wolverines have won 16 Big Ten regular season titles, as well as the inaugural Big Ten tournament in 1998, which it later forfeited due to NCAA violations. The team has appeared in the NCAA Final Four on nine occasions (1964, 1965, 1976, 1989, 1992, 1993, 2013, 2018, 2026) and won the National Championship in 1989 under Steve Fisher, and again in 2026 under Dusty May. The program later vacated its 1992 and 1993 Final Four appearances due to NCAA violations. Other notable players who played for Michigan include Roy Tarpley, Loy Vaught, Gary Grant, Terry Mills, Glen Rice, Jalen Rose, Rumeal Robinson, Rickey Green, Phil Hubbard, Jamal Crawford, Juwan Howard, Chris Webber, Jimmy King, Ray Jackson, Cazzie Russell, Daniel Horton, Campy Russell, and Mark Hughes.

During the 1990s, the program became involved in a scandal involving payments from a booster named Ed Martin to four players: Chris Webber, Maurice Taylor, Robert Traylor, and Louis Bullock. The scandal ultimately resulted in four years' probation and a self-imposed ban from postseason play in the 2002–03 season. UM also voluntarily vacated regular season wins and NCAA tournament games from selected past seasons. Vacating the results of 113 games won while the four players were eligible, including the 1992 and 1993 Final Fours, the entire 1992–93 season, and all seasons from fall 1995 through spring 1999. After the scandal, Michigan men's basketball would then go 10 years without making the NCAA tournament from 1999 to 2008. They would eventually end the drought in 2009 under then-head coach John Beilein. In 2013, the program would reach its first Final Four in 20 years before falling to Louisville in the national championship, 82–76. The program reached another Final Four in 2018, its second under Beilein. The team would once again reach the championship game, but instead fall to the Villanova Wildcats men's basketball. Beilein would accept a position as the Cleveland Cavaliers head coach after 12 years at Michigan. His replacement for the following season would be alumnus Juwan Howard.

==== Women's basketball ====
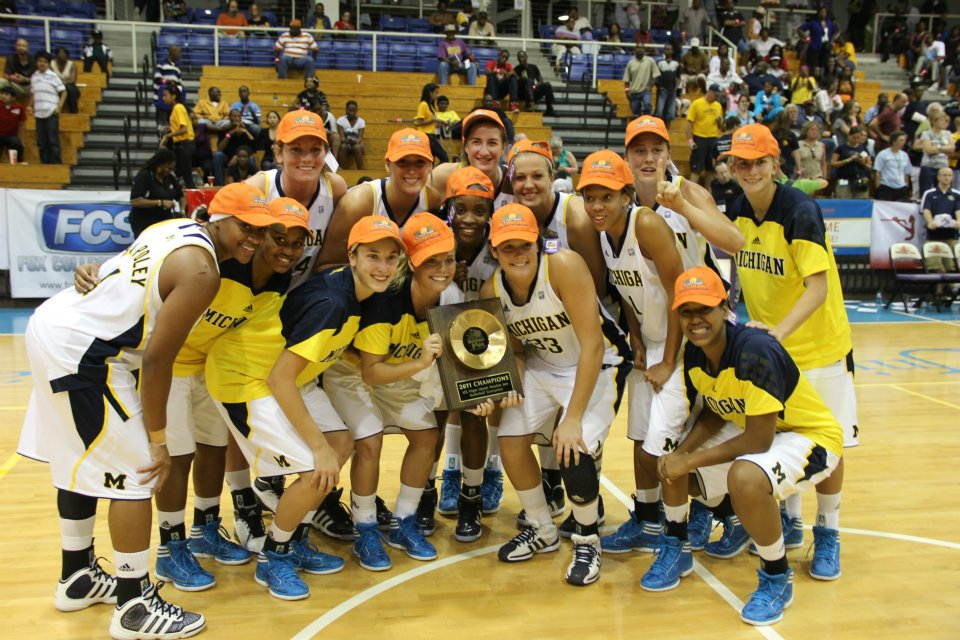
Michigan team with championship trophy at the 2011 Paradise Jam tournament

Michigan traveled to St. Thomas for the Paradise Jam tournament over Thanksgiving weekend in 2011. They took on Prairie View A&M in their first game on Thanksgiving Day, and won 59–53. In their second game, they faced Washington State and won easily, 69–39. On the final day of the tournament, they played Marquette, and won 71–51, to win the 2011 Paradise Jam (Reef Division) Championship. Jenny Ryan had a double-double, with 13 points and ten rebounds, to help Michigan to a 7–0 record on the year.

The women's basketball team is coached by Kim Barnes Arico, who became the head coach in 2012. Formerly the head coach of the St. John's Red Storm, Arico was named the Big East Conference Coach of the Year for 2012.

=== Cross country ===
The men's and women's cross country teams have been nationally renowned since 1974 when Ron Warhurst started coaching the men, and more recently as alum Mike McGuire took on the women's team in 1991. The women's team has qualified for the NCAA championships every year but two since 1988, finishing 2nd in 1994, and winning five consecutive Big Ten titles from 2002 to 2006. The men's team has qualified for the NCAA 24 times in the last 34 years, with a highest finish of 4th. Michigan men have won seven Big Ten titles in that period.

=== Football ===
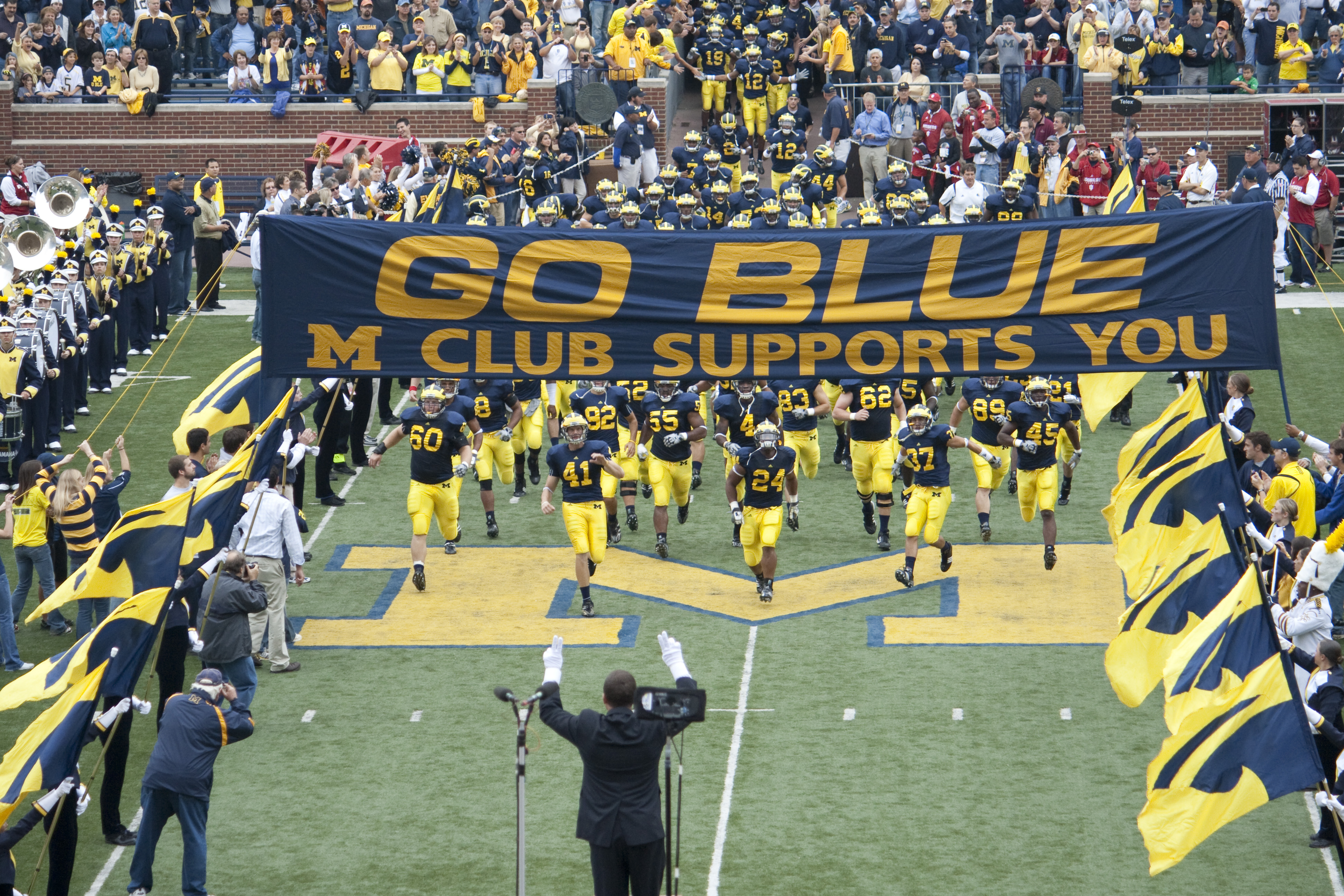
Michigan Marching Band salutes the 2009 Michigan Wolverines football team as it enters the field at Michigan Stadium.

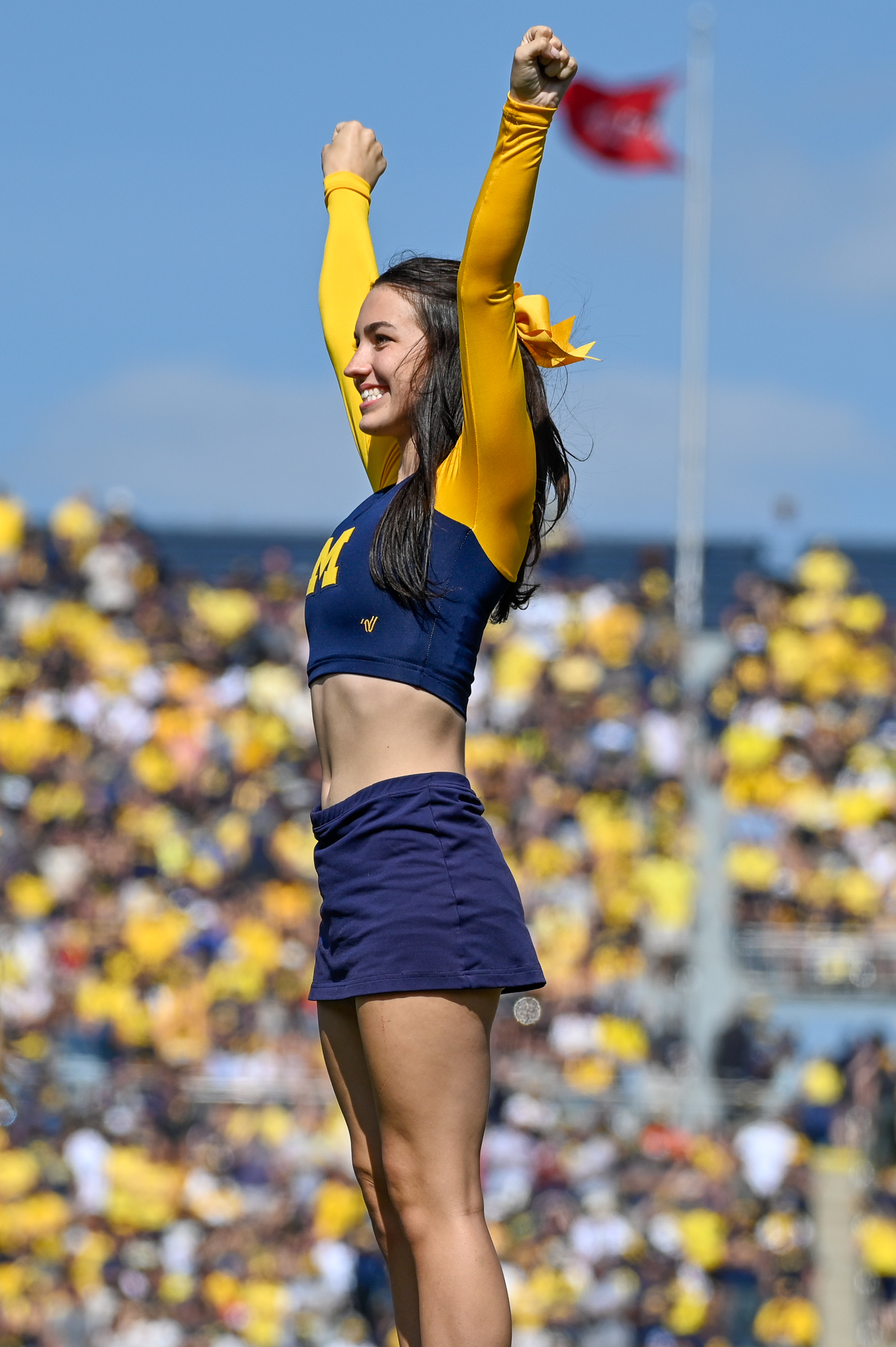
Cheering on the crowd on game day

The Wolverines have won a record 1,016 games, have the most all-time wins, and the second-highest winning percentage in college football history. Michigan won the inaugural Rose Bowl in 1902, the first college bowl game ever played. The Wolverine football program has claimed 12 national titles.

Michigan's 12 national championships have come under the direction of six coaches. The first six were garnered by the team's first coaching superstar, Fielding H. Yost. Yost directed his "Point-a-Minute" teams to four consecutive national titles from 1901 to 1904, amassing a record of 41–0–1. Yost also led Michigan to national titles in 1918 and 1923. Yost was instrumental in the creation of Michigan Stadium and designed it to permit its expansion to expand to a capacity of over 150,000. Yost's legacy also lives on with Yost Ice Arena, where Michigan's men's ice hockey team plays their home games. Michigan football has won six more national titles since Yost permanently retired in 1926. The Wolverines won back-to-back titles under Harry Kipke in 1932 and 1933 and two more consecutive championships under Fritz Crisler and Bennie Oosterbaan in 1947 and 1948. Michigan then won a national title under Lloyd Carr in 1997. Michigan won its most recent national title under Jim Harbaugh in 2023.

Michigan's famous football coaches include: Yost, who came to Michigan from Stanford University in 1901, Fritz Crisler, who guided Michigan to a pair of Big Ten Conference championships and the 1947 national title, has his name carried by the home of Michigan men's basketball team, Bo Schembechler won 13 Big Ten titles in his 21 seasons as head coach between 1969 and 1989, the first in 1969 when he beat his friend and mentor Woody Hayes, beginning of "The Ten Year War" era of the Michigan – Ohio State football rivalry, Lloyd Carr won five Big Ten titles in his 13 seasons at the helm and posted a winning percentage of .753. His winning percentage of .779 in conference play trails only that of Schembechler in Michigan history. Rich Rodriguez succeeded Carr following his retirement in 2007. Rodriguez coached the Wolverines through the 2010 season, compiling a record of 15–22. Rodriguez would be followed by coach Brady Hoke who would go on to coach four seasons. Hoke would end with a record of 31–20. Hoke was replaced by alumnus Jim Harbaugh beginning with the 2015 season. Harbaugh went on to post an 86–25 record in his nine seasons. In Harbaugh's last three seasons, Michigan won 40 out of their 43 games, including three straight Big Ten Championships and College Football Playoff (CFP) appearances, the third and final of which resulting in Michigan's first national title under the BCS/CFP system. Following the national title season, Harbaugh left for the Los Angeles Chargers and was soon replaced by offensive coordinator Sherrone Moore.

==== Rivalries ====
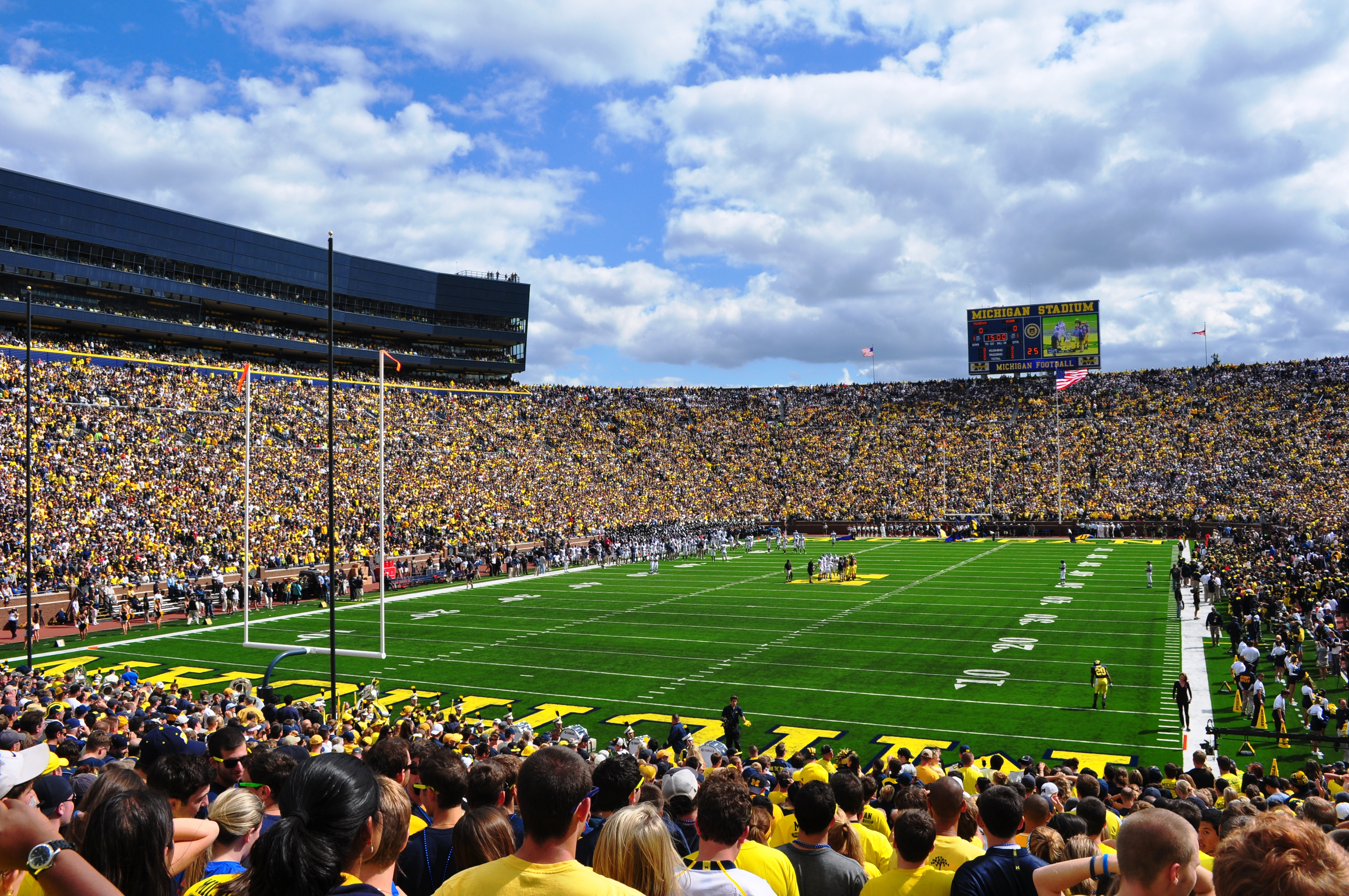
A football game at Michigan Stadium

Heisman Trophy winners
Year	Player
1940	Tom Harmon
1991	Desmond Howard
1997	Charles Woodson

Michigan has a major rivalry with Ohio State, considered one of the fiercest rivalries in American sports. In a pair of ESPN fan polls, in 2000 and 2003, the Michigan–Ohio State series was voted the greatest rivalry in sports in America. Michigan's meeting with Ohio State is almost always the last game of the two schools' regular seasons and has provided many memorable contests, such as the "Snow Bowl" of 1950. The game has frequently decided the Big Ten Champion. As of 2024, Michigan leads the series 62–51–6. The contest on November 18, 2006 marked the first time ever these teams had been ranked No. 1 and No. 2 going into the game, and the first time they were both undefeated since 1973. The 2007 college football match-up between Ohio State and Michigan was predicted to be the No. 2 college football game to watch in 2007 by SI.com's "Top 20 Games To Watch in 2007" list.

Michigan has a rivalry with the Notre Dame Fighting Irish. Michigan leads the series 25–17–1. The two schools are among the top college football programs in all-time wins (Michigan first, Notre Dame fifth) and winning percentage (Michigan third, Notre Dame fourth) in the NCAA Division I Football Bowl Subdivision (formerly Division I-A). When college football was still in its infancy, students from the University of Michigan traveled to South Bend to teach the game to students there.

Michigan also has an intrastate rival in Michigan State; the schools' football teams compete for the Paul Bunyan Trophy. Michigan leads the series 74–38–5.

The Wolverines also have a tradition-rich history with the Minnesota Golden Gophers. The two football teams compete for the Little Brown Jug, a five-gallon jug with the respective schools' "M"s on either side and the scores of previous games down the middle. The Little Brown Jug was the first trophy played for between college football teams. Through 2024, Michigan leads the Brown Jug series 78–25–3.

=== Field hockey ===
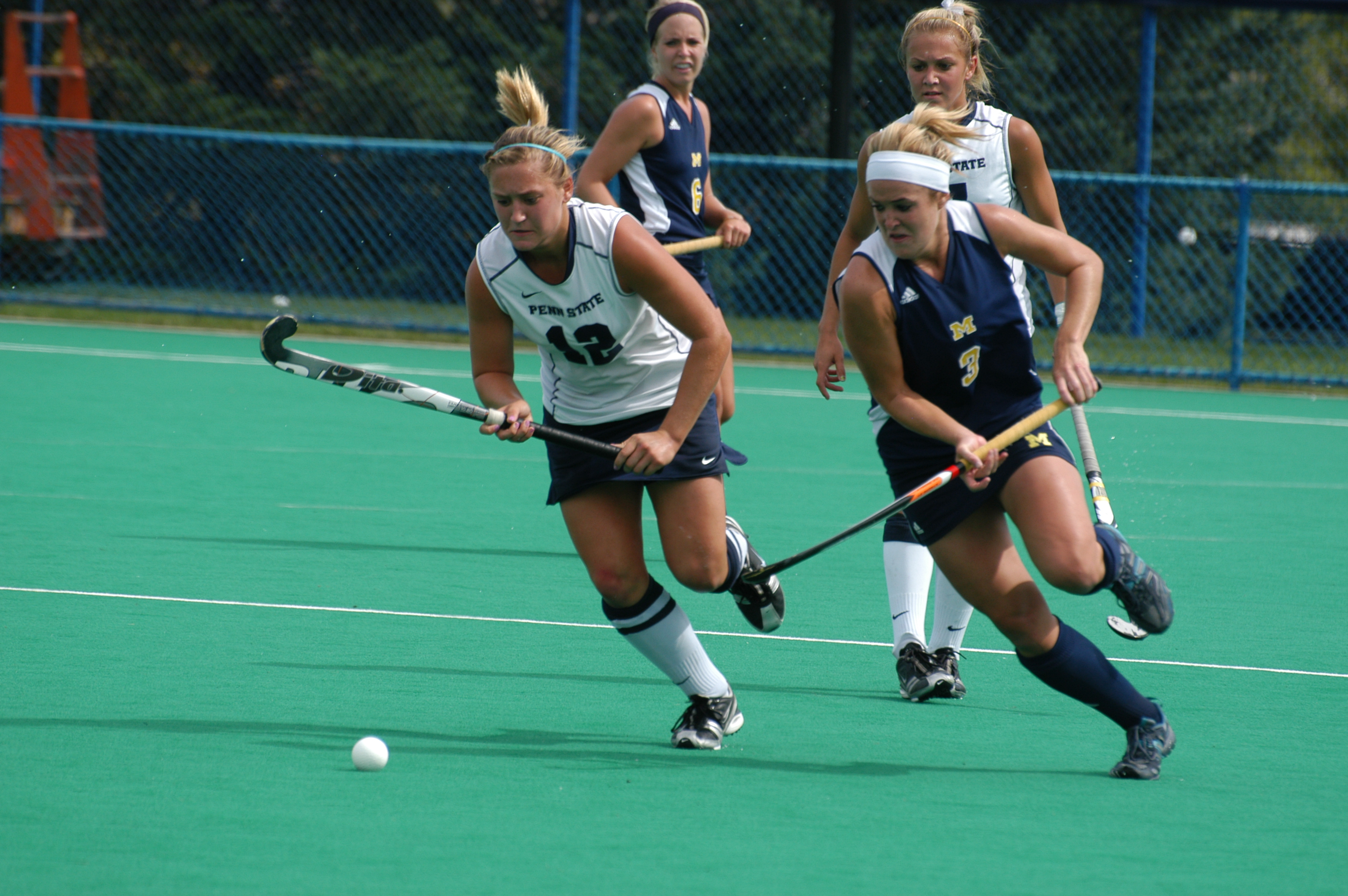
The 2010 Michigan field hockey team in action at Penn State

Women's field hockey became a varsity sport at Michigan in 1973. The Wolverines field hockey team won the 2001 NCAA title, which was the school's first national title in a women's team sport. Marcia Pankratz served as the head coach of the program from 1996 to 2004 and returned to the position in 2009. The Wolverines have won a total of eleven Big Ten regular season titles and nine Big Ten tournaments.

=== Golf ===
==== Men's golf ====
Men's golf has been a varsity sport at Michigan since 1919. The team's first coach was elocution and oratory professor Thomas Trueblood who served as coach from 1920 to 1935. Trueblood led the Michigan golf team to consecutive national championships in 1934 and 1935. Two coaches, Bert Katzenmeyer (1947–1968) and Jim Carras (1982–2002), have had tenures of at least 20 years with the program. Andrew Sapp was the coach from 2002 to 2011. In 2009, he led the team to its best record in more than 50 years with 6th-place finish at the NCAA championship finals. Chris Whitten became head coach in 2011 and led the team to a runner-up finish in 2013. Three Michigan golfers have won the individual intercollegiate golf championships: Johnny Fischer (1932), Chuck Kocsis (1936), and Dave Barclay (1947). The team has won the Big Ten Conference Championship 12 times: 1932–36, 1942–44, 1946–47, 1949, and 1952.

==== Women's golf ====
Women's golf has been a varsity sport at Michigan since 1976. Cheryl Stacy, a former All-American golfer for Ohio State, took over as the team's head coach in 2009. In the fall of 2009, Stacy signed a trio of highly rated high school golfers from Ohio, Florida and Georgia to national letters of intent for the 2010–11 academic year.

The Wolverines won their first Big Ten Championship in 2022 by four shots with a total of 857.

=== Gymnastics ===
==== Men's gymnastics ====
The Michigan men's gymnastics team has won 7 NCAA championships, 23 Big Ten championships and have been invited to 33 NCAA tournaments. Newt Loken was the head coach for 36 years from 1948 to 1983, during which time he coached the Wolverines to two NCAA team gymnastics championships, two NCAA team trampoline championships, and 21 NCAA individual event championships. Since 1999, head coach Kurt Golder has led Michigan to national championships in 1999, 2010, 2013, 2014 and the Super Six at the NCAA tournament in 13 of the last 14 seasons.

Until 1969, men's trampoline was one of the events that comprised the NCAA gymnastics championships. At that time, the event was removed in order to conform to the international gymnastics itinerary. The NCAA then bestowed a separate national title in trampoline for two years, both won by Michigan.

==== Women's gymnastics ====
Women's gymnastics has been a varsity sport at Michigan since 1976. Bev Plocki has been the head coach of the women's gymnastics team since 1990. Under Plocki's leadership, the Wolverines have won 25 Big Ten championships, advanced to 28 consecutive NCAA tournaments (1993–2021) and had seven seasons in which they finished in the Top 5 at the NCAA tournament. The Wolverines gymnastics team won their first NCAA Championship in 2021.

=== Ice hockey ===
Hobey Baker Award winners
Year	Player
1997	Brendan Morrison
2008	Kevin Porter
2023	Adam Fantilli

The Wolverines ice hockey team, which was a member of the Central Collegiate Hockey Association until 2013 and is now a member of the Big Ten Conference, plays its home contests at Yost Ice Arena. The hockey team was coached by Red Berenson, a former UM player and is currently coached by Brandon Naurato. Altogether, the program has won nine NCAA national championships (1948, 1951, 1952, 1953, 1955, 1956, 1964, 1996, 1998). In 2011, the team was invited to the NCAA tournament for a record 21st year in a row. In 2026, Michigan reached the national semifinals (now referred to as the "Frozen Four") for an unmatched 29th time.

Vic Heyliger led Michigan to a record six NCAA titles, including the first one in college hockey history in 1948. Heyliger, who played for the Wolverines from 1935 to 1937, also won national titles as Michigan coach in 1951, 1952, 1953, 1955 and 1956. He was inducted into the U.S. Hockey Hall of Fame in 1974, in recognition of his lifetime achievement. Heyliger is considered instrumental in getting the NCAA Tournament off the ground. Following the 1946–47 season, Heyliger wrote to each of the college coaches around the country to see if they would be interested in creating a national tournament. They obliged and the inaugural four-team NCAA tournament began the following season in 1948. Heyliger was 228–61–13 as head coach at Michigan, and his .776 winning percentage is the best at the school. His only losing season was his first year, 3–6 in 1944–45.

In 1980, Heyliger was inducted into the University of Michigan Hall of Honor. The Vic Heyliger Trophy has been given out at the end of each season by the Michigan hockey team to recognize its most outstanding defenseman.

=== Lacrosse ===
==== Men's lacrosse ====
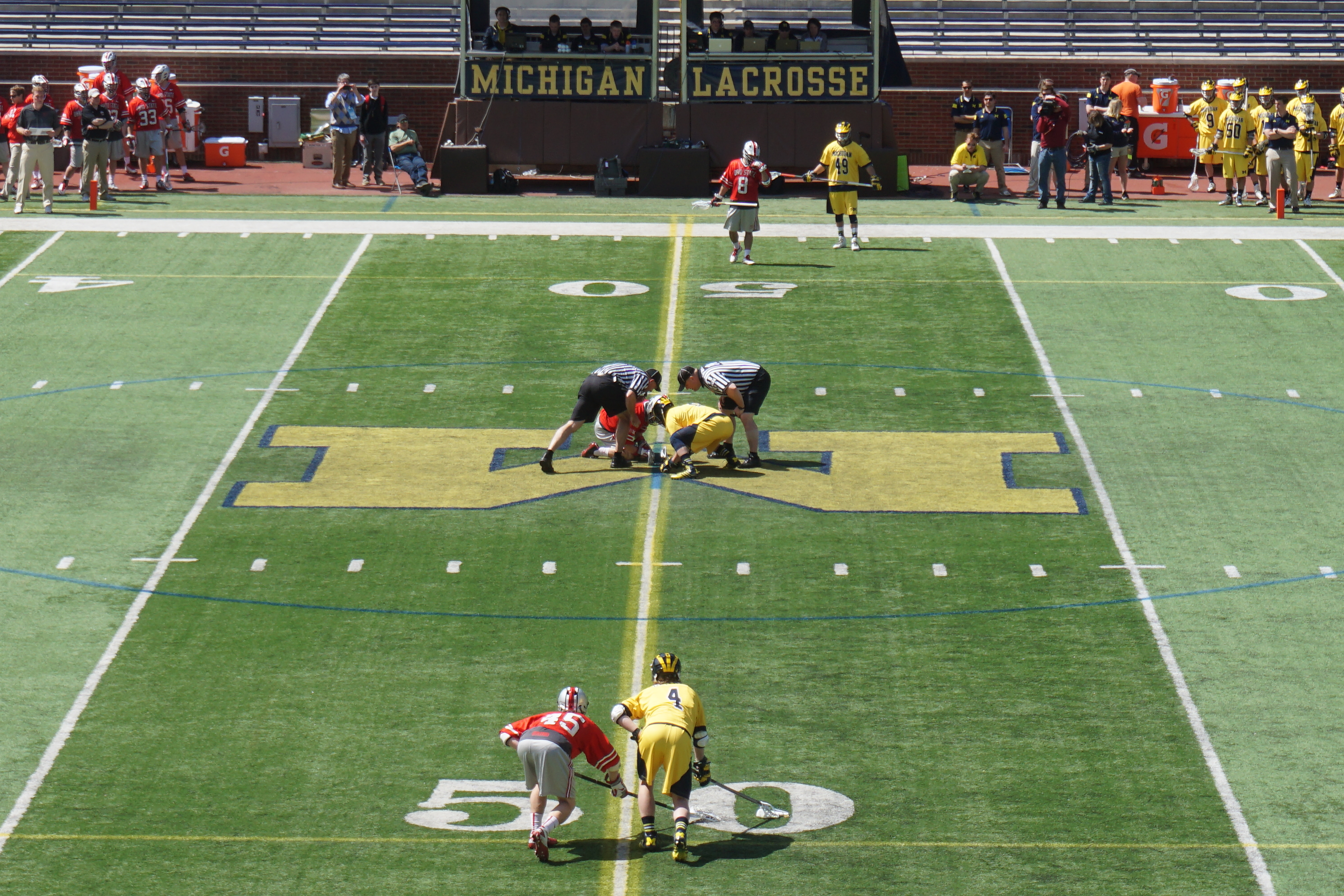
The Michigan men's lacrosse team in action against Ohio State

The Michigan men's lacrosse team is one of the oldest collegiate lacrosse programs in the midwest, having been founded in 1940, the program is also the most successful athletic program at Michigan, with an .830 all-time win percentage. The program was elevated from varsity-club status to NCAA status by the university in May 2011 and began NCAA Division I competition in 2012. The Wolverines previously competed at the Division I level of the Men's Collegiate Lacrosse Association (MCLA), in the Central Collegiate Lacrosse Association (CCLA). In 2008 the team became the first MCLA team to complete a season undefeated, finishing 20–0 and winning their first national championship at Texas Stadium. The feat was repeated in 2009 with another 20–0 season and earned their second national championship with a 12–11 victory over Chapman University at Dick's Sporting Goods Park in Denver, Colorado. In 2010, they won their third MCLA national championship in a row, defeating Arizona State University 12–11 in Denver.

=== Women's rowing ===
Women's rowing has been a varsity at sport at Michigan since 1996. Mark Rothstein has been the team's coach for 18 years – since it was a club sport in 1991. Rothstein led the rowing program "from an over-achieving club squad to one of the nation's top-notch varsity rowing programs." The team has placed in the Top 10 at the NCAA tournament ten times in the past 12 years. The team's best seasons came in 2000–01 and 2011–12 with Big Ten championships and second-place finishes in the NCAA tournament.

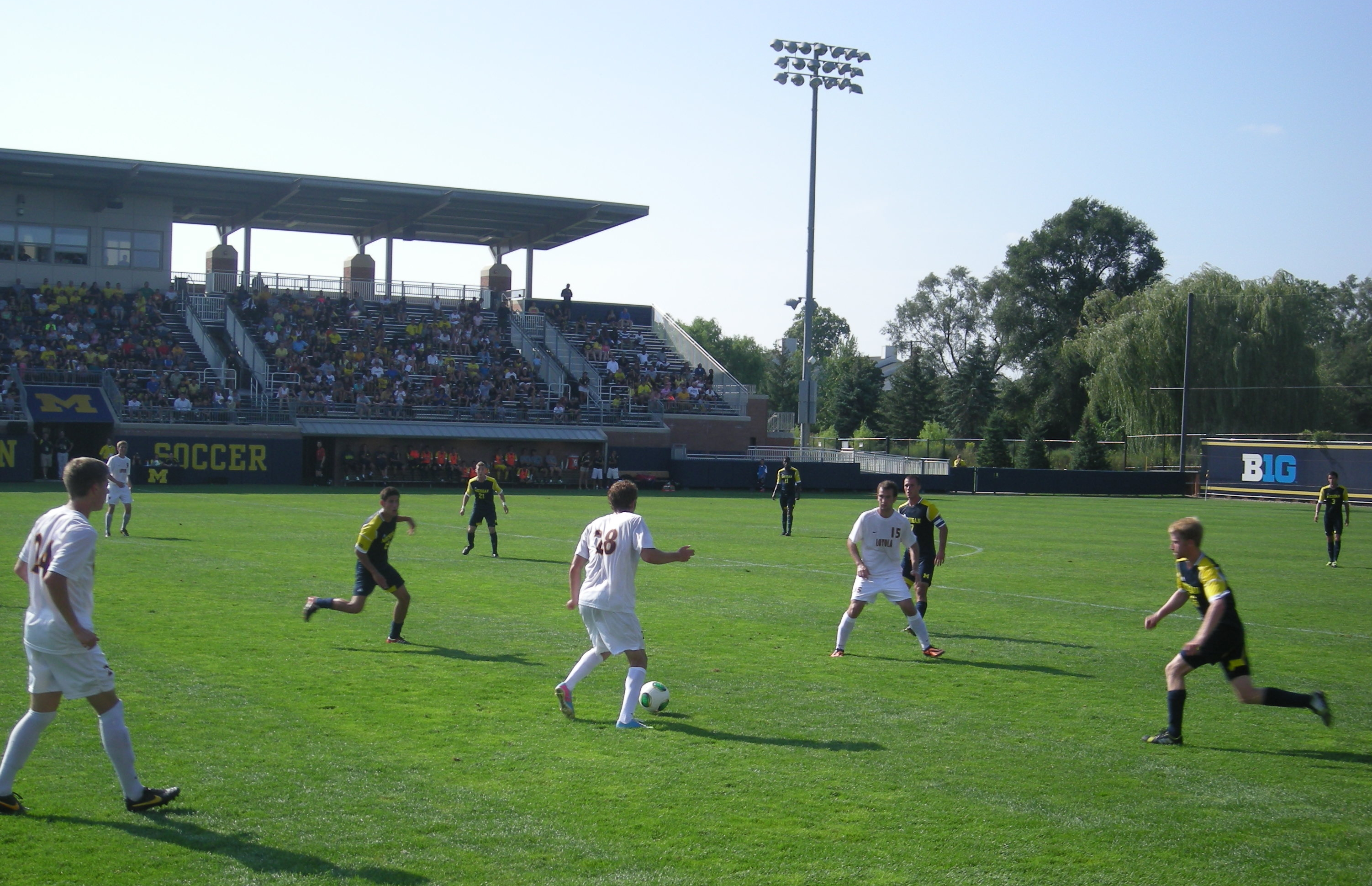
The Michigan men's soccer team against Loyola in 2013

=== Soccer ===
==== Men's soccer ====
The men's soccer team plays Michigan State annually for the rights to the Big Bear Trophy, a wooden sculpture purchased by Michigan head coach Steve Burns in 2000. The men's soccer advanced to the College Cup in 2010, their first in program history. More recently, the program won its first Big Ten championship in 2017.

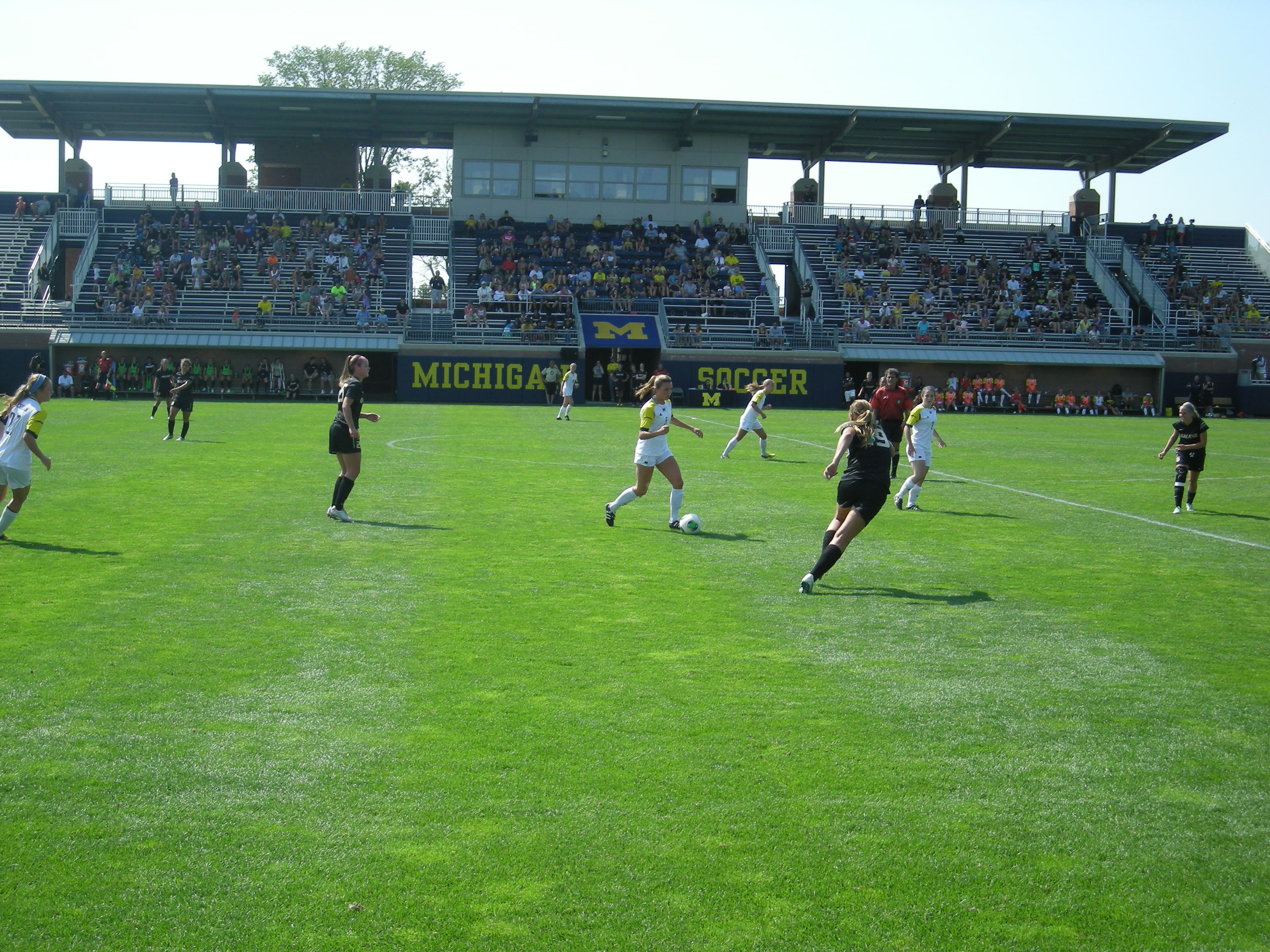
The Michigan women's soccer team against Oakland in 2013

==== Women's soccer ====
The women's soccer team has played at the varsity level since 1994 and has twice won the Big Ten conference tournament, in 1997 and 1999. It has also reached the quarterfinals of the NCAA Division I Women's Soccer Championship twice, in 2002 and 2013 during the tenure of Debbie Rademacher, who coached the team from its inception until 2007. The team is currently coached by Jennifer Klein.

=== Softball ===
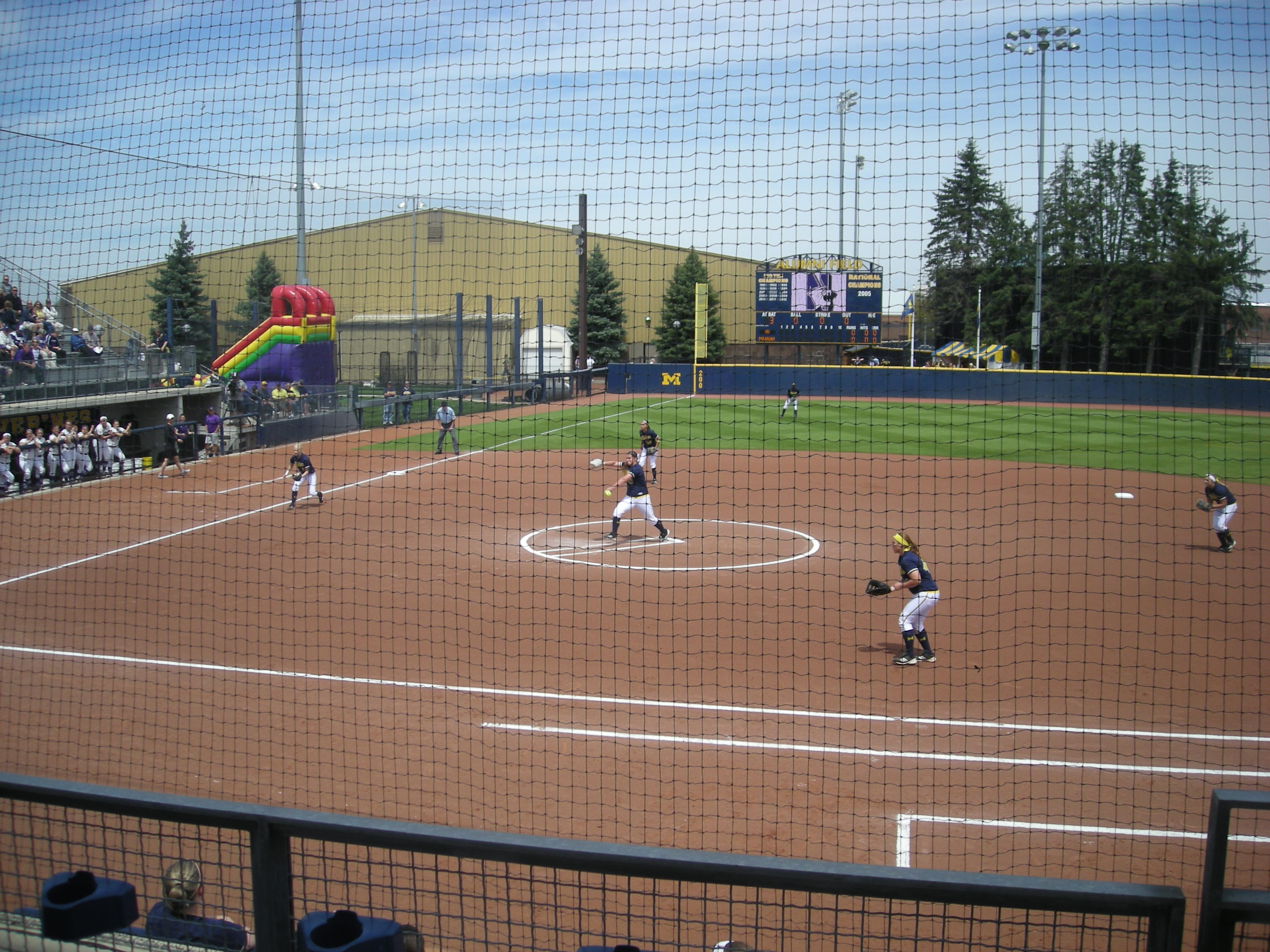
The Michigan softball team playing against Northwestern in 2013

Carol Hutchins has been the head coach of the Michigan Wolverines softball team since 1985. With a career record of 1,274–435–4 (.745 winning percentage), Hutchins has more wins than any other coach in the history of the university—in both men's and women's athletics. Hutchins' teams have won 22 Big Ten championships and appeared in 28 NCAA tournaments. In June 2005, the team won the NCAA Division I Softball Championship, defeating two-time defending champion and perennial softball power UCLA two games to one. Michigan won the decisive game, 4-1, with Samantha Findlay slamming a three-run homer in the top of the tenth inning. Michigan was the first school east of the Mississippi River to win the Women's College World Series since rival Michigan State (with Carol Hutchins playing shortstop) did so in 1976. The Wolverines have appeared in 13 Women's College World Series, in 1982, 1995–98, 2001–02, 2004–05, 2009, 2013 and 2015–16.

=== Swimming and diving ===
The men's and women's swimming and diving teams, which had been coached separately, were combined in August 2012 by the University of Michigan Athletic Department.

==== Men's swimming and diving ====
Men's swimming and diving has been a varsity sport at Michigan since 1921. With 12 NCAA national championships (as well as 7 unofficial) including the 2013 NCAA championship, the Michigan men's swimming and diving team has won more national championships than any other varsity sport in the history of the university. In addition to its 19 national championships, the team has finished in the Top 5 nationally 48 times. The team's swimmers have also won 145 individual NCAA championships. Three head coaches have led the squad for a combined 77 years: Matt Mann (1925–54), Gus Stager (1954–82) and Jon Urbanchek (1982–2004). Michigan swimmers and divers inducted into the International Swimming Hall of Fame include Mike Barrowman, Dick Degener, Tom Dolan, Taylor Drysdale, Bruce Harlan, Harry Holiday, Dick Kimball, Carl Robie, and Bob Webster. Mike Bottom took over as the team's head coach in 2008. In his first season as the team's head coach, Bottom led the Wolverines to a Big Ten championship and a 7th-place finish at the NCAA championship. In 2013, Bottom won the program's 12th official NCAA national championship (19th overall) and its first since 1995.

==== Women's swimming and diving ====
Women's swimming and diving has been a varsity sport at Michigan since 1974. The team has won 19 Big Ten championships, including 12 consecutive championships from 1986 to 1998. The team has also finished in the Top 10 teams nationally 17 times. The team's best finish came in the 1994–95 season with a second-place finish in the national tournament. The team has produced several national individual champions, including Julie Bachman (one-meter and three-meter diving, 1978), Emily Brunemann (1,650-yard freestyle, 2008), Ann Colloton (200-yard backstroke, 1989), Mary Fischbach (one-meter and three-meter diving, 1988), Mindy Gehrs (400-yard individual medley, 1993), Lara Hooiveld (100-yard and 200-yard breaststroke, 1993), Alecia Humphrey (100-yard backstroke, 1994; 200-yard backstroke 1994 and 1995), Sue Cahill (400-yard individual medley, 1982), and Chris Seufert (one-meter and three-meter diving, 1977). Jim Richardson is in his 25th season as the head coach of the women's swimming and diving team.

=== Tennis ===
==== Men's tennis ====
Michigan's men's tennis team was formed in 1893. Between 1948 and 1999, the team had two head coaches. William Murphy was the coach from 1948 to 1969 and led the Wolverines to 11 Big Ten championships and the NCAA championship in 1957 with Barry MacKay. Brian Eisner was the coach from 1969 to 1999 and led the team to 16 Big Ten championships and 21 NCAA tournament appearances. Peter Fishbach and Eric Friedler played for the school. Joel Ross was captain of the tennis team, and was Big Ten singles champion in 1971.

Bruce Berque was the head coach from 2004 to 2014 and led the team to four consecutive appearances in the NCAA tournament. The current coach is Adam Steinberg.

==== Women's tennis ====
Women's tennis was established as a varsity sport in 1973. Bitsy Ritt was the head coach for 22 years from 1984 to 2006 and led the team to NCAA tournament berths in 8 of her last 11 years as head coach. The current head coach is Ronni Bernstein who has led the team to NCAA tournament berths in her first two years with the program.

=== Track and field ===
==== Men's track and field ====
The men's track and field team has won 57 Big Ten men's team titles and one NCAA team championship. Notable alumni include Ralph Craig, winner of two gold medals at the 1912 Olympics, Brian Diemer, 1984 Summer Olympics bronze medalist in the steeplechase, Bill Donakowski, U.S. marathon champion in 1986, Archie Hahn, a winner of four Olympic gold medals at the 1904 and 1906 Olympics, DeHart Hubbard, the first African-American to win an individual Olympic gold medal and a former world record holder in the long jump, Greg Meyer, 1983 Boston Marathon winner, Ralph Rose, winner of 3 gold, 2 silver and 1 bronze medals in three Olympic games, Kevin Sullivan, Canadian 1500 meter record holder, Eddie Tolan, winner of two gold medals and a former world record holder in the 100-yard dash, Alan Webb, U.S. mile record holder, and Nick Willis, a four-time Olympian and a two-time Olympic medallist, with a silver medal at the Beijing Olympics in 2008, and a bronze at the summer Rio Olympics in 2016, Joseph Ellis, a multiple-time Big Ten champion and first-team All American in the hammer throw and member of the British national team, and Andrew Liskowitz, a Big Ten champion and first-team all American in the shot put.

==== Women's track and field ====
Women's track and field was established as a varsity sport in 1978. The team has won 18 Big Ten titles (eight outdoor and ten indoor). James Henry has been the head coach since 1984. The Wolverines have had their strongest finishes in the NCAA championship meet in recent years—finishing third outdoors in 2007 and third indoors in 2008. Notable alumna include Lisa Larsen Weidenbach Rainsberger, who won the Boston and Chicago Marathons.

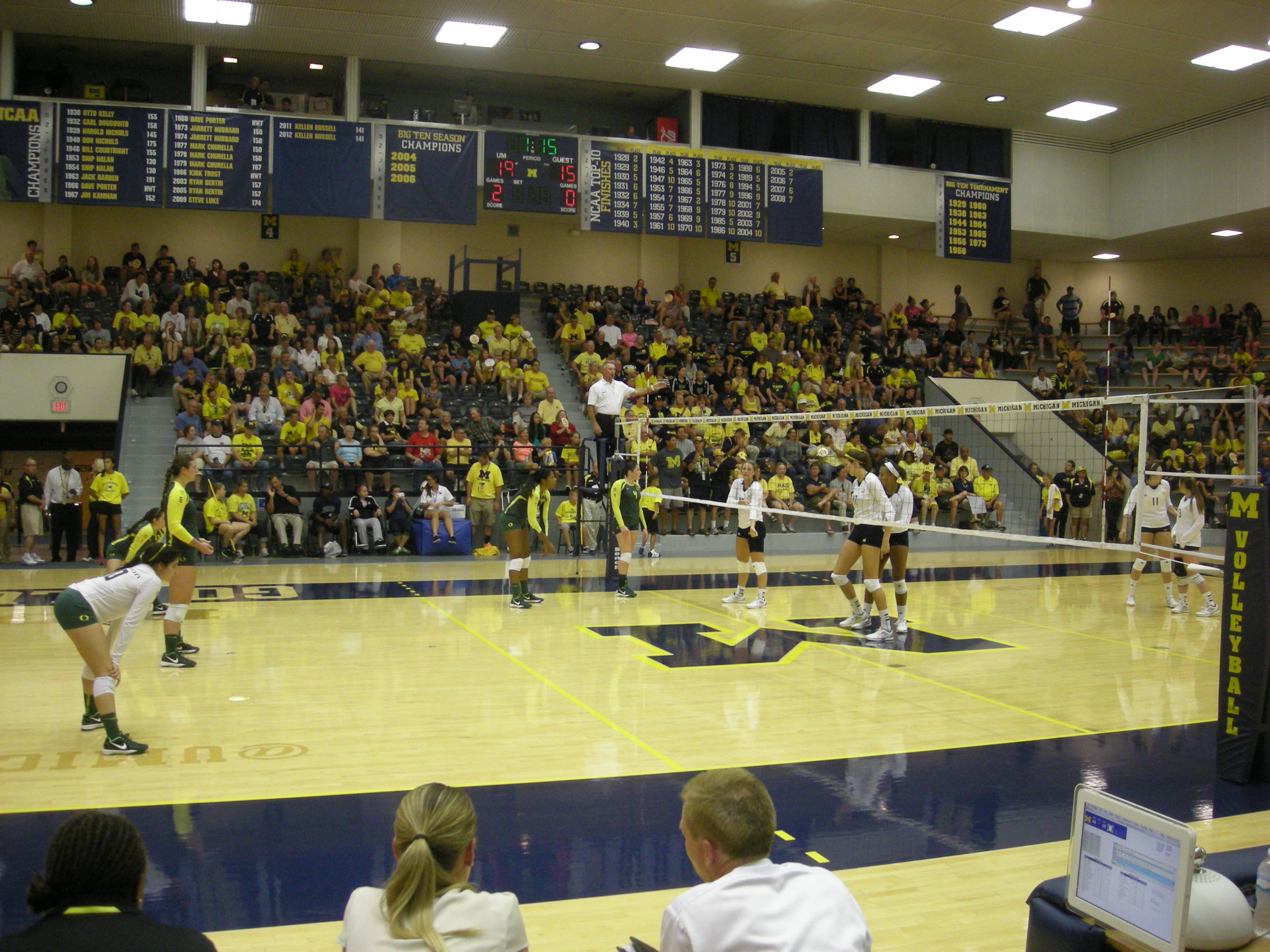
The Michigan volleyball team playing against Oregon in 2013

=== Women's volleyball ===
The women's volleyball program at the University of Michigan began in 1973. Mark Rosen has been the head coach since 1999 and has led the team to the NCAA Tournament in 18 of his 22 years as head coach, as well as took the program to its first-ever national semifinal in the NCAA Tournament in 2012.

=== Women's water polo ===
Women's water polo became a varsity sport at the University of Michigan in 2001. In its first nine years, the program has placed first in the conference nine times, won eight NCAA division titles and four NCAA eastern titles, and appeared four times in the NCAA national tournament. The Wolverines finished in the Top 5 at the national tournament in 2002 and 2009.

In the spring of 2014, the Athletic Department hired Dr. Marcelo Leonardi as their new head coach. The Wolverines enter their 15th season in 2015. Former Olympic Gold Medalist Betsey Armstrong was hired as the assistant coach in 2012.

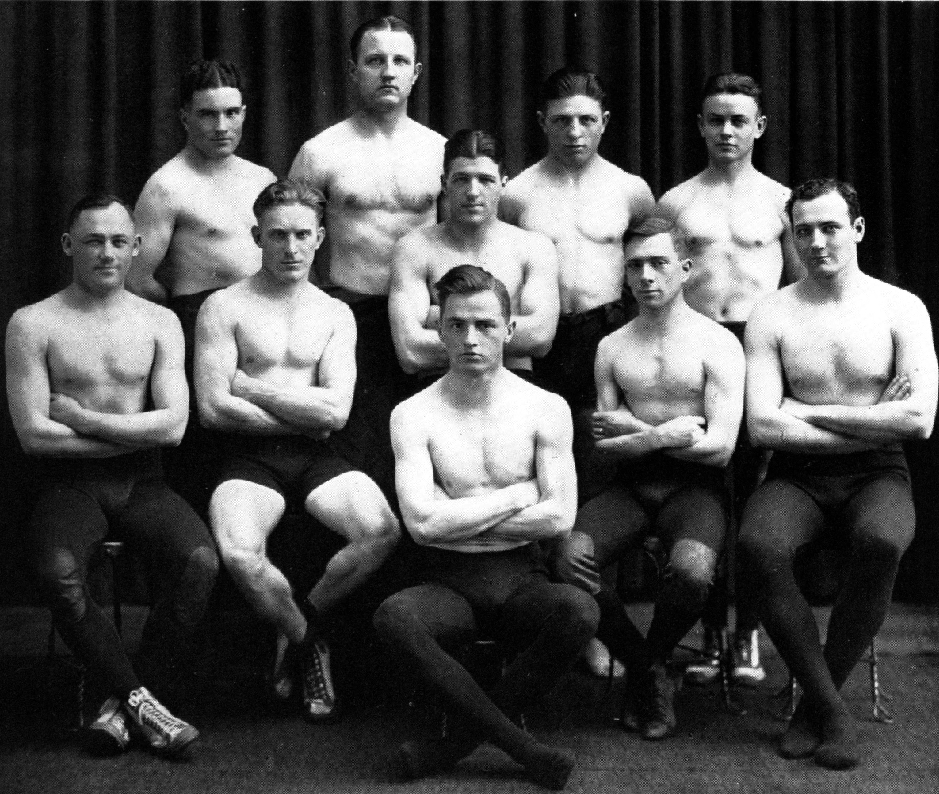
1922 Michigan wrestling team

=== Wrestling ===
Wrestling has been a varsity sport at Michigan since 1921. The Wolverines have finished in the Top 5 in the NCAA tournament 19 times. Home dual meets and tournaments take place at Cliff Keen Arena, dedicated and named after longtime wrestling coach Cliff Keen, who coached the team from 1925 until 1970 and led the Wolverines wrestling team to 13 Big Ten Conference championships. The Michigan wrestling team has produced 175 individual NCAA All-Americans dating back to 1928, has 22 individual NCAA Championships for the university, and made two winners of the NCAA Most Outstanding Wrestler Award (1940, 1978).

A few notable former Wolverine wrestlers include Olympic gold medalist Steve Fraser, 1978 NCAA Most Outstanding Wrestler Mark Churella, professional wrestlers The Steiner Brothers and 2006 Greco-Roman World Wrestling Champion Joe Warren, currently a mixed martial artist in Bellator MMA.

== Sponsorship ==
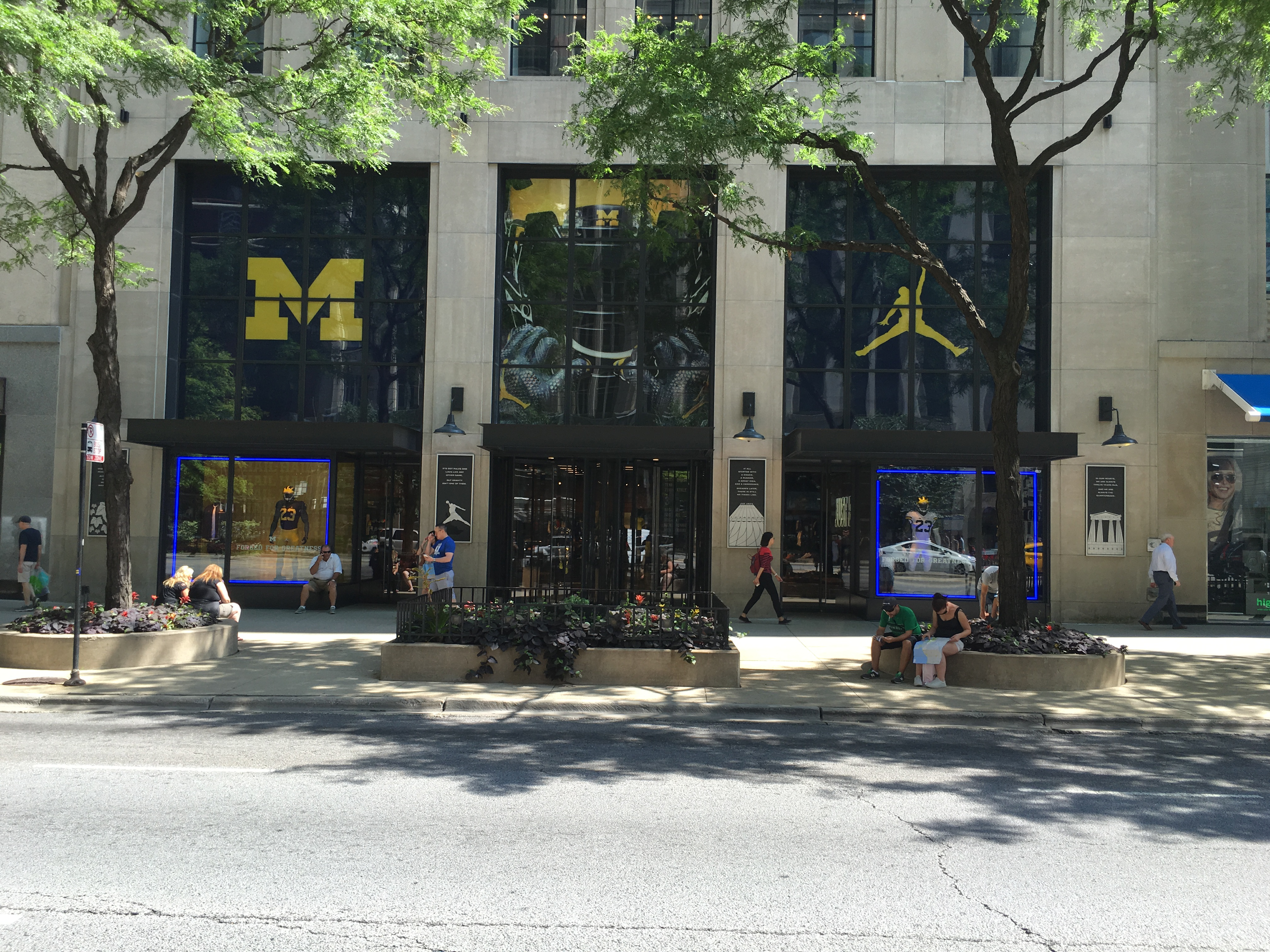
Michigan logo and the jumpman logo at the Nike, Inc. flagship store on the Magnificent Mile during the week before the opening game for the 2016 Michigan Wolverines football team

Michigan Athletics announced in July 2015 that it would switch from sponsorship by Adidas to Nike. The deal at the time had an estimated value of $169 million and was described as "the richest apparel deal in intercollegiate athletics". In April 2016, the University announced the signing of an 11-year $127.12 million contract for 31 Michigan sports teams, going into effect on August 1. With the agreement, Michigan Wolverines football became the first football program to wear Jordan Brand attire accompanied by the jumpman logo. Nike identifies the yellow color in the new uniforms as "Amarillo" rather than the traditional "Maize".

== Varsity club sports ==
In 2000, athletic director Bill Martin announced the creation of a special level for sports at Michigan called Varsity Club status. The new system was established to recognize and increase support for club sports teams that have reached a level of budget, organization and competition that is similar to varsity levels. Varsity club squads are not necessarily closer to being elevated to full varsity status, and will remain for the time being primarily self-funded and administered through the Department of Recreational Sports. However, the designation will give these teams a closer relationship to the U-M athletic department. The Varsity Club status has proven to be a launching pad for sports to eventually become varsity sports at Michigan. In May 2011, men's and women's lacrosse were officially granted varsity status. Men's lacrosse began their first season of NCAA competition in 2012, and the women's program began varsity competition in 2014.

Current varsity club sports:

- The Michigan Men's Rowing Team
- Women's synchronized skating
- Women's synchronized swimming

== Club sports ==
The Club Sports Program at the University of Michigan, administered by the Department of Recreational Sports, comprises 38 club sports. Each club sport is a student-led organization composed primarily of students, faculty, and staff. Each club is formed, developed, governed, and administered by the student membership of that particular club, working with the Club Sports Program staff.

The club sports programs include:

- Alpine skiing
- Baseball
- Basketball
- Boxing – Men
- Boxing – Women
- Brazilian jiu-jitsu
- Climbing
- Cycling
- Dance
- Esports
- Fencing
- Field Hockey
- Gymnastics
- Ice hockey – Men
- Ice hockey – Women
- Lacrosse – Women
- Rifle
- Roller hockey
- Rugby – Men
- Rugby – Women
- Running
- Sailing
- Shotokan
- Soccer – Men
- Soccer – Women
- Softball
- Tae Kwon Do
- Tennis
- Triathlon
- Ultimate frisbee – Men
- Ultimate frisbee – Women
- Volleyball – Men
- Volleyball – Women
- Water polo – Men
- Water polo – Women
- Waterski
- Weightlifting
- Wrestling

=== Boxing ===
The men's and women's boxing teams compete as part of the United States Intercollegiate Boxing Association. The men's team won the USIBA national championship in 2014 and 2017, while the women's team won four straight championships from 2015 to 2018 and was the runner-up in the 2022 tournament. Michigan also hosted the 2015 USIBA tournament.

=== Rugby ===
The University of Michigan Rugby Football Club plays college rugby in the Big Ten Universities conference of Division I-A against its traditional rivals such as Michigan State and Ohio State. The Michigan rugby club was formed in 1959, although rugby at Michigan dates back to at least 1890 before fading from campus. Michigan rugby is led by head coach Brandon Sparks. Michigan reached the 2013 Big Ten championship match, where they lost to Indiana 58–38. Michigan played in the 2014 Collegiate Rugby Championship, notching some upset wins to reach the quarterfinals in a tournament broadcast live on NBC from PPL Park in Philadelphia. Michigan returned to the 2015 Collegiate Rugby Championship, where they notched wins against UCLA and Texas to again reach the quarterfinals.

== Athletic facilities ==
Facility	Tenant	Capacity	Constructed	Notes
Alumni Field at Carol Hutchins Stadium	Softball	2,800	2008	Alumni Field was built in 1982. It is part of the Wilpon Baseball and Softball Complex. In 2023, the stadium was named after former longtime softball coach Carol Hutchins.
Belleville Lake	Women's rowing	N/A	1999	The Michigan Boathouse was built in 1999 and is the facility the rowing team uses. The men's team is a club sport and uses separate facilities on Argo Pond.
Cliff Keen Arena	Men's gymnastics, women's volleyball, wrestling	1,800	1956	Originally named Matt Mann Pool and was home to the men's and women's swimming and diving teams from 1956 to 1988. It was converted into an arena and named Varsity Arena in 1988. It was dedicated and named after longtime wrestling coach Cliff Keen in 1990.
Crisler Center	Men's basketball, women's basketball, women's gymnastics	12,707	1967	Was known as Crisler Arena until December 22, 2011.
Donald B. Canham Natatorium	Swimming and diving, women's water polo	1,200	1988	
Ferry Field	Men's outdoor track and field, women's outdoor track and field	N/A	1906	Former home to the Michigan football team from 1906 to 1926.
Michigan Stadium	Football	107,601	1927	Former home to Michigan field hockey, men's lacrosse, and women's lacrosse.
Phyllis Ocker Field	Field hockey	500	1995	
Ray Fisher Stadium	Baseball	4,000	2008	Ray Fisher Stadium was built in 1923. It is part of the Wilpon Baseball and Softball Complex.
U-M Golf Course	Men's cross country, women's cross country, men's golf, women's golf	N/A	1931	One of six of golf courses designed by Alister MacKenzie.
U-M Indoor Track Building	Men's indoor track and field, women's indoor track and field	N/A	1974	
U-M Lacrosse Stadium	Men's lacrosse, women's lacrosse	2,000	2017	
U-M Soccer Stadium	Men's soccer, women's soccer	2,200	2010	Part of the U-M Soccer Complex.
Varsity Tennis Center	Men's tennis, women's tennis	Indoor: 632 Outdoor: 600	1997	The indoor tennis building is named the Preston Robert Tisch Building and the outdoor tennis courts are named William Clay Ford Outdoor Courts.
Yost Ice Arena	Men's ice hockey	5,800	1923	Opened in 1923 as Yost Fieldhouse. The hockey team moved in during the 1973–74 season.

=== Other facilities ===
Facility	Sport	Constructed	Notes
Al Glick Fieldhouse	Football	2009	Al Glick Fieldhouse is the largest indoor football practice facility in the world.
Bahna Wrestling Center	Wrestling	2009	Training and practice facility for the wrestling team.
Donald R. Shepherd Training Center	Women's Gymnastics	2002	Training and practice facility for the women's gymnastics team.
Junge Family Champions Center	Multiple	2005	Center used for press conferences for the football, men's & women's basketball and men's ice hockey programs. As well as major athletic announcements and banquets.
Newt Loken Training Center	Men's Gymnastics	1913	Training and practice facility for the men's gymnastics team.
Oosterbaan Fieldhouse	Named after former player and coach Bennie Oosterbaan it now serves as the current home for the men's and women's lacrosse team, as well as a practice facility to several other sports. Baseball, Men's and Women's Lacrosse, Softball, Men's and Women's Soccer,	1980	Multi-sport indoor practice facility with a FieldTurf surface.
Weisfeld Family Golf Center	Men's and Women's Golf	2012	Indoor practice facility for the Men's and Women's Golf teams. It is the first Geothermal building on campus.
William Davidson Player Development Center	Men's and Women's Basketball	2011	Training and practice facility the Men's and Women's Basketball teams. Part of Crisler Center.

== Championships ==
=== NCAA team championships ===
Michigan has won 37 NCAA team national championships.

- Men's (34)
  - Baseball (2): 1953, 1962
  - Basketball (2): 1989, 2026
  - Gymnastics (7): 1963, 1970, 1999, 2010, 2013, 2014, 2025
  - Ice Hockey (9): 1948, 1951, 1952, 1953, 1955, 1956, 1964, 1996, 1998
  - Outdoor Track & Field (1): 1923
  - Swimming (12): 1937, 1938, 1939, 1940, 1941, 1948, 1957, 1958, 1959, 1961, 1995, 2013
  - Tennis (1): 1957
- Women's (3)
  - Field Hockey (1): 2001
  - Gymnastics (1): 2021
  - Softball (1): 2005
- See also:
  - List of NCAA schools with the most NCAA Division I championships
  - Big Ten Conference NCAA national team championships

=== Other national team championships ===
Below are 23 national team titles that were not bestowed by the NCAA (although seven were unofficial NCAA championships).

- Men's (23)
  - Football (12): 1901, 1902, 1903, 1904, 1918, 1923, 1932, 1933, 1947, 1948, 1997, 2023
  - Golf ^{†} (2): 1934, 1935
  - Swimming (7): 1927, 1928, 1931, 1932, 1934, 1935, 1936
  - Trampoline (2): 1969, 1970

† The NCAA started sponsoring the intercollegiate golf championship in 1939. It retained the titles from the 41 championships previously conferred by the National Intercollegiate Golf Association in its records, but Michigan's two titles in 1934 and 1935 do not count to its NCAA championship total.

University of Michigan teams have also been national runners-up 44 times in 14 different sports: baseball (1), men's basketball (6), women's cross country (1), field hockey (2), men's golf (3), men's gymnastics (5), women's gymnastics (2), men's ice hockey (3), rowing (2), softball (1), men's swimming and diving (10), women's swimming and diving (1), men's outdoor track and field (1), and wrestling (6).

- See also:
  - List of Big Ten Conference National Championships
  - List of NCAA schools with the most Division I national championships

== NCAA Division I Directors' Cup ==
In the NCAA Division I Director's Cup (renamed Learfield Sports Directors' Cup), Michigan has ranked No. 1 in the Big Ten rankings in 17 out of the last 32 years ending in 2025–26; the university has ranked in the top five nationally a total of 15 years during that span.

Year	Rank: National	Rank: Big Ten
1993–94	9th	2nd
1994–95	7th	1st
1995–96	5th	1st
1996–97	T–11th	2nd
1997–98	5th	1st
1998–99	6th	3rd
1999–00	3rd	1st
2000–01	4th	1st
2001–02	6th	1st
2002–03	4th	2nd
2003–04	2nd	1st
2004–05	4th	1st
2005–06	24th	5th
2006–07	4th	1st
2007–08	3rd	1st
2008–09	5th	1st
2009–10	25th	5th
2010–11	15th	3rd
2011–12	10th	2nd
2012–13	4th	1st
2013–14	13th	2nd
2014–15	19th	4th
2015–16	3rd	2nd
2016–17	6th	2nd
2017–18	6th	1st
2018–19	2nd	1st
2019–20	Not awarded because of the COVID-19 pandemic	
2020–21	3rd	1st
2021–22	3rd	1st
2022–23	11th	2nd
2023–24	8th	1st
2024–25	13th	4th
2025–26	9th	3rd

University	Top 10 rankings (1993–2026)
Stanford	32
Florida	32
Texas	27
North Carolina	26
UCLA	25
Michigan	24
USC	21

== Olympians ==
Through the 2008 Summer Olympics, 204 UM students and coaches had participated in the Olympics, winning medals at each Summer Olympic Games except 1896, and winning gold medals in all but four Olympiads. Through the year 2020, UM students/student-coaches (notably, Michael Phelps) have won a total of 185 Olympic medals: 85 golds, 48 silvers, and 52 bronzes.

Last	First	Year	Sport	Event	Medal	Country
Abbott	Jim	1988	baseball		gold	USA
Amine	Myles	2020	wrestling	86k freestyle	bronze	San Marino
Armstrong	Betsey	2008	water polo		silver	USA
Arsenault	Samantha	2000	swimming	800 m freestyle relay	gold	USA
Barrowman	Mike	1992	swimming	200 m breaststroke	gold	USA
Barton	Greg	1984	kayaking	1000 m single	bronze	USA
Barton	Greg	1988	kayaking	1000 m single	gold	USA
Barton	Greg	1988	kayaking	1000 m double	gold	USA
Barton	Greg	1992	kayaking	1000 m single	bronze	USA
Bernard	Kent	1964	track	4 × 100 m relay	bronze	Tri.-Tobago
Boggs	Phil	1976	diving	3 meter	gold	USA
Booker	James	1924	track	pole vault	bronze	USA
Borges	Gustavo	1992	swimming	100 m freestyle	silver	Brazil
Borges	Gustavo	1996	swimming	100 m freestyle	bronze	Brazil
Borges	Gustavo	1996	swimming	200 m freestyle	silver	Brazil
Borges	Gustavo	2000	swimming	100 m freestyle	bronze	Brazil
Brost	Todd	1992	ice hockey		silver	Canada
Brundage	Jennifer	2000	softball		gold	USA
Chidester	Amanda	2020	softball		silver	USA
Christy	Jim	1932	swimming	1500 m freestyle	bronze	USA
Clawson	John	1968	basketball		gold	USA
Coe	William	1904	track	shot put	silver	USA
Corson	Marilyn	1968	swimming	400 m freestyle relay	bronze	USA
Craig	Ralph	1912	track	100 meters	gold	USA
Craig	Ralph	1912	track	200 meters	gold	USA
Darnton	William	1960	swimming	400 m medley relay	gold	USA
Davies	John	1952	swimming	200 m breaststroke	gold	Australia
Davis/White	Meryl/Charlie	2014	skating	ice dancing	gold	USA
Davis/White	Meryl/Charlie	2010	skating	ice dancing	silver	USA
Degener	Richard	1932	diving	springboard	bronze	USA
Degener	Richard	1936	diving	springboard	gold	USA
DeLoof	Catie	2020	swimming	400 m freestyle relay	bronze	USA
Diemer	Brian	1984	track	3000 m steeplechase	bronze	USA
Doherty	Ken	1928	track	decathlon	bronze	USA
Dolan	Tom	1996	swimming	400 m ind. medley	gold	USA
Dolan	Tom	2000	swimming	400 m ind. medley	gold	USA
Dolan	Tom	2000	swimming	200 m ind. medley	silver	USA
Downie	Gordon	1976	swimming	800 m freestyle relay	bronze	Great Britain
Duenkel	Ginny	1964	swimming	100 m freestyle	bronze	USA
Duenkel	Ginny	1964	swimming	400 m backstroke	gold	USA
Dvorak	Charles	1904	track	pole vault	gold	USA
Dvorak	John	1900	track	pole vault	silver	USA
Fraser	Steve	1984	wrestling	Greco-Roman	gold	USA
Gaxiola	Álvaro	1968	diving	platform	silver	Mexico
Gillanders	Dave	1960	swimming	200 m butterfly	bronze	USA
Gillanders	Dave	1960	swimming	400 m medley relay	gold	USA
Gorski	Mark	1984	cycling	1000 m sprint	gold	USA
Hagelin	Carl	2014	ice hockey		silver	Sweden
Hahn	Archie	1904	track	60 meters	gold	USA
Hahn	Archie	1904	track	100 meters	gold	USA
Hahn	Archie	1904	track	200 meters	gold	USA
Hahn	Archie	1906	track	100 meters	gold	USA
Handy	H. J. "Jam"	1904	swimming	440 yd (400 m) breaststroke	bronze	USA
Handy	H. J. "Jam"	1924	water polo		bronze	USA
Hanley	Dick	1956	swimming	800 m freestyle relay	silver	USA
Harlan	Bruce	1948	diving	3 meter	bronze	USA
Harlan	Bruce	1948	diving	platform	silver	USA
Harlock	Dave	1994	ice hockey		silver	Canada
Haughey	Siobhán	2020	swimming	100 m freestyle	silver	Hong Kong
Haughey	Siobhán	2020	swimming	200 m freestyle	silver	Hong Kong
Hayes	Howard	1900	track	800 meters	silver	USA
Herland	Doug	1984	rowing	pairs with coxswain	bronze	USA
Hubbard	Phil	1976	basketball		gold	USA
Hubbard	William DeHart	1924	track	long jump	gold	USA
Ikola	Willard	1956	ice hockey		silver	USA
Garrels	John	1908	track	shot put	bronze	USA
Garrels	John	1908	track	110 meter hurdles	silver	USA
Jacobson	Sada	2004	fencing	individual sabre	bronze	USA
Jacobson	Sada	2008	fencing	team sabre	bronze	USA
Jacobson	Sada	2008	fencing	individual sabre	silver	USA
Johnson	Carl	1920	track	long jump	silver	USA
Johnson	Jack	2010	ice hockey		silver	USA
Johnson	Kate	2004	rowing	eight	silver	USA
Jones	Burwell	1952	swimming	800 m freestyle relay	gold	USA
Kennedy	Bill	1972	swimming	400 m medley relay	bronze	Canada
Ketchum	Dan	2004	swimming	800 m freestyle relay	gold	USA
Kimball	Bruce	1984	diving	platform	silver	USA
King	Micki	1972	diving	3 meter	gold	USA
Kraenzlein	Alvin	1900	track	60 meter dash	gold	USA
Kraenzlein	Alvin	1900	track	110 meter hurdles	gold	USA
Kraenzlein	Alvin	1900	track	220 meter hurdles	gold	USA
Kraenzlein	Alvin	1900	track	long jump	gold	USA
Landström	Eeles	1960	track	pole vault	bronze	Finland
Lang	Brent	1988	swimming	400 m freestyle relay	gold	USA
Larkin	Barry	1984	baseball		silver	USA
Mac Neil	Maggie	2020	swimming	100 m butterfly	gold	Canada
Mac Neil	Maggie	2020	swimming	400 m freestyle relay	silver	Canada
Mac Neil	Maggie	2020	swimming	400 m medley relay	bronze	Canada
Mahoney	Bill	1972	swimming	400 m medley relay	bronze	Canada
Malchow	Tom	1996	swimming	200 m butterfly	silver	USA
Malchow	Tom	2000	swimming	200 m butterfly	gold	USA
Merriott	Ron	1984	diving	3 meter	bronze	USA
Matchefts	John	1956	ice hockey		silver	USA
McClatchey	Alan	1976	swimming	800 m freestyle relay	bronze	Great Britain
McLean	John	1900	track	high hurdles	silver	USA
Namesnik	Eric	1992	swimming	400 m ind. medley	silver	USA
Namesnik	Eric	1996	swimming	400 m ind. medley	silver	USA
Orwig	Bernice	2000	water polo		silver	USA
Phelps	Michael	2004	swimming	200 m ind. medley	gold	USA
Phelps	Michael	2004	swimming	400 m ind. medley	gold	USA
Phelps	Michael	2004	swimming	100 m butterfly	gold	USA
Phelps	Michael	2004	swimming	200 m butterfly	gold	USA
Phelps	Michael	2004	swimming	200 m freestyle	bronze	USA
Phelps	Michael	2004	swimming	400 m freestyle relay	bronze	USA
Phelps	Michael	2004	swimming	800 m freestyle relay	gold	USA
Phelps	Michael	2004	swimming	400 m medley relay	gold	USA
Phelps	Michael	2008	swimming	400 m ind. medley	gold	USA
Phelps	Michael	2008	swimming	400 m freestyle relay	gold	USA
Phelps	Michael	2008	swimming	200 m freestyle	gold	USA
Phelps	Michael	2008	swimming	200 m butterfly	gold	USA
Phelps	Michael	2008	swimming	800 m freestyle relay	gold	USA
Phelps	Michael	2008	swimming	200 m ind. medley	gold	USA
Phelps	Michael	2008	swimming	100 m butterfly	gold	USA
Phelps	Michael	2008	swimming	400 m medley relay	gold	USA
Phelps	Michael	2008	swimming	100 m butterfly	gold	USA
Phelps	Michael	2012	swimming	800 m freestyle relay	gold	USA
Phelps	Michael	2012	swimming	400 m medley relay	gold	USA
Phelps	Michael	2012	swimming	100 m butterfly	gold	USA
Phelps	Michael	2012	swimming	200 m ind. medley	gold	USA
Phelps	Michael	2012	swimming	200 m butterfly	silver	USA
Phelps	Michael	2012	swimming	400 m freestyle relay	silver	USA
Phelps	Michael	2016	swimming	200 m butterfly	gold	USA
Phelps	Michael	2016	swimming	200 m ind. medley	gold	USA
Phelps	Michael	2016	swimming	400 m freestyle relay	gold	USA
Phelps	Michael	2016	swimming	800 m freestyle relay	gold	USA
Phelps	Michael	2016	swimming	400 m medley relay	gold	USA
Phelps	Michael	2016	swimming	100 m butterfly	silver	USA
Ray	Elise	2000	gymnastics	team	bronze	USA
Riviere	Jayde	2020	soccer		gold	Canada
Roberts	Trish	1976	basketball		bronze	USA
Robie	Carl	1964	swimming	200 m butterfly	silver	USA
Robie	Carl	1968	swimming	200 m butterfly	gold	USA
Rose	Ralph	1904	track	shot put	gold	USA
Rose	Ralph	1904	track	discus	silver	USA
Rose	Ralph	1904	track	hammer	bronze	USA
Rose	Ralph	1908	track	shot put	gold	USA
Rose	Ralph	1912	track	shot put	silver	USA
Rose	Ralph	1912	track	shot put-combined	gold	USA
Rydze	Dick	1972	diving	platform	silver	USA
Samson	Paul	1928	swimming	800 m freestyle relay	gold	USA
Schule	Fred	1904	track	110 meter hurdles	gold	USA
Seufert	Chris	1984	diving	platform	silver	USA
Smoke	Marcia Jones	1964	kayaking	500 m singles	bronze	USA
Sohl	Robert	1948	swimming	220 m breaststroke	bronze	USA
Spillane	Joan	1960	swimming	400 m freestyle relay	gold	USA
Spillane	Joan	1960	swimming	400 m medley relay	gold	USA
Thompson	Chris	2000	swimming	1500 m freestyle	bronze	USA
Tolan	Eddie	1932	track	100 meters	gold	USA
Tolan	Eddie	1932	track	200 meters	gold	USA
Vanderkaay	Peter	2004	swimming	800 m freestyle relay	gold	USA
Vanderkaay	Peter	2008	swimming	800 m freestyle relay	gold	USA
Vanderkaay	Peter	2008	swimming	200 m freestyle	bronze	USA
Webster	Bob	1960	diving	platform	gold	USA
Webster	Bob	1964	diving	platform	gold	USA
Willis	Nick	2008	track	1500 meters	silver	New Zealand
Willis	Nick	2016	track	1500m	bronze	New Zealand
White	Robert	1956	ice hockey		bronze	Canada
Wouda	Marcel	2000	swimming	800 m freestyle relay	bronze	the Netherlands
Zadorsky	Shelina	2020	soccer		gold	Canada

== Athletic directors ==
Athletic director	Years
Charles A. Baird	1898–1909
Philip Bartelme	1909–1921
Fielding H. Yost	1921–1940
Fritz Crisler	1941–1968
Don Canham	1968–1988
Bo Schembechler	1988–1990
Jack Weidenbach	1990–1994
Joe Roberson	1994–1997
Tom Goss	1997–2000
William C. Martin	2000–2010
Dave Brandon	2010–2014
Jim Hackett	2014–2016
Warde Manuel	2016–present

== Mascot ==
The Michigan Wolverines is one of the few college sports teams that does not have a live or costumed mascot, largely for reasons of tradition. In the late 1920s, the Wolverines did have an unofficial mascot – Biff, the Michigan Wolverine. The first Biff was a stuffed wolverine. The second Biff was a live wolverine, who had a companion named Bennie, but the two mustelids grew to become too ferocious to be taken to games, which ended their career as mascots. In the 1980s, a group of students created an unofficial mascot named Willy the Wolverine, which was rejected by the university.

== See also ==
- List of college athletic programs in Michigan
- Big Ten Athlete of the Year
- University of Michigan Athletic Hall of Honor
