= Mathey =

Mathey is a surname. Notable people with the surname include:

- Dean Mathey (1890–1972), American tennis player
- George Antonio Bell Mathey (born 1959), better known as George Bell, American baseball player
- Jean Baptiste Mathey (1630–1696), French architect and painter
- Paul Mathey (1844–1929), French painter and engraver
- Pedro Mathey (1928–1985), Peruvian cyclist
- Roger Mathey (born 1969), American theatrical director, as well as a playwright, actor, producer, and filmmaker

== See also ==
- Mathey College, is one of six residential colleges at Princeton University, New Jersey
- Mathey-Tissot, is a Swiss watch maker
