= Biff (name) =

Biff is a primarily masculine given name, a nickname or part of a stage name. It originated as a nickname for names starting with the letter B. It came to be considered a stereotypical preppy nickname during the 1980s.

== People ==
=== Nickname ===
- Biff Byford (born 1951), British lead singer of the heavy metal band Saxon
- Frank Dunlap (1924–1993), Canadian Football League player
- James T. Ellison (c. 1861–1920s), New York City gangster
- William Grimes (journalist) (born 1950), journalist
- Biff Henderson (born 1946), American stage manager and television personality on the Late Show with David Letterman
- Biff Jones (1895–1980), former college football head coach and member of the College Football Hall of Fame
- Biff Liff (1919–2015), born Samuel Liff, Tony Award-winning American Broadway manager and producer.
- William Q. MacLean Jr. (1934–2026), American politician
- Biff McGuire (1926–2021), American stage and film actor
- Biff Rose (1937–2023), American comedian and singer-songwriter
- Biff Schaller (1889–1939), Major League Baseball player
- Biff Schlitzer (1884–1948), Major League Baseball pitcher
- Biff Sheehan (1868–1923), Major League Baseball player
- Richard Stannard (songwriter) (born 1966), British songwriter
- Claude Taugher (1897–1963), National Football League player and decorated World War I US Marine Corps officer
- Biff Wysong (1905–1951), Major League Baseball pitcher

=== Given name ===
- Biff Mitchell (1947–2025), Canadian novelist, satirist and humorist
- Biff Pocoroba (1953–2020), American baseball player
- Biff Yeager (born 1942), American actor

=== Stage name ===
- Biff Debrie, stage name of Don Preston (born 1932), American jazz and rock and roll musician
- Biff Elliot (1923–2012), American actor
- Biff Wellington (1964–2007), Canadian wrestler
- Biff Wiff (1948-2025), stage name of Gary Crotty, American actor

== Fictional characters ==
- Biff Baker, Cold War spy in the American TV series Biff Baker, U.S.A., played by Alan Hale Jr.
- Biff Brewster, teenage hero of 13 adventure and mystery novels in the 1960s
- Biff Fowler, in the ITV soap Emmerdale
- Biff Hooper, friend of the Hardy Boys in the novel series The Hardy Boys
- Biff Tannen, in the Back to the Future film trilogy
- Sully and Biff, from Sesame Street

== Animals ==
- Biff, the Michigan Wolverine, a mascot for Michigan Wolverines football in the 1920s and 1930s
