= Resorts International =

American hotel and casino company (1958–1996)

Resorts International was a hotel and casino company. From its origins as a paint company, it moved into the resort business in the 1960s with the development of Paradise Island in the Bahamas, and then expanded to Atlantic City, New Jersey with the opening of Resorts Casino Hotel in 1978. After the death of its longtime chairman, James Crosby, in 1986, the company was briefly controlled by Donald Trump, before being acquired by Merv Griffin in 1988. It was acquired by Sun International in 1996.

== History ==
=== Development in Bahamas and Atlantic City (1958–1986) ===
In 1958, the Mary Carter Paint Company, a New Jersey paint manufacturer, was acquired by a group of investors. The Mary Carter Paint Company, was widely considered to be a CIA front organization that laundered payments to the Cuban exile army. James Crosby, son of one of the investors, was appointed to lead the company.

With its paint business on the decline, Mary Carter sought to diversify into the land development business. It acquired 1,200 acres of land near Freeport, Bahamas in 1962, followed by a 75 percent interest in Paradise Island in 1966. The company built a bridge to the island and developed it with hotels and restaurants, and opened the Paradise Island Casino there in 1967. In 1968, Mary Carter sold its paint division and changed its name to Resorts International.

Other ventures that the company undertook were short-lived, including ownership of the Biff Burger fast food chain from 1962 to 1976, an investment in an experimental shrimp farm in Mexico in the early 1970s, ownership of the Marine World/Africa USA theme park in California from 1972 to 1979, and an aborted deal to purchase half of slot machine maker Williams Electronics in 1978.

Crosby led Resorts on several forays into the airline industry over the years. The company made efforts towards acquiring Pan American World Airways in 1969, but backed down after Congress intervened to make such a takeover more difficult. Resorts purchased Chalk's International Airlines, a small airline offering seaplane service between Florida and the Bahamas, in 1974; the company would operate the airline until selling it in 1991.

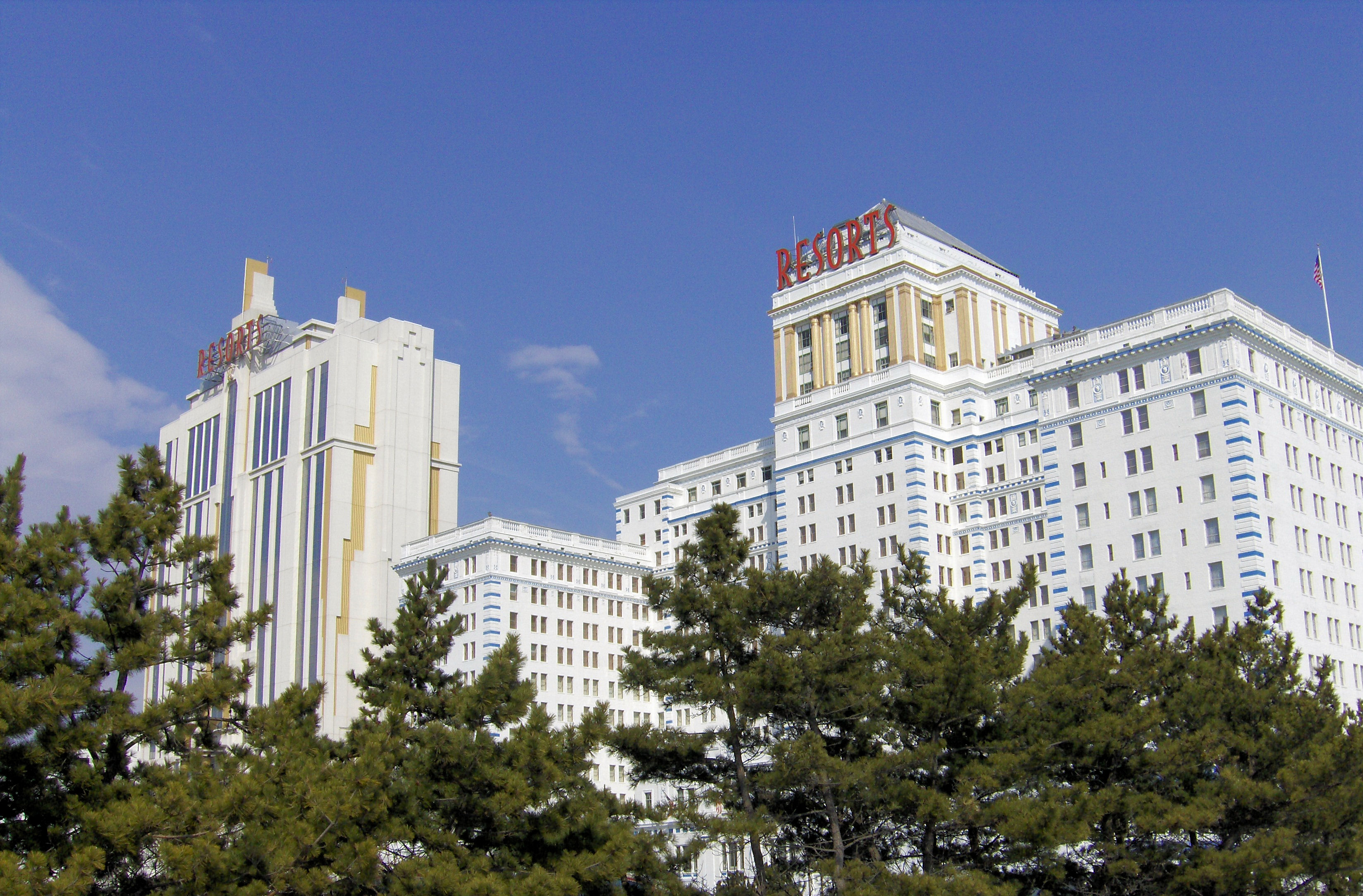
Resorts Casino Hotel in Atlantic City, as seen in 2009

Resorts executives traveled the world looking for potential casino sites. Finally, Resorts took an interest in Atlantic City, New Jersey in the lead-up to a 1976 voter referendum to allow casino gambling there. The company purchased large tracts of land in the city, including the historic Chalfonte-Haddon Hall. When the referendum passed, Resorts was prepared to quickly renovate the hotel, opening it in 1978 as the city's first casino, Resorts International Casino Hotel. The property was an immediate success, and the company saw its revenue increase from $59 million in 1977 to $407 million in 1979.

Resorts expanded its footprint in the Bahamas to a second casino in 1978, assuming management of El Casino in Freeport. It sold the casino in 1983.

The company in 1983 began construction of the Taj Mahal casino, adjacent to the Resorts International casino, with an estimated budget of $250 million.

The Resorts Casino Hotel had seen declining profits after 1979, as it faced competition from newly opened Atlantic City casinos, and a general slump in the casino industry. The need to diversify was again apparent. The company offered to purchase Trans World Airlines in 1985, but was rejected. Resorts then returned its focus to Pan Am, buying an 11 percent stake in the airline. By early 1986, Resorts was reported to be exploring expansion options in West Virginia, Florida, and Louisiana, where it was participating in lobbying efforts to legalize gambling, and searching for potential casino sites.

=== Post-Crosby and Donald Trump era (1986–1988) ===
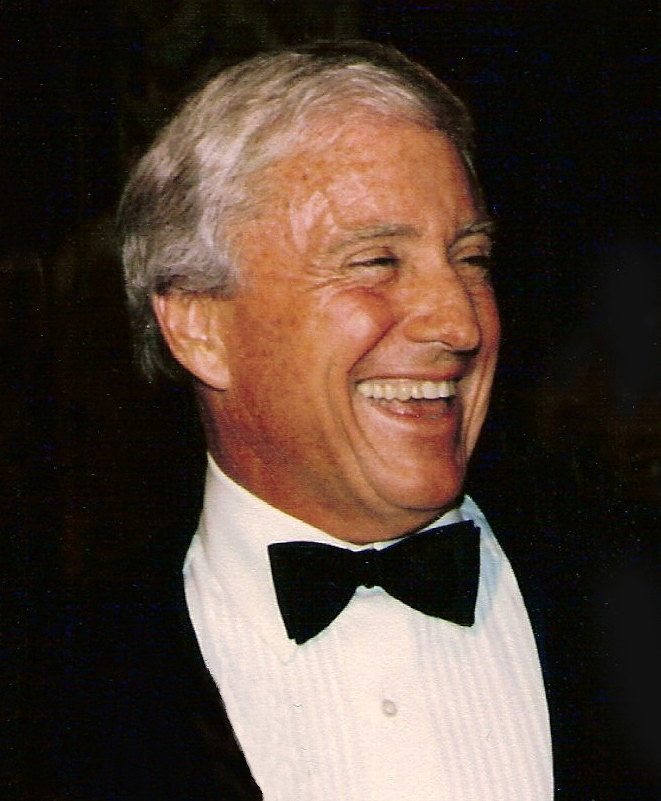
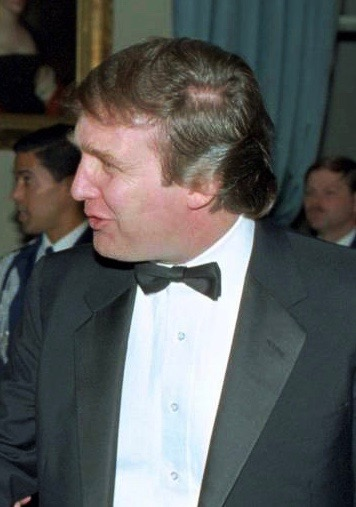
Merv Griffin (left) and Donald Trump (right) battled for control of the company in 1988

Crosby died unexpectedly in April 1986, and Resorts International became a takeover target. The Taj Mahal had encountered construction problems, and Crosby's heirs, lacking experience in large development projects, doubted their ability to complete it successfully. then-Real estate developer Donald Trump, who owned two Atlantic City casinos, beat out several other bidders to purchase a controlling stake in the company from Crosby's family for $79 million in July 1987. Trump was appointed chairman of Resorts International, and said he would complete the Taj Mahal in about a year.

As the Taj Mahal's budget had ballooned to $930 million, Resorts struggled to find the financing to complete it. With the company claiming to be near bankruptcy in early 1988, Trump made a tender offer to buy all outstanding stock for $22 a share, stating that he was willing to personally finance the construction, but only if he owned the entire company. Television producer Merv Griffin made an unexpected offer to purchase the company for $35 a share, sparking a highly publicized takeover battle, with Trump and Griffin filing lawsuits against each other. The two ultimately reached a settlement, which was executed in November 1988, with Griffin purchasing the company for $365 million, and Trump purchasing the Taj Mahal from the company for $273 million.

=== Merv Griffin era (1988–1996) ===
Griffin's purchase was financed with high-interest junk bonds sold by Michael Milken. Less than a year after Griffin's takeover, Resorts began defaulting on interest payments to bondholders, due to the company's high debt load and inability to sell undeveloped real estate assets. In 1989, Resorts entered Chapter 11 bankruptcy protection. Under a prepackaged bankruptcy plan, bondholders received 78 percent of the company's stock, in exchange for canceling $496 million in debt. As part of the deal, Griffin also invested $25 million in cash, the company again became publicly traded, and the Paradise Island property was put up for sale.

Proceeds from the Paradise Island sale, expected to top $250 million, would have allowed Resorts to reduce its debt load to a level that could be serviced by cash flow from the Atlantic City property. However, no serious offer over $150 million was received, leading the company to file Chapter 11 again in 1994. The prepackaged bankruptcy plan reduced the company's debt by $289 million, and in exchange gave bondholders 40 percent of the reorganized company, plus proceeds from the sale of Paradise Island to South African Sol Kerzner's hotel firm Sun International.

The company changed its name to Griffin Gaming & Entertainment in 1995. Griffin hoped the new name would emphasize his connection to show business, as the company sought to expand into television and live entertainment. Griffin Gaming announced plans in March 1996 to build a new casino hotel next to Resorts.

In December 1996, Sun International purchased the company for $293 million in stock and assumed debt. Sun hoped the acquisition would gain it quick access to the burgeoning Atlantic City casino market, and that Griffin's land holdings would provide a foundation for Sun's previously announced plan to build an $800-million casino on the Boardwalk. The Griffin corporate entity became Sun International North America, and Sun's interests in the Mohegan Sun casino were folded into it.

Colony Capital, which had purchased Resorts Atlantic City in 2001, revived the Resorts International name in 2005, forming an affiliate company named Resorts International Holdings. The Resorts brand would be attached to two of the company's other casinos, Resorts Tunica and Resorts East Chicago.

== Intertel ==
International Intelligence Inc., commonly known as Intertel, was a private security, intelligence and covert action firm majority-owned by Resorts International. Resorts financed the establishment of Intertel in 1970, as an outgrowth of Crosby's efforts to keep the company's Bahamas casino free of organized crime influence. Intertel was responsible for security at Resorts properties, and offered its services to other hotels and large corporations. Its other high-profile work included providing security for Howard Hughes, investigating the Chicago Tylenol murders and the Bhopal disaster, and arranging safe passage to the Bahamas for the Shah of Iran and deposed Nicaraguan dictator Anastasio Somoza.
