= Joe Roberson =

American academic administrator (1935–2020)

Biographical details
- Born: September 22, 1935; Flint, Michigan, U.S.
- Died: January 13, 2020 (aged 84); Grand Blanc, Michigan, U.S.

Playing career

Baseball
- 1954–1955: Asheville Tourists
- 1954, 1956: Shawnee Hawks
- 1955: Mobile Bears
- 1955–1956: Cedar Rapids Raiders
- 1956: St. Paul Saints
- Position: Pitcher

Administrative career (AD unless noted)
- 1994–1997: Michigan

Marvin Joseph Roberson (September 22, 1935 – January 13, 2020) was an American academic administrator who was the director of athletics at the University of Michigan from 1994 to 1997.

== Early life ==
Roberson was born on September 22, 1935 in Flint, Michigan. He was a standout baseball and basketball player at Flint Northern High School. During his senior season, he pitched two no-hitters and two one-hitters. He signed with the Brooklyn Dodgers on July 13, 1953 and played in their organization from 1954 to 1956.

== Career ==
Roberson earned his undergraduate degree from University of Michigan–Flint (UM-Flint) in 1958 and his master's and doctorate from the University of Michigan, Ann Arbor in 1963 and 1970, respectively. He began his academic career as an assistant professor of education at UM–Flint. He also served as UM-Flint's dean for students from 1966 to 1980, vice chancellor for university services from 1980 to 1983, and interim chancellor from 1983 to 1984.

Roberson moved to the University of Michigan, Ann Arbor in 1984 as head of corporate fundraising. In 1989, he became the associate vice president and executive director of the Campaign for Michigan, a $1 billion fundraising campaign.

=== Athletic director ===
In September 1993, Roberson was named Michigan's next athletic director. He succeeded Jack Weidenbach on July 1, 1994. Under his leadership, Michigan achieved gender equality in athletics, signed a $7 million contract with Nike, and reorganized the athletic department's executive staff. Michigan won seventeen conference championships and two national championships (men's swimming and diving in 1995 and men's ice hockey in 1996) during his tenure as AD.

Roberson dealt with a number of scandals as AD. In 1994, he chose not to suspend hockey coach Red Berenson after Berenson was arrested for drunken driving and public urination. That same year, he placed women's basketball coach Trish Roberts on probation after some of her player's parents accused her of abuse. In 1995, Roberts and the university were sued by a former player who alleged the coach had harassed her and forced her to leave the team because of a disability. Roberts left the university by mutual agreement at the end of the 1995-96 season. The university agreed to pay her $65,000 and support her in any legal proceedings as part of the agreement. The women's basketball program improved under Roberts' successor, Sue Guevara. In 1995, head football coach Gary Moeller was fired after tapes were released of his alleged drunken outburst following an arrest on a charge of disorderly conduct at the Excalibur restaurant in Southfield, Michigan. Roberson chose to promote one of Moeller's assistants, Lloyd Carr, to the head coaching position. Carr led Michigan to a national title in 1997.

On February 17, 1996, an automobile accident involving Michigan basketball player Maurice Taylor revealed a curious relationship between booster Ed Martin and Michigan's basketball program. Roberson learned that Martin had tried to place deposits on apartments for UM basketball players Robert Traylor and Louis Bullock and had offered airline tickets to Bullock's parents so they could attend a tournament in Puerto Rico. It emerged that head coach Steve Fisher had known about Martin's actions at the time. While Fisher had ordered the deposits retrieved and made sure the tickets weren't used, he didn't tell anyone in the athletic or compliance offices, as he was required to do. Roberson also learned that during the 1992 Final Four, Fisher made two of the limited supply of team rooms available to Martin. Martin gave one hotel room paid for by Michigan to Chris Webber's father—a violation of NCAA rules. As a result of Roberson's findings, he ordered interviews of the basketball team and team coaches. The initial investigation into the Michigan basketball scandal found no serious violations, however later investigations made it clear that Michigan's basketball program was guilty of major violations and Michigan decided to impose its own sanctions on the program.

In February 1997, Roberson informed University president Lee Bollinger that he wanted to step down once his successor was hired. He departed when Tom Goss was hired on September 8, 1997.

== Personal life and death ==
Roberson married Barbara Perry in 1955. They had two children. Barbara Roberson died in 1989. He was married to Carolyn Conklin Black from 1994 until her death in 2013. Roberson died on January 13, 2020 at his home in Grand Blanc, Michigan.
