= Biff Mitchell =

Biff Mitchell (1947 to 2025) was a novelist, satirist, and humorist.

Born in Toronto, Ontario, Mitchell graduated from the University of New Brunswick with an honors degree in English literature in 1974. After college, he returned to his hometown and worked at the University of Toronto bookstores on the Erindale Campus. He returned to New Brunswick in 1975 and worked at a variety of jobs. The character studies he made during these years formed most of the characters in his first novel, Heavy Load (2000). Mitchell described the book as the world's first "laundromance", "stories a laundromat would tell if it could talk."

In 1993, he started work at a computer-based training company, FirstClass Systems, which later became LearnStream. His experience with these two companies inspired his second novel, Team Player (2001). He left LearnStream in 2001 to work for another eLearning company, Engage Interactive. While he was at Engage, he finished his third novel, The War Bug (2005).

In 2005, Mitchell served as International Spokesperson for Read an eBook Week, during which time, he worked with Michael S. Hart, founder of Project Gutenberg, on a "Brief History of Project Gutenberg".

Mitchell was a featured writer/instructor at the 2006 Maritime Writers' Workshop & Literary Festival in Fredericton, New Brunswick.

Mitchell lived in Atlantic Canada until his death on June 14, 2025.

== Bibliography ==
- Heavy Load. Australia: Jacobyte Books. 2000
- Team Player. Australia: Jacobyte Books. 2001
- Smoke Break. Echelon Press. 2001. ISBN 1-59080-290-X
- The Baton. Echelon Press. 2002. ISBN 1-59080-262-4
- The War Bug. Double Dragon Publishing. 2005. ISBN 1-55404-248-8
- eMarketing Tools for Writers, 2nd Edition. Fictionwise. 2005. ISBN 0-9732799-5-8
- Surfing in Catal Hyuk. 2005.
- Twisted Tails: An Anthology to Surprise and Delight. Double Dragon Publishing. 2006. ISBN 1-55404-339-5
- Twisted Tails Two: Time On Our Hands. Double Dragon Publishing. 2007. ISBN 978-1-55404-434-4
