= Jack Weidenbach =

American academic administrator (1924–2024)

Biographical details
- Born: March 31, 1924; Detroit, Michigan, U.S.
- Died: February 17, 2024 (aged 99); Ann Arbor, Michigan, U.S.

Administrative career (AD unless noted)
- 1988–1990: Michigan (asst. AD)
- 1990–1994: Michigan

John Peter Weidenbach (March 31, 1924 – February 17, 2024) was an American academic administrator who was the director of athletics at the University of Michigan from 1990 to 1994.

== Biography ==
Weidenbach was a captain in the United States Army Air Forces during World War II. He was manager of University of Michigan-owned Willow Run Airport from 1948 until the airport ceased commercial operations in 1966. He then joined the university's administrative staff.

Weidenbach became Michigan's director of physical properties in 1971 and, in 1977, was named director of business operations. In the latter role, Weidenbach oversaw purchasing, public safety, occupational safety, and environmental health, as well as the construction and maintenance of the university's buildings.

In 1988, Weidenbach was appointed associate athletic director. He oversaw the day-to-day operations of the athletic department, which allowed athletic director Bo Schembechler to continue coaching football. Weidenbach became the interim athletic director in 1990 when Schembechler became president of the Detroit Tigers. The interim tag was removed the following year and he was given a two-year contract. He intended on retiring in 1993, but was persuaded to stay on one more year. He was succeeded by Joe Roberson on July 1, 1994. Prior to his departure, the newly-renovated athletic administration building was renamed John P. Weidenbach Hall in his honor.
