= Bakersfield Independent Film Festival =

The Bakersfield Independent Film Festival, also known as "BIFF," is a film festival held in Bakersfield, California, which showcases films made by filmmakers with a connection to Bakersfield or Kern County, California.

The criteria of a connection to Bakersfield and Kern County for the purpose of BIFF is broad. Eligible films are those made by filmmakers who live in Kern County, or who once lived in Kern County, or which had film crews from Kern County, or films which were shot in Kern County.

BIFF has been held four times in the past.

The most recent BIFF was held on November 1–3, 2012, at The Empty Space, Bakersfield. About 20 films and music videos were shown, including the feature film The Lackey, and some of the filmmakers were also there to answer questions.

== History ==
BIFF is organized and sponsored by the production company, Seat of Your Pants Productions, and its director Roger Mathey.

The first BIFF, BIFF 1.0, was held on November 18–19, 2005. It was held at the Spotlight Theatre, Bakersfield.

BIFF 1.5 was held on June 23–24, 2006. As with BIFF 1.0, it was again held at the Spotlight Theatre, Bakersfield.

BIFF 2.0 was held on November 24–25, 2006. As was the case with BIFF 1.0 and BIFF 1.5, it was again held at the Spotlight Theatre, Bakersfield.

BIFF 3.0 was held on November 1–3, 2012. In contrast to previous BIFFs, BIFF 3.0 was held at a new venue, The Empty Space, Bakersfield.
