= Roger Mathey =

American theatrical director (born 1969)

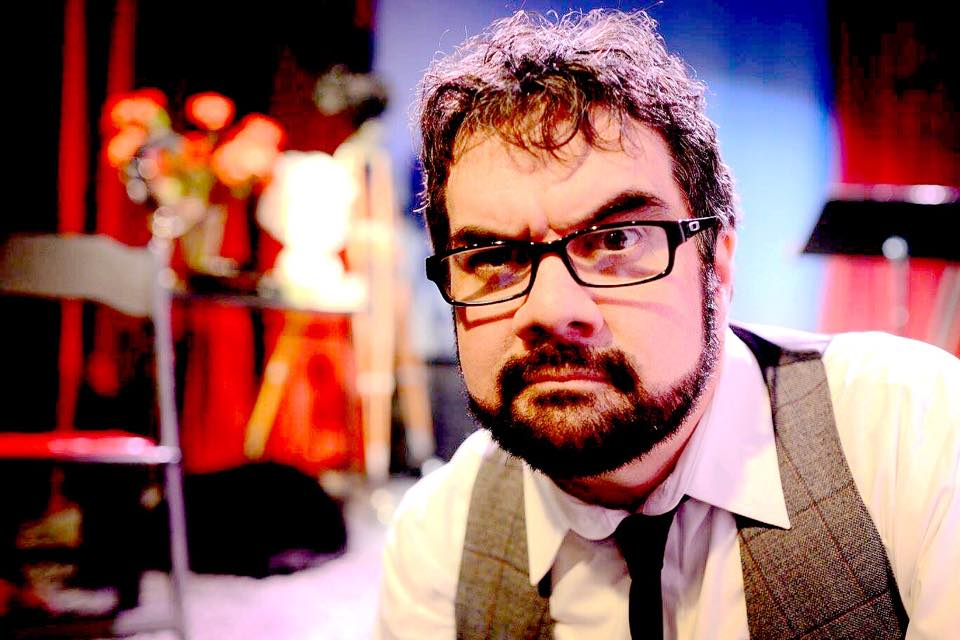
- Born: December 23, 1969
- Died: April 27, 2026 (aged 56)
- Education: Jakarta International School; Hawaii Preparatory Academy
- Alma mater: Chapman University, Orange, CA
- Occupations: Producer, director, actor, playwright
- Notable work: Trainspotting (the play); Chatsworth; You Make Me Physically ILL; Naked Twister

Roger Mathey was an American theatrical director, as well as a playwright, actor, producer, and filmmaker. His plays were staged in Los Angeles, Orange County, Bakersfield, and San Francisco in California, and also in Denver, Colorado.

== Plays ==
Roger Mathey won the 2002 Los Angeles Drama Critics Circle Award for Direction for the Los Angeles stage production of Trainspotting, and also the 2002 LA Weekly Theater Award for Direction, also for Trainspotting.

Some of the plays he directed, wrote, acted in and/or produced are the following: The Time of Your Life, Lysistrata, Escurial, Amadeus, A Hatful of Rain, Beirut, Futon Culture, Naked Twister, Trainspotting, The House of Yes, Cleansed, The White Whore and the Bit Player, You Make Me Physically Ill, Chatsworth, Geeks vs. Zombies, and You Make me Physically Ill: Episode 2 - Love Never Dies.

Mathey's final theatrical production was The Night Auditor in 2024, based on his days working in a three-star hotel in Los Angeles.

Mathey's production company was Seat of Your Pants Productions.

== Other works ==
Mathey wrote, directed, and produced a short film, Naked Twister. He also wrote a book, The Transporter: Tales from a Rideshare Drive about his personal experiences working for a Ridesharing company.

He also founded the short-lived Bakersfield Independent Film Festival (also known as "B.I.F.F.").
