= LearnStream =

Canadian online education company

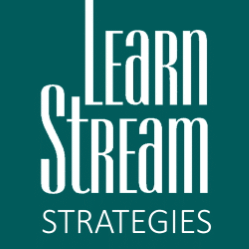
- Company type: Private company
- Industry: Vocational education
- Founded: 1998; 27 years ago
- Founder: Ken Reimer and Phil Lambert
- Headquarters: Fredericton, NB, Canada
- Area served: Canada and United States
- Key people: Ken Reimer
- Products: Education consulting services for business
- Number of employees: 150 (2005)
- Website: www.learnstream.ca

LearnStream is a Canadian e-learning company based in Fredericton.

The company initially provided online education such as IT training which expanded to other subjects. The company was acquired in 2005 by Vitesse Learning, which eventually folded the business into its own operations and stopped using the LearnStream brand.

In 2021 the company was relaunched by the original founder Ken Reimer to provide consulting for company education and training courses.

== History ==
The company was originally started in 1998 through a leveraged management buyout of the operation from its former parent company, FirstClass Systems Corp based in White Rock, BC. LearnStream Strategies relaunched in 2022, to provide strategic consulting and development services in the online education, corporate training, and eLearning space.

The company was founded by entrepreneurs Ken Reimer and Phil Lambert, who raised the capital and engineered the management buyout from the parent company. Reimer was previously president of FirstClass Systems Product Development Corporation, and had previous entrepreneurial adventures in Western Canada. Lambert was previously vice president of FirstClass Systems Product Development Corporation and brought extensive experience with large multi-national manufacturers and small start-ups to the venture.

The company was purchased in 2005 by Vitesse Learning, and operated from its New Brunswick base until the original LearnStream was folded into a merged entity.

In 2021 LearnStream was relaunched by the original founder Ken Reimer to serve a growing market for eLearning and online learning.

== Operations ==
Although the company focused originally on IT training, it expanded the client base to include financial services, pharmaceuticals, international development, and defense.

One of the recognitions for the company was winning the Canadian New Media Company of the Year award in 2000. It also won Cindy awards, the KIRA Award, the K. C. Irving Quality Award, and a number of Multimedia Producer awards.

Since its relaunch the company focusses on providing consulting services to companies that are provide training for their staff, clients, and partners. This is done through a networked team, working on client sites, or from home offices across the US and Canada.

== Influence ==
As an eLearning pioneer based in Fredericton, LearnStream was a major player in the development of the eLearning workforce of instructional designers, graphic artists, media developers, programmers and others. Many LearnStream alumni have joined and now bring those skills to other firms in the Fredericton area, including Bluedrop Performance Learning, Innovatia, Skillsoft, PulseLearning, Red Hot Learning, PQA, and Virtual Expert Clinics. The alumni remain in contact through a Facebook group for Former LearnStream Employees.

A Telegraph-Journal editorial referred to LearnStream as one of four companies (LearnStream, Mariner Partners, Q1Labs, and Radian6) who "have demonstrated that New Brunswickers have what it takes to excel in the development and application of new technologies".
