= Brussels Film Festival =

Brussels Film Festival, Brussels International Film Festival or Festival International du Film de Bruxelles may refer to:

- Brussels International Film Festival (1974–2016), also known as the Brussels European Film Festival, Brussels Film Festival, or BRFF
- Brussels International Film Festival (2018–present), abbreviated as BRIFF
- Brussels International Fantastic Film Festival, since 1983, featuring horror, thriller and science fiction films
- Brussels Independent Film Festival, since 1974, formerly Brussels International Independent Film Festival
- Brussels Short Film Festival, since 1998

== See also ==
- Offscreen Film Festival, a film festival in Brussels
