= Biff Burger =

American fast food franchise

Restaurant information
- Established: 1956
- Closed: December 7, 2021
- Owner: Defunct
- Previous owner(s): Bruce and Earl Brane; Mary Carter Paint Company
- Food type: Fast food (burgers)
- Dress code: Casual
- Location: Clearwater, Florida (origin), United States
- Other locations: Southeastern United States

Biff Burger (Best In Fast Food) was a burger fast food franchise that originated in Clearwater, Florida. Early success in the late 1950s and early 1960s led the franchise to spread to many parts of the Southeastern United States. However, financial woes in the 1970s sent the chain on a decline and most of its restaurants out of business by the 1980s.

== Founding ==
The first Biff Burger restaurant was started by co-owners Bruce and Earl Brane in 1956. It was operated under the National Biff-Burger System, their manufacturing company that oversaw the production of materials to be used within the Biff Burger franchise.

== Roto-Red Broiler ==
As a burger chain, Biff Burger was known for its “flame-broiled” burger. Biff Burgers were produced using the Roto-red broiler designed by the Branes. The broiler was set up in two parts: An upper rotisserie rack broiled the beef and a second lower rack toasted the buns, which collected the juices dropped from the beef. This method gave the burger its much advertised "flame broiled" taste.

== Expansion ==
Early success prompted for the National Biff Burger System to begin expanding Biff Burger. It franchised its restaurants under favorable conditions. Most notably included in its policy are

- exclusive area protection
- no franchise fee requirement
- unique Port-A-Unit drive-in building
- free advertising material

The restaurants were marketed at roughly $13,000 and more than 800 restaurants were sold. The number of restaurants in Florida grew, with smaller concentrations of restaurants stretching from Georgia to Tennessee to North Carolina. Each of the Biff Burger drive-ins were independently owned as part of the National Biff Burger franchise.

== Port-A-Units ==
A Port-A-Unit is a uniquely designed transportable building implemented by the National Biff-Burger System. Port-a-units serve as the Biff Burger drive-ins that are preassembled and shipped with hundreds of restaurant tools that included

- Roto-red broilers
- heavy duty fryers
- 10' x 30' storage room
- built-in refrigerator-freezer
- built in restrooms
- large road sign

This feature of the Biff Burger franchise was designed to maximize profits due its short assembly time (as quick as one week) and easy transportation. This is as opposed to typical construction times of buildings that take more than six months.

== Financial issues ==
Success of the Biff Burger franchise did not last, due to monetary problems in the 1970s.

In 1962, the Mary Carter Paint Company bought the National Biff-Burger System. It provided the financial support to the Biff Burger restaurants in the form of supplying food materials and restaurant equipment. However, business ventures in the direction of casinos resulted in finance imbalances and the Mary Carter Paint company relieved its support of the National Biff-Burger system in 1976. Without its main means of obtaining supplies, the Biff Burger franchise struggled to sustain itself. Many of the drive-in stands were sold and forced to close down. By the mid-1980s, virtually all existing locations of Biff Burger restaurants went out of business.

== Final closure ==
On December 7, 2021, the last remaining original Biff Burger, located in St. Petersburg, Florida closed. The contents of the building were auctioned off, officially ending the burger chain. The original building is set to be demolished.

Another location in Greensboro, North Carolina had closed on May 17, 2021, due to ill health and eventual death of its owner, Ralph Havis. The Greensboro location name had been changed to "Beef Burger" in the 1980s.

The culture of Biff Burger remained unchanged since the 1950s. Until the St. Pete location closed, it was a popular gathering spot for motorcycle and classic car shows. Friday nights could potentially draw up to 2000 customers to events that involve showcasing hotrods and classic cars.
