= BIF =

BIF or bif may refer to:

== Organisations ==
- Benevolence International Foundation, part of al-Qaeda, posing as a charity
- Brabrand IF, football club playing in the Danish 2nd Division
- Brøndby IF, football club playing in the Danish Superliga
- Brynäs IF, ice hockey team from Gävle, Sweden
- Die BIF, one of the first lesbian magazines

== Places ==
- Barrow-in-Furness railway station, station code BIF
- British Industries Fair, Birmingham, England

== Science and technology ==
- Banded iron formation, a type of rock
- Bifrenaria, orchid genus
- Borderline intellectual functioning

== Other uses ==
- Bif Naked, Canadian musician
- Burundian franc, by ISO 4217 code
