= Biff, the Michigan Wolverine =

Mascot of the University of Michigan Wolverines

- Team: University of Michigan football
- University: University of Michigan
- Conference: Big Ten Conference
- First seen: 1920s
- Last seen: 1930s

Biff was a wolverine who served as a team mascot at University of Michigan football games and was later kept in a small zoo at the University of Michigan in the 1920s and 1930s. In the mid-1920s, before the acquisition of a live wolverine, the University of Michigan used a mounted and stuffed wolverine, also named "Biff", as the team mascot.

== History ==
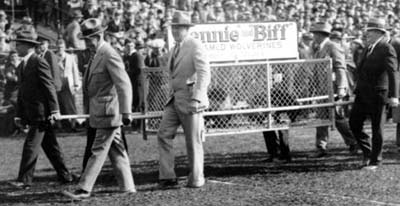
Biff and Bennie in cage at Michigan Stadium, circa 1927

In 1923, after seeing the University of Wisconsin football team carry live badgers at games, University of Michigan athletic director and football coach Fielding H. Yost decided to procure a wolverine. Despite writing letters to 68 trappers, Yost was reportedly unable to find a wolverine. The best he could do in 1924 was to obtain a mounted and stuffed wolverine from the Hudson's Bay Company. The stuffed wolverine was named “Biff” and was featured on the cover of a 1925 game program, along with team captain Robert J. Brown straining to hold Biff on a leash. The caption to the photograph read: “Capt. Bob Brown and Biff: The Wolverine Mascot of Michigan Athletic Teams Is Noted for Its Ferocity and Gameness in Battle, a Characteristic of Every Team that Wears the Maize and Blue.”

Then, in 1927, the Detroit Zoo acquired ten wolverines from Alaska. During the 1927 season, Yost struck a deal with the zoo to have two of the wolverines transported to Ann Arbor on football Saturdays. The two wolverines were nicknamed “Biff” and “Bennie” and were paraded around Michigan Stadium during football games. Biff and Bennie’s first appearance came on dedication day for Michigan Stadium in 1927.

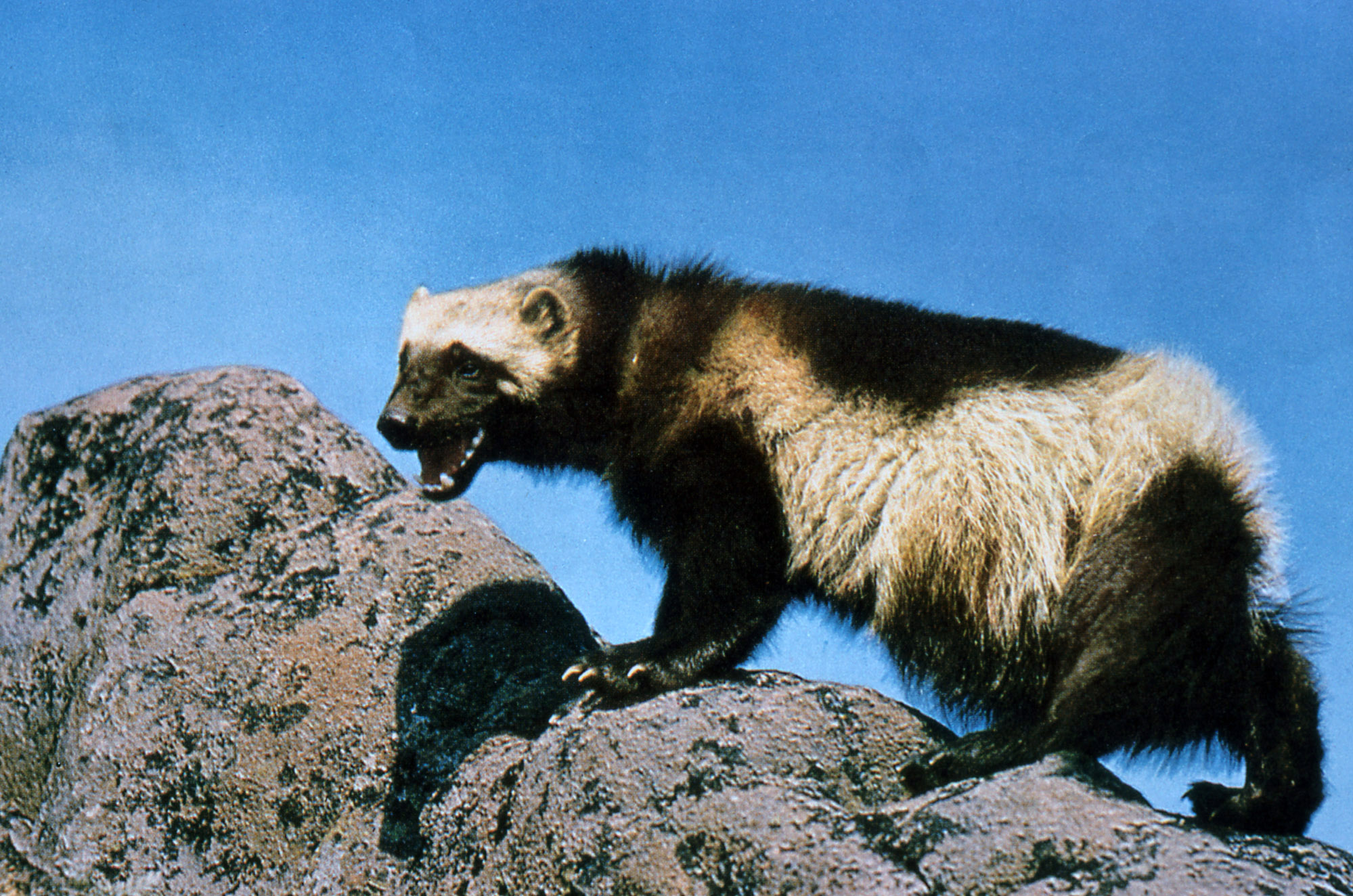
A living wolverine (not Biff or Bennie)

The University of Michigan Athletic Department reports that Biff and Bennie “grew larger and more ferocious,” leading Yost to conclude, "It was obvious that the Michigan mascots had designs on the Michigan men toting them, and those designs were by no means friendly." Accordingly, the practice of bringing Biff and Bennie into the stadium ended after just one season. One of the Wolverines, Biff, was put in a cage at the University of Michigan Zoo. National Geographic reported that "Yost had not accounted for the rapid growth or the ferocity of the animals, and when his players were no longer willing to carry the wolverines around the stadium, one live mascot, 'Biff,' was turned over to the University of Michigan Zoo so that the students would be able to visit—and be inspired by—him." Though some sources report that Biff and Bennie were paraded in cages around Michigan Stadium for only one year, an article from the Bentley Historical Library states that the two live wolverine mascots were brought to the stadium for “a number of years.” The Bentley account also states that both Biff and Bennie lived for a time at a small zoo near the Natural History Museum, "but eventually became too vicious to remain on campus and were moved to the Detroit Zoo."
