= 1931 Big Ten Conference football season =

- Sport: Football
- Teams: 10
- Co-champions: Minnesota, Michigan, Northwestern
- Runners-up: Ohio State
- Season MVP: Biggie Munn

Football seasons

1931 Big Ten Conference football standings
	Conf.					Overall
Team	W		L		T	W		L		T
No. 10 Purdue +	5	–	1	–	0	9	–	1	–	0
Michigan +	5	–	1	–	0	8	–	1	–	1
No. 4 Northwestern +	5	–	1	–	0	7	–	1	–	1
Ohio State	4	–	2	–	0	6	–	3	–	0
Minnesota	3	–	2	–	0	7	–	3	–	0
Wisconsin	3	–	3	–	0	5	–	4	–	1
Indiana	1	–	4	–	1	2	–	5	–	1
Chicago	1	–	4	–	0	2	–	6	–	1
Iowa	0	–	3	–	1	1	–	6	–	1
Illinois	0	–	6	–	0	2	–	6	–	0
+ – Conference co-champions; Rankings from Dickinson System

The 1931 Big Ten Conference football season was the 36th season of college football played by the member schools of the Big Ten Conference and was part of the 1931 college football season.

The 1931 Purdue Boilermakers football team, under head coach Noble Kizer, compiled a 9–1 record, shut out six of ten opponents, tied for the Big Ten championship, and was recognized as national co-champion by Parke H. Davis. End Paul Moss and center Ookie Miller were recognized as first-team All-Americans.

The 1931 Michigan Wolverines football team, under head coach Harry Kipke, compiled an 8-1-1 record and finished the season in a three-way tie with Purdue and Northwestern for the Big Ten championship. The team shut out eight of ten opponents and led the conference in scoring defense (2.7 points allowed per game). The Wolverines also started a 22-game undefeated streak that lasted until October 1934. Center Maynard Morrison was selected as a first-team All-American.

The 1931 Northwestern Wildcats football team, under head coach Dick Hanley, compiled a 7–1–1 record and finished in a three-way tie for the Big Ten championship. Their sole loss was against Purdue on the final day of the season. Three Northwestern players were consensus first-team All-Americans: halfback Pug Rentner and tackles Jack Riley and Dallas Marvil.

Minnesota guard Biggie Munn won the Chicago Tribune Silver Football trophy as the most valuable player in the Big Ten and was also selected as a consensus first-team All-American.

== Season overview ==
=== Results and team statistics ===
Conf. Rank	Team	Head coach	Overall record	Conf. record	DS rank	PPG	PAG	MVP
1 (tie)	Purdue	Noble Kizer	9–1	5–1	#10	19.2	3.9	James Purvis
1 (tie)	Michigan	Harry Kipke	8–1–1	5–1	NR	18.1	2.7	Bill Hewitt
1 (tie)	Northwestern	Dick Hanley	7–1–1	5–1	NR	15.3	4.4	Paul Engebretsen
4	Ohio State	Sam Willaman	6–3	4–2	NR	21.6	8.2	Robert Haubrich
5	Minnesota	Fritz Crisler	7–3	3–2	NR	19.1	7.2	Biggie Munn
6	Wisconsin	Glenn Thistlethwaite	5–4–1	3–3	NR	10.5	11.0	Harold Smith
7	Indiana	Earl C. Hayes	2–5–1	1–4–1	NR	6.4	12.3	Joe Zeller
8	Chicago	Amos Alonzo Stagg	3–7–1	1–4	NR	7.1	13.8	Samuel Horwitz
9	Iowa	Burt Ingwersen	1–6–1	0–3–1	NR	0.9	16.4	Oliver Sansen
10	Illinois	Robert Zuppke	2–6	0–6	#4	7.3	17.5	Fred Frink

Key
DS = Rankings from Dickinson System. See 1931 college football season
PPG = Average of points scored per game
PAG = Average of points allowed per game
MVP = Most valuable player as voted by players on each team as part of the voting process to determine the winner of the Chicago Tribune Silver Football trophy

=== Bowl games ===
No Big Ten teams participated in any bowl games during the 1931 season.

== All-Big Ten players ==
The following players were picked by the Associated Press (AP), the United Press (UP) and/or the team captains (CPT) as first-team players on the 1931 All-Big Ten Conference football team.

Position	Name	Team	Selectors
Quarterback	Carl Cramer	Ohio State	AP, CPT, UP
Halfback	Pug Rentner	Northwestern	AP, CPT, UP
Halfback	Lew Hinchman	Ohio State	AP
Halfback	Jim Purvis	Purdue	CPT
Fullback	Jack Manders	Minnesota	AP, CPT, UP
End	Paul Moss	Purdue	AP, CPT, UP
End	Ivy Williamson	Michigan	AP, UP
End	Bill Hewitt	Michigan	CPT, UP [halfback]
Tackle	Jack Riley	Northwestern	AP, CPT, UP
Tackle	Dallas Marvil	Northwestern	AP, CPT, UP
Guard	Biggie Munn	Minnesota	AP, CPT, UP
Guard	Greg Kabat	Wisconsin	AP, CPT
Guard	Joe Zeller	Indiana	UP
Center	Maynard Morrison	Michigan	AP, CPT
Center	Ookie Miller	Purdue	UP

== All-Americans ==
Four Big Ten players were selected as consensus first-team players on the 1931 College Football All-America Team. They were:

Position	Name	Team	Selectors
Guard	Biggie Munn	Minnesota	AAB, AP, COL, INS, NEA, UP
Halfback	Pug Rentner	Northwestern	AAB, AP, COL, INS, NEA, UP
Tackle	Jack Riley	Northwestern	AAB, LIB, NEA
Tackle	Dallas Marvil	Northwestern	AP, INS

Other Big Ten players received first-team honors from at least one selector. They were:

Position	Name	Team	Selectors
End	Paul Moss	Purdue	LIB
Center	Maynard Morrison	Michigan	COL, NEA
Center	Charles Miller	Purdue	UP, CH
