= History of Michigan Wolverines football in the Kipke years =

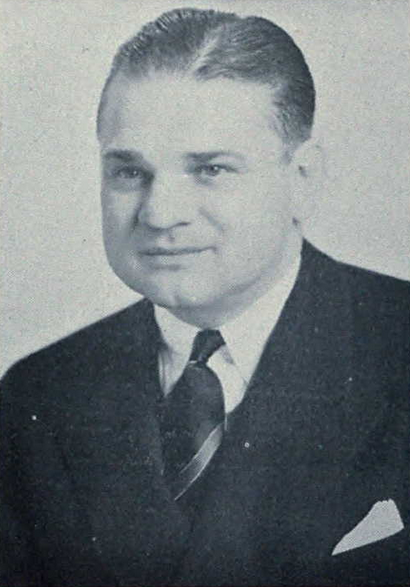
Harry Kipke

The history of Michigan Wolverines football in the Kipke years covers the history of the University of Michigan Wolverines football program during the period from the hiring of Harry Kipke as head coach in 1929 through his firing after the 1937 season. Michigan was a member of the Big Ten Conference during the Kipke years and played its home games at Michigan Stadium.

During the nine years in which Kipke served as head football coach, Michigan claimed two national championships (1932 and 1933) and had an additional undefeated season in 1930. From 1930 to 1933, Kipke's teams won four consecutive Big Ten Conference co-championships, lost only one game, gave up only 81 points (2.38 points per game), and compiled a record of 31-1-3 (.929). However, in the final four years under Kipke, the team never had a winning season and compiled a record of 10-22 (.313). Kipke was fired after the 1937 season and replaced by Fritz Crisler.

Two Michigan players from the Kipke years have been inducted into the College Football Hall of Fame. They are Harry Newman (quarterback, 1930–1932) and Whitey Wistert (tackle, 1932–1933). A third, Bill Hewitt, was inducted into the Pro Football Hall of Fame. Gerald Ford, who played for Michigan from 1932 to 1934, went on to serve as the 38th President of the United States.

== Year-by-year results ==
Season	Head coach	Conference	Place	Record	PF	PA
1929 team	Harry Kipke	Big Ten Conference	7th	5-3-1	109	75
1930 team	Harry Kipke	Big Ten	T–1st	8-0-1	111	23
1931 team	Harry Kipke	Big Ten	T–1st	8-1-1	181	27
1932 team	Harry Kipke	Big Ten	T–1st	8-0-0	123	13
1933 team	Harry Kipke	Big Ten	T–1st	7-0-1	131	18
1934 team	Harry Kipke	Big Ten	10th	1-7-0	21	143
1935 team	Harry Kipke	Big Ten	T–7th	4-4-0	68	131
1936 team	Harry Kipke	Big Ten	10th	1-7-0	36	127
1937 team	Harry Kipke	Big Ten	T–4th	4-4-0	54	110

== Overview of the Kipke years ==
=== Hiring of Kipke ===
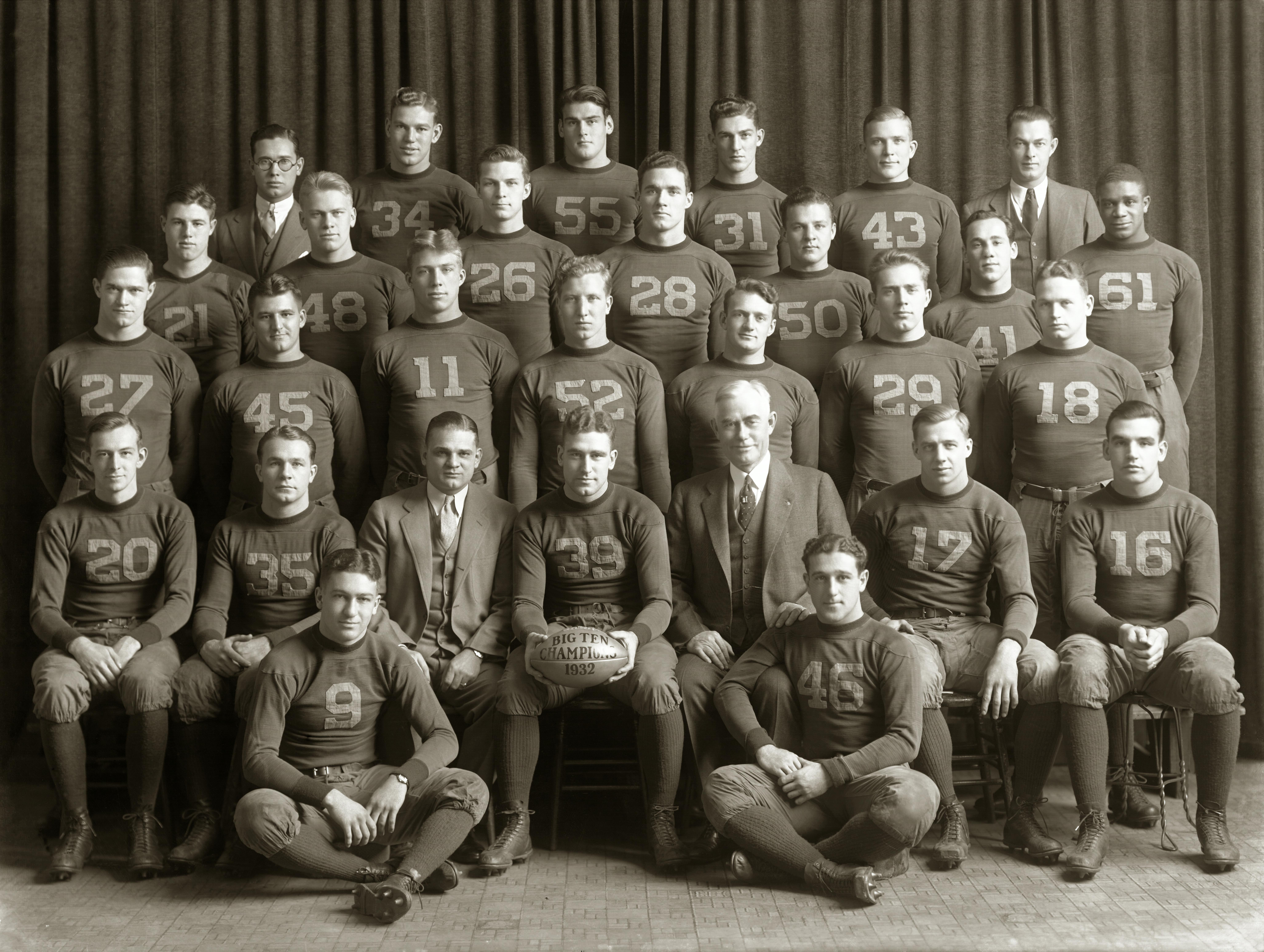
1932 national championship team including Gerald Ford (No. 48), Harry Newman (No. 46), and Willis Ward (No. 61)

After Michigan compiled a 3–4–1 record (2–3 Big Ten) in 1928, Michigan athletic director Fielding H. Yost announced in May 1929 that head football coach Tad Wieman would not be a member of the coaching staff in the fall. Two weeks later, in June 1929, Yost announced that Harry Kipke had been hired as Michigan's new head football coach. Kipke had been an All-American halfback on Yost's Michigan football teams from 1921 to 1923 and had developed a reputation as one of the best punters in the game. After graduating from Michigan, Kipke had been an assistant football coach at Missouri (1924–1927) and had been the head football coach at Michigan State in 1928. Kipke had signed a three-year contract with Michigan State, but the athletic board there accepted his resignation and agreed to release him from the final two years of his contract.

The tenure of Kipke's predecessor had been marred by a power struggle between the head coach and Yost. With Kipke in place, Yost announced that he was stepping aside and thereafter would "act solely as an interested spectator" unless his advice was sought. Kipke retained Jack Blott, Franklin Cappon, Cliff Keen, Bennie Oosterbaan, and George F. Veenker as assistant coaches.

=== Rebuilding in 1929 ===
In Michigan's first year under Kipke, the team finished in 7th place in the Big Ten Conference with record of 5–3–1 (1–3–1 Big Ten). The season began with three wins against non-conference opponents, Albion (39–0), Mount Union (16–6), and Michigan State (17–0). Three consecutive losses followed against conference opponents, Purdue (30-16), Ohio State (7-0), and Illinois (14-0). The team rebounded with wins against Harvard (14-12) and Minnesota (7-6) and closed the season with a scoreless tie against Iowa. The victory over Harvard was the first for Michigan, which had lost all four prior games against Harvard.

=== Undefeated in 1930 ===
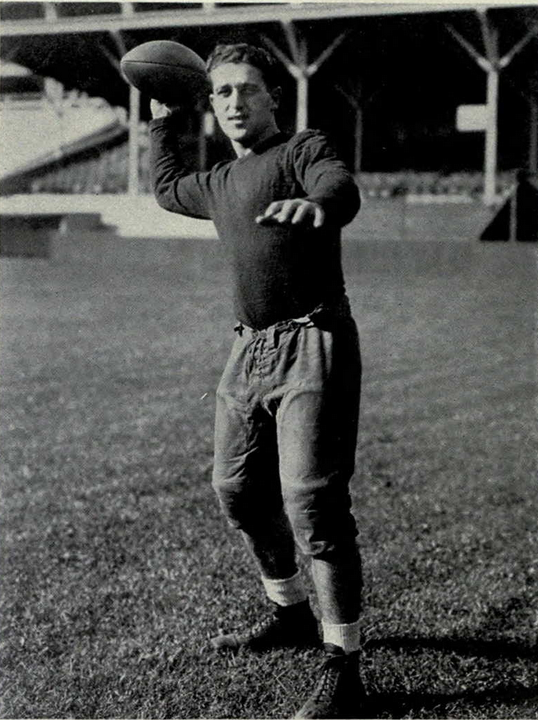
Harry Newman

In Kipke's second year, the Wolverines compiled their first undefeated season since 1923. They finished the season 8–0–1 (5–0 Big Ten), outscored opponents 111 to 23, and tied with Northwestern for the Big Ten championship. The sole setback was a scoreless tie against Michigan State in the third game of the season. The 1930 season marked the debut of Michigan's College Football Hall of Fame quarterback Harry Newman, who became a star in his first season leading the Wolverines' offense. Four members of the 1930 Michigan team were selected as first-team All-Big Ten players – Newman, center Maynard Morrison, halfback and team MVP Jack Wheeler, and right tackle Leo Draveling.

=== Eight shutouts in 1931 ===
The 1931 team compiled an 8–1–1 record (5–1 Big Ten), shut out eight of ten opponents, and outscored opponents 181 to 27. The team's only loss was a 20–7 defeat against Ohio State. In the nine other games, the Wolverines allowed only seven points throughout the season and did not allow a single point to be scored in the final six games. In the sixth game of the season, the Wolverines shut out a Princeton Tigers team coached by Fritz Crisler – the person who would replace Kipke as Michigan's coach in 1938.

The 1931 season ended with Michigan, Purdue and Northwestern in a three-way tie for the Big Ten championship. Center Maynard Morrison, who was known for his outstanding play on defense, was a consensus first-team All-American. Four Wolverines were named first-team All-Big Ten players – Morrison, Harry Newman, Ivy Williamson, and Bill Hewitt.

=== National championship in 1932 ===
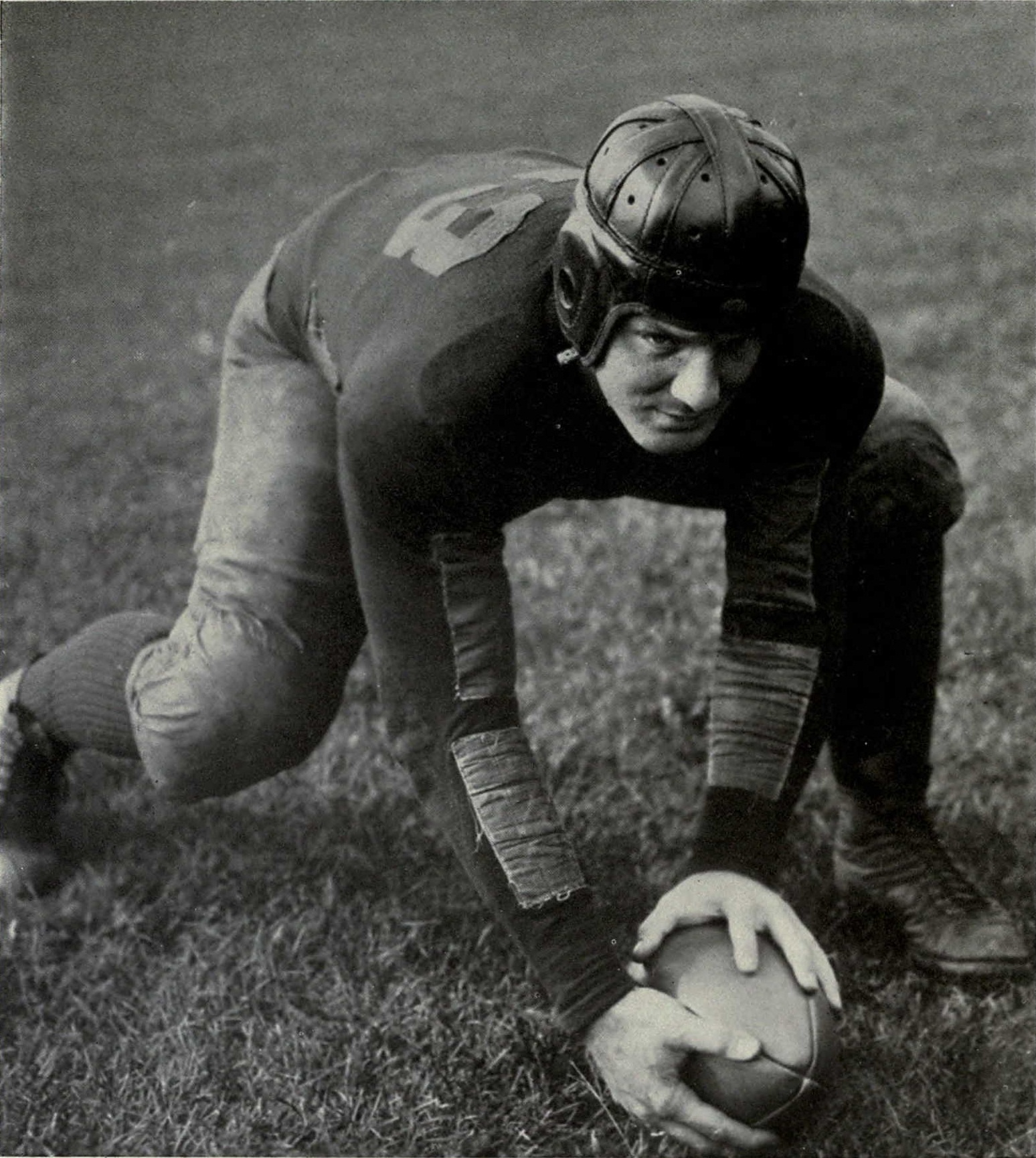
Maynard "Doc" Morrison

In 1932, Michigan compiled a perfect 8–0 record, outscored opponents 123–12, and won both the Big Ten Conference and national championships. The defense shut out six of its eight opponents and gave up an average of only 1.6 points per game. Although there was no AP Poll to determine a national champion in 1932, the Knute K. Rockne Trophy was presented at the end of the season to the team deemed to be the national champion using the Dickinson System, a rating system developed by Frank G. Dickinson, a professor of economics of the University of Illinois. Michigan won the Rockne Trophy, edging Southern California in the Dickinson rating system.

On offense, quarterback Harry Newman was selected as the consensus first-team quarterback on the 1932 College Football All-America Team. He also won the Chicago Tribune Trophy as the Most Valuable Player in the Big Ten Conference, the Douglas Fairbanks Trophy as Outstanding College Player of the Year (predecessor of the Heisman Trophy), and the Helms Athletic Foundation Player of the Year Award. Newman scored all 22 points for Michigan in the last three games of the season. The Associated Press wrote, "Without Newman providing the winning spark, the Michigan team might have been just another football club."

Center Chuck Bernard and end Ted Petoskey were also selected as first-team All-Americans by some selectors. The team captain, Ivy Williamson, was selected as a second-team All-American in the Central Press Association's captains poll. Gerald Ford, who later became the 38th President of the United States, was the back-up center on the team and won the Meyer Morton Award as the most improved player in spring practice.

=== National championship in 1933 ===
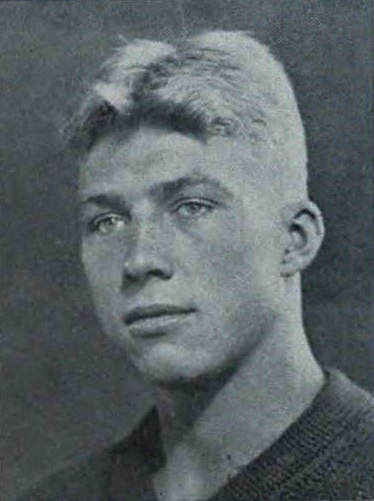
Whitey Wistert

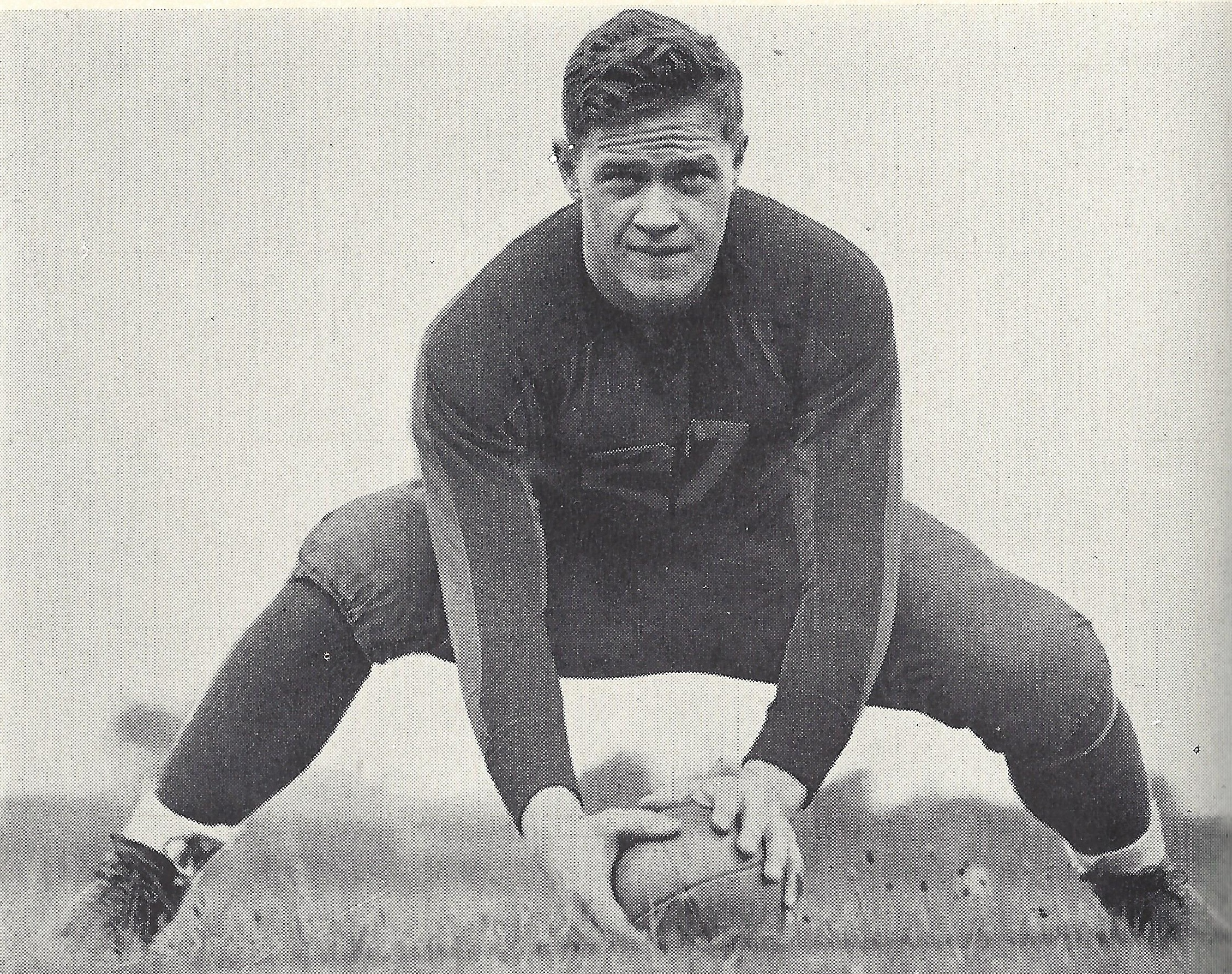
Chuck Bernard

The 1933 team compiled an undefeated 7–0–1 record, outscored opponents 131 to 18, extended the team's unbeaten streak to 22 games, and again won both the Big Ten and national championships. The defense shut out five of its eight opponents and gave up an average of only 2.2 points per game. For the second consecutive year, Michigan was awarded the Knute K. Rockne Trophy as the No. 1 team in the country under the Dickinson System. By winning a share of its fourth consecutive Big Ten football championship, the 1933 Wolverines also tied a record set by Fielding H. Yost's "Point-a-Minute" teams from 1901 to 1904.

In the first half of the season, Michigan outscored its opponents, 101 to 6, including a 13–0 shutout of Ohio State. In the second half, Michigan outscored its opponents 30 to 12 and defeated Illinois, 7–6, with the difference being Willis Ward's block of an extra point kick. In the annual Little Brown Jug game, Michigan and Minnesota played to a scoreless tie, breaking Michigan's 16-game winning streak (but still preserving the unbeaten streak). Two of Michigan's adversaries also finished among the top five teams in the post-season Dickinson ratings: Minnesota at No. 3 and Ohio State at No. 5.

Left halfback Herman Everhardus was selected as the team's Most Valuable Player. He was also the leading scorer in the Big Ten Conference with 64 points on eight touchdowns, 10 extra points, and two field goals. Center Chuck Bernard and tackle Francis Wistert were consensus first-team picks for the 1933 College Football All-America Team. Left end Ted Petoskey was also selected as a first-team All-American by several selectors. Michigan players also won four of the eleven spots on the All-Big Ten teams selected by the Associated Press and United Press. Michigan's first-team All-Big Ten honorees were Bernard, Everhardus, Petoskey, and Wistert.

=== "Punt, Pass and Prayer" years ===
From 1934 to 1937, Michigan did not have a winning season, compiling a record of 10-22 (.313). Michigan's offense scored only 179 points during those four years, an average of 5.59 points per game.

Due in part to injuries, Kipke's offense in 1934 was sometimes referred to as "Punt, Pass and Prayer." A September 1934 newspaper story described the system:

"A punt, a pass and a prayer. By Harry Kipke's own words, that's all they have over there. But when it's a [John] Regeczi punting, a [William] Renner passing, and a typical Michigan squad of good ends, good tackles, good guards, and a great center 'preying', how are you going to stop them?"

In a 1994 interview, Gerald Ford joked about how injuries during the 1934 season eliminated two of the options in the "Punt, Pass and Prayer" offense:

"In '32 and '33, we were undefeated, and then in '34 we had a tough, tough year. In those years, our offense was called a punt, a pass, and a prayer. We had an outstanding passer, Bill Renner, who broke an ankle before the season started. Our punter, John Regeczi, was the greatest college punter I ever saw and he ruined his knee. All we had left was the prayer."

Ford was selected as the Most Valuable Player on the 1934 team.

=== Racial integration ===
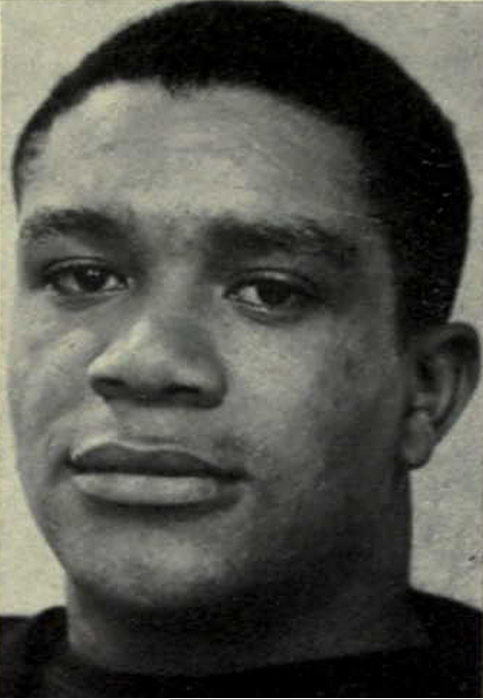
Willis Ward in 1934

During the Kipke years, Michigan's football team became racially integrated. Though George Jewett had broken the race barrier as Michigan's first African-American football player in 1890, Michigan had not played another African-American in the 40 years after Jewett. Kipke actively recruited Willis Ward to Michigan and assured him that he would be given full opportunity to play football as well as compete in track. Kipke reportedly "threatened to fight, physically fight, those alumni and fellow coaches who opposed his playing Ward."

In the spring of 1932, Kipke ordered his veterans to pound Ward "without mercy" during practice. "If, at the end of the week", said Kipke, "he doesn't turn in his uniform, then I know I've got a great player." Ward started four games in 1932 and all eight games in 1933. In November 1933, Time magazine credited Ward and halfback Herman Everhardus for Michigan's undefeated season.

In 1934, Ward started seven of eight games for Michigan. He scored 12 of Michigan's 21 points in 1934, including the only touchdown from the line of scrimmage. However, he was not permitted to play against Georgia Tech after the southern team announced that it would not take the field if Ward played. The controversy sparked mass meetings, petitions and demonstrations on the Michigan campus. Time magazine reported that 200 "campus radicals" threatened to prevent the game from being played by standing in the middle of the field. In an attempt to thwart any attempt to disrupt the game, Yost hired a Pinkerton agent to infiltrate "The United Front Committee on Ward", a conglomerate of student organizations that supported Ward's right to play.

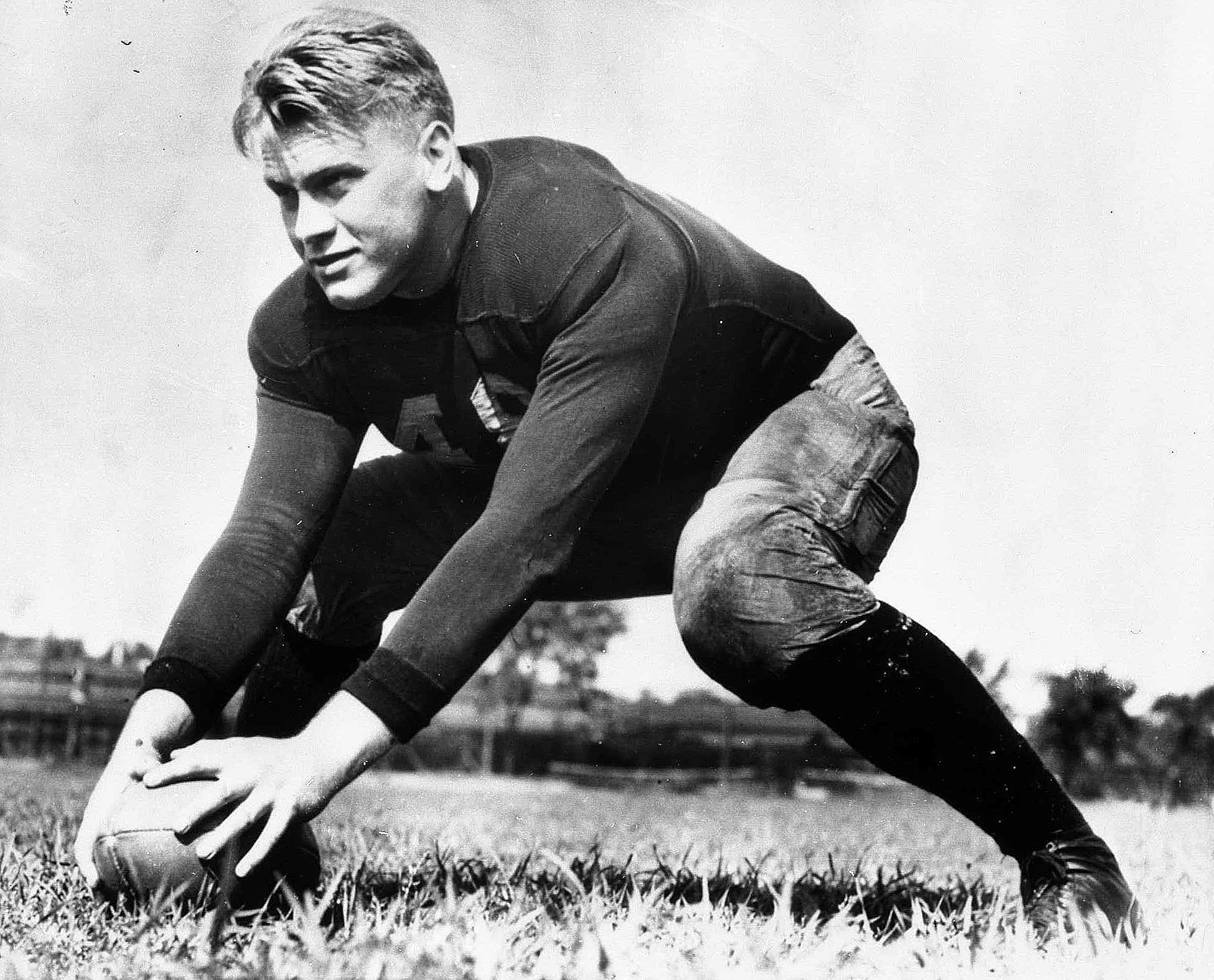
Gerald Ford in 1933

Playwright Arthur Miller, then a writer for Michigan's student newspaper arranges a meeting with Georgia Tech players and appealed to their sense of fair play. The Georgia Tech players rebuffed "the Yankee" Miller "in salty language" and told him they would actually kill Ward if he set foot on the Michigan gridiron. Miller was furious and wrote an angry article which the newspaper refused to publish.

The Georgia Tech incident later became part of the public legacy of President Gerald Ford. Ward and Ford met during freshman orientation in 1932, and the two became friends and roommates when the football team traveled for road games. When Ford learned that the school had capitulated to Georgia Tech, he reportedly quit or threatened to quit the team to take a stand for his friend, Ward. Ford wrote in his autobiography that he felt the decision to keep Willis out of the game was "morally wrong" and that he played in the game only after Ward urged him to do so. Ford recalled that, in the game against Georgia Tech, "we hit like never before and beat Georgia Tech 9–2."

=== Firing of Kipke ===
On December 9, 1937, Kipke was notified by the Board in Control of Athletics that his contract would not be renewed when it expired in June 1938. Kipke expressed shock at the decision, noting that he had expected a "splendid season" in 1938 based on the performance of 1937's freshman squad which included Tom Harmon, Forest Evashevski, Reuben Kelto, and Ralph Fritz. Kipke's firing created controversy among Michigan's alumni, leading University President Alexander Grant Ruthven to announce three weeks later that he would refer to the Board of Regents an alumni request for an investigation into Kipke's dismissal. Fritz Crisler was hired as Kipke's replacement in February 1938.

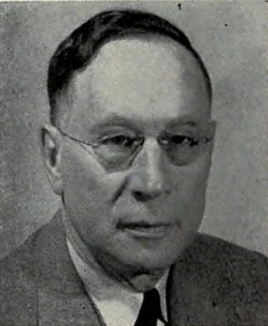
Ralph W. Aigler

The firing of Kipke and hiring of Crisler revealed a shift in power in Michigan athletics away from long-time athletic director Fielding H. Yost. Ralph W. Aigler, a law professor and chairman of Michigan's Faculty Board in Control of Athletics since 1917, was one of the first persons within the university to challenge Yost's authority. In 1937, Aigler's hiring of former Notre Dame head coach Hunk Anderson as assistant football coach was seen as a sign that "the iron hand of Fielding Yost carries less power than it did." At the time, it was reported: "Prof. Ralph Aigler is said to be rapidly becoming the dominant figure in Michigan's athletics." When Kipke was fired as Michigan's head coach in December 1937, Yost and Aigler were authorized to begin interviewing candidates for head coach. On February 10, 1938, Aigler made a public announcement that Fritz Crisler had been hired as Michigan's new head football coach. Aigler was reported to have hired Crisler without Yost's knowledge. In fact, the report of Crisler's hiring was combined with indications that "the impending retirement of Fielding H. Yost as Michigan's athletic director will be hastened to put Crisler in complete control." At that point, "it became clear that Yost no longer ran the athletic department. Uncharacteristically, Yost did not raise a ruckus; instead, he stepped aside graciously."

== Rivalries ==
=== Michigan State ===
Michigan coach Kipke is the only head coach in Michigan football history to have also served as the head football coach for the Michigan State Spartans. During the Kipke years, Michigan compiled a 3-4-2 record in the Michigan – Michigan State football rivalry. The Kipke years began with three wins and two ties. The Wolverines then lost four consecutive games to the Spartans from 1934 to 1937. Prior to the Kipke years, Michigan had lost only two games to Michigan State.

=== Minnesota ===
During the Kipke years, Michigan compiled a 4-4-1 record in its annual Little Brown Jug rivalry game with the Minnesota Golden Gophers. Michigan defeated Minnesota four straight years at the beginning of the Kipke years, including victories in 1930 and 1931 over Minnesota teams coached by Fritz Crisler, who replaced Kipke as Michigan's head football coach in 1938. In 1932, Bernie Bierman took over as Minnesota's head coach. Bierman's teams played Michigan to a scoreless tie in 1933 and then won nine straight games against the Wolverines, extending from 1934 to 1942.

=== Notre Dame ===
The Michigan–Notre Dame football rivalry was inactive during the Kipke years. The two programs did not meet between 1909 and 1942.

=== Ohio State ===
During the Kipke years, Michigan compiled a 3–6 record in the Michigan–Ohio State football rivalry. Michigan's only victories over the Buckeyes were in the Wolverines' undefeated seasons in 1930, 1932, and 1933. During the prime Kipke years from 1930 to 1933, Michigan lost only one game, the 1931 Ohio State game. Ohio State hired Francis Schmidt as its head football coach in 1934, and Schmidt's teams defeated Kipke's team four consecutive years from 1934 to 1937. Prior to 1935, the Michigan-Ohio State game was not played as the final game of the season. The tradition of having the two programs conclude their seasons with the rivalry game began in 1935, with Ohio State defeating Michigan 38–0 in Ann Arbor. The Buckeyes' 38-point margin in 1935 remains the largest victory margin for any Ohio State team in the rivalry's history.

== Michigan Stadium and attendance ==
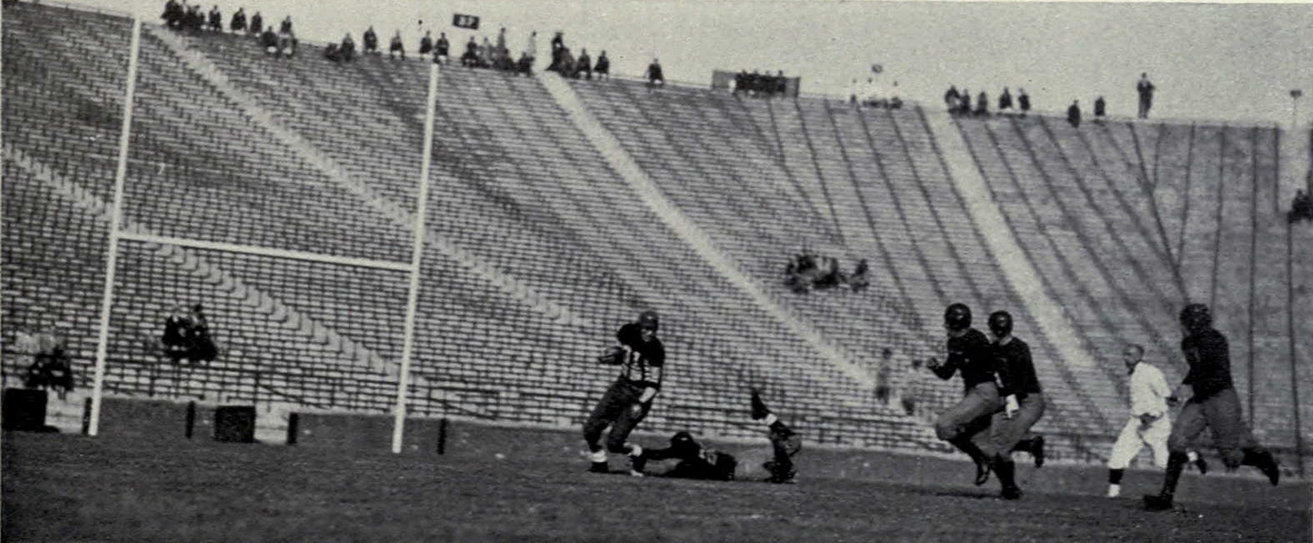
Sparse Depression era crowd at Michigan Stadium for the 1932 Illinois game.

Michigan played its home games at Michigan Stadium during the Kipke Years. On October 19, 1929, a record crowd of 85,088 spectators attended the Ohio State game, setting a single-game attendance record that stood until 1943. Ten days after the record-setting crowd attended the Ohio State game, the stock market crash of 1929 struck on Black Tuesday. The Great Depression followed for the next ten years and resulted in greatly reduced attendance at college football games nationwide. Michigan was not immune from the trend and saw its attendance drop significantly during the Kipke years, as follows:

- 1929 – total attendance of 267,655 across five dates for an average of 53,531
- 1930 – total attendance of 261,724 across six dates for an average of 43,620 (a decline of 10,000 spectators per game despite an undefeated season)
- 1931 – total attendance of 197,138 across seven dates for an average of 28,162 (including a crowd of 9,190 for the season's final game against Wisconsin)
- 1932 – total attendance of 144,295 across five dates for an average of 28,859 (despite an undefeated season and national championship)
- 1933 – total attendance of 206,394 across five dates for an average of 41,278 (12,000 per game less than in 1929 despite a second consecutive national championship)
- 1934 – total attendance of 122,526 across five dates for an average of 24,505 (the nadir of attendance during the Kipke years)
- 1935 – total attendance of 166,950 across five dates for an average of 33,389
- 1936 – total attendance of 146,797 across five dates for an average of 29,359
- 1937 – total attendance of 197,737 across four dates for an average of 49,184

In October 1930, Michigan Stadium became the first to use electronic scoreboards. The electronic scoreboards, installed at both ends, were controlled from a switchboard in the press box and displayed the score, downs, yards to go, and other information on a current basis.

== Coaching staff and administration ==
=== Assistant coaches ===
- Heartley Anderson – assistant coach (line), 1937
- Jack Blott – assistant coach, 1924–1933, 1946–1958
- William F. Borgmann – assistant coach, 1935
- Franklin Cappon – assistant coach, 1928–1937 (also Michigan's head basketball coach, 1931–1938)
- Ray Courtright – assistant coach, 1929–1930, 1932–1936 (also Michigan's golf coach, 1929–1944)
- Ray Fisher – assistant coach, 1921–1928, 1934–1945 (also Michigan's head baseball coach, 1921–1958)
- John P. "Jack" Heston – halfback, 1931–1933; assistant coach, 1934 (also the son of Willie Heston)
- Cliff Keen – assistant coach 1926–1930, 1932–1936 (also Michigan's wrestling coach, 1925–1970)
- Bennie Oosterbaan – assistant coach, 1928–1947 (also Michigan's head basketball coach, 1938–1946, and head football coach, 1948–1958)
- Carl Savage – tackle and guard, 1931–1933; assistant coach, 1935
- George F. Veenker – assistant coach, 1926–1929 (also Michigan's head basketball coach, 1926–1929)
- Wally Weber – assistant coach, 1931–1958
- Whitey Wistert – assistant coach, 1936

=== Others ===
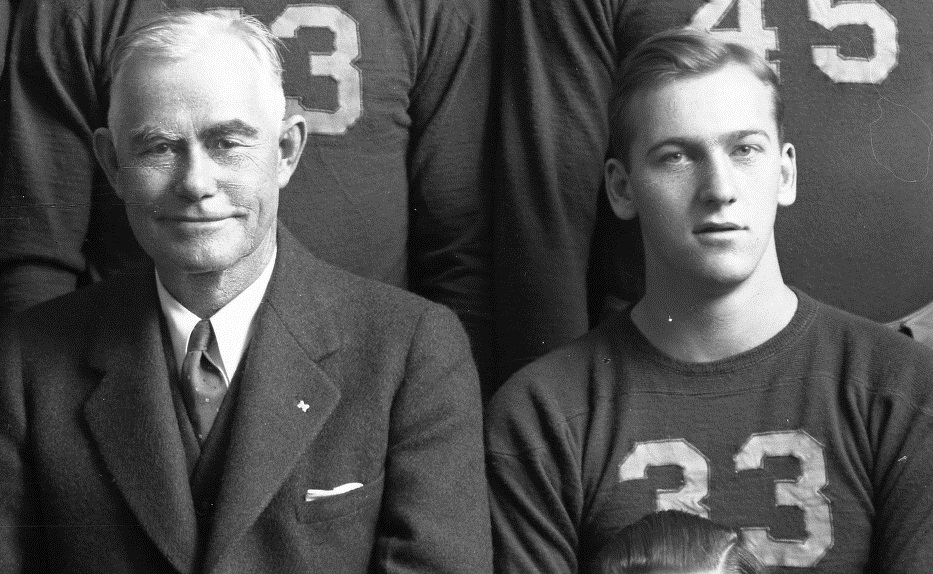
Fielding H. Yost and Stark Ritchie, 1936

- Ralph W. Aigler – chairman of Michigan's Faculty Board in Control of Athletics, 1917–1942, faculty representative to the Big Ten Conference, 1917–1955
- Charles B. Hoyt – trainer, 1923–1929 (also Michigan's assistant track coach, 1923–1929, and head track coach, 1930–1939)
- Ray Roberts – trainer 1930–1937
- Fielding H. Yost – athletic director, 1921–1940 (also Michigan's head football coach, 1901–1923, 1925–1926)

== Players ==
Name	Start Year	Last Year	Position(s)	Notes
Howie Auer	1929	1931	Tackle	All-Big Ten, 1931; Played 1 year in the NFL for the Eagles
Chuck Bernard	1931	1933	Center	All-American 1932 and 1933; Played 1 year in the NFL for the Lions; Gerald R. Ford was his back-up
William F. Borgmann	1932	1934	Tackle, Guard	Played on back-to-back undefeated national championship teams
Alan Bovard	1926	1929	Center	All-Big 10, 1929; Later served as head football coach and athletic director at Michigan Tech2007
John Brennan	1936	1938	Guard	Voted "queen" of UM's 1939 ice festival; Played in the NFL for the Packers
Norm Daniels	1929	1931	End, Halfback	Later served as the head football, baseball, basketball, wrestling, and squash coach at Wesleyan University
Tony Dauksza	1933	1933	Quarterback	Became the first person to traverse the Northwest Passage in anything other than a ship on solo canoe expedition, 1966–1971
Leo Draveling	1928	1930	End, Tackle	Later played in the NFL for the Cincinnati Reds
Herman Everhardus	1931	1933	Halfback	First-team All-Big Ten, 1933; Second-team All-American, 1933
Douglas Farmer	1935	1937	Quarterback	Later attended Harvard Medical School and became a professor of medicine at Yale School of Medicine
Stanley Fay	1931	1933	Halfback, Quarterback	Backfield starter for consecutive undefeated national championship teams
Gerald Ford	1932	1934	Center	MVP 1934 Michigan football team; 38th President of the United States
Elmer Gedeon	1936	1938	End	Played baseball for the Washington Senators; one of two MLB players killed in action during World War II after being shot down while piloting a B-26 bomber in 1944
Ralph Heikkinen	1936	1938	Guard	All-American 1939; MVP of the 1937 and 1938 Michigan football teams; Played 1 year in the NFL for the Brooklyn Dodgers
Bill Hewitt	1929	1931	End, Fullback	MVP 1931 Michigan team; Played 9 years in the NFL for the Bears, Eagles and Steagles; Inducted into the Pro Football Hall of Fame in 1971
Fred Janke	1936	1938	Tackle, Fullback	Later became the president and chairman of the board of Hancock Industries; also served as the mayor Jackson, Michigan, in the 1970s.
Ferris Jennings	1934	1936	Quarterback, Safety	Starting quarterback for the 1934 team
Archie Kodros	1937	1939	Center	Later served as head football coach at Whitman and Hawaii; assistant coach at Iowa for 14 years
John Kowalik	1931	1933	Guard	Played for the Ottawa Rough Riders in 1934
Omer LaJeunesse	1929	1931	Guard, Fullback	Head coach at Michigan Tech, 1957–1962
Maynard Morrison	1929	1931	Fullback, Center	First-team All-American in 1931
Harry Newman	1930	1932	Quarterback	Played for the NY Giants, 1933–1935; inducted into College Football Hall of Fame
Matt Patanelli	1934	1936	End	Selected MVP of Michigan's 1936 team; became the first Michigan football player to be selected in an NFL Draft; later served as assistant football coach at Western Michigan University (1944, 1948–1951) and the University of Michigan (1953–1958)
Ted Petoskey	1931	1933	End	All-American, 1932, 1933
Fred Ratterman	1932	1933	Quarterback	Later played professional football for the Cincinnati Reds for one game during the 1934 NFL season
John Regeczi	1932	1934	Fullback, Halfback	Later coached junior high school athletics for 36 years; inducted into the Muskegon Area Sports Hall of Fame in 1991
Hercules Renda	1937	1939	Halfback	Later served as an assistant football coach at Michigan, 1940–1941; also a high school football and track coach in Pontiac, Michigan for many years; inducted into the Michigan High School Coaches Hall of Fame
William Renner	1931	1935	Quarterback	Captain of the 1935 team
Stark Ritchie	1935	1937	Halfback	Later became general counsel of the American Petroleum Institute
James Simrall	1928	1930	Quarterback, Halfback	MVP of the 1929 team and captain of the 1930 team who later attended Harvard Medical School
Estel Tessmer	1930	1933	Quarterback	Starting quarterback before Harry Newman took over; later became a teacher and basketball coach at Bay City Central High School
Fred Trosko	1937	1939	Halfback	Meyer Morton Award in 1937; head football coach at Eastern Michigan, 1952–64
Joseph Truskowski	1926	1929	End	Later football coach at Olivet College and head baseball coach at Iowa State and Wayne State
Arthur Valpey	1935	1937	End	Later served as head football coach at Harvard and Connecticut
Willis Ward	1932	1934		Three-time All-American in track and field; NCAA high jump champion; Second African-American to earn varsity letter in football at Michigan; Georgia Tech refused to play Michigan in 1934 if Ward played
Jack Wheeler	1928	1930	Halfback, Fullback, Quarterback	MVP 1930 Michigan team; Finished 2nd in voting for 1930 Chicago Tribune Silver Football as Big Ten MVP
Ivy Williamson	1930	1932	End	Captain of the undefeated national champion 1932 team; Later served as head football coach and athletic director at Wisconsin
Whitey Wistert	1931	1933	Tackle	All-American, 1933; Inducted into College Football Hall of Fame, 1967; MVP in the Big Ten in baseball, 1934; Played Major League Baseball for the Reds in 1937; His No. 11 is 1 of 5 retired numbers at Michigan
