= 1931 Michigan Wolverines football team =

American college football season

1931 Michigan Wolverines football
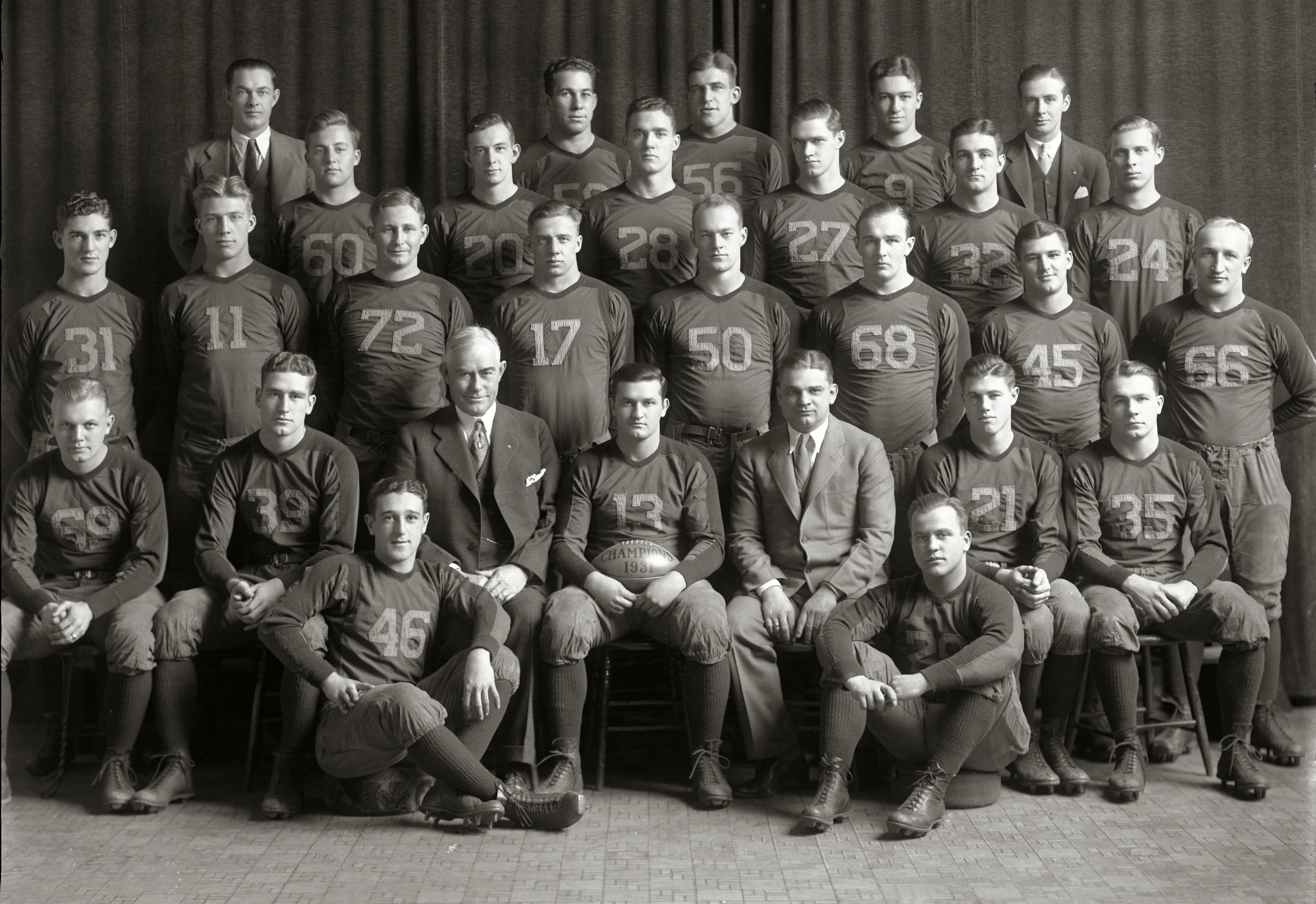

Big Ten co-champion
- Conference: Big Ten Conference
- Record: 8–1–1 (5–1 Big Ten)
- Head coach: Harry Kipke (3rd season)
- MVP: Bill Hewitt
- Captain: Roy Hudson
- Home stadium: Michigan Stadium

Uniform
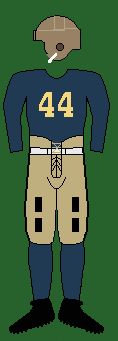

1931 Big Ten Conference football standings
	Conf.					Overall
Team	W		L		T	W		L		T
No. 10 Purdue +	5	–	1	–	0	9	–	1	–	0
Michigan +	5	–	1	–	0	8	–	1	–	1
No. 4 Northwestern +	5	–	1	–	0	7	–	1	–	1
Ohio State	4	–	2	–	0	6	–	3	–	0
Minnesota	3	–	2	–	0	7	–	3	–	0
Wisconsin	3	–	3	–	0	5	–	4	–	1
Indiana	1	–	4	–	1	2	–	5	–	1
Chicago	1	–	4	–	0	2	–	6	–	1
Iowa	0	–	3	–	1	1	–	6	–	1
Illinois	0	–	6	–	0	2	–	6	–	0
+ – Conference co-champions; Rankings from Dickinson System

The 1931 Michigan Wolverines football team represented the University of Michigan in the 1931 college football season. In their third year under head coach was Harry Kipke, the Wolverines compiled a record of 8-1-1 record (5-1 Big Ten), outscored opponents 181 to 27, and finished the season in a three-way tie with Purdue and Northwestern for first place in the Big Ten Conference. Defensively, the team shut out eight of ten opponents, allowed an average of only 2.7 points per game, and did not allow opponents to score a point in its final six games. After losing to Ohio State on October 17, 1931, the Wolverines went 22 games and nearly three years before losing another game on October 6, 1934.

Individual players of note on the 1931 Michigan team include center Maynard Morrison, who was selected as a first-team All-American by Grantland Rice for Collier's Weekly and by the Newspaper Enterprise Association (NEA). Bill Hewitt was selected as the teams Most Valuable Player and a first-team All-Big Ten halfback by the United Press (UP). Ivy Williamson was selected as a first-team All-Big Ten end by both the UP and Associated Press (AP).

== Schedule ==
Date	Opponent	Site	Result	Attendance
October 3	Central State (MI)*	Michigan Stadium; Ann Arbor, MI	W 27–0	13,169 (or ~80,000?)
October 3	Michigan State Normal*	Michigan Stadium; Ann Arbor, MI	W 34–0	13,169 (or ~80,000?)
October 10	Chicago	Michigan Stadium; Ann Arbor, MI (rivalry)	W 13–7	17,284
October 17	Ohio State	Michigan Stadium; Ann Arbor, MI (rivalry)	L 7–20	58,026
October 24	at Illinois	Memorial Stadium; Champaign, IL (rivalry)	W 35–0	33,496
October 31	at Princeton*	Palmer Stadium; Princeton, NJ	W 21–0	14,797
November 7	Indiana	Michigan Stadium; Ann Arbor, MI	W 22–0	26,410
November 14	Michigan State*	Michigan Stadium; Ann Arbor, MI (rivalry)	T 0–0	35,844
November 21	Minnesota^{†}	Michigan Stadium; Ann Arbor, MI (Little Brown Jug)	W 6–0	37,251
November 28	Wisconsin	Michigan Stadium; Ann Arbor, MI	W 16–0	9,190
*Non-conference game; ^{†}Homecoming

== Season summary ==
=== Week 1: Doubleheader ===
==== Central State Teachers ====
Michigan opened its 1931 season with a football doubleheader on October 3, 1931. The games attracted a crowd of nearly 80,000, most of whom were high school students invited by the university to attend the game without charge.

In the first game, Michigan's backup players defeated the team from Central State Teachers College (now known as Central Michigan University) by a score of 27 to 0. Michigan's touchdowns were scored by halfback Jack Heston (the son of former Michigan star Willie Heston), fullback Roderick Cox (1933 NCAA champion in the hammer throw), end Ted Petoskey, and substitute halfback Herbert Schmidt. Petoskey also kicked three points after touchdown.

Michigan's starting lineup against the Central State Teachers was Ted Petoskey (left end), DuVal Goldsmith (left tackle), John Kowalik (left guard), Thomas Cooke (center), Leslie Frisk (right guard), Cecil Cantrill (right tackle), Norm Daniels (right end), Louis Westover (quarterback), Heston (left halfback), Estel Tessmer (right halfback), and Roderick Cox (fullback).

==== Michigan Normal ====
Week 1b: Michigan Normal at Michigan

Team	1	2	3	4	Total
Michigan Normal	0	0	0	0	0
• Michigan	0	28	0	6	34

- Date: October 3
- Location: Michigan Stadium
  Ann Arbor, MI
- Game attendance: ~80,000
- Referee: F. A. Lambert (Ohio St.)

In the second game of the doubleheader, Michigan's first-team players defeated Michigan Normal by a 34 to 0 score. Michigan's touchdowns were scored by halfback Herman Everhardus (one-yard run in second quarter), backup halfback Jack Heston (16-yard run in second quarter), guard Stanley Hozer (four-yard run in second quarter), end Ted Petoskey (25-yard pass from William Renner), and halfback Stanley Fay (short run in second half). Hozer kicked two points after touchdown, and Petoskey and Omer LaJeunesse kicked one each.

Michigan's starting lineup against Michigan Normal was Bill Hewitt (left end), Howie Auer (left tackle), Hozer (left guard), Maynard Morrison (center), LaJeunesse (right guard), Tom Samuels (right tackle), Ivy Williamson (right end), Harry Newman (quarterback), Everhardus (left halfback), Stanley Fay (right halfback), and Roy Hudson (fullback).

=== Week 2: Chicago ===
Week 2: Chicago at Michigan

Team	1	2	3	4	Total
Chicago	0	0	7	0	7
• Michigan	0	13	0	0	13

- Date: October 10, 1931
- Location: Michigan Stadium
  Ann Arbor, MI
- Referee: J. H. Nichols (Oberlin)

On October 10, 1931, Michigan defeated Amos Alonzo Stagg's Chicago Maroons by a 13 to 7 score. Both of Michigan's touchdowns were scored in the second quarter on passes thrown by Harry Newman. Stanley Fay caught the first one, and Roy Hudson the second one. Newman also kicked a point after touchdown.

Michigan's starting lineup against Chicago was Bill Hewitt (left end), Howie Auer (left tackle), Leslie Douglass (left guard), Maynard Morrison (center), Omer LaJeunesse (right guard), Tom Samuels (right tackle), Ivy Williamson (right end), Louis Westover (quarterback), Stanley Fay (left halfback), Jack Heston (right halfback), and Roy Hudson (fullback).

=== Week 3: Ohio State ===
Week 3: Ohio State at Michigan

Team	1	2	3	4	Total
• Ohio State	7	0	6	7	20
Michigan	7	0	0	0	7

- Date: October 17
- Location: Michigan Stadium
  Ann Arbor, MI
- Referee: Frank Birch

On October 17, Michigan suffered its only loss of the season, falling to Ohio State by a 20 to 7 score. Jack Heston fumbled the opening kickoff at Michigan's 24-yard line. The defense held, but Heston then fumbled again on the next drive at Michigan's 31-yard line. Bill Carroll then ran for a touchdown in the first quarter. Ohio State's sophomore quarterback Carl Cramer also scored two touchdowns, including a 42-yard punt return in the fourth quarter. Michigan's only touchdown was scored by end Ivy Williamson with DuVal Goldsmith kicking the extra point. After losing to Ohio State, the Wolverines went 22 games and nearly three years before losing another game.

Michigan's starting lineup against Ohio State was Bill Hewitt (left end), Howie Auer (left tackle), Omer LaJeunesse (left guard), Maynard Morrison (center), John Kowalik (right guard), Tom Samuels (right tackle), Ivy Williamson (right end), Harry Newman (quarterback), Jack Heston (left halfback), Stanley Fay (right halfback), and Roy Hudson (fullback).

=== Week 4: at Illinois ===
Week 4: Michigan at Illinois

Team	1	2	3	4	Total
• Michigan	7	7	14	7	35
Illinois	0	0	0	0	0

- Date: October 24
- Location: Memorial Stadium, Champaign, IL
- Game attendance: 32,000
- Referee: Horatio B. Hackett

On October 24, Michigan defeated Illinois by a 35 to 0 score. Michigan's 35 points was the most scored against an Illinois team under head coach Robert Zuppke. Fullback Bill Hewitt averaged over six yards per carry on 24 carries. Michigan's five touchdowns were scored by Stanley Fay (2), Jack Heston John Kowalik, and Harry Newman (45-yard interception return). Ted Petoskey kicked two points after touchdown, and Newman kicked three.

Michigan's starting lineup against Ohio State was Petoskey (left end), Francis Wistert (left tackle), Stanley Hozer (left guard), Maynard Morrison (center), Omer LaJeunesse (right guard), Howie Auer (right tackle), Ivy Williamson (right end), Estel Tessmer (quarterback), Heston (left halfback), Fay (right halfback), and Hewitt (fullback).

=== Week 5: at Princeton ===
Week 5: Michigan at Princeton

Team	1	2	3	4	Total
• Michigan	7	0	0	14	21
Princeton	0	0	0	0	0

- Date: October 31
- Location: Palmer Stadium, Princeton, NJ

On October 31, Michigan defeated Princeton by a 21 to 0 score at Palmer Stadium in Princeton, New Jersey. Left halfback Stanley Fay scored two touchdowns for Michigan, and fullback Roy Hudson scored one. Harry Newman kicked two points after touchdown, and Ted Petoskey scored one.

Michigan's starting lineup against Princeton was Ivy Williamson (left end), Tom Samuels (left tackle), Omer LaJeunesse (left guard), Maynard Morrison (center), Stanley Hozer (right guard), ___ (right tackle), Ted Petoskey (right end), Bill Hewitt (quarterback), Fay (left halfback), Estel Tessmer (right halfback), and Roy Hudson (fullback).

=== Week 6: Indiana ===
Week 6: Indiana at Michigan

Team	1	2	3	4	Total
Indiana	0	0	0	0	0
• Michigan	9	6	0	7	22

- Date: November 7
- Location: Michigan Stadium, Ann Arbor, MI

On November 7, Michigan defeated Indiana by a 22 to 0 score at Michigan Stadium. Michigan touchdowns were scored by Stanley Fay, Ivy Williamson and Bill Hewitt. Williamson was also credited with a safety. Ted Petoskey and Harry Newman each kicked a point after touchdown.

Michigan's starting lineup against Indiana was Petoskey (left end), Howie Auer (left tackle), Stanley Hozer (left guard), Maynard Morrison (center), John Kowalik (right guard), Tom Samuels (right tackle), Williamson (right end), Estel Tessmer (quarterback), Fay (left halfback), Roy Hudson (right halfback), and Hewitt (fullback).

=== Week 7: Michigan State ===
Week 7: Michigan State at Michigan

Team	1	2	3	4	Total
Michigan St.	0	0	0	0	0
Michigan	0	0	0	0	0

- Date: November 14
- Location: Michigan Stadium, Ann Arbor, MI

On November 14, Michigan played Michigan State to a scoreless tie at Michigan Stadium. Michigan's starting lineup against Michigan State was Ted Petoskey (left end), Howie Auer (left tackle), Omer LaJeunesse (left guard), Chuck Bernard (center), Stanley Hozer (right guard), Tom Samuels (right tackle), Ivy Williamson (right end), Roy Hudson (quarterback), Jack Heston (left halfback), Stanley Fay (right halfback), and Bill Hewitt (fullback).

=== Week 8: Minnesota ===
Week 8: Minnesota at Michigan

Team	1	2	3	4	Total
Minnesota	0	0	0	0	0
• Michigan	6	0	0	0	6

- Date: November 21
- Location: Michigan Stadium, Ann Arbor, MI

On November 21, Michigan defeated Minnesota by a 6 to 0 score at Michigan Stadium. Michigan's only points came on a 56-yard run by Bill Hewitt in the first quarter. The starting lineup against Minnesota was Ted Petoskey (left end), Howie Auer (left tackle), Omer LaJeunesse (left guard), Maynard Morrison (center), Stanley Hozer (right guard), Tom Samuels (right tackle), Ivy Williamson (right end), Roy Hudson (quarterback), Jack Heston (left halfback), Stanley Fay (right halfback), and Hewitt (fullback).

=== Week 9: Wisconsin ===
Week 9: Wisconsin at Michigan

Team	1	2	3	4	Total
Wisconsin	0	0	0	0	0
• Michigan	0	0	9	7	16

- Date: November 28
- Location: Michigan Stadium, Ann Arbor, MI

On November 28, Michigan defeated Wisconsin by a 16 to 0 score at Michigan Stadium. Michigan touchdowns were scored by Bill Hewitt and Roy Hudson. Hudson also kicked a field goal, and Herman Everhardus kicked an extra point. The starting lineup against Wisconsin was Ted Petoskey (left end), Howie Auer (left tackle), Cecil Cantrill (left guard), Chuck Bernard (center), John Kowalik (right guard), Francis Wistert (right tackle), Ivy Williamson (right end), Harry Newman (quarterback), Everhardus (left halfback), Hudson (right halfback), and Hewitt (fullback).

=== Scoring summary ===
Player	Touchdowns	Extra points	Field goals	Safeties	Total Points
Stanley Fay	7	0	0	0	42
Roy Hudson	3	0	1	0	21
Ted Petoskey	2	8	0	0	20
Jack Heston	3	0	0	0	18
Bill Hewitt	3	0	0	0	18
Ivy Williamson	2	0	0	1	14
Harry Newman	1	7	0	0	13
Stanley Hozer	1	2	0	0	8
Herman Everhardus	1	1	0	0	7
Roderick Cox	1	0	0	0	6
Herbert Schmidt	1	0	0	0	6
Omer LaJeunesse	0	1	0	0	1
DuVal Goldsmith	0	1	0	0	1
unaccounted	1	0	0	0	6
Totals	25	20	1	1	181

== Players ==
=== Varsity letter winners ===
- Howie Auer, Bay City, Michigan - started 8 games at left tackle, 1 game at right tackle
- Chuck Bernard - center
- Cecil Cantrill, Lexington, Kentucky - started 1 game at right tackle
- Norm Daniels, Detroit, Michigan, Southeastern H.S. - started 1 game at right end
- Charles DeBaker - halfback
- Leslie H. Douglass, Gary, Indiana, Emerson H.S. - started 1 game at left guard
- Herman Everhardus, Kalamazoo, Michigan, Central H.S. - started 1 game at left halfback
- Stanley Fay, Detroit, Michigan, Northwestern H.S. - started 4 games at left halfback, 5 games at right halfback
- Leslie L. Frisk, Rock Island, Illinois - started 1 game at right guard
- DuVal P. Goldsmith, Christiansburg, Virginia, Fishburne Military Academy - started 1 game at left tackle
- Jack Heston, Detroit, Michigan, Northwestern H.S. - started 4 games at left halfback, 3 games at right halfback
- Bill Hewitt, Bay City, Michigan - started 4 games at left end, 5 games at fullback
- Stanley Hozer, Muskegon, Michigan - started 3 games at left guard, 3 games at right guard
- Roy Hudson, Girard, Ohio - 4 games at fullback, started 2 games at quarterback, 1 game at left halfback, 1 game at right halfback
- John Kowalik, Chicago, Illinois, Carl Schurz H.S. - 2 games at left guard, 2 games at right guard
- Omer LaJeunesse, Iron Mountain, Michigan - started 4 games at left guard, 4 games at right guard
- Maynard Morrison, Royal Oak, Michigan - started 9 games at center
- Harry Newman, Detroit, Michigan, Northern H.S. - started 3 games at quarterback
- Ted Petoskey, St. Charles, Michigan - started 6 games at left end
- Tom Samuels, Canton, Ohio, McKinley H.S. - started 8 games at right tackle
- Jay H. Sikkenga - guard
- Estel Tessmer, Ann Arbor, Michigan - started 3 games at quarterback, 1 game at right halfback
- Louis Westover, Bay City, Michigan, Central H.S. - started 2 games at quarterback
- Ivy Williamson, Toledo, Ohio, Bowling Green Central - started 9 games at right end
- Francis Wistert, Chicago, Illinois, Carl Schurz H.S. - started 1 game at left tackle
- Fielding H. Yost, Jr. - end

=== Varsity reserves ===
- George K. Bremen, halfback, Detroit, Michigan
- Harvey E. Chapman, tackle, Detroit, Michigan
- Frederick P. Clohset, tackle, Bay City, Michigan
- James Conover, guard, Ann Arbor, Michigan
- Thomas M. Cooke, tackle, Chicago, Illinois, Senn H.S. - started 1 game at center
- Roderick Cox, fullback, Birmingham, Michigan - started 1 game at left end, 1 game at right end, 1 game at fullback
- Russell Damm, tackle, Muskegon, Michigan
- Harry Eastman, Jr., halfback, Detroit, Michigan
- Harold Ellerby, end, Birmingham, Michigan
- Leslie L. Frisk, tackle, Rock Island, Illinois
- Francis Hazen, tackle, Bellingham, Washington
- William Horner, end, Jackson, Michigan
- Bethel B. Kelley, end, Bardstown, Kentucky
- Harold D. Lindsay, Detroit, Michigan
- Abe Marcovsky, guard, Pittsburgh, Pennsylvania
- Louis E. McCrath, tackle, Grand Rapids, Michigan
- Donald T. McGuire, end, South Haven, Michigan
- Leonard Meldman, tackle, Detroit, Michigan
- Robert E. Miller, tackle, Highland Park, Michigan
- Wallace B. Miller, tackle, Wilmette, Illinois
- Ward H. Oehmann, guard, Washington, D.C.
- William Renner, halfback, Youngstown, Ohio
- Carl Savage, tackle, Flint, Michigan
- Harry A. Shick, Jackson, Michigan
- Oscar A. Singer, guard, Jackson Heights, New York
- Harry Stinespring, quarterback, Chicago, Illinois
- Charles E. Stone, end, Detroit, Michigan
- Harry A. Tillotson, Ann Arbor, Michigan
- J. Leo Winston, center, Washington, D.C.

=== Awards and honors ===
- Captain: Roy Hudson
- All-American: Maynard Morrison (COL-1, NEA-1, AP-3, CP-3), Bill Hewitt (NEA-3)
- All-Big Ten: Maynard Morrison (AP-1, CPT-1, UP-2), Ivy Williamson (AP-1, UP-1), Bill Hewitt (UP-1, CPT-1; AP-2), Harry Newman (AP-2), Ted Petoskey (UP-2), Howie Auer (UP-2), Stanley Fay (AP-2, UP-2)
- Most Valuable Player: Bill Hewitt
- Meyer Morton Award: Herman Everhardus

== Coaching staff ==
- Head coach: Harry Kipke
- Assistant coaches

- Backfield coach: Wally Weber
- Line coach: Jack Blott and Franklin Cappon
- End coach: Bennie Oosterbaan
- "B" team coach: Ray Courtright and Cliff Keen
- Freshmen coach: Ray Fisher assisted by Bud Poorman, Jack Wheeler, and Alvin Dahlern

- Trainer: Ray Roberts
- Manager: John Sauchuck, assisted by Rehn Nelson, Louis Columbo, Elbert Gage, and William Jones
