= 1931 Purdue Boilermakers football team =

American college football season

1931 Purdue Boilermakers football

Co-national champion (Parke H. Davis) Big Ten co-champion
- Conference: Big Ten Conference
- Record: 9–1 (5–1 Big Ten)
- Head coach: Noble Kizer (2nd season)
- Home stadium: Ross–Ade Stadium

1931 Big Ten Conference football standings
	Conf.					Overall
Team	W		L		T	W		L		T
No. 10 Purdue +	5	–	1	–	0	9	–	1	–	0
Michigan +	5	–	1	–	0	8	–	1	–	1
No. 4 Northwestern +	5	–	1	–	0	7	–	1	–	1
Ohio State	4	–	2	–	0	6	–	3	–	0
Minnesota	3	–	2	–	0	7	–	3	–	0
Wisconsin	3	–	3	–	0	5	–	4	–	1
Indiana	1	–	4	–	1	2	–	5	–	1
Chicago	1	–	4	–	0	2	–	6	–	1
Iowa	0	–	3	–	1	1	–	6	–	1
Illinois	0	–	6	–	0	2	–	6	–	0
+ – Conference co-champions; Rankings from Dickinson System

The 1931 Purdue Boilermakers football team represented Purdue University in the Big Ten Conference (Big Ten) during the 1931 college football season. In their second season under head coach Noble Kizer, the Boilermakers compiled a 9–1 record (5–1 against Big Ten opponents), shut out six of ten opponents, suffered its sole loss to Wisconsin, tied with Michigan for the Big Ten championship, and outscored opponents by a total of 192 to 39. The team was recognized as national co-champion by Parke H. Davis.

End Paul Moss and center Ookie Miller were both recognized as first-team All-Americans. Moss received first-team honors from Liberty magazine, and Miller received the same from the United Press and College Humor magazine. Five Purdue players received honors on the 1931 All-Big Ten Conference football team: Paul Moss from the Associated Press (AP), United Press (UP), and captains' team (CPT); Ookie Miller (AP-2, UP-1); quarterback Paul Pardonner (UP-2); halfback Jim Purvis (CPT); and halfback Fred Hecker (AP-2, UP-2).

== Schedule ==
Date	Opponent	Site	Result	Attendance	Source
October 3	Western Reserve*	Ross–Ade Stadium; West Lafayette, IN	W 28–0		
October 3	Coe*	Ross–Ade Stadium; West Lafayette, IN	W 19–0		
October 10	Illinois	Ross–Ade Stadium; West Lafayette, IN (rivalry)	W 7–0	15,825	
October 17	at Wisconsin	Camp Randall Stadium; Madison, WI	L 14–21	30,000	
October 24	at Carnegie Tech*	Pitt Stadium; Pittsburgh, PA	W 13–6	20,000	
October 31	at Chicago	Stagg Field; Chicago, IL (rivalry)	W 14–6	10,000	
November 7	Centenary*	Ross–Ade Stadium; West Lafayette, IN	W 49–6		
November 14	Iowa^{†}	Ross–Ade Stadium; West Lafayette, IN	W 22–0	18,000	
November 21	at Indiana	Memorial Stadium; Bloomington, IN (Old Oaken Bucket)	W 19–0	22,000	
November 28	vs. Northwestern	Soldier Field; Chicago, IL	W 7–0	40,000	
*Non-conference game; ^{†}Homecoming

== Roster ==
- Dick Bateman, E
- Gene Boswell, T
- Paul R. Calvert, E
- Hal Chasey, HB
- Richard Chubb, T-C
- Paul Emmons, T-C
- Livy Eward, G
- Don Fassler, G
- Dutch Fehring, T
- J. F. Hecker, HB-FB
- Roy Horstmann, FB
- John Husar, T
- John Letsinger, G
- Ben Merz, E
- Ookie Miller, C
- John Moore, HB
- Paul Moss, E
- John Oehler, C
- Paul Pardonner, QB
- Jim Peele, QB
- Robert Peters, G
- James Purvis, HB
- Eddie Risk, HB
- Ed Ross, QB
- Les Sherbeck, G-C
- Sam Voinoff, G
- John White, QB
- Alex Yunevich, FB
