= 1931 Wisconsin Badgers football team =

American college football season

1931 Wisconsin Badgers football
- Conference: Big Ten Conference
- Record: 5–4–1 (3–3 Big Ten)
- Head coach: Glenn Thistlethwaite (5th season)
- MVP: Harold Smith
- Captain: Harold Smith
- Home stadium: Camp Randall Stadium

1931 Big Ten Conference football standings
	Conf.					Overall
Team	W		L		T	W		L		T
No. 10 Purdue +	5	–	1	–	0	9	–	1	–	0
Michigan +	5	–	1	–	0	8	–	1	–	1
No. 4 Northwestern +	5	–	1	–	0	7	–	1	–	1
Ohio State	4	–	2	–	0	6	–	3	–	0
Minnesota	3	–	2	–	0	7	–	3	–	0
Wisconsin	3	–	3	–	0	5	–	4	–	1
Indiana	1	–	4	–	1	2	–	5	–	1
Chicago	1	–	4	–	0	2	–	6	–	1
Iowa	0	–	3	–	1	1	–	6	–	1
Illinois	0	–	6	–	0	2	–	6	–	0
+ – Conference co-champions; Rankings from Dickinson System

The 1931 Wisconsin Badgers football team was an American football team that represented the University of Wisconsin in the 1931 Big Ten Conference football season. The team compiled a 5–4–1 record (3–3 against conference opponents), finished in sixth place in the Big Ten Conference, and was outscored by all opponents by a combined total of 110 to 104. Glenn Thistlethwaite was in his fifth and final year as Wisconsin's head coach.

Guard Greg Kabat was selected by the Associated Press (AP) and Central Press (CP) as a third-team player on the 1931 College Football All-America Team, and by the AP and the Big Ten team captains as a first-team player on the 1931 All-Big Ten Conference football team.

Tackle Harold Smith was selected as the team's most valuable player. Smith was also the team captain.

The team played its home games at Camp Randall Stadium, which had a capacity of 38,293. During the 1931 season, the average attendance at home games was 15,068.

== Schedule ==
Date	Opponent	Site	Result	Attendance	Source
October 3	Bradley*	Camp Randall Stadium; Madison, WI	W 33–6	21,000	
October 3	North Dakota Agricultural*	Camp Randall Stadium; Madison, WI	W 12–7	21,000	
October 10	Auburn*	Camp Randall Stadium; Madison, WI	T 7–7		
October 17	Purdue	Camp Randall Stadium; Madison, WI	W 21–14	30,000	
October 24	at Penn*	Franklin Field; Philadelphia, PA	L 13–27	65,000	
October 31	at Minnesota	Memorial Stadium; Minneapolis, MN (rivalry)	L 0–14	52,000	
November 7	at Illinois	Memorial Stadium; Champaign, IL	W 7–6		
November 14	Ohio State^{†}	Camp Randall Stadium; Madison, WI	L 0–6	35,000	
November 21	at Chicago	Stagg Field; Chicago, IL	W 12–7		
November 28	at Michigan	Michigan Stadium; Ann Arbor, MI	L 0–16	9,190	
*Non-conference game; ^{†}Homecoming
