= 1931 Illinois Fighting Illini football team =

American college football season

1931 Illinois Fighting Illini football
- Conference: Big Ten Conference
- Record: 2–6 (0–6 Big Ten)
- Head coach: Robert Zuppke (19th season)
- MVP: Fred Frink
- Captain: Gilbert Berry
- Home stadium: Memorial Stadium

1931 Big Ten Conference football standings
	Conf.					Overall
Team	W		L		T	W		L		T
No. 10 Purdue +	5	–	1	–	0	9	–	1	–	0
Michigan +	5	–	1	–	0	8	–	1	–	1
No. 4 Northwestern +	5	–	1	–	0	7	–	1	–	1
Ohio State	4	–	2	–	0	6	–	3	–	0
Minnesota	3	–	2	–	0	7	–	3	–	0
Wisconsin	3	–	3	–	0	5	–	4	–	1
Indiana	1	–	4	–	1	2	–	5	–	1
Chicago	1	–	4	–	0	2	–	6	–	1
Iowa	0	–	3	–	1	1	–	6	–	1
Illinois	0	–	6	–	0	2	–	6	–	0
+ – Conference co-champions; Rankings from Dickinson System

The 1931 Illinois Fighting Illini football team was an American football team that represented the University of Illinois during the 1931 college football season. In their 19th season under head coach Robert Zuppke, the Illini compiled a 2–6 record and finished in last place in the Big Ten Conference. End Fred Frink was selected as the team's most valuable player. Halfback Gil Berry was the team captain.

== Schedule ==
Date	Opponent	Site	Result	Attendance	Source
October 3	Saint Louis*	Memorial Stadium; Champaign, IL	W 20–6	13,535	
October 10	at Purdue	Ross–Ade Stadium; West Lafayette, IN (rivalry)	L 0–7	15,825	
October 17	Bradley*	Memorial Stadium; Champaign, IL	W 20–0	31,505	
October 24	Michigan	Memorial Stadium; Champaign, IL (rivalry)	L 0–35	33,496	
October 31	at Northwestern	Dyche Stadium; Evanston, IL (rivalry)	L 6–32	35,783	
November 7	Wisconsin	Memorial Stadium; Champaign, IL	L 6–7	15,313	
November 14	Chicago	Memorial Stadium; Champaign, IL	L 6–13	10,721	
November 21	at Ohio State	Ohio Stadium; Columbus, OH (Illibuck)	L 0–40	20,642	
*Non-conference game
