= 1931 Minnesota Golden Gophers football team =

American college football season

1931 Minnesota Golden Gophers football
- Conference: Big Ten Conference
- Record: 7–3 (3–2 Big Ten)
- Head coach: Fritz Crisler (2nd season)
- MVP: Biggie Munn
- Captain: Biggie Munn
- Home stadium: Memorial Stadium

1931 Big Ten Conference football standings
| | Conf. | | | | | Overall |
| Team | W | | L | | T | W | | L | | T |
|---|---|---|---|---|---|---|---|---|---|---|
| No. 10 Purdue + | 5 | – | 1 | – | 0 | 9 | – | 1 | – | 0 |
| Michigan + | 5 | – | 1 | – | 0 | 8 | – | 1 | – | 1 |
| No. 4 Northwestern + | 5 | – | 1 | – | 0 | 7 | – | 1 | – | 1 |
| Ohio State | 4 | – | 2 | – | 0 | 6 | – | 3 | – | 0 |
| Minnesota | 3 | – | 2 | – | 0 | 7 | – | 3 | – | 0 |
| Wisconsin | 3 | – | 3 | – | 0 | 5 | – | 4 | – | 1 |
| Indiana | 1 | – | 4 | – | 1 | 2 | – | 5 | – | 1 |
| Chicago | 1 | – | 4 | – | 0 | 2 | – | 6 | – | 1 |
| Iowa | 0 | – | 3 | – | 1 | 1 | – | 6 | – | 1 |
| Illinois | 0 | – | 6 | – | 0 | 2 | – | 6 | – | 0 |
+ – Conference co-champions; Rankings from Dickinson System

The 1931 Minnesota Golden Gophers football team represented the University of Minnesota in the 1931 college football season. In their second year under head coach Fritz Crisler, the Golden Gophers compiled a 7–3 record, shut out four opponents, and outscored all opponents by a combined score of 191 to 72.

Guard Biggie Munn was selected as the team's Most Valuable Player for the second consecutive year. Munn was also a consensus first-team player on the 1931 College Football All-America Team. Munn also received Chicago Tribune Silver Football, awarded to the most valuable player in the Big Ten Conference.

Two Golden Gophers received first-team honors on the 1931 All-Big Ten Conference football team. Munn and fullback Jack Manders both received first-team honors from the Associated Press (AP) and the United Press (UP).

Total attendance for the season was 115,631, which averaged to 23,126. The season high for attendance was against rival Wisconsin.

== Schedule ==
| Date | Opponent | Site | Result | Attendance | Source |
|---|---|---|---|---|---|
| September 26 | North Dakota Agricultural* | Memorial Stadium; Minneapolis, MN | W 13–7 | 15,000 | |
| September 26 | Ripon* | Memorial Stadium; Minneapolis, MN | W 30–0 | 15,000 | |
| October 3 | Oklahoma A&M* | Memorial Stadium; Minneapolis, MN | W 20–0 | 20,000 | |
| October 10 | at Stanford* | Stanford Stadium; Stanford, CA | L 13–7 | 32,000 | |
| October 24 | Iowa | Memorial Stadium; Minneapolis, MN (rivalry) | W 34–0 | 25,000 | |
| October 31 | Wisconsin | Memorial Stadium; Minneapolis, MN (rivalry) | W 14–0 | 52,000 | |
| November 7 | at Northwestern | Dyche Stadium; Evanston, IL | L 14–32 | 42,000 | |
| November 14 | Cornell (IA)* | Memorial Stadium; Minneapolis, MN | W 47–7 | 10,000 | |
| November 21 | at Michigan | Michigan Stadium; Ann Arbor, MI (Little Brown Jug) | L 0–6 | 37,251 | |
| November 28 | Ohio State | Memorial Stadium; Minneapolis, MN | W 19–7 | 25,000 | |
*Non-conference game

== Game summaries ==
=== Michigan ===
Week 8: Minnesota at Michigan

| Team | 1 | 2 | 3 | 4 | Total |
|---|---|---|---|---|---|
| Minnesota | 0 | 0 | 0 | 0 | 0 |
| • Michigan | 6 | 0 | 0 | 0 | 6 |

- Date: November 21, 1931
- Location: Michigan Stadium, Ann Arbor, Michigan

On November 21, 1931, Minnesota lost to Michigan by a 6 to 0 score at Michigan Stadium. Michigan's only points came on a 56-yard run by Bill Hewitt in the first quarter.

== Roster ==
- G Biggie Munn
