= 1931 Iowa Hawkeyes football team =

American college football season

1931 Iowa Hawkeyes football
- Conference: Big Ten Conference
- Record: 1–6–1 (0–3–1 Big Ten)
- Head coach: Burt Ingwersen (8th season)
- MVP: Oliver Sansen
- Captain: Oliver Sansen
- Home stadium: Iowa Stadium

1931 Big Ten Conference football standings
	Conf.					Overall
Team	W		L		T	W		L		T
No. 10 Purdue +	5	–	1	–	0	9	–	1	–	0
Michigan +	5	–	1	–	0	8	–	1	–	1
No. 4 Northwestern +	5	–	1	–	0	7	–	1	–	1
Ohio State	4	–	2	–	0	6	–	3	–	0
Minnesota	3	–	2	–	0	7	–	3	–	0
Wisconsin	3	–	3	–	0	5	–	4	–	1
Indiana	1	–	4	–	1	2	–	5	–	1
Chicago	1	–	4	–	0	2	–	6	–	1
Iowa	0	–	3	–	1	1	–	6	–	1
Illinois	0	–	6	–	0	2	–	6	–	0
+ – Conference co-champions; Rankings from Dickinson System

The 1931 Iowa Hawkeyes football team was an American football team that represented the University of Iowa as a member of the Big Ten Conference during the 1931 Big Ten football season. In their eighth and final year under head coach Burt Ingwersen, the Hawkeyes compiled a 1–6–1 record (0–3–1 in conference games), finished ninth in the Big Ten, and were outscored by a total of 131 to 7. They were shut out in seven of eight games and scored only seven points all year for the worst offensive performance in school history.

The team played its home games at Iowa Stadium (later renamed Kinnick Stadium) in Iowa City, Iowa.

== Schedule ==
Date	Opponent	Site	Result	Attendance	Source
October 3	Pittsburgh*	Iowa Stadium; Iowa City, IA	L 0–20	12,000	
October 10	vs. Texas A&M*	Fair Park Stadium; Dallas, TX	L 0–29		
October 17	Indiana^{†}	Iowa Stadium; Iowa City, IA	T 0–0	20,000	
October 24	at Minnesota	Memorial Stadium; Minneapolis, MN (rivalry)	L 0–34	25,000	
October 31	George Washington*	Iowa Stadium; Iowa City, IA	W 7–0		
November 7	at Nebraska*	Memorial Stadium; Lincoln, NE (rivalry)	L 0–7	15,729	
November 14	at Purdue	Ross–Ade Stadium; West Lafayette, IN	L 0–22	18,000	
November 21	Northwestern	Iowa Stadium; Iowa City, IA	L 0–19		
*Non-conference game; ^{†}Homecoming
