= Roderick H. Cox =

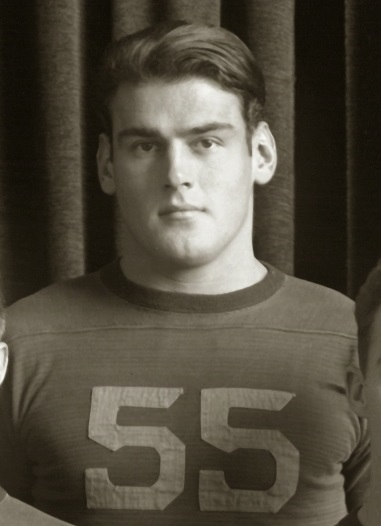
- Roderick Cox (cropped from 1932 Michigan football team portrait)
- Born: March 5, 1911; New York City, New York
- Died: August 25, 2000 (aged 89); Bethesda, Maryland
- Known for: NCAA champion, hammer throw (1933); UM Track & Field Hall of Fame (2012)

Roderick Howard Cox (March 5, 1911 – August 25, 2000) was an American track and field athlete, football player, teacher, and environmentalist. He was the NCAA champion in the hammer throw in 1933 and also played for the Michigan Wolverines football team from 1930 to 1932. Cox later served in the United States Navy and attained the rank of commander in the Naval Reserve. He was a teacher at the Sidwell Friends School for nearly 40 years.

== University of Michigan ==
Cox was born in the State of New York and grew up in Birmingham, Michigan. As a member of the Michigan Wolverines men's track and field team, he was a two-time All-American in 1932 and 1933. He won the 1933 NCAA Championship in the hammer throw with a distance of 156 feet, 3/4 inch. He also finished fifth in the event at the 1932 NCAA Championships.

Ketz also played college football at the end and fullback positions for the Michigan Wolverines football team during the 1930, 1931, and 1932 seasons. He was a teammate of President Gerald Ford on the undefeated 1932 Michigan Wolverines football team that won the national championship.

In 2012, Cox was posthumously inducted into the University of Michigan Track and Field Hall of Fame.

== Later years ==
After receiving a bachelor's degree from Michigan in 1933, Cox worked as a reporter for The Pontiac Press in Pontiac, Michigan, and taught at the Cranbrook Educational Community in Bloomfield Hills, Michigan. He later attended Harvard University and received a master's degree in teaching in 1941. During World War II, Cox served in the United States Navy, serving as a communications officer in Washington, D.C. After being discharged from active military duty, he remained active in the Naval Reserve and attained the rank of commander.

For almost 40 years, Cox taught world history and comparative religion at the Sidwell Friends School in Bethesda, Maryland, and eventually became head of the school's history department. He also served on the staff of Camp Keewaydin on Lake Temagami in Ontario, Canada for approximately 60 summers. He died in Bethesda in September 2000 at age 89.
