= 1931 Chicago Maroons football team =

American college football season

1931 Chicago Maroons football
- Conference: Big Ten Conference
- Record: 3–7–1 (1–4 Big Ten)
- Head coach: Amos Alonzo Stagg (40th season)
- Home stadium: Stagg Field

1931 Big Ten Conference football standings
	Conf.					Overall
Team	W		L		T	W		L		T
No. 10 Purdue +	5	–	1	–	0	9	–	1	–	0
Michigan +	5	–	1	–	0	8	–	1	–	1
No. 4 Northwestern +	5	–	1	–	0	7	–	1	–	1
Ohio State	4	–	2	–	0	6	–	3	–	0
Minnesota	3	–	2	–	0	7	–	3	–	0
Wisconsin	3	–	3	–	0	5	–	4	–	1
Indiana	1	–	4	–	1	2	–	5	–	1
Chicago	1	–	4	–	0	2	–	6	–	1
Iowa	0	–	3	–	1	1	–	6	–	1
Illinois	0	–	6	–	0	2	–	6	–	0
+ – Conference co-champions; Rankings from Dickinson System

The 1931 Chicago Maroons football team was an American football team that represented the University of Chicago during the 1931 college football season. In their 40th season under head coach Amos Alonzo Stagg, the Maroons compiled a 3–7–1 record, finished in eighth place in the Big Ten Conference, and were outscored by their opponents by a combined total of 130 to 71.

== Schedule ==
Date	Opponent	Site	Result	Attendance	Source
September 26	Cornell (IA)*	Stagg Field; Chicago, IL	W 12–0	10,000	
September 26	Hillsdale*	Stagg Field; Chicago, IL	L 0–7	10,000	
October 10	at Michigan	Michigan Stadium; Ann Arbor, MI (rivalry)	L 7–13	17,284	
October 17	Yale*	Stagg Field; Chicago, IL	L 0–27	35,000	
October 24	Indiana	Stagg Field; Chicago, IL	L 6–32	10,000	
October 31	Purdue	Stagg Field; Chicago, IL (rivalry)	L 6–14	10,000	
November 7	Arkansas*	Stagg Field; Chicago, IL	T 13–13	12,000	
November 14	at Illinois	Memorial Stadium; Champaign, IL	W 13–6	10,721	
November 21	Wisconsin	Stagg Field; Chicago, IL	L 7–12		
*Non-conference game
