= 1931 Indiana Hoosiers football team =

American college football season

1931 Indiana Hoosiers football
- Conference: Big Ten Conference
- Record: 2–5–1 (1–4–1 Big Ten)
- Head coach: Earl C. Hayes (1st season)
- MVP: Joe Zeller
- Home stadium: Memorial Stadium

1931 Big Ten Conference football standings
| | Conf. | | | | | Overall |
| Team | W | | L | | T | W | | L | | T |
|---|---|---|---|---|---|---|---|---|---|---|
| No. 10 Purdue + | 5 | – | 1 | – | 0 | 9 | – | 1 | – | 0 |
| Michigan + | 5 | – | 1 | – | 0 | 8 | – | 1 | – | 1 |
| No. 4 Northwestern + | 5 | – | 1 | – | 0 | 7 | – | 1 | – | 1 |
| Ohio State | 4 | – | 2 | – | 0 | 6 | – | 3 | – | 0 |
| Minnesota | 3 | – | 2 | – | 0 | 7 | – | 3 | – | 0 |
| Wisconsin | 3 | – | 3 | – | 0 | 5 | – | 4 | – | 1 |
| Indiana | 1 | – | 4 | – | 1 | 2 | – | 5 | – | 1 |
| Chicago | 1 | – | 4 | – | 0 | 2 | – | 6 | – | 1 |
| Iowa | 0 | – | 3 | – | 1 | 1 | – | 6 | – | 1 |
| Illinois | 0 | – | 6 | – | 0 | 2 | – | 6 | – | 0 |
+ – Conference co-champions; Rankings from Dickinson System

The 1931 Indiana Hoosiers football team represented the Indiana Hoosiers in the 1931 college football season. The participated as members of the Big Ten Conference. The Hoosiers played their home games at Memorial Stadium in Bloomington, Indiana. The team was coached by Earl C. Hayes, in his first year as head coach of the Hoosiers, and they compiled an overall record of 2–5–1, with a mark of 1–4–1 in conference play.

== Schedule ==
| Date | Opponent | Site | Result | Attendance | Source |
|---|---|---|---|---|---|
| September 26 | Ohio* | Memorial Stadium; Bloomington, IN | W 7–6 | 10,000 | |
| October 3 | Notre Dame* | Memorial Stadium; Bloomington, IN | L 0–25 | 12,098–18,000 | |
| October 17 | at Iowa | Iowa Stadium; Iowa City, IA | T 0–0 | 20,000 | |
| October 24 | at Chicago | Stagg Field; Chicago, IL | W 32–6 | 10,000 | |
| October 31 | Ohio State | Memorial Stadium; Bloomington, IN | L 6–13 | 20,000 | |
| November 7 | at Michigan | Michigan Stadium; Ann Arbor, MI | L 0–22 | 26,410 | |
| November 14 | at Northwestern | Dyche Stadium; Evanston, IL | L 6–7 | 19,000 | |
| November 21 | Purdue | Memorial Stadium; Bloomington, IN (Old Oaken Bucket) | L 0–19 | 22,000 | |
*Non-conference game
