= 1931 Northwestern Wildcats football team =

American college football season

1931 Northwestern Wildcats football

Big Ten co-champion
- Conference: Big Ten Conference
- Record: 7–1–1 (5–1 Big Ten)
- Head coach: Dick Hanley (5th season)
- Captain: Dal Marvil
- Home stadium: Dyche Stadium

1931 Big Ten Conference football standings
	Conf.					Overall
Team	W		L		T	W		L		T
No. 10 Purdue +	5	–	1	–	0	9	–	1	–	0
Michigan +	5	–	1	–	0	8	–	1	–	1
No. 4 Northwestern +	5	–	1	–	0	7	–	1	–	1
Ohio State	4	–	2	–	0	6	–	3	–	0
Minnesota	3	–	2	–	0	7	–	3	–	0
Wisconsin	3	–	3	–	0	5	–	4	–	1
Indiana	1	–	4	–	1	2	–	5	–	1
Chicago	1	–	4	–	0	2	–	6	–	1
Iowa	0	–	3	–	1	1	–	6	–	1
Illinois	0	–	6	–	0	2	–	6	–	0
+ – Conference co-champions; Rankings from Dickinson System

The 1931 Northwestern Wildcats team represented Northwestern University during the 1931 college football season. In their fifth year under head coach Dick Hanley, the Wildcats compiled a 7–1–1 record (5–1 against Big Ten Conference opponents), finished in a three-way with Purdue and Michigan for the Big Ten championship, and outscored their opponents by a combined total of 138 to 40.

== Schedule ==
Date	Opponent	Site	Result	Attendance	Source
October 3	Nebraska*	Dyche Stadium; Evanston, IL	W 19–7	35,000	
October 10	vs. Notre Dame*	Soldier Field; Chicago, IL	T 0–0	70,000	
October 17	UCLA*	Dyche Stadium; Evanston, IL	W 19–0	35,000	
October 24	at Ohio State	Ohio Stadium; Columbus, OH	W 10–0	41,455	
October 31	Illinois	Dyche Stadium; Evanston, IL	W 32–6	40,000	
November 7	Minnesota	Dyche Stadium; Evanston, IL	W 32–14	48,000	
November 14	Indiana	Dyche Stadium; Evanston, IL	W 7–6	19,000	
November 21	at Iowa	Iowa Stadium; Iowa City, IA	W 19–0		
November 28	vs. Purdue	Soldier Field; Chicago, IL	L 0–7	40,000	
*Non-conference game
