= Howie Auer =

American football player (1908–1985)

Howard Joseph Michael Auer
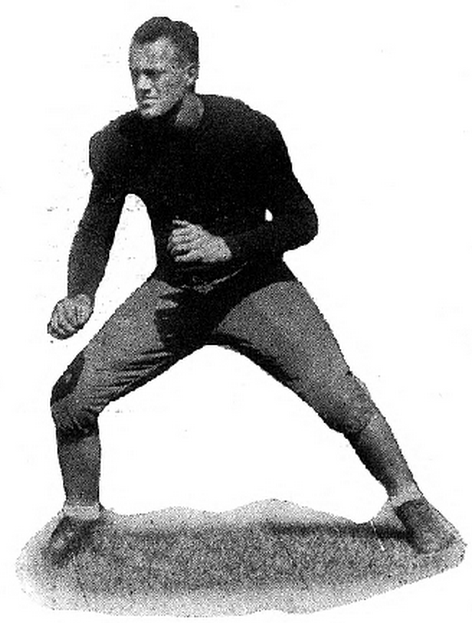
- Auer from the 1931 Michiganensian

Profile
- Position: Tackle

Personal information
- Born: January 9, 1908; Detroit, Michigan, U.S.
- Died: November 12, 1985 (aged 77); Florida, U.S.

Career information
- College: Michigan

Career history
- 1929–1931: Michigan Wolverines
- 1933: Philadelphia Eagles

Awards and highlights
- Greater Flint Area Sports Hall of Fame, 1988; Second-team All-Big Ten (1931)

Howard Joseph Michael Auer (January 9, 1908 – November 12, 1985) was an American football player, wrestler, and coach. He played for the Michigan Wolverines football teams from 1929–1931, captained the wrestling team in 1931, and played for the Philadelphia Eagles of the NFL in 1933.

Auer was born in Detroit, Michigan in 1908 and attended high school in Bay City, Michigan. He enrolled at the University of Michigan in 1928 and played football for Harry Kipke in his first three seasons as the Wolverines head football coach. As a sophomore in 1929, Auer was the starting tackle in seven of nine games played by the Wolverines. In 1930, injuries limited Auer to four games as a starter on the undefeated (8–0–1) 1930 Michigan team that tied for the Big Ten Conference championship. As a senior in 1931, he was a starting tackle in eight of Michigan's nine games and was part of another Big Ten co-championship team. At the end of the 1931 season, sports writer Hank Casserly picked Auer as a first-team player on his All-Big Ten team and explained the selection of Auer as follows:

"Auer of Michigan, a greatly underrated tackle, gets the other post on the first team. He was a consistent performer during every game and stole the show from his other rivals during the closing games of the season. Even in the Ohio State game, in which Michigan was outplayed, Auer stood out. He was a powerhouse on both offense and defense, and blocked tackles, ends, and guards, with equal ease and was one of the reasons why the Wolverines had the greatest all around line in the Western conference."

He coached the Flint Central Football team from 1939–1953, and holds a 83-39-5 record, including an undefeated 1947 team that was State Class A champion. Four teams won or shared Saginaw Valley Conference Championships. Auer coached 5 players that went to the NFL.

Auer was also selected as a second-team All-Big Ten player by the United Press in 1932.

After graduating from Michigan, Auer played one season of professional football for the Philadelphia Eagles. Auer lived in Venice, Florida in his later years. He died in 1985 at age 77.
