= Maynard Morrison (American football) =

American football player (1909–2006)

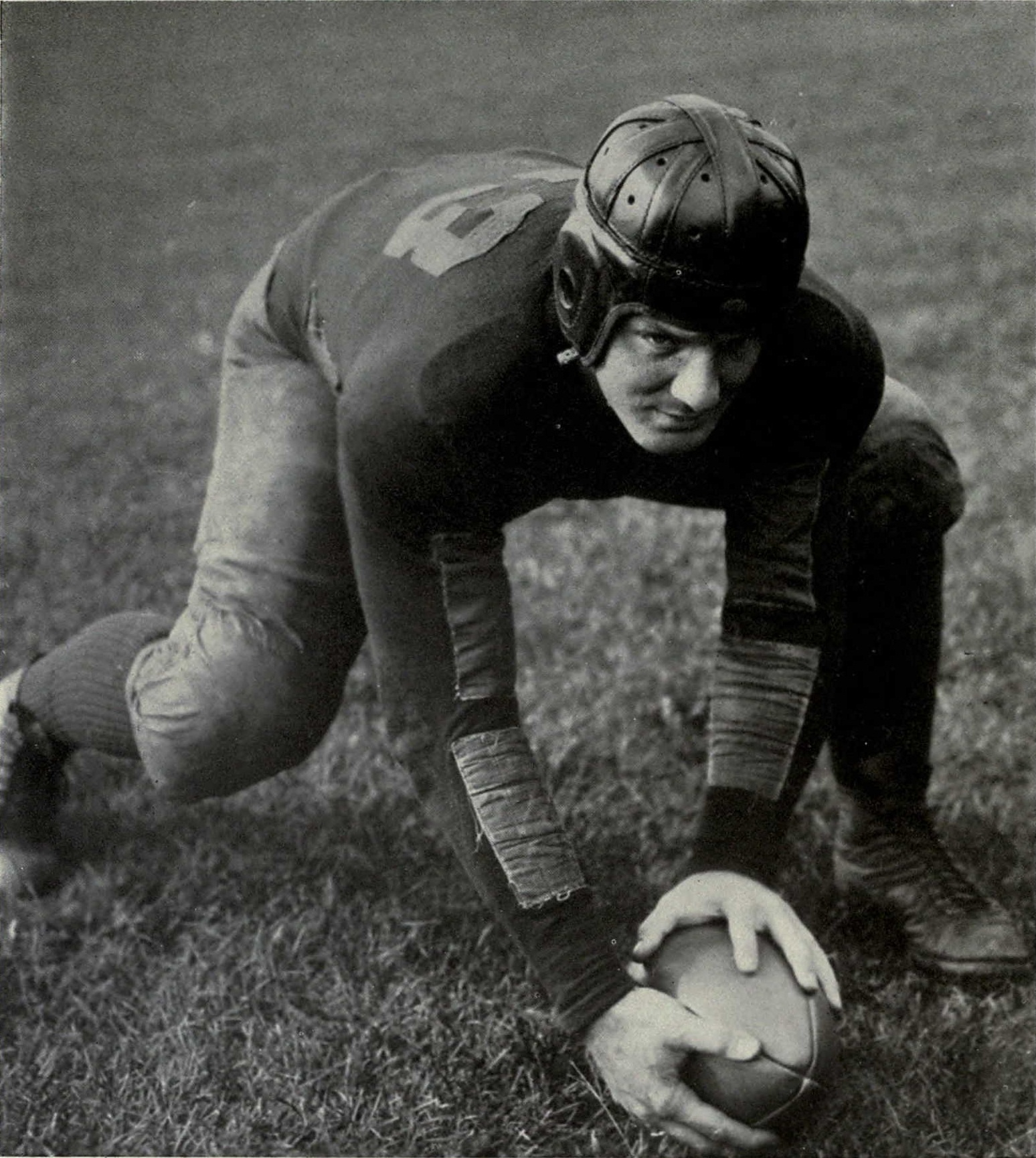
- Morrison from 1932 Michiganensian

Profile
- Positions: Center, Fullback

Career information
- College: Michigan (1929–1931)

Career history
- Brooklyn Dodgers (1933–1934)

Awards and highlights
- First-team All-American (1931); 2× First-team All-Big Ten (1930, 1931)
- Stats at Pro Football Reference

Maynard Davis "Doc" Morrison (May 28, 1909 – June 2, 2006) was an All-American football fullback and center for the University of Michigan Wolverines from 1929 to 1931. Michigan football coach Harry Kipke ranked Morrison as the finest linebacker he ever saw. "No one ever got past him," Kipke said. In 1931, he was chosen by Grantland Rice and the NEA Service as a first-team All-American at center and helped lead Michigan to a Big Ten Conference championship. Maynard also played for the Brooklyn Dodgers of the National Football League.

== College career ==
=== 1929 season ===
As a sophomore in 1929, Morrison was already a significant contributor at the fullback position. When Morrison finished his freshman year, he "was rated the outstanding fullback prospect in Michigan history." In the fall of 1929, Morrison missed five games at the beginning of the season due to injury. Then, against Illinois, he was placed in the lineup at tackle and became "the individual star of the Wolverines by a wide, handsome and undisputed margin." On defense, he was taken out of the line and played at defensive fullback, and when an Illinois back found a hole in the line, Grantland Rice wrote that “Morrison usually picked him up bodily and hurled him back into the breach in the wall.” And occasionally, "he was content with merely smacking the ball carriers against the ground as they had never been smacked before." After the Illinois game, Coach Kipke said of Morrison, "That boy will develop into the finest defensive back in Michigan’s history. His injured knee isn't entirely well, and when it is he will add more speed to his play."

At the end of the 1929 season, Coach Kipke touted Morrison as the best back to wear the Michigan uniform in 15 years: "Coach Harry Kipke says Maynard Morrison . . . is the nearest approach to Johnny Maulbetsch the Wolverines have seen in the last 15 years. Morrison is a husky sophomore of more than 200 pounds and hits the line with all the force and power that made Maulbetsch famous as a line smasher. Morrison suffered early season injuries that kept him from play during the first month but he is expected to show his stuff in the closing games." He scored a touchdown in a 14–12 victory over Harvard, as he "hurled his 210 pound bulk through the Crimson forward wall for a touchdown." After a scoreless tie with Iowa, the Associated Press reported that Morrison “was responsible for most of the Wolverine’s first downs.”

=== 1930 season ===
In the summer of 1930, Coach Kipke reported that he had 15 varsity caliber backs but was lacking in talent in the line. Accordingly, Kipke reported he was considering moving Morrison to the center position. Again in early September, Kipke announced that “so great is the lack of linemen” that he proposed making a center of Morrison. However, before making the move, Kipke had to persuade Morrison's father. One newspaper account in 1930 reported: "Maynard Morrison was a pretty good fullback last year at Michigan. Coach Harry Kipke though he saw great center possibilities in the young man from Royal Oak. But Morrison’s father wanted him to carry the ball. Kipke made the trip himself to Royal Oak to persuade Papa Morrison that Maynard would be better at flipping the ball than lugging it."

After ten days of experimenting during fall practice, Kipke made the switch, moving Maynard from fullback to center.

Morrison performed well at his new position in 1930, being praised by the AP for his “defensive genius.” At the end of the 1930 season, Morrison was named to All-Big Ten teams by the United Press and the NEA (Newspaper Enterprise Association) Service. One reporter noted that Morrison "was just about everything a coach could ask for in a center."

=== 1931 season ===
In 1931, Morrison started nine games for the 8–1–1 Wolverines team that tied for the Big Ten Conference championship. Morrison was selected as a first-team All-American in 1931 by Grantland Rice for Collier’s magazine and by the NEA Service All-America Board. The NEA Service All-America Board made their All-American selections based on more than 680 reports from coaches, writers and officials representing every section of the country where football was played. According to newspaper accounts reporting on Morrison being the consensus selection by the board members at the center position, it was noted that his "great defensive ability gave him the call." Thomas Yarr of Notre Dame was named the first-team center by the Associated Press in 1931.

In announcing Morrison as its All-Big Ten team center, the Associated Press described him as "Michigan’s 210 pound center from Royal Oak, Michigan," a player who was "big, shifty and fast," and "the key man of Michigan's defense." Football writer Merle Oliver called Morrison Michigan’s “diagnostician of enemy plays.”

Morrison was part of a long line of All-American centers at Michigan, starting with William Cunningham and Germany Schulz followed by Ernie Vick, Jack Blott, Bob Brown, and Chuck Bernard.

== Professional career ==
Maynard played for the Brooklyn Dodgers of the National Football League from 1933 to 1934.

== Honors and accolades ==
Among the honors received by Morrison are the following:

- First-team All-Big Ten in 1930 and 1931;
- First-team All-American in 1931 (as selected by Grantland Rice and the NEA Service);
- Inducted into the University of Michigan Hall of Honor in 1982.
- Inducted into the Royal Oak High School (Royal Oak, Michigan) Hall of Fame in 1998.
- In 2005, Morrison was selected as one of the 100 greatest Michigan football players of all time by the "Motown Sports Revival," ranking 50th on the all-time team.

== See also ==
- 1931 College Football All-America Team
- University of Michigan Athletic Hall of Honor
