= Estel Tessmer =

American football and basketball player (1910–1972)

Profile
- Position: Quarterback

Personal information
- Born: February 25, 1910
- Died: June 5, 1972 (aged 62)

Career information
- College: Michigan

Career history
- 1929–1931: Michigan Wolverines

Awards and highlights
- National champion (1933)

Estel S. "Zit" Tessmer (February 25, 1910 – June 5, 1972) was an American football and basketball player. A native of Ann Arbor, Michigan, Tessmer attended the University of Michigan where he played for the football and basketball teams. He played as a quarterback for the Michigan Wolverines football teams from 1929 to 1931 and 1933. He won the Chicago Alumni Trophy as a freshman in football. He started three games at the quarterback position in 1930 and three more in 1931, but his playing time at quarterback was limited because the 1930 and 1931 Wolverines included College Football Hall of Fame quarterback Harry Newman. After losing the starting quarterback job to Newman, Tessmer also played some games at the right halfback position. Tessmer also played three years as a guard for the Michigan Wolverines men's basketball team from 1931 to 1934. He later became a teacher and basketball coach at Bay City Central High School. He also threw two no-hit games as a baseball pitcher in intramural sports while attending Michigan. He was basketball coach at Bay City through 1953 and remained athletic director at the school thereafter. Tessmer died in 1972 at age 61. He was a resident of Bay City, Michigan at the time of his death.
