= John Kowalik =

American football player (1910–1978)

No. 45
- Position: Guard

Personal information
- Born: May 10, 1910
- Died: January 7, 1978 (aged 67); Detroit, Michigan, U.S.
- Listed height: 5 ft 10.5 in (1.79 m)
- Listed weight: 190 lb (86 kg)

Career information
- College: Michigan
- NFL draft: 1936: 2nd round

Career history
- 1934: Ottawa Rough Riders

Awards and highlights
- National champion (1933)

John F. Kowalik, Sr. (May 10, 1910 – January 7, 1978) was an American football player.

Kowalik was born in 1910. He played college football for the University of Michigan from 1931 to 1933. During Kowalik's three seasons as a starter, the Michigan football team compiled a record of 24–1–02, including consecutive national championships for the 1932 and 1933 teams. He was a teammate of future President of the United States Gerald Ford on the 1932 and 1933 Michigan teams. While at Michigan, Kowalik was a member of the Alpha Tau Omega fraternity and the Druids. He graduated from Michigan in 1934 with a bachelor of science degree in education.

After graduating from Michigan, Kowalik played professional football for the Ottawa Rough Riders in 1934.

Kowalik and his wife, Frances (LaRowe), had a son, John, Jr., and three daughters, Carolyn, Mary, and Janet. John Jr. played college football as a halfback for the University of Michigan from 1960 to 1962.

Kowalik lived in Franklin, Michigan, in his later years. He was employed as the automotive sales manager for Precision Casting Co. He died in January 1978 at Grace Hospital in Detroit.
