= Ivy Williamson =

American football and basketball player and coach

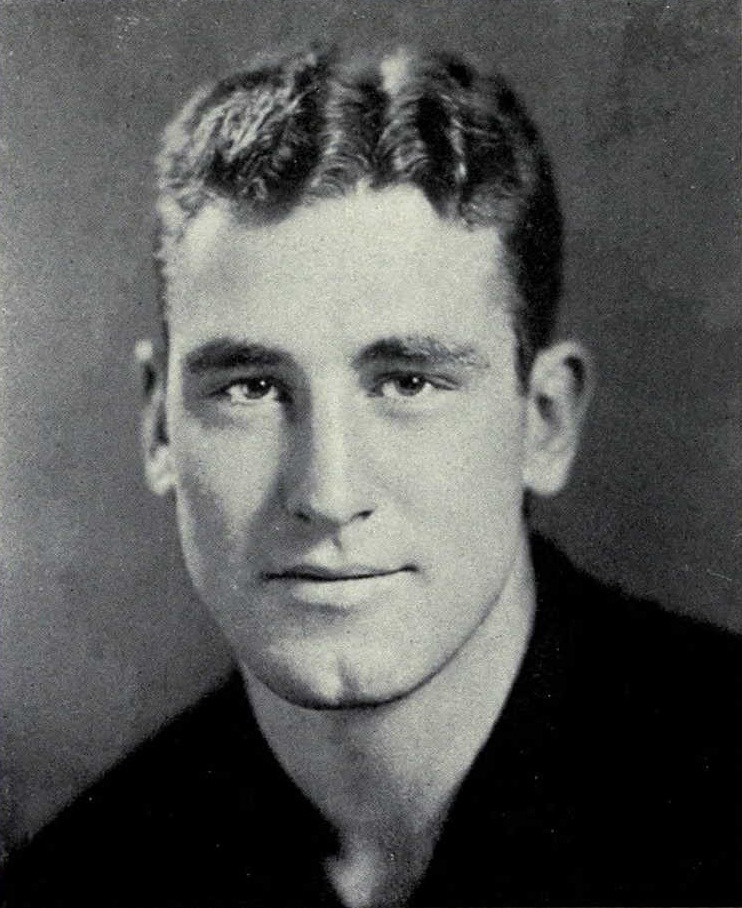
- Williamson in 1932

Biographical details
- Born: February 4, 1911; Wayne, Ohio, U.S.
- Died: February 19, 1969 (aged 58); Madison, Wisconsin, U.S.

Playing career

Football
- 1930–1932: Michigan
- Position: End

Coaching career (HC unless noted)

Football
- 1933: Roseville HS (MI)
- 1934–1941: Yale (line)
- 1945–1946: Yale (line)
- 1947–1948: Lafayette
- 1949–1955: Wisconsin

Basketball
- 1946–1947: Yale

Administrative career (AD unless noted)
- 1955–1969: Wisconsin

Head coaching record
- Overall: 54–24–4 (college football); 7–18 (college basketball)
- Bowls: 0–1

Accomplishments and honors

Championships
- 1 Big Ten (1952)

Awards
- 2× First-team All-Big Ten (1931, 1932)

Ivan B. "Ivy" Williamson (February 4, 1911 – February 19, 1969) was a player and coach of American football and basketball, and a college athletics administrator. He played college football and basketball at the University of Michigan from 1930 to 1932 and was captain of the national champion 1932 Michigan football team. He was an assistant football coach at Yale University (1934–1941, 1945–1946) and the head football coach at Lafayette College (1947–1948) and the University of Wisconsin–Madison (1949–1955). He served as the athletic director at Wisconsin from 1955 to 1969.

== Early life and playing career ==
Williamson was born and grew up near Toledo, Ohio in Prairie Depot, now known as Wayne, Ohio. He attended Bowling Green High School where he was a star athlete. During his senior year, Williamson contracted osteomyelitis, an infection in his ankle bone. Despite being told that he would probably not play football again, Williamson worked himself back into shape and became a star football player in college.

=== Michigan ===
Williamson attended the University of Michigan, where he played basketball and football. He won two varsity letters in basketball and three in football. He was first-team All-Big Ten in football in 1931 and 1932 and was captain of the national champion 1932 Michigan football team. Michigan's head coach Harry Kipke said, "Ivy Williamson is the smartest I have ever had or hope to have." In his three years playing football for Michigan, the Wolverines won three straight Big Ten titles and had an overall record of 24 wins, one loss and two ties. Williamson graduated from the University of Michigan in 1933 with distinction and received the Gold Medal award from the university president as "the outstanding gentleman, athlete and scholar in the Class of 1933."

== Coaching career ==
=== High school coach ===
After graduating from Michigan in 1933, Williamson taught economics and history and coached basketball and football at Roseville High School in Roseville, Michigan. He led Roseville's football team to an undefeated season in 1933.

=== Yale and military service ===
In 1934, Williamson was hired as an assistant football coach at Yale University. He remained an assistant coach under Ducky Pond from 1934 to 1940 and remained on the staff under head coach Spike Nelson in 1941.

In June 1942, Williamson was commissioned a lieutenant junior grade in the United States Naval Reserve and entered the U.S. Navy. He was assigned to coach a Navy football team in 1942 with Potsy Clark at Pensacola, Florida. During three years in the military, Williamson had tours of duty at a Naval station in Sanford, Florida, a gunnery school in Hollywood, Florida, the cadet selection board in Detroit, Michigan and the carrier USS Wolverine in Chicago. He remained in the Navy for three years and was discharged in 1945.

Williamson rejoined the Yale coaching staff in 1945 under head coach Howard Odell. Williamson also served as the head basketball coach at Yale University for the 1946–47 season.

=== Lafayette ===
In 1947, Williamson was hired as the head coach at Lafayette College in Easton, Pennsylvania. In the two years before Williamson was hired, the Lafayette football team won only 3 games, lost 14 and tied 1. Williamson immediately turned the program around, leading the team to a 6–3 record in 1947 and 7–2 in 1948. The only losses in 1947 were to Army and Rutgers.

=== Wisconsin ===
In February 1949, Williamson was hired as the head football coach at the University of Wisconsin–Madison. He again took over a program with a losing record, as the Badgers finished 2–7 the year before Williamson was hired. The team steadily improved in the first three years under Williamson, finishing 5–3–1 in 1949, 6–3 in 1950, and 7–1–1 in 1951. The 1952 team finished the regular season 6–2–1, tied for the Big Ten championship. The Badgers lost to the USC Trojans in the 1953 Rose Bowl by a 7–0 score.

In January 1951, Williamson was approached by the University of Southern California about taking the head coaching job for the Trojans. The University of Wisconsin offered Williamson a pay raise of $2,000 (from $10,300 to $12,500), and raises of $1,500 to his four assistant coaches to persuade him to stay. In 1953, the Saturday Evening Post published an article on Williamson titled, "That Gentlemanly Coach at Wisconsin." The article's author, Harry Paxton, wrote: "Ivy Williamson is a big, unruffled Midwesterner from a small Ohio farm town. He speaks mildly and calmly. He never dramatizes himself, but somehow with him seems to get a feeling that here is a nice, honest fellow with a good head on his shoulders. He has a natural gift for winning and keeping the confidence of all sorts of people—alumni and other boosters; faculty and school officials, players and prospective players."

The team continued to thrive in 1953 with a record of 6–2–1 and in 1954 with a record of 7–2. Williamson experienced his first losing season as a head coach in 1955 with a record of 4–5.

== Administrative career ==
In November 1955, Williamson became Wisconsin's athletic director following the death of athletic director Guy Sundt. He was replaced as head football coach by Milt Bruhn. Due to a university policy providing that the athletic director could not be paid a salary higher than that of the dean, the move to athletic director came with a salary cut from $15,300 to $13,500.

During Williamson's 13 years as athletic director, he increased the capacity of Camp Randall Stadium to 77,000 with the construction of an upper deck, expanded intramural facilities, restored men's ice hockey as a varsity sport, and built a new natatorium, a new baseball field and a running track. In 1955, the University of Wisconsin announced that the newly established Ivy Williamson Trophy would be presented each year to the senior football player showing the highest degree of sportsmanship throughout his career. In December 1957, Williamson was one of 25 former college football players chosen by Sports Illustrated for its silver anniversary All-American team honoring players with outstanding career and community service records. In January 1963, Williamson was elected permanent chairman of the NCAA Football Rules Committee.

The football program continued to thrive into the early 1960s, but went into a steep decline later in the decade, finishing 8–19 from 1964 to 1966 and then having consecutive winless seasons in 1967 and 1968.

=== Firing and death ===
In January 1969, after five straight losing seasons and with the athletic department having a deficit, Williamson was fired as Wisconsin's athletic director at age 57. He was reassigned to a new position in the school of physical education with a reduction in salary from $23,000 to $18,800. He was described by those who knew him as "a man crushed in spirit" after his removal as athletic director.

Less than six weeks after his firing, Williamson died from irreversible brain stem damage after falling down the basement stairs at his home in Maple Bluff, Wisconsin. He was taken by ambulance to the University Hospital in Madison, where he was pronounced dead. He was survived by his wife, Beulah, and twin sons, Jack and David.

== Head coaching record ==
=== College football ===
Year	Team	Overall	Conference	Standing	Bowl/playoffs	Coaches^{#}	AP^{°}
Lafayette Leopards (Middle Three Conference) (1947–1948)
1947	Lafayette	6–3	1–1	2nd			
1948	Lafayette	7–2	1–1	2nd			
Lafayette:		13–5	2–2				
Wisconsin Badgers (Big Ten Conference) (1949–1955)
1949	Wisconsin	5–3–1	3–2–1	4th			
1950	Wisconsin	6–3	5–2	T–2nd		T–20	
1951	Wisconsin	7–1–1	5–1–1	3rd		8	8
1952	Wisconsin	6–3–1	4–1–1	T–1st	L Rose	10	11
1953	Wisconsin	6–2–1	4–1–1	3rd		14	15
1954	Wisconsin	7–2	5–2	T–2nd		10	9
1955	Wisconsin	4–5	3–4	6th			
Wisconsin:		41–19–4	29–13–4				
Total:		54–24–4					
National championship Conference title Conference division title or championship game berth
^{#}Rankings from final Coaches Poll.; ^{°}Rankings from final AP Poll.
