= Fred Frink =

American baseball player (1911-1995)

- Outfielder
- Born: August 25, 1911; Macon, Georgia, U.S.
- Died: May 19, 1995 (aged 83); Miami Springs, Florida, U.S.
- Batted: Right Threw: Right

MLB debut
- July 1, 1934, for the Philadelphia Phillies

Last MLB appearance
- July 14, 1934, for the Philadelphia Phillies

MLB statistics
- Games played: 2
- At bats: 0
- Hits: 0
- Stats at Baseball Reference

Teams
- Philadelphia Phillies (1934)

Frederick Ferdinand Frink (August 25, 1911 – May 19, 1995) was an American outfielder in Major League Baseball. Frink was born on August 25, 1911, in Macon, Georgia, and attended the University of Illinois at Urbana-Champaign. He played in two games in his major league career, with no at bats. Frink died on May 19, 1995, in Miami Springs, Florida.
