= 1931 Ohio State Buckeyes football team =

American college football season

1931 Ohio State Buckeyes football
- Conference: Big Ten Conference
- Record: 6–3 (4–2 Big Ten)
- Head coach: Sam Willaman (3rd season)
- Captain: Stu Holcomb
- Home stadium: Ohio Stadium

1931 Big Ten Conference football standings
	Conf.					Overall
Team	W		L		T	W		L		T
No. 10 Purdue +	5	–	1	–	0	9	–	1	–	0
Michigan +	5	–	1	–	0	8	–	1	–	1
No. 4 Northwestern +	5	–	1	–	0	7	–	1	–	1
Ohio State	4	–	2	–	0	6	–	3	–	0
Minnesota	3	–	2	–	0	7	–	3	–	0
Wisconsin	3	–	3	–	0	5	–	4	–	1
Indiana	1	–	4	–	1	2	–	5	–	1
Chicago	1	–	4	–	0	2	–	6	–	1
Iowa	0	–	3	–	1	1	–	6	–	1
Illinois	0	–	6	–	0	2	–	6	–	0
+ – Conference co-champions; Rankings from Dickinson System

The 1931 Ohio State Buckeyes football team was an American football team that represented Ohio State University during the 1931 college football season as a member of the Big Ten Conference. In their third year under head coach Sam Willaman, the team compiled an overall record of 6–3, with a mark of 4–2 in conference play.

== Schedule ==
Date	Opponent	Site	Result	Attendance	Source
October 3	Cincinnati*	Ohio Stadium; Columbus, OH	W 67–6	15,699	
October 10	Vanderbilt*	Ohio Stadium; Columbus, OH	L 21–26	24,920	
October 17	at Michigan	Michigan Stadium; Ann Arbor, MI (rivalry)	W 20–7	58,026	
October 24	Northwestern	Ohio Stadium; Columbus, OH	L 0–10	41,455	
October 31	at Indiana	Memorial Stadium; Bloomington, IN	W 13–6	20,000	
November 7	Navy*	Ohio Stadium; Columbus, OH	W 20–0	60,640	
November 14	at Wisconsin	Camp Randall Stadium; Madison, WI	W 6–0	35,000	
November 21	Illinois	Ohio Stadium; Columbus, OH (Illibuck)	W 40–0	20,642	
November 28	at Minnesota	Memorial Stadium; Minneapolis, MN	L 7–19	25,000	
*Non-conference game
