= Ookie Miller =

American football player (1909–2002)

- Miller in 1936 striking a defensive pose

No. 76, 25, 48
- Positions: Center; Linebacker

Personal information
- Born: November 11, 1909; Marion, Indiana, U.S.
- Died: August 7, 2002 (aged 92); Hudson, Florida, U.S.
- Listed height: 6 ft 0 in (1.83 m)
- Listed weight: 209 lb (95 kg)

Career information
- High school: Marion (IN)
- College: Purdue

Career history
- Chicago Bears (1932–1936); Cleveland Rams (1937); Green Bay Packers (1938)

Awards and highlights
- 2× NFL champion (1932, 1933); First-team All-Pro (1933); First-team All-American (1931); Second-team All-Big Ten (1930); Shrine Bowl (1932)

Career statistics
- Games played: 82
- Games started: 39
- Touchdowns: 1
- Stats at Pro Football Reference

Charles Lewis "Ookie" Miller (November 11, 1909 – August 7, 2002) was an American professional football player. Miller played seven years in the National Football League (NFL), mainly for the Chicago Bears.

Miller was the starting center for Chicago in the 1933 NFL Championship Game, a game won by the Bears over the New York Giants, 23–21.
