= 1931 All-Big Ten Conference football team =

American college football all-star team

The 1931 All-Big Ten Conference football team consists of American football players selected to the All-Big Ten Conference teams chosen by various selectors for the 1931 Big Ten Conference football season.

== All Big-Ten selections ==
=== Ends ===
- Paul Moss, Purdue (AP-1, CPT, UP-1)
- Ivy Williamson, Michigan (AP-1, UP-1)
- Bill Hewitt, Michigan (AP-2, CPT, UP-1 [halfback])
- Bradbury N. Robinson III, Minnesota (AP-2)
- Dick Fencl, Northwestern (UP-2)
- Ted Petoskey, Michigan (UP-2)

=== Tackles ===
- Jack Riley, Northwestern (AP-1, CPT, UP-1)
- Dallas Marvil, Northwestern (AP-1, CPT, UP-1)
- William M. Bell, Ohio State (AP-2)
- Pat Boland, Minnesota (AP-2)
- Howie Auer, Michigan (UP-2)

=== Guards ===
- Biggie Munn, Minnesota (AP-1, CPT, UP-1
- Greg Kabat, Wisconsin (AP-1, CPT, UP-2 [tackle])
- Joe Zeller, Indiana (AP-2, UP-1)
- James R. Evans, Northwestern (AP-2)
- Sam Horwitz, Chicago (UP-2)
- Joseph T. Gailus, Ohio State (UP-2)

=== Centers ===
- Maynard Morrison, Michigan (AP-1, CPT, UP-2)
- Ookie Miller, Purdue (AP-2, UP-1)

=== Quarterbacks ===
- Carl Cramer, Ohio State (AP-1, CPT, UP-1)
- Harry Newman, Michigan (AP-2)
- Paul Pardonner, Purdue (UP-2)

=== Halfbacks ===
- Pug Rentner, Northwestern (AP-1, CPT, UP-1)
- Lew Hinchman, Ohio State (AP-1)
- Jim Purvis, Purdue (CPT)
- Stanley Fay, Michigan (AP-2, UP-2)
- Fred Hecker, Purdue (AP-2, UP-2)

=== Fullbacks ===
- Jack Manders, Minnesota (AP-1, CPT, UP-1)
- Ollie Olson, Northwestern (AP-2, UP-2)

== Key ==
AP = Associated Press

CPT = Captain's team, chosen by votes of captains of Big Ten football teams

UP = United Press

Bold = Consensus first-team selection of the AP and UP

== See also ==
- 1931 College Football All-America Team
