= Harry Kipke =

American athlete and coach (1899–1972)

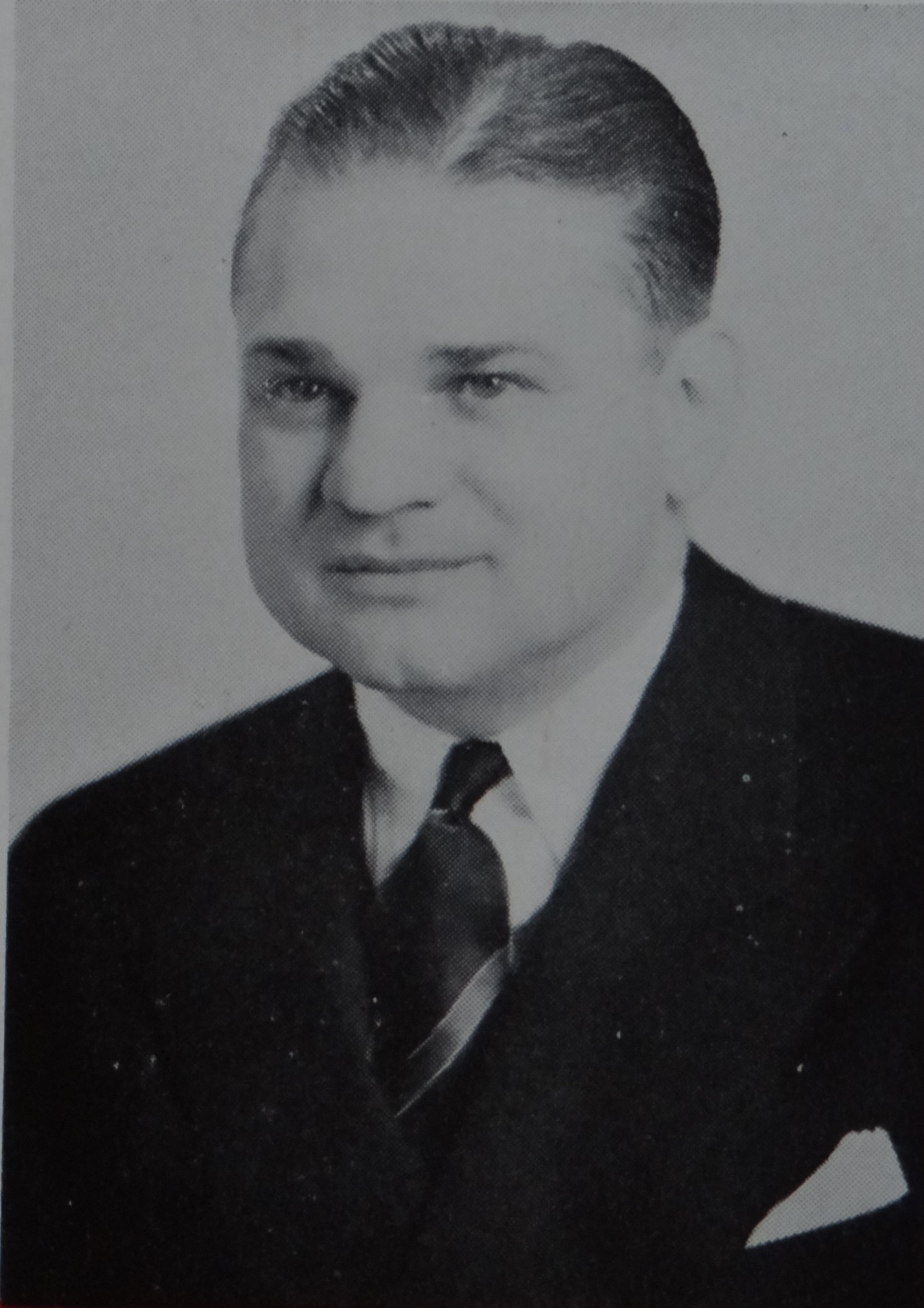

Biographical details
- Born: March 26, 1899; Lansing, Michigan, U.S.
- Died: September 14, 1972 (aged 73); Port Huron, Michigan, U.S.

Playing career

Football
- 1920–1923: Michigan

Basketball
- 1921–1924: Michigan

Baseball
- 1922–1924: Michigan
- Positions: Halfback, punter (football); Forward, guard (basketball)

Coaching career (HC unless noted)

Football
- 1924–1927: Missouri (assistant)
- 1928: Michigan State
- 1929–1937: Michigan

Baseball
- 1925: Missouri

Head coaching record
- Overall: 49–30–5 (football); 9–8 (baseball)

Accomplishments and honors

Championships
- As coach: 2 National (1932–1933); 4 Big Ten (1930–1933); As player: National (1923)

Awards
- Basketball: All-American, 1924; Football: Walter Camp Man of the Year (1970); Consensus All-American (1922); 2× First-team All-Big Ten (1922, 1923)
- College Football Hall of Fame; Inducted in 1958 (profile)

Harry George Kipke (/ˈkɪp.kiː/; March 26, 1899 – September 14, 1972) was an American football, basketball, and baseball player and coach. He was the head football coach at Michigan State College in 1928 and at the University of Michigan from 1929 to 1937, compiling a career record of 49–30–5. During his nine-year tenure as head coach at Michigan, Kipke's teams compiled a 46–26–4 record, won four conference titles, and captured two national championships in 1932 and 1933. He is one of only three coaches, along with Fielding H. Yost and Bo Schembechler, in Michigan football history to direct teams to four consecutive conference championships. Kipke was also the head baseball coach at the University of Missouri for one season 1925 while he was an assistant football coach at the school. He was inducted into of the College Football Hall of Fame as a player in 1958.

== Early years ==
Kipke was born in Lansing, Michigan, in March 1899. His father, Charles W. Kipke, emigrated from Germany to the United States in 1872. His mother, Minnie Kipke, emigrated from Germany in 1888. Kipke had two older sisters (Lena and Marie), an older brother (William), and three younger brothers (Herbert, Walter, and Ray). At the time of the 1910 United States census, the family was living in Lansing, and the father was working as an assembler in a motor works. Kipke attended Lansing High School. By 1920, Kipke's father had died, and he was living with his mother and siblings in Lansing.

== University of Michigan ==
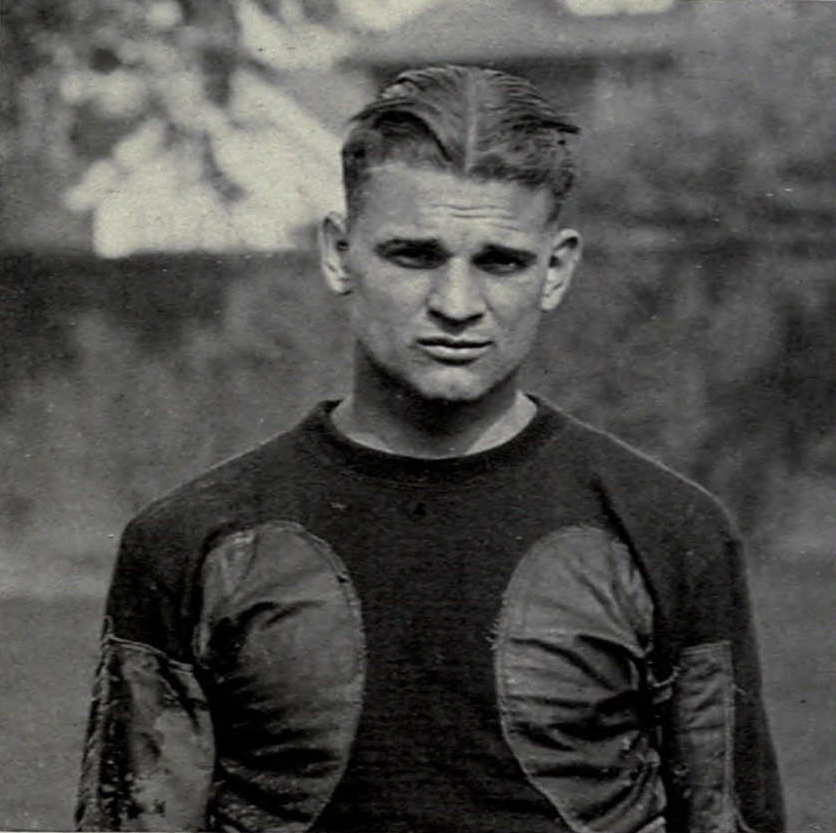
Kipke in 1922

Kipke attended the University of Michigan. He is one of the few individuals in Michigan Wolverines history to have been a letterman nine times, doing so in football, basketball, and baseball. Kipke played halfback and punter for the football team under head coach Fielding H. Yost. He was named an All-American in 1922 and is regarded as one of the school's all-time greats as a punter. His ability to punt out of bounds near the opposition's goal line helped Michigan to a 19–1–2 record from 1921 through 1923. Kipke was also the captain of the 1923 Michigan team that went 8–0 and won a national title. Kipke wore number 6 and weighed 158 pounds.

== Coaching career ==
After serving as an assistant coach at the University of Missouri for four years, Kipke was named the head football coach at Michigan State University in 1928. Michigan State had a 3–4–1 record in 1928. The following year, Kipke was hired to take over as head football coach for the Michigan Wolverines.

In his first year as head coach in 1929, the Wolverines struggled, finishing in an eight place tie in Big Ten Conference with a 5–3–1 record. But Kipke quickly turned things around, leading the Wolverines to four straight conference championships and two national titles between 1930 and 1933. The 1932 and 1933 national championships teams did not lose any games, and featured All-Americans Harry Newman, Charles T. Bernard, Ted Petoskey, and Francis Wistert.

Kipke called his system "a punt, a pass, and a prayer" in a 1933 article for The Saturday Evening Post. He also reportedly coined the phrase, "A great defense is a great offense."

In 1934, Kipke's Wolverines fell from national champions to a tenth-place finish in the conference with a 1–7 record. The one bright spot in the Wolverines 1934 season was the play of the team's most valuable player, center and future President of the United States, Gerald Ford. Ford lacked the money to attend the university, but Kipke's assistance helped him to do so. The principal of Ford's high school wrote to Kipke and invited him to Grand Rapids to meet Ford. Kipke accepted the invitation and met with Ford and his family. Though there were no opportunities to obtain scholarships on the basis of playing football at the time, Kipke helped Ford find a job at the university hospital waiting on tables to earn his meals. Ford later called the opportunity to go to U of M "the luckiest break I ever had." In a 1975 speech, Ford recalled losing seven out of eight games in 1934, including a 34–0 loss to Ohio State. Ford joked that "what really hurt me the most was when my teammates voted me their most valuable player. I didn't know whether to smile or sue."

Between 1934 and 1937, Kipke's team accumulated a 10–22 record. Kipke resigned after the 1937 season and was replaced by Fritz Crisler. Before resigning, Kipke recruited Tom Harmon to play at Michigan and advised the future Heisman Trophy winner to stay with Michigan despite the coaching change.

== After coaching ==
From 1940 to 1947, Kipke was a member of the Board of Regents of the University of Michigan. In 1942, he joined the United States Navy and later became president of the Coca-Cola Company of Chicago. Kipke was inducted into of the College Football Hall of Fame in 1958 and the Michigan Sports Hall of Fame in 1968. In September 1972, Kipke died at a hospital in Port Huron, Michigan, where he had lived for several years. Two days after he died, the crowd at Michigan Stadium stood in a moment of silence during halftime in honor of Kipke. Students, alumni, and fans can continue to remember Kipke's impact and achievements at Michigan as they walk past Kipke Drive, named after him, just outside Michigan Stadium ("The Big House").

== Head coaching record ==
Year	Team	Overall	Conference	Standing	Bowl/playoffs
Michigan State Spartans (Independent) (1928)
1928	Michigan State	3–4–1			
Michigan State:		3–4–1			
Michigan Wolverines (Big Ten Conference) (1929–1937)
1929	Michigan	5–3–1	1–3–1	T–8th	
1930	Michigan	8–0–1	5–0	T–1st	
1931	Michigan	8–1–1	5–1	T–1st	
1932	Michigan	8–0	6–0	T–1st	
1933	Michigan	7–0–1	5–0–1	T–1st	
1934	Michigan	1–7	0–6	10th	
1935	Michigan	4–4	2–3	T–5th	
1936	Michigan	1–7	0–5	T–8th	
1937	Michigan	4–4	3–3	T–4th	
Michigan:		46–26–4	27–21–2		
Total:		49–30–5			
National championship Conference title Conference division title or championship game berth

== See also ==
- History of Michigan Wolverines football in the Kipke years
- List of Michigan Wolverines football All-Americans
- University of Michigan Athletic Hall of Honor
