= 1933 college football rankings =

- Season: 1933
- Bowl season: 1933–34 bowl games
- End of season champions: Michigan (Note: per Boand System, Dickinson System (received Rockne Trophy), Houlgate System, Berryman QPRS, Billingsley Report, College Football Researchers Association, Helms Athletic Foundation, National Championship Foundation, Poling System, Sagarin Ratings Elo chess method, and Sagarin Ratings Predictor method; co-champion (alongside Princeton) per Parke H. Davis (Spalding's Official Foot Ball Guide)); Ohio State (Note: per Dunkel System) (not claimed); Princeton (Note: co-champions (alongside Michigan) per Parke H. Davis (Spalding's Official Foot Ball Guide)); USC (Note: per Williamson System) (not claimed)

The 1933 college football rankings included mathematical systems operated by William F. Boand and Frank G. Dickinson. Both systems selected the undefeated Michigan Wolverines as the national champion.

The AP sportswriters' poll would not begin being published continuously until 1936. (although, the first time was a one instance publishing in 1934)

== Champions (by ranking) ==
Most major rankings (both contemporary and retroactive) have identified Michigan as the season's champion. The three exceptions were the contemporary ranking Dunkel System (which found Ohio State the champion), the contemporary Williamson System ranking (which found USC to be the champion), and ranking by Parke H. Davis for Spalding's Official Foot Ball Guide (which found Princeton to have been co-champion alongside Michigan).

- Berryman QPRS: Michigan
- Billingsley Report: Michigan
- Boand System: Michigan
- College Football Researchers Association: Michigan
- Parke H. Davis (Note: for Spalding's Official Foot Ball Guide): Michigan and Princeton (co-champions)
- Dickinson System: Michigan
- Dunkel System: Ohio State
- Helms Athletic Foundation: Michigan
- Houlgate System: Michigan
- National Championship Foundation: Michigan
- Poling System: Michigan
- Sagarin Ratings Elo chess method: Michigan
- Sagarin Ratings Predictor method: Michigan
- Williamson System: USC

Note: Boand System, Dickinson System, Dunkel System, Houlgate System, and were Williamson System given contemporarily. Parke Davis' rankings were also published soon after season. All other methods were given retroactively

== Boand System ==
The Boand System was a mathematical ranking system developed by William F. Boand and sometimes billed as the "Azzi Ratem" (as I rate 'em) system.

1. Michigan
2. Princeton
3. USC

== Dickinson System ==
Frank G. Dickinson, an economics professor at the University of Illinois, had invented the Dickinson System to rank colleges based upon their records and the strength of their opposition. The system was originally designed to rank teams in the Big Nine (later the Big Ten) conference. Chicago clothing manufacturer Jack Rissman then persuaded Dickinson to rank the nation's teams under the system, and the Rockne Memorial Trophy was awarded to the winning university.

In an AP story, the system was explained:

For each victory of a first division team over another first division team, the winner gets 30 points and the loser 15 points. For each tie between two first division teams, each team gets 12.5 points. For each victory of a first division team over a second division team, the first division winner gets 20 points and the second division loser 10 points. For each tie between two second division teams, each gets 15 points. For each tie between a first division team and a second division team, the first division team gets 15 points and the second division team gets 20 points. Then, after each team has been given its quota of points its final "score" is tabulated by taking an average on the number of games played."

Michigan (7–0–1), Minnesota (4–0–4) and Princeton (9–0) were all unbeaten, and Princeton was untied as well. Based on its schedule, Michigan was ranked highest by Professor Dickinson. As in 1932, Dickinson, an economics professor at the University of Illinois, included four Big Ten Conference teams among the best in the US. In 1933, they were Michigan, Minnesota, Ohio State, and Purdue.

Rank	Team	Record	Rating
1	Michigan	7–0–1	28.52
2	Nebraska	8–1	24.61
3	Minnesota	4–0–4	23.87
4	Pittsburgh	8–1	23.01
5	Ohio State	7–1	22.79
6	USC	10–1–1	22.61
7	Princeton	9–0	22.50
8	Oregon	9–1	22.36
9	Army	9–1	22.16
10	Purdue	6–1–1	21.88
11	Stanford	9–1–1	20.34

The Dickinson System was a mathematical rating system devised by University of Illinois economics professor Frank G. Dickinson.

1. Michigan - 28.52 points
2. Nebraska - 24.61
3. Minnesota - 23.87
4. Pittsburgh - 23.01
5. Ohio State - 22.79
6. USC - 22.61
7. Princeton - 22.50
8. (tie) Oregon - 22.16
8. (tie) Army - 22.16
10. Purdue - 21.88
11. Stanford - 20.34

== Houlgate System ==
1. Michigan
2. USC
3. Princeton
4. LSU
5. Oregon
6. Stanford
7. Minnesota
8. Duquesne
8. Nebraska
10. Centenary
11. Columbia
11. Pittsburgh

== Williamson System ==
1. USC 98.05
2. Michigan 97.58
3. Princeton 97.26
[...]
279. Montana State

== See also ==
- 1933 College Football All-America Team
