= 1933 Minnesota Golden Gophers football team =

American college football season

1933 Minnesota Golden Gophers football

Big Ten co-champion
- Conference: Big Ten Conference
- Record: 4–0–4 (2–0–4 Big Ten)
- Head coach: Bernie Bierman (2nd season)
- Offensive scheme: Single-wing
- MVP: Pug Lund
- Captain: Roy Oen
- Home stadium: Memorial Stadium

1933 Big Ten Conference football standings
| | Conf. | | | | | Overall |
| Team | W | | L | | T | W | | L | | T |
|---|---|---|---|---|---|---|---|---|---|---|
| No. 1 Michigan + | 5 | – | 0 | – | 1 | 7 | – | 0 | – | 1 |
| No. 3 Minnesota + | 2 | – | 0 | – | 4 | 4 | – | 0 | – | 4 |
| No. 5 Ohio State | 4 | – | 1 | – | 0 | 7 | – | 1 | – | 0 |
| No. 10 Purdue | 3 | – | 1 | – | 1 | 6 | – | 1 | – | 1 |
| Illinois | 3 | – | 2 | – | 0 | 5 | – | 3 | – | 0 |
| Iowa | 3 | – | 2 | – | 0 | 5 | – | 3 | – | 0 |
| Northwestern | 1 | – | 4 | – | 1 | 1 | – | 5 | – | 2 |
| Chicago | 0 | – | 3 | – | 2 | 3 | – | 3 | – | 2 |
| Indiana | 0 | – | 3 | – | 2 | 1 | – | 5 | – | 2 |
| Wisconsin | 0 | – | 5 | – | 1 | 2 | – | 5 | – | 1 |
+ – Conference co-champions; Rankings from Dickinson System

The 1933 Minnesota Golden Gophers football team represented the University of Minnesota in the 1933 Big Ten Conference football season. In their second year under head coach Bernie Bierman, the Golden Gophers compiled a 4–0–4 record and outscored their opponents by a combined total of 64 to 32.

Halfback Pug Lund was selected for the team's Most Valuable Player award. Tackle Marshall Wells was named All-Big Ten first team. Fullback John Baumgartner was named Academic All-Big Ten.

Total attendance for the season was 164,301, which averaged to 27,384. The season high for attendance at Memorial Stadium was 45,000 against Iowa.

== Schedule ==
| Date | Opponent | Site | Result | Attendance | Source |
|---|---|---|---|---|---|
| September 30 | South Dakota State* | Memorial Stadium; Minneapolis, MN | W 19–6 | 25,000 | |
| October 7 | Indiana | Memorial Stadium; Minneapolis, MN | T 6–6 | 20,000 | |
| October 14 | Purdue | Memorial Stadium; Minneapolis, MN | T 7–7 | 26,497 | |
| October 21 | Pittsburgh* | Memorial Stadium; Minneapolis, MN | W 7–3 | 26,000 | |
| October 28 | Iowa^{†} | Memorial Stadium; Minneapolis, MN (rivalry) | W 19–7 | 45,000 | |
| November 4 | at Northwestern | Dyche Stadium; Evanston, IL | T 0–0 | 35,000 | |
| November 18 | at Michigan | Michigan Stadium; Ann Arbor, MI (Little Brown Jug) | T 0–0 | 52,137 | |
| November 25 | Wisconsin | Memorial Stadium; Minneapolis, MN (rivalry) | W 6–3 | 25,000 | |
*Non-conference game; ^{†}Homecoming

== Game summaries ==
=== Michigan ===
Week 7: Minnesota at Michigan

| Team | 1 | 2 | 3 | 4 | Total |
|---|---|---|---|---|---|
| Minnesota | 0 | 0 | 0 | 0 | 0 |
| Michigan | 0 | 0 | 0 | 0 | 0 |

- Date: November 18, 1933
- Location: Michigan Stadium
  Ann Arbor, Michigan
- Game attendance: 65,000
- Referee: Frank Birch

On November 18, 1933, Minnesota played Michigan. Minnesota had two weeks to prepare for the Wolverines following a bye week. The game ended in a scoreless tie. Each team attempted three passes, and neither team completed any. Two of Michigan's three pass attempts were intercepted by Minnesota. Bierman's Golden Gophers also held Michigan to 58 rushing yards. Michigan's best scoring opportunity was set up by a Statue of Liberty play in which Bill Renner dropped back to pass and cocked his arm to throw. Stanley Fay ran behind Renner and took the ball from Renner's extended hand. Fay ran around the end and eluded one tackler before being tackled by Vernal Levoir and Pug Lund at the Gophers' 30-yard line. Michigan was unable to penetrate further. Minnesota gained 132 yards on the ground, mostly by left halfback Pug Lund. In the third quarter, Lund ran for a 42-yard gain, and in the fourth quarter, he ran from kick formation, taking the ball to Michigan's 38-yard line. Two plays later, Minnesota fullback Vernal Levoir took the ball to Michigan's 16-yard line. When Michigan held Minnesota on three plays, Bill Bevan attempted a field goal from the 25-yard line. The kick went wide, and Minnesota's best scoring chance was lost.

After the game, Michigan coach Harry Kipke told reporters: "We got off easy. . . . Minnesota has a great football team, and it is only fair to say we were lucky to hold them scoreless. . . . Our offense probably would have looked better on a dry field. Everhadus is our only hard driving back, while Minnesota has three, . . . Our other ball carriers depend on sidestepping to go places and they couldn't do much of that with the footing so slippery." One sports columnist wrote: "No game I have seen this season more clearly brought out the inestimable value of consistent punting as did this bruise and batter struggle . . . No matter where Michigan was located when Johnny Regeczi went back to kick, the boot almost always was good enough to place Minnesota on the defensive."

The tie snapped a 16-game winning streak for Kipke's Wolverines dating back to November 14, 1931. Bierman's Golden Gophers went on to undefeated national championship seasons in 1934 and 1935.
