= 1933 Indiana Hoosiers football team =

American college football season

1933 Indiana Hoosiers football
- Conference: Big Ten Conference
- Record: 1–5–2 (0–3–2 Big Ten)
- Head coach: Earl C. Hayes (3rd season)
- MVP: Bobby Jones
- Captain: Bobby Jones
- Home stadium: Memorial Stadium

1933 Big Ten Conference football standings
	Conf.					Overall
Team	W		L		T	W		L		T
No. 1 Michigan +	5	–	0	–	1	7	–	0	–	1
No. 3 Minnesota +	2	–	0	–	4	4	–	0	–	4
No. 5 Ohio State	4	–	1	–	0	7	–	1	–	0
No. 10 Purdue	3	–	1	–	1	6	–	1	–	1
Illinois	3	–	2	–	0	5	–	3	–	0
Iowa	3	–	2	–	0	5	–	3	–	0
Northwestern	1	–	4	–	1	1	–	5	–	2
Chicago	0	–	3	–	2	3	–	3	–	2
Indiana	0	–	3	–	2	1	–	5	–	2
Wisconsin	0	–	5	–	1	2	–	5	–	1
+ – Conference co-champions; Rankings from Dickinson System

The 1933 Indiana Hoosiers football team represented the Indiana Hoosiers in the 1933 Big Ten Conference football season. The participated as members of the Big Ten Conference. The Hoosiers played their home games at Memorial Stadium in Bloomington, Indiana. The team was coached by Earl C. Hayes, in his third and final year as head coach of the Hoosiers.

== Schedule ==
Date	Opponent	Site	Result	Attendance	Source
September 30	Miami (OH)*	Memorial Stadium; Bloomington, IN	W 7–0		
October 7	at Minnesota	Memorial Stadium; Minneapolis, MN	T 6–6	20,000	
October 14	Notre Dame*	Memorial Stadium; Bloomington, IN	L 2–12	15,152	
October 21	at Northwestern	Dyche Stadium; Evanston, IL	L 0–25	15,000	
November 4	at Ohio State	Ohio Stadium; Columbus, OH	L 0–21	23,698	
November 11	at Chicago	Stagg Field; Chicago, IL	T 7–7		
November 18	at Xavier*	Corcoran Field; Cincinnati, OH	L 0–6		
November 25	Purdue	Memorial Stadium; Bloomington, IN (Old Oaken Bucket)	L 3–19	18,000	
*Non-conference game
