= 1933 Big Ten Conference football season =

- Sport: Football
- Number of teams: 10
- Co-champions: Michigan, Minnesota
- Season MVP: Joe Laws

Football seasons
- ← 1932 1934 →

1933 Big Ten Conference football standings
	Conf.					Overall
Team	W		L		T	W		L		T
No. 1 Michigan +	5	–	0	–	1	7	–	0	–	1
No. 3 Minnesota +	2	–	0	–	4	4	–	0	–	4
No. 5 Ohio State	4	–	1	–	0	7	–	1	–	0
No. 10 Purdue	3	–	1	–	1	6	–	1	–	1
Illinois	3	–	2	–	0	5	–	3	–	0
Iowa	3	–	2	–	0	5	–	3	–	0
Northwestern	1	–	4	–	1	1	–	5	–	2
Chicago	0	–	3	–	2	3	–	3	–	2
Indiana	0	–	3	–	2	1	–	5	–	2
Wisconsin	0	–	5	–	1	2	–	5	–	1
+ – Conference co-champions; Rankings from Dickinson System

The 1933 Big Ten Conference football season was the 38th season of college football played by the member schools of the Big Ten Conference (also known as the Western Conference) and was a part of the 1933 college football season.

Michigan compiled a 7–0–1 record, extended its unbeaten streak to 22 games, shut out five of eight opponents, gave up an average of 2.3 points per game, outscored opponents 131 to 18, and was the Big Ten champion. In December 1933, Michigan was awarded the Knute K. Rockne Trophy as the No. 1 team in the country under the Dickinson System. Two other Big Ten teams also finished among the top five teams in the post-season Dickinson ratings: Minnesota at No. 3 and Ohio State at No. 5. Center Chuck Bernard and tackle Francis Wistert were consensus first-team picks for the 1933 College Football All-America Team.

Ohio State finished in third place with a 7–1 and its sole loss being against Michigan.

Iowa quarterback/halfback Joe Laws received the Chicago Tribune Silver Football trophy as the most valuable player in the conference.

== Season overview ==
=== Results and team statistics ===
Conf. Rank	Team	Head coach	DS	Overall record	Conf. record	PPG	PAG	MVP
1 (tie)	Michigan	Harry Kipke	#1	7–0–1	5–0–1	16.4	2.3	H. Everhardus
1 (tie)	Minnesota	Bernie Bierman	#3	4-0-4	2-0-4	8.0	4.0	Pug Lund
3	Ohio State	Sam Willaman	#5	7–1	4–1	20.1	3.3	M. Vuchinich
4	Purdue	Noble Kizer	#10	6–1–1	3–1–1	13.6	4.6	Fred Hecker
5 (tie)	Illinois	Robert Zuppke	NR	5–3	3–2	9.6	4.0	Dave Cook
5 (tie)	Iowa	Ossie Solem	NR	5–3	3–2	16.4	7.0	Joe Laws
7	Northwestern	Dick Hanley	NR	1–5–2	1–4–1	3.1	5.3	Ed Manske
8	Chicago	C. Shaughnessy	NR	3–3–2	0–3–2	14.8	7.0	Jay Berwanger
9	Indiana	Earl C. Hayes	NR	1–5–2	0–3–2	3.1	12.0	Bob Jones
10	Wisconsin	Clarence Spears	NR	2–5–1	0–5–1	6.8	9.9	Robert Schiller

Key
DS = Ranking in the Dickinson System, a system used at the time to rank the country's best college football teams and to award the Knute Rockne Trophy to the national champion
PPG = Average of points scored per game
PAG = Average of points allowed per game
MVP = Most valuable player as voted by players on each team as part of the voting process to determine the winner of the Chicago Tribune Silver Football trophy

== All-conference players ==
The following players received first-team honors from either the Associated Press (AP) or United Press (UP) on the 1933 All-Big Ten Conference football team:

- Ted Petoskey, end, Michigan (AP, UP)
- Frank Larson, end, Minnesota (AP, UP)
- Whitey Wistert, tackle, Michigan (AP, UP)
- Ted Rosequist, tackle, Ohio State (UP)
- Dutch Fehring, tackle, Purdue (AP)
- Zud Schammel, guard, Iowa (AP, UP)
- Joseph T. Gailus, guard, Ohio State (AP, UP)
- Chuck Bernard, center, Michigan (UP)
- Jack Beynon, quarterback, Illinois (UP)
- Joe Laws, quarterback/halfback, Iowa (AP, UP)
- Pug Lund, halfback, Minnesota (AP, UP)
- Herman Everhardus, halfback, Michigan (AP)
- Duane Purvis, fullback, Purdue (AP, UP)

== All-Americans ==
Three Big Ten players were consensus first-team picks on the 1933 College Football All-America Team:

- Chuck Bernard, center, Michigan (AAB, AP, CO, FWAA, INS, LIB, NANA, NEA, UP, CP, DJW, MP, NYS, WC, WD)
- Francis Wistert, tackle, Michigan (AAB, CO, FWAA, UP, DJW, NYS, WC)
- Duane Purvis, fullback, Purdue (AAB, CO, LIB, NANA, UP, WC, WD)

Other Big Ten players receiving first-team All-American honors from at least one selector were:

- Ted Petoskey, end, Michigan (INS, CP, MP)
- Frank Larson, end, Minnesota (CO, NEA, NYS)
- Edgar Manske, end, Northwestern (UP)
- Zud Schammel, guard, Iowa (AP, LIB, NANA, UP)
- Joseph Gailus, guard, Ohio State (MP)
- Pug Lund, halfback, Minnesota (AP, FWAA, INS, CP, DJW, MP)
