= 1933 Illinois Fighting Illini football team =

American college football season

1933 Illinois Fighting Illini football
- Conference: Big Ten Conference
- Record: 5–3 (3–2 Big Ten)
- Head coach: Robert Zuppke (21st season)
- MVP: Dave Cook
- Captain: Herman Walser
- Home stadium: Memorial Stadium

1933 Big Ten Conference football standings
	Conf.					Overall
Team	W		L		T	W		L		T
No. 1 Michigan +	5	–	0	–	1	7	–	0	–	1
No. 3 Minnesota +	2	–	0	–	4	4	–	0	–	4
No. 5 Ohio State	4	–	1	–	0	7	–	1	–	0
No. 10 Purdue	3	–	1	–	1	6	–	1	–	1
Illinois	3	–	2	–	0	5	–	3	–	0
Iowa	3	–	2	–	0	5	–	3	–	0
Northwestern	1	–	4	–	1	1	–	5	–	2
Chicago	0	–	3	–	2	3	–	3	–	2
Indiana	0	–	3	–	2	1	–	5	–	2
Wisconsin	0	–	5	–	1	2	–	5	–	1
+ – Conference co-champions; Rankings from Dickinson System

The 1933 Illinois Fighting Illini football team was an American football team that represented the University of Illinois during the 1933 Big Ten Conference football season. In their 21st season under head coach Robert Zuppke, the Illini compiled a 5–3 record and finished in a tie for fifth place in the Big Ten Conference. Fullback Dave Cook was selected as the team's most valuable player. Fullback Herman Walser was the team captain.

== Schedule ==
Date	Time	Opponent	Site	Result	Attendance	Source
September 30		Drake*	Memorial Stadium; Champaign, IL	W 13–6	25,788	
October 7	2:30 p.m.	at Washington University*	Francis Field; St. Louis, MO	W 21–6	8,776–11,220	
October 14		Wisconsin	Memorial Stadium; Champaign, IL	W 21–0	19,810	
October 21		vs. Army*	Cleveland, OH	L 0–6	28,495	
November 4		Michigan	Memorial Stadium; Champaign, IL (rivalry)	L 6–7	20,405	
November 11		at Northwestern	Dyche Stadium; Evanston, IL (rivalry)	W 3–0	27,269–37,000	
November 18		Chicago	Memorial Stadium; Champaign, IL	W 7–0	8,135	
November 25		at Ohio State	Ohio Stadium; Columbus, OH (Illibuck)	L 6–7	24,403	
*Non-conference game; All times are in Central time
