= Jack Robinson (tackle) =

American football player (1911–2001)

No. 22, 49, 40, 29, 19
- Position: Tackle

Personal information
- Born: June 18, 1911; Miami, New Mexico, U.S.
- Died: April 27, 2001 (aged 89); Springer, New Mexico, U.S.
- Listed height: 6 ft 2 in (1.88 m)
- Listed weight: 220 lb (100 kg)

Career information
- College: Kirksville

Career history
- Brooklyn Dodgers (1935–1936); Chicago Cardinals (1936–1937); Pittsburgh Pirates (1938); Cleveland Rams (1938)
- Stats at Pro Football Reference

John "Jack" Robinson (June 18, 1911 – April 27, 2001) was an American professional football tackle who played in the National Football League (NFL) with the Brooklyn Dodgers, Chicago Cardinals, Pittsburgh Pirates, and Cleveland Rams. He played college football for the Kirksville Bulldogs.

== Early life ==
John Robinson was born on June 18, 1911, in Miami, New Mexico. He played college football for the Bulldogs of Kirksville State Teachers College.

== Professional career ==
Robinson signed with the Brooklyn Dodgers on August 23, 1935. He played in eight games for the Dodgers during the 1935 season as a reserve tackle. On August 24, 1936, he re-signed with Brooklyn for the 1936 season. Robinson played in the first three games for the Dodgers in 1936 in a backup role.

On October 8, 1936, Robinson was traded to the Chicago Cardinals for Dave Cook. Robinson appeared in eight games for the Cardinals that year as a reserve tackle. He played in all 11 games, starting 10, for Chicago in 1937 as the team went 5–5–1.

Robinson joined the Pittsburgh Pirates during the 1938 offseason. He played in two games, starting one, for the Pirates before being released.

Robinson signed with the Cleveland Rams on October 11, 1938, after the team released John Giannoni. Robinson played in six games, starting one, for the Rams during the 1938 season and was listed as a guard. He was not re-signed in 1939.

== Personal life ==
Robinson died on April 27, 2001, in Springer, New Mexico.
