= William Renner =

American football player and coach (1910–1969)

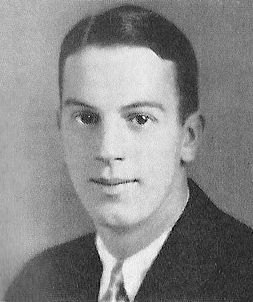

Profile
- Position: Quarterback

Personal information
- Born: September 16, 1910
- Died: July 5, 1969 (aged 58)

Career information
- College: University of Michigan

Career history
- 1931–1935: Michigan

Awards and highlights
- National champion (1933)

William Wilford Renner (September 16, 1910 – July 5, 1969) was an American football player. He played at the quarterback position for the University of Michigan teams from 1931 to 1935. He was a member of the undefeated national champion 1933 Michigan football team also the captain of the 1935 Michigan football team.

== University of Michigan ==
Renner was a native of Youngstown, Ohio, the son of Emil and Mary Renner. He enrolled at the University of Michigan in 1930 where he was on the football roster for parts of five seasons from 1931 to 1935. Injuries and illnesses prevented kept Renner out of the lineup in 1931 and 1932. He was one of the lightest players on the team at 165 pounds and six feet tall, and he developed a reputation as "a 'fragile' athlete."

=== 1933 season ===
Following the graduation of Michigan's Hall of Fame quarterback Harry Newman, Renner was expected to be Michigan's starting quarterback in 1933. At the beginning of the 1933 football season, the Associated Press reported that Renner had the talent to be a better quarterback than either of Michigan's great quarterbacks, Newman and Benny Friedman. The AP noted: "Western Conference coaches whose football teams will battle Michigan this Fall have passed out word that they fear Bill Renner, of Youngstown, O., quarterback candidate, will be another Harry Newman 'or even worse.' ... Observers who saw Ben Friedman and Newman throughout their forward passing careers at Michigan maintain that Renner is the best ball tosser the Maize and Blue ever had." Renner won the starting quarterback job in 1933, and expectations ran high as reflected in the following newspaper profile:

"A slender youth from Youngstown, Ohio who specializes in throwing a pigskin to exactly the right place at exactly the right time is the center of attention on Michigan's 1933 team. ... Kipke again has an 'ace in the hole,' an undercover star, to make Wolverine fans forget Bennie Friedman and Harry Newman. Renner throws long ones and short ones, high 'soft' ones and the other kind that go with baseball speed. He heaves them backing up or running toward the sidelines, all with deadly accuracy and timing."

Renner's playing time was again limited in 1933 due to injuries and illness, and he started only one game for the Wolverines. In the 1933 Michigan-Ohio State game, played before the largest crowd to see a Big Ten Conference football game to that date, Renner came into the game at the end of the first half and ran the ball for a game-winning touchdown. An Associated Press story described Renner's impact in the scoring drive against Ohio State: "When he finally trotted out on the gridiron, the consternation of the Buckeyes was obvious to the 93,508 spectators. The defensive halfbacks backed away from the line, the center and fullback retreated and rubbed their hands, the linemen raised their heads." Renner led the Wolverines from midfield and, with the ball at the three-yard line, Renner "rolled around tackle for the touchdown that made it Michigan's afternoon."

=== 1934 season ===
Renner with future U.S. President Gerald Ford while both were assistant coaches at Yale, 1939

After the 1933 season, Renner developed appendicitis and was again forced to leave school. By the fall of 1934, most of the players with whom Renner had entered the university in 1930 (Herman Everhardus, Chuck Bernard, and Whitey Wistert) had graduated. Renner returned to Ann Arbor in September 1934 and was expected, finally, to be Michigan's starting quarterback. Michigan's offense in 1934 was sometimes referred to as "Punt, Pass and Prayer." A September 1934 newspaper story described Renner's role in the system:

"A punt, a pass and a prayer. By Harry Kipke's own words, that's all they have over there. But when it's a Regeczi punting, a Renner passing, and a typical Michigan squad of good ends, good tackles, good guards, and a great center 'preying', how are you going to stop them?"

However, Renner broke his ankle during the first Saturday practice scrimmage in the fall of 1934 and was unable to play in any games that year. Renner's repeated injuries and illnesses won the nickname "Hard Luck Bill." Renner was teammates with John Regeczi and Gerald Ford, who later served as the U.S. President, on the Michigan teams from 1932 to 1934. In a 1994 interview, Ford described the impact on the 1934 team of losing Renner to injury:

"In '32 and '33, we were undefeated, and then in '34 we had a tough, tough year. In those years, our offense was called a punt, a pass, and a prayer. We had an outstanding passer, Bill Renner, who broke an ankle before the season started. Our punter, John Regeczi, was the greatest college punter I ever saw and he ruined his knee. All we had left was the prayer."

The 1934 team finished with a 1–7 record. Ford was selected as the Most Valuable Player on the 1934 team.

=== 1935 season ===
Despite the fact that he was unable to play a minute of football in 1934, the Michigan team voted at the end of 1934 season to make Renner the captain of the 1935 team. During the 1935 season, Renner was Michigan's starting quarterback for all eight of its games. With Renner as captain, the team got off to a 4–1 start but finished the season with three straight losses (to Illinois, Minnesota and Ohio State) in which the Wolverines were unable to score a point.

== Coach ==
In 1936, Renner was hired as an assistant football coach under head coach Ducky Pond at Yale University. Renner was responsible for coaching Yale's backs in passing and kicking. In 1937, Renner and his former Michigan teammate Gerald Ford were charged with coaching Yale's junior varsity football team.

Renner married Leah Margaret "Marnie" McKelvey on August 12, 1939. A resident of Bronxville, New York, Renner died of a cerebral hemorrhage on July 5, 1969.
