= 1933 Wisconsin Badgers football team =

American college football season

1933 Wisconsin Badgers football
- Conference: Big Ten Conference
- Record: 2–5–1 (0–5–1 Big Ten)
- Head coach: Clarence Spears (2nd season)
- MVP: Robert Schiller
- Captain: Harold Smith
- Home stadium: Camp Randall Stadium

1933 Big Ten Conference football standings
	Conf.					Overall
Team	W		L		T	W		L		T
No. 1 Michigan +	5	–	0	–	1	7	–	0	–	1
No. 3 Minnesota +	2	–	0	–	4	4	–	0	–	4
No. 5 Ohio State	4	–	1	–	0	7	–	1	–	0
No. 10 Purdue	3	–	1	–	1	6	–	1	–	1
Illinois	3	–	2	–	0	5	–	3	–	0
Iowa	3	–	2	–	0	5	–	3	–	0
Northwestern	1	–	4	–	1	1	–	5	–	2
Chicago	0	–	3	–	2	3	–	3	–	2
Indiana	0	–	3	–	2	1	–	5	–	2
Wisconsin	0	–	5	–	1	2	–	5	–	1
+ – Conference co-champions; Rankings from Dickinson System

The 1933 Wisconsin Badgers football team was an American football team that represented the University of Wisconsin in the 1933 Big Ten Conference football season. The team compiled a 2–5–1 record (0–5–1 against conference opponents) and finished in last place in the Big Ten Conference. Clarence Spears was in his second year as Wisconsin's head coach.

Halfback Robert Schiller was selected as the team's most valuable player. Harold Smith was the team captain. No Wisconsin players received All-American or All-Big Ten honors in 1933.

The team played its home games at Camp Randall Stadium, which had a capacity of 32,700. During the 1933 season, the average attendance at home games was 13,579.

== Schedule ==
Date	Opponent	Site	Result	Attendance	Source
October 7	Marquette*	Camp Randall Stadium; Madison, WI	W 19–0	20,000	
October 14	at Illinois	Memorial Stadium; Champaign, IL	L 0–21	19,810	
October 21	at Iowa	Iowa Stadium; Iowa City, IA (rivalry)	L 7–26		
October 28	Purdue^{†}	Camp Randall Stadium; Madison, WI	L 0–14	27,000	
November 4	at Chicago	Stagg Field; Chicago, IL	T 0–0		
November 11	West Virginia*	Camp Randall Stadium; Madison, WI	W 25–6	11,000	
November 18	Ohio State	Camp Randall Stadium; Madison, WI	L 0–6	9,089	
November 25	at Minnesota	Memorial Stadium; Minneapolis, MN (rivalry)	L 3–6	25,000	
*Non-conference game; ^{†}Homecoming
