= 1933 Chicago Maroons football team =

American college football season

1933 Chicago Maroons football
- Conference: Big Ten Conference
- Record: 3–3–2 (0–3–2 Big Ten)
- Head coach: Clark Shaughnessy (1st season)
- Home stadium: Stagg Field

1933 Big Ten Conference football standings
	Conf.					Overall
Team	W		L		T	W		L		T
No. 1 Michigan +	5	–	0	–	1	7	–	0	–	1
No. 3 Minnesota +	2	–	0	–	4	4	–	0	–	4
No. 5 Ohio State	4	–	1	–	0	7	–	1	–	0
No. 10 Purdue	3	–	1	–	1	6	–	1	–	1
Illinois	3	–	2	–	0	5	–	3	–	0
Iowa	3	–	2	–	0	5	–	3	–	0
Northwestern	1	–	4	–	1	1	–	5	–	2
Chicago	0	–	3	–	2	3	–	3	–	2
Indiana	0	–	3	–	2	1	–	5	–	2
Wisconsin	0	–	5	–	1	2	–	5	–	1
+ – Conference co-champions; Rankings from Dickinson System

The 1933 Chicago Maroons football team was an American football team that represented the University of Chicago during the 1933 Big Ten Conference football season. In their first season under head coach Clark Shaughnessy, the Maroons compiled a 3–3–2 record, finished in a tie for eighth place in the Big Ten Conference, and outscored their opponents by a combined total of 118 to 56.

== Schedule ==
Date	Time	Opponent	Site	Result	Attendance	Source
October 7		Cornell (IA)*	Stagg Field; Chicago, IL	W 32–0	25,000	
October 14	2:30 p.m.	at Washington University*	Francis Field; St. Louis, MO	W 40–0	7,000	
October 21		Purdue	Stagg Field; Chicago, IL (rivalry)	L 0–14	15,000	
October 28		Michigan	Stagg Field; Chicago, IL (rivalry)	L 0–28	19,458	
November 4		Wisconsin	Stagg Field; Chicago, IL	T 0–0	15,000	
November 11		Indiana	Stagg Field; Chicago, IL	T 7–7	12,000	
November 18		at Illinois	Memorial Stadium; Champaign, IL	L 0–7	8,135	
November 25		Dartmouth*	Stagg Field; Chicago, IL	W 39–0	22,000	
*Non-conference game; All times are in Central time
