= Tony Dauksza =

American canoeist (1912–1996)

- Dauksza with canoe used to traverse Northwest Passage

Profile
- Positions: Lineman, Punter, Placekicker

Personal information
- Born: February 18, 1912; Grand Rapids, Michigan, U.S.
- Died: December 25, 1996 (aged 84); Grand Rapids, Michigan, U.S.

Career information
- College: Michigan State Spartans

Career history
- 1933: Michigan State Spartans 1932-33 Roster players

Awards and highlights
- National champion (1933)

Anthony Dauksza (February 18, 1912 – December 25, 1996) was an American football player, film-maker, and outdoorsman. In 1971, he became the first person to traverse the Northwest Passage in anything other than a ship. Dauksza completed the 3,200-mile journey over the course of six summers on a solo canoe expedition.

== Early life ==
A native of Grand Rapids, Michigan, was the captain of the Union High School football team that won the state championship in 1931. Dauksza attended Michigan State University where he played for the football team. He was an offensive and defensive lineman for the Spartans as well as a punter and placekicker (1932-1933). He sometimes has been confused with Antone "Tony" Dauksza, his cousin, who played as a quarterback for the 1933 National Champions Michigan Wolverines. Antone "Tony" Dauksza was also from Grand Rapids, Michigan. Antone Dauksza later changed his name to Antone "Tony" Dicks to avoid confusion with his cousin who played at Michigan State and was a photographer, film maker, adventurer/explorer of the Alaskan and Yukon Territories.

== Outdoorsman and film-maker ==
In the 1930s, Dauksza began a lifetime as an outdoorsman and explorer. Starting with an interest in fishing and hunting, he began canoeing in 1936. He made regular summer expeditions into Manitoba, the Northwest Territories, the Yukon, and Alaska. He eventually converted his love of the outdoors into his full-time occupation, exploring in the summers and conducting film-lectures in the winter. In the fall of 1959, Dauksza attracted the attention of a reporter for the Saskatoon Star-Phoenix as he passed through Saskatoon in his Volkswagen van (dubbed the "Volksbeast") bearing "a set of rare double-browed Caribou antlers of 393 points and a set of 63-1/2-inch moose antlers as well as several lesser trophies." The reporter published a feature story about Dauksza's adventures hunting, fishing, and filming for his "Alaska Adventure Movies" enterprise. A story on his adventures also appeared in the October 1959 issue of Outdoor Life magazine.

In 1964, he canoed 300 miles from Great Slave Lake to the Mackenzie River delta. The Arctic Ocean was iced in by the time he arrived, and Dauksza was forced to walk to an Eskimo camp. In 1965, he became the first person to canoe down the East Calendar River from the Brooks Range in northeastern Alaska. The 300-mile journey included 200 miles of white water. Dauksza recalled, "I'd just get through one rapid and I'd hear the roar of the next. There was barely time enough between rapids to bale [sic]." The Detroit Free Press in 1969 called Dauksza a latter-day Daniel Boone.

From 1966 to 1971, he completed a 3,200-mile solo canoe journey through the Northwest Passage. He was the first one-man expedition in the smallest craft to navigate the passage. Dauksza began the journey in 1966 at Point Barrow, Alaska. That summer, he canoed 600 miles to Barter Island in a 16-foot aluminum canoe that he called "The Arctic Ice Cube." He traveled with a small igloo tent, a Winchester rifle, a movie camera, and a three-horsepower engine to help him traverse the most difficult passages. In the fall of 1966, The Canadian Press published a story referring to his expedition as a "suicidal mission." Dauksza reported that his wife had accepted him as a "hopeless case" and was content to have him home in Grand Rapids in the winters where he conducted film-lectures on his adventures at churches, schools and clubs throughout Michigan and Indiana.

He returned in 1967 and was forced to backtrack to the west due to heavy ice drift. In 1968, he made it back to Barter Island. In 1969, he switched to a 19-foot aluminum canoe equipped with a four horsepower engine that he called "The Arctic Icebreaker." Dauksza had engine trouble and was blown out to sea where he drifted for three days. He experienced a close call in 1970 when he broke through the ice while dragging his canoe across an ice flow. By the end of the summer of 1970, he made it to Spence Bay. In the summer of 1971, Time-Life Broadcasts supplied him with filming equipment to document the last leg of his journey. He was iced in for 12 days but managed to complete the journey, traveling from Spence Bay to Bellot Strait east of the Canadian Arctic Archipelago at the tip of Boothia Peninsula.

Interviewed in 1972 by The Christian Science Monitor, Dauksza explained that he loved the quiet of the Arctic's enormous desolation. He lived off caribou, duck, goose and fish on his journey. He was once forced to shoot a grizzly bear that he said mistook him for a caribou. He reported having no problems with wolves: "The wolf - if you allowed him, shucks, he'd be your friend. I woke once and saw one just sitting there observing me like a dog." Interviewed in 1974 by The Canadian Press, Dauksza explained the attraction he felt for the Arctic: "People in the North are the way people should be everywhere, and the way they would be if they didn't live in cities. It's the people, and a curiosity I have always had about remote areas that makes me want to see the Arctic."

== Death ==
Dauksza died on Christmas Day 1996 at Grand Rapids, Michigan.
