= John Regeczi =

American football player (1912–2003)

Profile
- Positions: Fullback, Halfback

Personal information
- Born: July 19, 1912; Ironwood, Michigan, U.S.
- Died: July 16, 2003 (aged 90); Aurora, Colorado, U.S.

Career information
- College: University of Michigan

Awards and highlights
- National champion (1933)

John M. Regeczi (July 19, 1912 – July 16, 2003) was an American football player. He played at the fullback, halfback positions for the University of Michigan teams from 1932 to 1934, including the undefeated national championship teams of 1932 and 1933.

== Early life ==
Regeczi was born in Ironwood in Michigan's Upper Peninsula and grew up in Muskegon in the western Lower Peninsula of Michigan. He was the captain of the football and basketball teams at Muskegon Heights High School. He also set school records in the 100-yard dash, the 220-yard dash and the javelin throw. In high school, he was a running back and punter and was selected by the Detroit News as a first-team All-State football player for the State of Michigan in both 1929 and 1930.

== Michigan ==
Regeczi enrolled at the University of Michigan where he won letters in football, basketball and baseball. Regeczi played in Harry Kipke's offense that won back-to-back national championships in 1932 and 1933. Regeczi had one of his best games in a 40–0 win over Cornell in 1933, a game in which Regeczi rushed for 101 yards. Regeczi gained the majority of his yards against Cornell on an 85-yard touchdown run from punt formation in the first quarter. Regeczi also played an important role in the 1933 Michigan-Ohio State game. The game was played at Michigan Stadium in front of 93,508 fans—the largest crowd to see a Big Ten football game to that date. Regeczi kept Ohio State at bay with his punting and also playing at the fullback position. While he was regarded as a good running back, Regeczi won his greatest acclaim as a punter. In October 1933, George Kirksey, writing for the United Press, said: "Regeczi, the Hungarian halfback, is probably the greatest punter for distance and accuracy in the country ..."

Regeczi suffered a knee injury at the start of the 1934 season and had difficulty regaining his speed after the injury. He was kept in the lineup in 1934 mostly due to his punting ability. The Associated Press reported in November 1934 that after three years in the starting lineup, Regeczi "found himself in the position of battling for a starting position."

Due in part to injuries to Regeczi and quarterback Bill Renner, Kipke's offense in 1934 was sometimes referred to as "Punt, Pass and Prayer." A September 1934 newspaper story described Regeczi's role in the system:

"A punt, a pass and a prayer. By Harry Kipke's own words, that's all they have over there. But when it's a Regeczi punting, a Renner passing, and a typical Michigan squad of good ends, good tackles, good guards, and a great center 'preying', how are you going to stop them?"

Regeczi was teammates with Gerald Ford, who later served as the U.S. President, on the Michigan teams from 1932 to 1934. In 1994 interview, Ford praised Regeczi's punting in discussing the "Punt, Pass and Prayer" offense:

"In '32 and '33, we were undefeated, and then in '34 we had a tough, tough year. In those years, our offense was called a punt, a pass, and a prayer. We had an outstanding passer, Bill Renner, who broke an ankle before the season started. Our punter, John Regeczi, was the greatest college punter I ever saw and he ruined his knee. All we had left was the prayer."

Ford was selected as the Most Valuable Player on the 1934 team.

Despite the injury and limited playing time in 1934, Regeczi was selected to play on the College All‑Star team after his senior year. Regeczi and Gerald Ford were the only two Wolverines selected to play on the 1935 College All-Star team. Although the Chicago Bears beat the College All-Stars 5 to 0, Regeczi's punting was singled out for praise in the press coverage of the game: "And the punt. The game showed this weapon the important thing in football. You noticed the Bears never came close to while Regeczi was kicking."

== Later life ==
After graduating from Michigan, Regeczi turned down an offer to play professional baseball in the Detroit Tigers organization. In August 1935, he was hired to coach football at L'Anse High School in L'Anse, Michigan. He later taught and coached at Burton Junior High School in Grand Rapids, Michigan. He coached junior high school athletics for 36 years and retired in 1973.

Regeczi was inducted into the Muskegon Area Sports Hall of Fame in 1991.

Regeczi died in 2003 in Aurora, Colorado at age 90.
