= 1933 Iowa Hawkeyes football team =

American college football season

1933 Iowa Hawkeyes football
- Conference: Big Ten Conference
- Record: 5–3 (3–2 Big Ten)
- Head coach: Ossie Solem (2nd season)
- MVP: Joe Laws
- Captain: Tom Moore
- Home stadium: Iowa Stadium

1933 Big Ten Conference football standings
	Conf.					Overall
Team	W		L		T	W		L		T
No. 1 Michigan +	5	–	0	–	1	7	–	0	–	1
No. 3 Minnesota +	2	–	0	–	4	4	–	0	–	4
No. 5 Ohio State	4	–	1	–	0	7	–	1	–	0
No. 10 Purdue	3	–	1	–	1	6	–	1	–	1
Illinois	3	–	2	–	0	5	–	3	–	0
Iowa	3	–	2	–	0	5	–	3	–	0
Northwestern	1	–	4	–	1	1	–	5	–	2
Chicago	0	–	3	–	2	3	–	3	–	2
Indiana	0	–	3	–	2	1	–	5	–	2
Wisconsin	0	–	5	–	1	2	–	5	–	1
+ – Conference co-champions; Rankings from Dickinson System

The 1933 Iowa Hawkeyes football team was an American football team that represented the University of Iowa as a member of the Big Ten Conference during the 1933 Big Ten football season. In their second season under head coach Ossie Solem, the Hawkeyes compiled a 5–3 record (3–2 in conference games), tied for fifth place in the Big Ten, and outscored opponents by a total of 131 to 56.

The team played its home games at Iowa Stadium (later renamed Kinnick Stadium) in Iowa City, Iowa.

== Schedule ==
Date	Opponent	Site	Result	Attendance	Source
September 30	vs. Northwestern	Soldier Field; Chicago, IL	W 7–0	25,000	
October 7	Bradley Tech*	Iowa Stadium; Iowa City, IA	W 38–0		
October 21	Wisconsin^{†}	Iowa Stadium; Iowa City, IA (rivalry)	W 26–7		
October 28	at Minnesota	Memorial Stadium; Minneapolis, MN (rivalry)	L 7–19	45,000	
November 4	Iowa State*	Iowa Stadium; Iowa City, IA (rivalry)	W 27–7	15,685	
November 11	at Michigan	Michigan Stadium; Ann Arbor, MI	L 6–10	22,130	
November 18	at Purdue	Ross–Ade Stadium; West Lafayette, IN	W 14–6	16,000	
November 25	at Nebraska*	Memorial Stadium; Lincoln, NE (rivalry)	L 6–7	32,495	
*Non-conference game; ^{†}Homecoming
