= 1933 Northwestern Wildcats football team =

American college football season

1933 Northwestern Wildcats football
- Conference: Big Ten Conference
- Record: 1–5–2 (1–4–1 Big Ten)
- Head coach: Dick Hanley (7th season)
- Captain: Jack Heuss
- Home stadium: Dyche Stadium

1933 Big Ten Conference football standings
	Conf.					Overall
Team	W		L		T	W		L		T
No. 1 Michigan +	5	–	0	–	1	7	–	0	–	1
No. 3 Minnesota +	2	–	0	–	4	4	–	0	–	4
No. 5 Ohio State	4	–	1	–	0	7	–	1	–	0
No. 10 Purdue	3	–	1	–	1	6	–	1	–	1
Illinois	3	–	2	–	0	5	–	3	–	0
Iowa	3	–	2	–	0	5	–	3	–	0
Northwestern	1	–	4	–	1	1	–	5	–	2
Chicago	0	–	3	–	2	3	–	3	–	2
Indiana	0	–	3	–	2	1	–	5	–	2
Wisconsin	0	–	5	–	1	2	–	5	–	1
+ – Conference co-champions; Rankings from Dickinson System

The 1933 Northwestern Wildcats team represented Northwestern University during the 1933 Big Ten Conference football season. In their seventh year under head coach Dick Hanley, the Wildcats compiled a 1–5–2 record (1–4–1 against Big Ten Conference opponents) and finished in seventh place in the Big Ten Conference.

== Schedule ==
Date	Opponent	Site	Result	Attendance	Source
September 30	vs. Iowa	Soldier Field; Chicago, IL	L 0–7	25,000	
October 14	vs. Stanford*	Soldier Field; Chicago, IL	T 0–0	28,000	
October 21	Indiana	Dyche Stadium; Evanston, IL	W 25–0	15,000	
October 28	at Ohio State	Ohio Stadium; Columbus, OH	L 0–12	34,987	
November 4	Minnesota	Dyche Stadium; Evanston, IL	T 0–0	35,000	
November 11	Illinois	Dyche Stadium; Evanston, IL (rivalry)	L 0–3	37,000	
November 18	Notre Dame*	Dyche Stadium; Evanston, IL (rivalry)	L 0–7	40,000	
November 25	Michigan	Dyche Stadium; Evanston, IL (rivalry)	L 0–13	32,000	
*Non-conference game
