= Russell D. Oliver =

American athlete and coach (1910–1974)

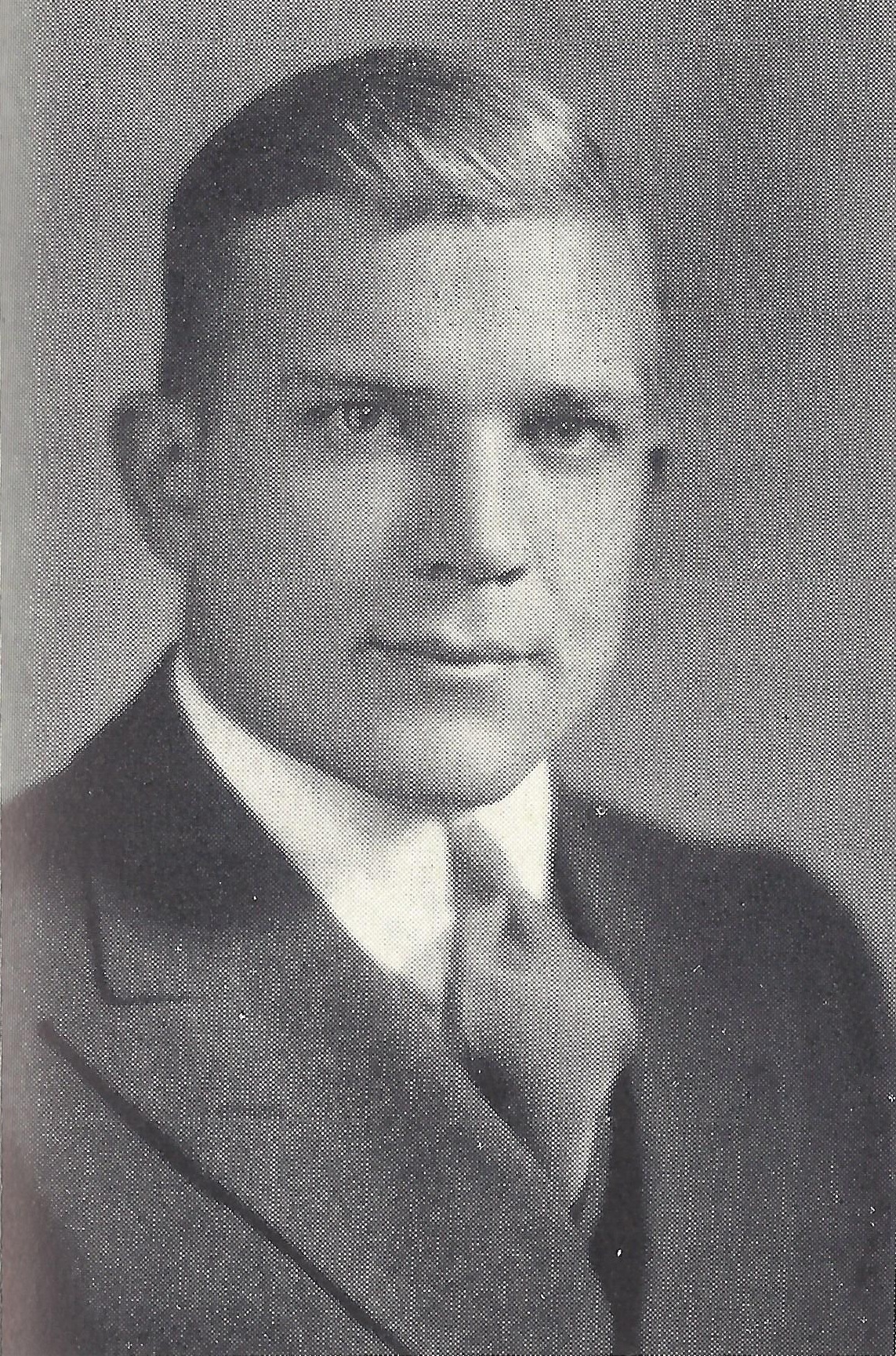

Profile
- Position: Fullback

Personal information
- Born: July 20, 1910; Pontiac, Michigan, U.S.
- Died: December 19, 1974 (aged 64); South Bend, Indiana, U.S.

Career information
- College: Michigan

Career history
- 1932–1934: Michigan Wolverines

Awards and highlights
- National champion (1933)

Russell Dwight Oliver (July 20, 1910 – December 19, 1974) was an American athlete and coach who played and coached football, baseball, and basketball. He played college football, baseball, and basketball at the University of Michigan and coached those sports at Culver Military Academy from 1935 to 1968, with a four-year interruption for military service during World War II.

== Early life ==
Oliver was born in Pontiac, Michigan, and graduated from Pontiac High School in 1929. He was coached in football at Pontiac by Charles Weldon, who had been the high school football coach to Red Grange. In 1927, Weldon proclaimed the 16-year-old Oliver to be the "second Red Grange."

He enrolled at the Culver Military Academy in Culver, Indiana, where he played football, basketball, and baseball, competed in varsity shell crew, and was the academy's heavyweight boxing champion. He was voted by his fellow cadets as the "Best All-Around Athlete."

== University of Michigan ==
Oliver next enrolled at the University of Michigan. He was a fullback on Michigan's undefeated national championship teams of 1932 and 1933. He also played at quarterback in 1934. As a sophomore in 1932, he began the season as the Wolverines' starting fullback, but he sustained a fractured rib in late October 1932. The injury did not appear serious at first, but the rib snapped while Oliver was punting during practice on October 26, 1932. He was a teammate of Gerald Ford on Michigan's football teams from 1932 to 1934. While at Michigan, he was also the captain of the baseball team and was the fourth student at Michigan to win nine varsity letters in three major sports. (Bennie Oosterbaan and Harry Kipke also won nine letters in football, baseball, and basketball.) Oliver was also the freshman golf champion at Michigan.

== Culver Military Academy ==
After graduating from Michigan in 1935, he returned to the Culver Military Academy where he worked for nearly 40 years. He was the head coach of the school's teams in football (1935–1941, 1946–1968), baseball (1935–1941, 1946–1961), and basketball (1935–1941, 1946–1961). He was a major in the United States Army during World War II, serving with the Second Engineer Amphibious Brigade in the Pacific Theater of Operations from July 1942 to 1946. After retiring as a head coach in 1968, he continued to serve as the academy's director of alumni affairs. Oliver compiled a career record of 152–90–13 as the head football coach at Culver Military Academy. His record as the academy's coach in other sports was 211–137 in basketball and 105–76 in baseball. In 1994, he was posthumously inducted into the Culver Military Academy Athletic Hall of Fame as part of its inaugural class. The academy's football field is named Oliver Field in tribute to Oliver.

== Death and legacy ==
He died of cancer at South Bend Memorial Hospital in December 1974. He was posthumously inducted into the Indiana Football Hall of Fame in August 1985.

== Personal life ==
Oliver married Myra E. (Powrie) Oliver in 1937. She died in December 2009. They had two sons, Bruce I. Oliver and Russell D. Oliver, II
