= 1933 Michigan Wolverines football team =

American college football season

1933 Michigan Wolverines football
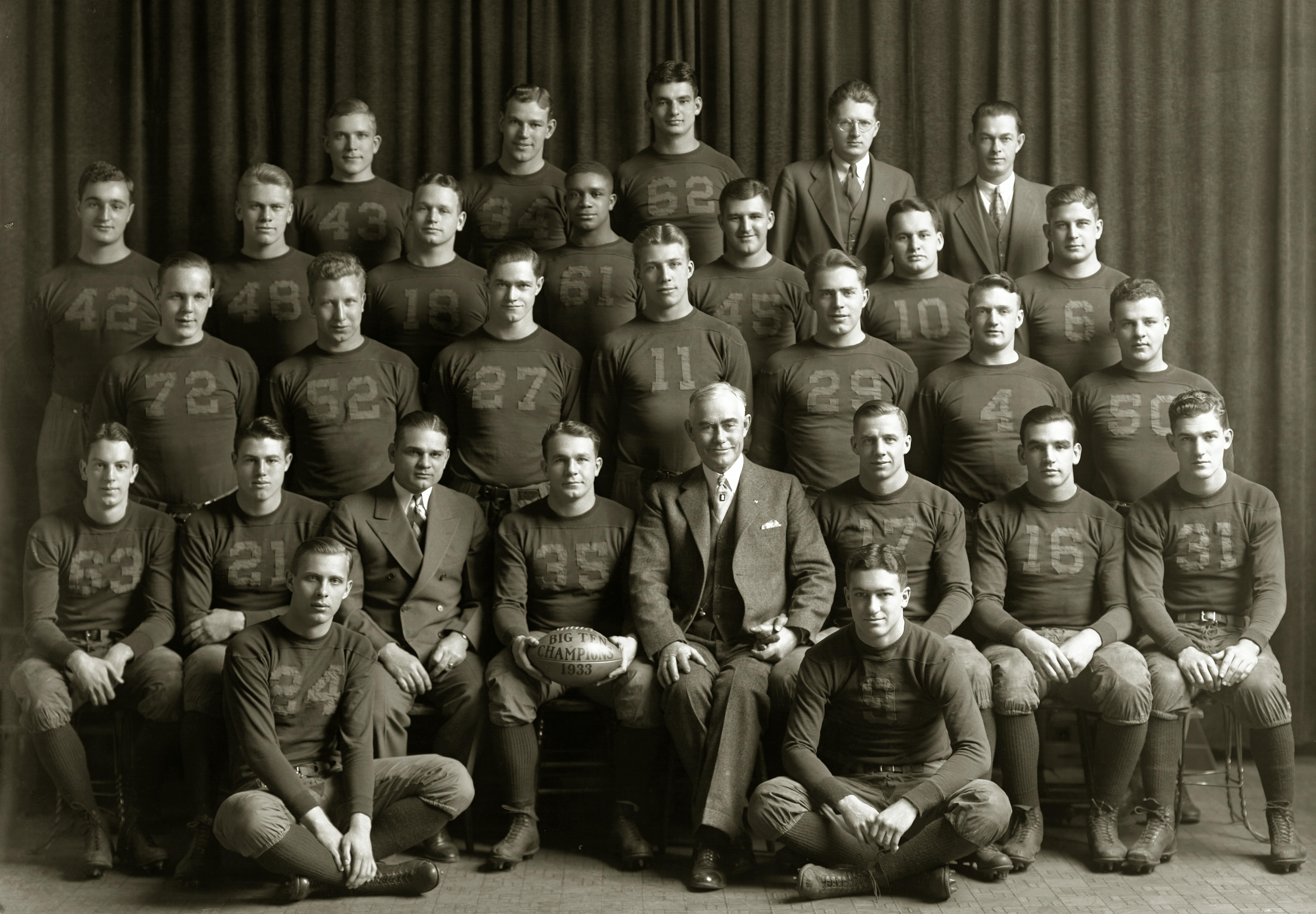

National champion (10 selectors) Co-national champion (Parke H. Davis) Big Ten co-champion
- Conference: Big Ten Conference
- Record: 7–0–1 (5–0–1 Big Ten)
- Head coach: Harry Kipke (5th season)
- MVP: Herman Everhardus
- Captain: Stanley Fay
- Home stadium: Michigan Stadium

Uniform
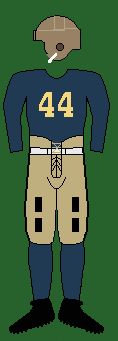

1933 Big Ten Conference football standings
	Conf.					Overall
Team	W		L		T	W		L		T
No. 1 Michigan +	5	–	0	–	1	7	–	0	–	1
No. 3 Minnesota +	2	–	0	–	4	4	–	0	–	4
No. 5 Ohio State	4	–	1	–	0	7	–	1	–	0
No. 10 Purdue	3	–	1	–	1	6	–	1	–	1
Illinois	3	–	2	–	0	5	–	3	–	0
Iowa	3	–	2	–	0	5	–	3	–	0
Northwestern	1	–	4	–	1	1	–	5	–	2
Chicago	0	–	3	–	2	3	–	3	–	2
Indiana	0	–	3	–	2	1	–	5	–	2
Wisconsin	0	–	5	–	1	2	–	5	–	1
+ – Conference co-champions; Rankings from Dickinson System

The 1933 Michigan Wolverines football team represented the University of Michigan in the 1933 Big Ten Conference football season. Under fifth-year head coach Harry Kipke, Michigan compiled an undefeated 7–0–1 record, outscored opponents 131 to 18, extended the team's unbeaten streak to 22 games, and won both the Big Ten Conference and national football championships. The defense shut out five of its eight opponents and gave up an average of only 2.2 points per game. In December 1933, Michigan was awarded the Knute K. Rockne Trophy as the No. 1 team in the country under the Dickinson System. By winning a share of its fourth consecutive Big Ten football championships, the 1933 Wolverines also tied a record set by Fielding H. Yost's "Point-a-Minute" teams from 1901 to 1904.

In the first half of the season, Michigan outscored its opponents, 101 to 6, including a 13–0 shutout of Ohio State. In the second half, Michigan outscored its opponents 30 to 12 and defeated Illinois, 7–6, with the difference being Willis Ward's block of an extra point kick. In the annual Little Brown Jug game, Michigan and Minnesota played to scoreless tie, breaking Michigan's 16-game winning streak (but still preserving the unbeaten streak). Two of Michigan's adversaries also finished among the top five teams in the post-season Dickinson ratings: Minnesota at No. 3 and Ohio State at No. 5.

Left halfback Herman Everhardus was selected as the team's Most Valuable Player. He was also the leading scorer in the Big Ten Conference with 64 points. Center Chuck Bernard and tackle Francis Wistert were consensus first-team picks for the 1933 College Football All-America Team. Left end Ted Petoskey was also selected as a first-team All-American by several selectors. Michigan players also won four of the eleven spots on the All-Big Ten teams selected by the Associated Press and United Press. Michigan's first-team All-Big Ten honorees were Bernard, Everhardus, Petoskey, and Wistert.

== Schedule ==
Date	Opponent	Site	Result	Attendance	Source
October 7	Michigan State*	Michigan Stadium; Ann Arbor, MI (rivalry)	W 20–6	22,090	
October 14	Cornell*	Michigan Stadium; Ann Arbor, MI	W 40–0	27,431	
October 21	Ohio State^{†}	Michigan Stadium; Ann Arbor, MI (rivalry)	W 13–0	93,508	
October 28	at Chicago	Stagg Field; Chicago, IL (rivalry)	W 28–0	19,458	
November 4	at Illinois	Memorial Stadium; Champaign, IL (rivalry)	W 7–6	20,405	
November 11	Iowa	Michigan Stadium; Ann Arbor, MI	W 10–6	22,130	
November 18	Minnesota	Michigan Stadium; Ann Arbor, MI (Little Brown Jug)	T 0–0	52,137	
November 25	at Northwestern	Dyche Stadium; Evanston, IL (rivalry)	W 13–0	23,940–32,000	
*Non-conference game; ^{†}Homecoming

== Pre-season ==
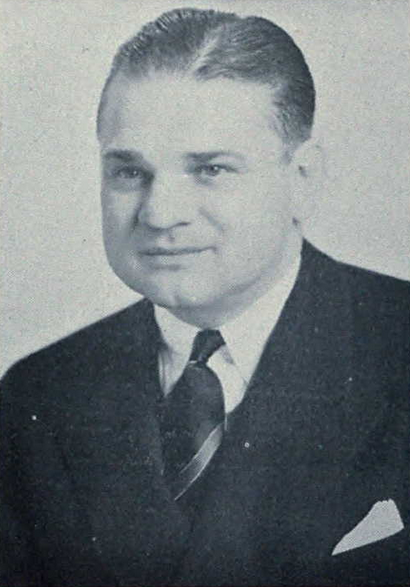
Harry Kipke

Michigan went into its 1933 season with an intact unbeaten streak of 14 games dating back to October 17, 1931. During that span, Michigan had won 13 games and tied one. The 1932 team finished its season with a perfect 8–0 record. The most valuable player on the 1932 team, All-American quarterback Harry Newman, had been lost to graduation. Newman led the 1933 New York Giants to the NFL championship and was selected as the All-Pro quarterback for 1933. Also departed was 1932 team captain Ivy Williamson, who went on to a long career as a coach and athletic director at the University of Wisconsin. However, most of the starters from the unbeaten 1932 team returned for the 1933 season. Key players returning from the 1932 team included halfbacks Herman Everhardus and Stanley Fay, center Chuck Bernard, tackle Whitey Wistert, ends Ted Petoskey and Willis Ward, and fullback John Regeczi.

Bill Renner, who had been a reserve in 1931 but did not play football in 1932, was expected to take over for Newman at quarterback. In early September 1933, Harry Kipke said that Renner was "just as good a passer as Newman – if he can do the other things." Kipke also announced plans to implement a new "rump wheel" formation in which the guards would back away from the line simultaneous with the snap to block for the backs. As Michigan's signal-caller for the 1933 season, Renner was responsible for mastering over 100 plays in the team's playbook – more than triple the 25 to 30 plays used by most teams.

The 1933 pre-season also saw the return of the Little Brown Jug, which had been awarded to the winner of the Michigan-Minnesota game for more than 20 years. The jug had disappeared in 1931. In late August 1933, Al Thomas, the brother of the groundskeeper at Ferry Field, found it in bushes along East University Avenue in Ann Arbor.

Michigan's pre-season training camp began in mid-September. In a letter to a friend, backup center Gerald Ford, who later became President of the United States, wrote about Coach Kipke's pre-season training camp: "You should thank your lucky stars you're not a would be athlete. Between the weather, the coaches and my own wretched condition, the afternoons are long the hours for sleep way too short."

== Season summary ==
=== Week 1: Michigan State ===
Week 1: Michigan State at Michigan

Team	1	2	3	4	Total
Michigan St.	0	0	0	6	6
• Michigan	20	0	0	0	20

- Date: October 7, 1933
- Location: Michigan Stadium
  Ann Arbor, Michigan
- Game attendance: 28,000
- Referee: Horatio B. Hackett

On October 7, 1933, Michigan opened its season against Michigan State College. Michigan won the game, 20–6, on "a misty, soggy field, with occasional misty rain" at Michigan Stadium. Michigan scored all of its points in the first quarter. Early in the game, Whitey Wistert downed the ball at the Spartans' two-yard line after a long punt by John Regeczi. The Spartans punted the ball back to Michigan, and Michigan got the ball at Michigan State's 18-yard line. Herman Everhardus ran for a touchdown, and Ted Petoskey's extra point kick was unsuccessful. Eight minutes into the game, Michigan scored again. A 37-yard punt return by Everhardus gave Michigan the ball at the Spartans' 19-yard line. On second down, Jack Heston ran for the touchdown, and Everhardus kicked the extra point. Later in the quarter, John Kowalik recovered a Michigan State fumble at the Spartans' 23-yard line. Everhardus ran for his second touchdown of the quarter and followed with his second extra point kick. Neither team scored in the second or third quarters. Early in the final period, with Michigan leading 20–0, Michigan State completed an 86-yard drive with a touchdown on a short pass from Muth to Kurt Warmbein. The touchdown was the first scored by Michigan State against Michigan in 15 years.

Charlie Bachman, in his first game as Michigan State's head coach, used a passing game to attempt a comeback. The Spartans completed five of 18 passes for 74 yards. The Wolverines completed one of four passes. After the game, Bachman told reporters: "I am pleased with the outcome of the game, despite the loss, because we got rid of that inferiority complex with Michigan. My two sophomore backs . . . played as if they never heard of Michigan. To them, Michigan was just another football team."

Michigan's starting lineup against Michigan State was Petoskey (left end), Wistert (left tackle), Borgmann (left guard), Bernard (center), Kowalik (right guard), Austin (right tackle), Ward (right end), Fay (quarterback), Everhardus (left halfback), Heston (right halfback), and Regeczi (fullback). Players appearing in the game as substitutes for Michigan were Savage, Beard, Viergever, Westover, Oliver, Renner, Hildebrand, Singer, Jacobson, Tessmer, Chapman, and Fuog.

=== Week 2: Cornell ===
Week 2: Cornell at Michigan

Team	1	2	3	4	Total
Cornell	0	0	0	0	0
• Michigan	7	6	21	6	40

- Date: October 14, 1933
- Location: Michigan Stadium
  Ann Arbor, Michigan
- Game attendance: 45,000
- Referee: James Masker (Northwestern)

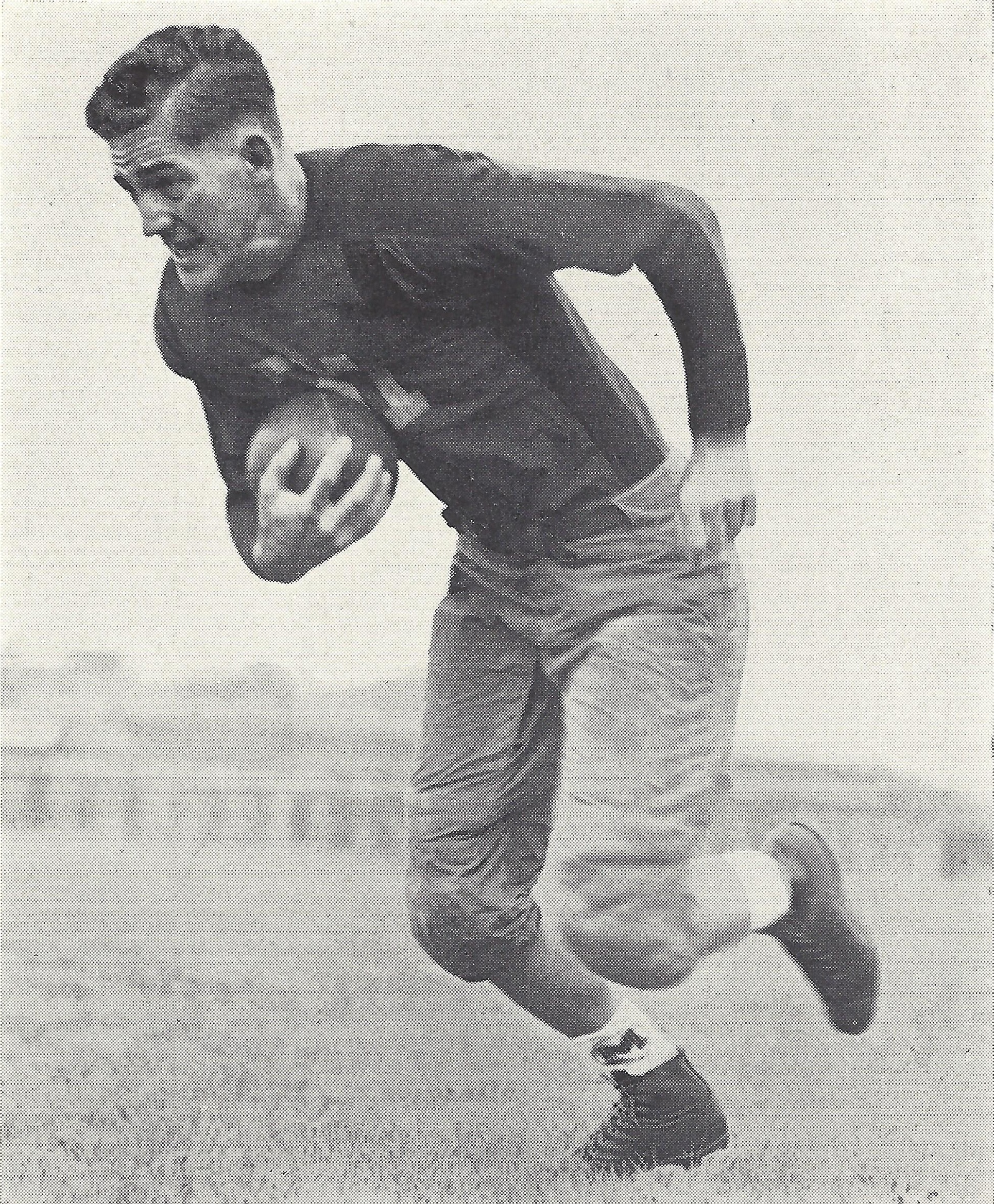
Herman Everhardus scored 21 points against Cornell.

On October 14, 1933, Michigan played Cornell, renewing one of its oldest rivalries. The programs had played 15 games, with Cornell winning the first seven games from 1889 to 1894. The teams had not played since 1917. Cornell's head coach "Gloomy Gil" Dobie led the Big Red to three consecutive undefeated seasons and two national championships in the 1920s. Before the game, Dobie said that his small squad of 27 players "stood absolutely no chance of winning" against Michigan, and Kipke replied that "Michigan hasn't a chance to win from Cornell." The Associated Press referred to the coaches' comments as a battle of the "gloom men."

Michigan extended its unbeaten streak to 16 games by defeating Cornell, 40–0, the Wolverines' largest point total and largest margin of victory in seven years. The Wolverines gained 421 yards of total offense, including 319 rushing yards, 96 passing yards, and six yards on laterals. Left halfback Herman Everhardus led the offense with 21 points on three touchdowns and three extra points. On defense, Michigan held Cornell to 55 yards of total offense. The Wolverines stopped Cornell's highly regarded running game by playing six men at the line of scrimmage throughout the game. Cornell did not complete a pass in the game, and four attempts were intercepted by Michigan.

Michigan scored its first touchdown on a fake punt in the first quarter. Fullback John Regeczi dropped back in punt formation, but instead ran 75 yards around Cornell's right end for the score. Everhardus kicked the extra point. In the second quarter, Everhardus ran 52 yards for Michigan's second touchdown. The extra point attempt failed when Louis Westover fumbled the snap from center. Michigan drove to Cornell's three-yard line shortly before halftime, but the drive ended on a fumble by left end Ted Petoskey.

On the kick-off to start the second half, Everhardus returned the ball 85 yards for a touchdown and kicked the extra point. A short time later, Cornell's left halfback Ferraro fumbled at the Cornell 19-yard line, and Michigan recovered. Everhardus scored from the three-yard line on a lateral pass from Stanley Fay. Everhardus again kicked the extra point. Michigan played its reserves through the balance of the game. A total of 31 players appeared in the game for Michigan. Late in the third quarter, Fay scored a touchdown on a lateral pass from Bill Renner, and Carl Savage kicked the extra point. In the fourth quarter, Michael Malashevich scored the final touchdown on a 52-yard pass play from Renner. Harvey Chapman's attempt at the extra point was unsuccessful. Michigan's backup quarterback Estel Tessmer broke his collar bone in the fourth quarter and was unable to play for the remainder of the season.

Michigan's starting lineup against Cornell was Petoskey (left end), Wistert (left tackle), Savage (left guard), Bernard (center), Borgmann (right guard), Austin (right tackle), Ward (right end), Fay (quarterback), Everhardus (left halfback), Heston (right halfback), and Regeczi (fullback). Michigan substitutes appearing in the game were Chapman, Malashevich, Johnson, Hildebrant, Viergever, McGuire, Jacobson, Kowalik, Beard, Singer, Wells, Ponto, Ford, Fuog, Tessmer, Westover, Renner, Triplehorn, Dauksza, Oliver, and Remias.

=== Week 3: Ohio State ===
Week 3: Ohio State at Michigan

Team	1	2	3	4	Total
Ohio State	0	0	0	0	0
• Michigan	0	6	0	7	13

- Date: October 21, 1933
- Location: Michigan Stadium
  Ann Arbor, Michigan
- Game attendance: 93,508
- Referee: Fred Gardner (Cornell)

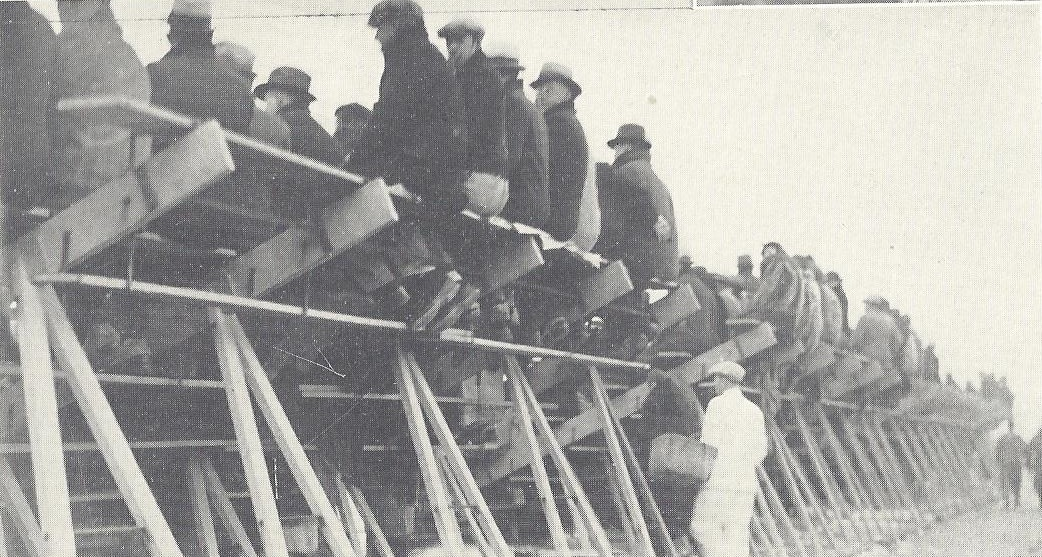
Temporary seating erected around the edges of Michigan Stadium for the Ohio State game.

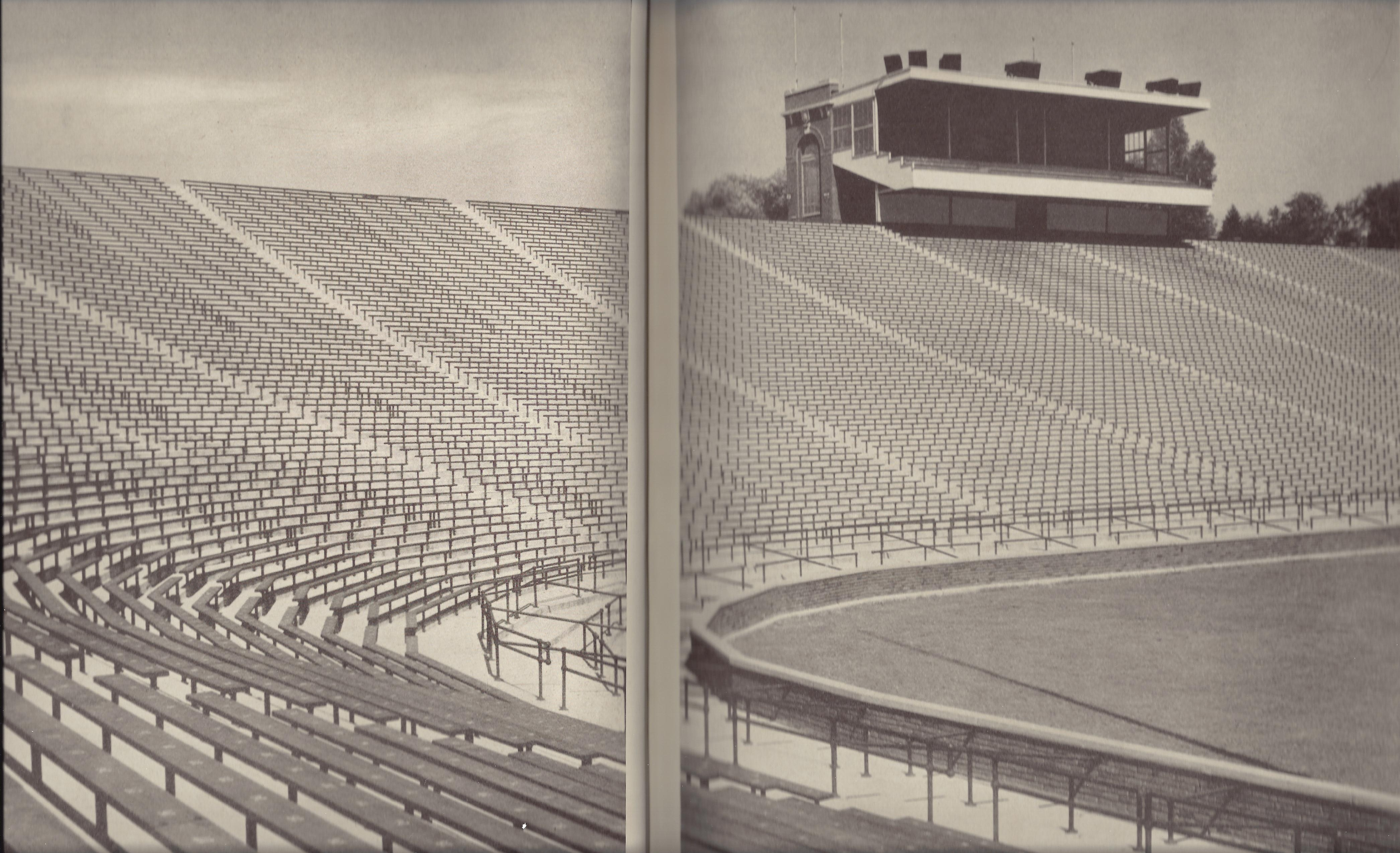
Michigan Stadium, c. 1933

On October 21, 1933, Michigan played Ohio State in Ann Arbor. Michigan's last defeat before the 1933 season had been against Ohio State in 1931, and the 1933 Ohio State team was reputed to be "the most powerful Ohio team since the days of Gaylord Stinchcomb and Chic Harley." With both teams contending for the Big Ten Conference championship, it was the most anticipated meeting in the Michigan–Ohio State football rivalry since 1922. An Associated Press report noted: "Feverish excitement, unequaled since that week 11 years ago when Michigan was getting ready to dedicate Ohio State's new stadium, has taken hold of Maize and Blue followers." Another report noted: "The 'rah-rah' spirit is rampant once more in Ann Arbor to the extent that gang fights between Freshmen and Sophomores are being revived after a lapse of several years."

In a departure from his practice of allowing the press to attend Michigan's workouts, Michigan coach Harry Kipke prepared for the game behind locked gates at Ferry Field. The Associated Press reported that "an air of deepest mystery" surrounded the Michigan camp, with expectations that Kipke intended to "shoot the works" against Ohio State. Michigan athletic director Fielding H. Yost predicted the matchup would be "some game" and added, "It won't be a parade of chocolate soldiers." A pep rally was set for Hill Auditorium the night before the game. The Michigan team spent the night at Barton Hills Country Club while the Ohio State team stayed overnight in Dearborn, Michigan. Though Michigan Stadium's official capacity was 75,000, the demand for tickets prompted Michigan's athletic department to build temporary seating around the edge of the bowl. Newspapers and the University of Michigan yearbook reported that the game ultimately drew a crowd of more than 93,000, including 11,000 Ohio State fans. Up to that time, it was "the largest crowd that ever saw a Maize and Blue team perform."

Michigan defeated the Buckeyes in the game, 13–0. The Wolverines gained 231 yards of total offense, 192 on the ground and 39 in the air. They held the Buckeyes to 60 rushing yards, 46 passing yards, and three first downs. Ohio State completed two of ten passes, with five passes being intercepted by Michigan. Ted Petoskey was reported to be the outstanding player on defense: "Petoskey halted Ohio's rushes at his end, eluded his blockers, pulled down runners at the line of scrimmage and tossed them for losses, coming from behind to make smothering tackles." Bill Renner scored Michigan's first touchdown on a long drive in the second quarter that featured a 19-yard gain on a pass from Renner to John Regeczi and a run by Jack Heston (Willie Heston's son) on Fielding H. Yost's "old 83" play. Renner ran for the touchdown from the three-yard line. The extra point kick by Herman Everhardus was wide, and Michigan led, 6–0.

In the third quarter, Willis Ward returned an interception 50 yards. The Associated Press wrote:

"Willis Ward, the one-man track team, gave his best exhibition of end play. His 50-yard dash with an intercepted forward pass was the longest and by far the fastest run of the game. Ward sprinted past the last Buckeye, who barely touched his foot and tripped him on the Ohio 25-yard line."

Michigan was unable to capitalize on Ward's long return, as a field goal attempt by Everhardus went wide. In the fourth quarter, Michigan's second touchdown was set up by Chuck Bernard. Bernard intercepted a pass at midfield and returned it to the 23-yard line. Michigan drove to the two-yard line, and Everhardus scored on a two-yard off-tackle run. Carl Savage kicked the extra point to extend the lead to 13–0. In The News-Bee of Toledo, Frank Buckley described Michigan as the "Big Bad Wolf" of the Western Conference and wrote: "Michigan humbled, outclassed, outfought and completely outplayed Ohio State."

Steve Farrell, who had served for many years as Michigan's track coach and the trainer of the football team, died four days before the Ohio State game. In a tribute to Farrell, the Michigan band formed the word "Steve" and "marched slowly down the field as taps were sounded."

Michigan's starting lineup against Ohio State was Petoskey (left end), Wistert (left tackle), Savage (left guard), Bernard (center), Kowalik (right guard), Austin (right tackle), Ward (right end), Fay (quarterback), Everhardus (left halfback), Heston (right halfback), and Regeczi (fullback). Michigan substitutes appearing in the game were Renner, Westover, Oliver, Chapman, Viergever, Hildebrand, Borgmann, Beard, and Ford.

=== Week 4: at Chicago ===
Week 4: Michigan at Chicago

Team	1	2	3	4	Total
• Michigan	14	0	0	14	28
Chicago	0	0	0	0	0

- Date: October 28, 1933
- Location: Stagg Field
  Chicago
- Game attendance: 19,458
- Referee: Frank Birch

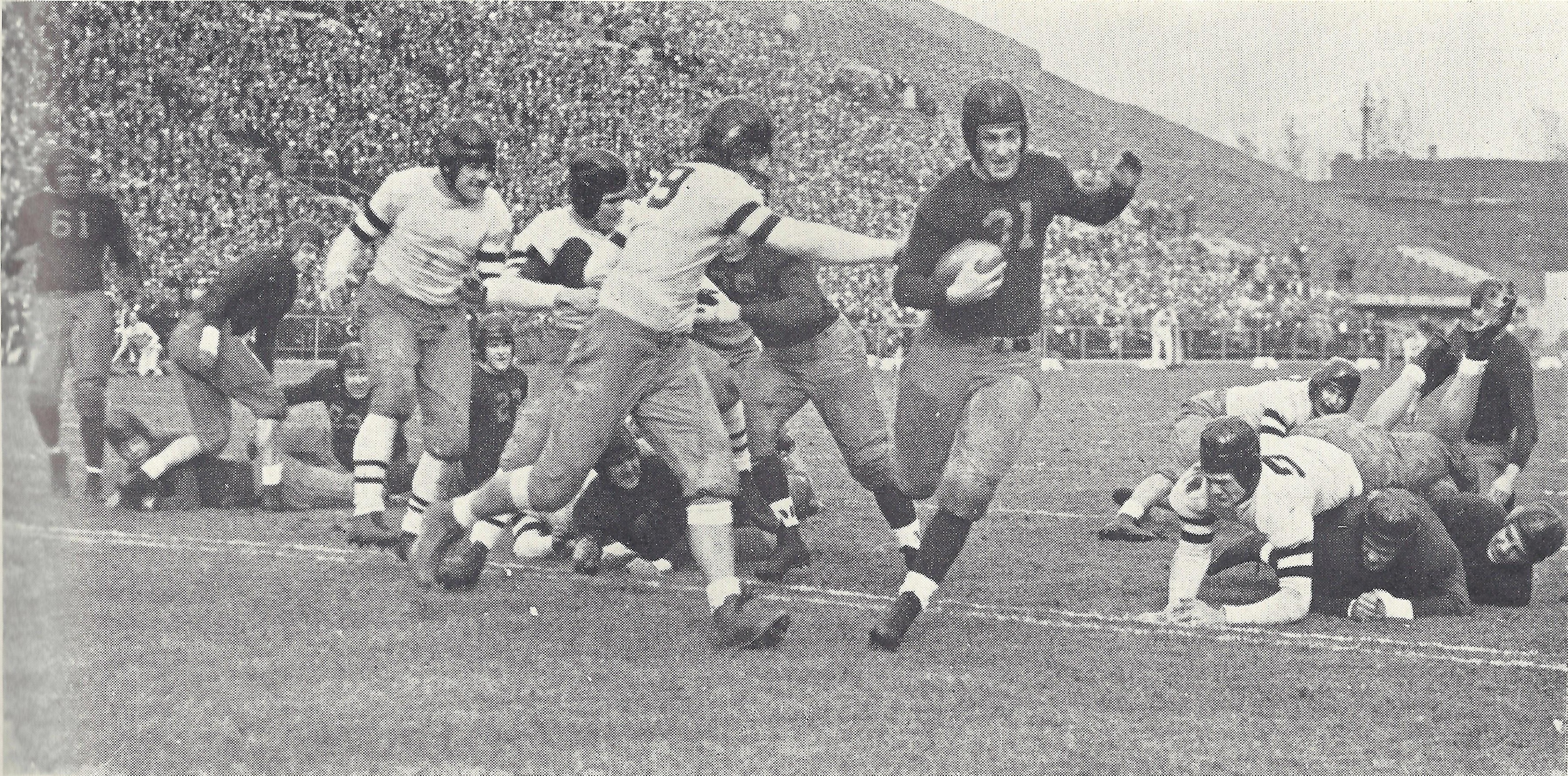
Herman Everhardus runs for a touchdown against Chicago.

Michigan played its first road game on October 28, 1933, against the Chicago Maroons. The game attracted many Michigan fans, drawn by the lure of the game as well as the 1933 World's Fair (called the Century of Progress) being held in Chicago. Even Michigan's backup center, Gerald Ford, expressed a desire to attend the fair while in Chicago. Days before the Chicago trip, the future U.S. President wrote to a friend:

"Leave for Chicago Friday and stay there until Sunday afternoon. Maybe I'll get a chance to see the 'fair,' but already some of the boys are planning a celebration party and I'm sure I'll have to partake so 'Sally Rand' [a famous fan dancer performing at the fair] will have to wait."

After returning from Chicago, Ford wrote to the same friend: "Had a swell time in Chicago and didn't see Sally Rand either. Saw all of the fair in 25 minutes, at least all I wanted to see."

Chicago's 1933 football team was led by a new head coach, Clark Shaughnessy, and by Jay Berwanger, who won the first Heisman Trophy two years later. Although the 1933 Maroons were reputed to be "the best Chicago team in years", Michigan won, 28–0, the largest margin of victory recorded by Michigan against a Chicago team. Stanley Fay and Herman Everhardus scored touchdowns in the first quarter, and Bill Renner and Louis Westover scored in the fourth quarter. Fay scored the first touchdown on the seventh play of the game. Westover's touchdown came on a 33-yard pass from Renner in the fourth quarter. Extra points were kicked by Everhardus (2), Ted Petoskey, and Harvey Chapman. On defense, Michigan allowed Chicago to cross the 50-yard line only twice, and one of those instances resulted from a Michigan fumble at its own 39-yard line. In the fourth quarter, Chicago halfback Zimmer ran the ball 32 yards to Michigan's 48-yard line, but the drive stalled there. Through the first four games of the season, Michigan had outscored its opponents, 101 to 6.

Michigan's starting lineup against Chicago was Petoskey (left end), Wistert (left tackle), Savage (left guard), Bernard (center), Kowalik (right guard), Austin (right tackle), Ward (right end), Westover (quarterback), Everhardus (left halfback), Fay (right halfback), and Regeczi (fullback). Players appearing in the game as substitutes for Michigan were Chapman, Malashevich, Viergever, Hildebrand, Stone, Jacobson, McGuire, Borgmann, Ponto, Beard, Singer, Ford, Fuog, Renner, Bolas, Triplehorn, Oliver, and Remias.

=== Week 5: at Illinois ===
Week 5: Michigan at Illinois

Team	1	2	3	4	Total
• Michigan	0	7	0	0	7
Illinois	6	0	0	0	6

- Date: November 4, 1933
- Location: Memorial Stadium
  Champaign, Illinois
- Game attendance: 27,000
- Referee: J. Masker (Northwestern)

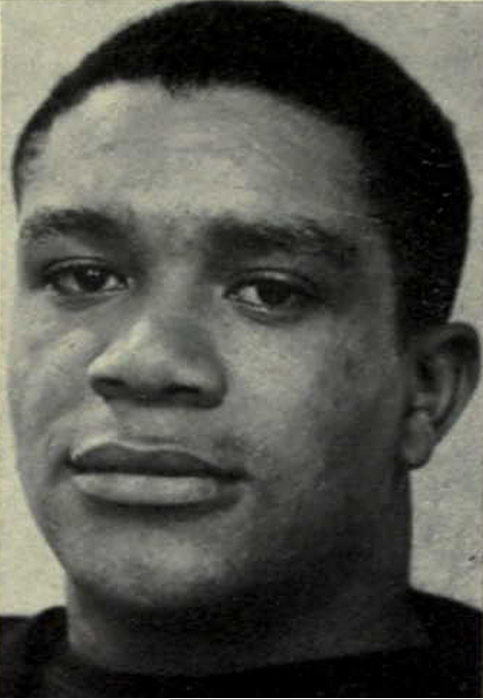
Willis Ward's block of Illinois' extra point preserved Michigan's winning streak.

Michigan played its second consecutive road game on November 4, 1933, against Illinois. Before the game, a member of the Michigan coaching staff expressed concern that Illinois head coach Robert Zuppke, with two weeks to prepare due to a bye week, would have a variety of tricks ready for Michigan.

Michigan won by the margin of a missed extra point kick, 7–6. Illinois scored first on a drive fueled by the passing of Illinois quarterback Jack Beynon. Fullback Cook scored from the three-yard line, but Barton Cummings' kick for the extra point was blocked by Michigan's right end Willis Ward. In the second quarter, a poor punt by Beynon gave Michigan possession at the Illinois 28-yard line. After moving the ball to the 15-yard line, Bill Renner passed to Ted Petoskey at the seven-yard line. The ball was moved to the one-yard line after a penalty against Illinois, and Herman Everhardus ran around right end for a touchdown. Everhardus kicked the extra point to give the Wolverines a 7–6 lead. Neither team scored in the third quarter. With 15 seconds remaining in the game, John Regeczi punted from Michigan's end zone. Illinois quarterback Beynon made a fair catch at Michigan's 31-yard line. Illinois elected to attempt a field goal without interference, an option available to team receiving a punt under 1933 rules. The crowd stood as Barton Cummings lined up to attempt the kick. The kick was a foot wide of the upright, and Michigan's 7–6 lead held.

After Michigan's domination of its first four opponents, the Wolverines had been "hailed afar as the 'perfect team.'" The performance of Illinois reportedly "rekindled hope in the hearts of Michigan's rivals." Illinois coach Zuppke was credited for his "magnificent" strategy in nearly upsetting the Wolverines. Michigan left guard, Carl Savage, suffered a ligament injury in the game, and his leg was placed in a cast. Savage's injury proved to involve a fractured bone in his foot, and he was unable to return to the Michigan lineup.

Michigan's starting lineup against Illinois was Petoskey (left end), Wistert (left tackle), Savage (left guard), Bernard (center), Kowalik (right guard), Austin (right tackle), Ward (right end), Fay (quarterback), Everhardus (left halfback), Heston (right halfback), and Regeczi (fullback).

=== Week 6: Iowa ===
Week 6: Iowa at Michigan

Team	1	2	3	4	Total
Iowa	0	0	6	0	6
• Michigan	3	7	0	0	10

- Date: November 11, 1933
- Location: Michigan Stadium
  Ann Arbor, Michigan
- Game attendance: 26,000
- Referee: D. B. Lourie (Princeton)

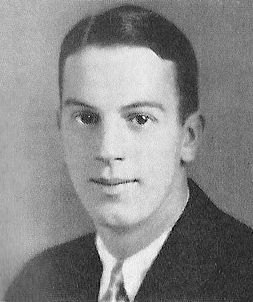
Bill Renner "displayed uncanny passing aim" against Iowa.

On November 11, 1933, Michigan played Ossie Solem's Iowa Hawkeyes. Michigan won the game, 10–6. The game was played on a wet field with occasional snow flurries before a crowd of 26,000 at Michigan Stadium. Michigan's first points came on a field goal by Herman Everhardus from the 24-yard line. In the second quarter, Everhardus ran 47 yards to the Iowa 16-yard line. On fourth down, Bill Renner threw a touchdown pass to Stanley Fay. Everhardus kicked the extra point to give Michigan a 10–0 lead. In the third quarter, Iowa scored on a drive that featured a long pass from George Teyro to Dick Crayne and a touchdown pass from Teyro to Bernard Page. Ted Petoskey and Willis Ward blocked Russ Fisher's kick for the extra point. Michigan gained 216 yards on rushing and 27 yards on passes. The Associated Press opened its account of the game: "Herman Everhardus, the Flying Dutchman of Kalamazoo, unleashed a toe as true as a navy siege gun and Bill Renner displayed uncanny passing aim today as Michigan's powerful football team, playing in snow and ice, swept toward a fourth consecutive Big Ten championship . . ."

Iowa was held to 39 yards rushing, but gained 113 yards on passes. After giving up 113 passing yards, some in the media questioned the strength of Michigan's pass defense. Michigan athletic director Fielding H. Yost dismissed the criticism. Yost showed his to reporters and explained that Iowa had completed five of 19 passes for 120 yards. He pointed out that nine passes were incomplete, and five others were intercepted, two by Ward and one each by Everhardus, Louis Westover and Tom Austin. Yost pointed out that Michigan had returned the five interceptions for 169 yards, giving Michigan a net gain of 49 yards on Iowa's 19 passes.

Michigan's starting lineup against Iowa was Petoskey (left end), Wistert (left tackle), Hildebrand (left guard), Bernard (center), Kowalik (right guard), Austin (right tackle), Ward (right end), Fay (quarterback), Everhardus (left halfback), Heston (right halfback), and Regeczi (fullback). Players appearing in the game as substitutes for Michigan were Jacobson, Singer, Borgmann, Renner, Westover, Oliver and Ford.

=== Week 7: Minnesota ===
Week 7: Minnesota at Michigan

Team	1	2	3	4	Total
Minnesota	0	0	0	0	0
Michigan	0	0	0	0	0

- Date: November 18, 1933
- Location: Michigan Stadium
  Ann Arbor, Michigan
- Game attendance: 65,000
- Referee: Frank Birch

On November 18, 1933, Michigan played Bernie Bierman's Minnesota Golden Gophers. Like the Illini two weeks earlier, Minnesota had two weeks to prepare for the Wolverines following a bye week. The game ended in a scoreless tie. Each team attempted three passes, and neither team completed any. Two of Michigan's three pass attempts were intercepted by Minnesota. Bierman's Golden Gophers also held Michigan to 58 rushing yards. Michigan's best scoring opportunity was set up by a Statue of Liberty play in which Bill Renner dropped back to pass and cocked his arm to throw. Stanley Fay ran behind Renner and took the ball from Renner's extended hand. Fay ran around the end and eluded one tackler before being tackled by Vernal Levoir and Pug Lund at the Gophers' 30-yard line. Michigan was unable to penetrate further. Minnesota gained 132 yards on the ground, mostly by left halfback Pug Lund. In the third quarter, Lund ran for a 42-yard gain, and in the fourth quarter, he ran from kick formation, taking the ball to Michigan's 38-yard line. Two plays later, Minnesota fullback Vernal Levoir took the ball to Michigan's 16-yard line. When Michigan held Minnesota on three plays, Bill Bevan attempted a field goal from the 25-yard line. The kick went wide, and Minnesota's best scoring chance was lost.

After the game, Coach Kipke told reporters: "We got off easy. . . . Minnesota has a great football team, and it is only fair to say we were lucky to hold them scoreless. . . . Our offense probably would have looked better on a dry field. Everhadus is our only hard driving back, while Minnesota has three, . . . Our other ball carriers depend on sidestepping to go places and they couldn't do much of that with the footing so slippery." Kipke also praised his defense for their play after Minnesota drove to the 15-yard line: "Fourth down and 12 yards to go didn't look bad at all. Renner certainly meant business when he threw Alfonse for that six-yard loss." The Wolverines played a defensive oriented game and relied heavily on Regeczi's punting. One sports columnist wrote: "No game I have seen this season more clearly brought out the inestimable value of consistent punting as did this bruise and batter struggle . . . No matter where Michigan was located when Johnny Regeczi went back to kick, the boot almost always was good enough to place Minnesota on the defensive."

The tie snapped a 16-game winning streak for Harry Kipke's Wolverines dating back to November 14, 1931. Bierman's Golden Gophers went on to undefeated national championship seasons in 1934 and 1935.

Michigan's starting lineup against Minnesota was Petoskey (left end), Wistert (left tackle), Hildebrand (left guard), Bernard (center), Kowalik (right guard), Austin (right tackle), Ward (right end), Fay (quarterback), Everhardus (left halfback), Renner (right halfback), and Regeczi (fullback). Players appearing in the game as substitutes for Michigan were Borgmann and Heston.

=== Week 8: at Northwestern ===
Week 8: Michigan at Northwestern

Team	1	2	3	4	Total
• Michigan	0	3	10	0	13
Northwestern	0	0	0	0	0

- Date: November 25, 1933
- Location: Dyche Stadium
  Evanston, Illinois
- Game attendance: 32,000
- Referee: Fred Gardner (Cornell)

Michigan concluded its undefeated season with a 10–0 victory over the Northwestern Wildcats at Dyche Stadium in Evanston. Through most of the first half, the game was scoreless. With less than 30 seconds remaining in the half, Herman Everhardus kicked a field goal from the 25-yard line to give Michigan a 3–0 lead. Early in the third quarter, Bill Renner threw a 37-yard pass that hit Willis Ward over his right shoulder at full speed. Ward crossed the goal line, and Everhardus kicked the extra point. Ted Petoskey added a field goal from the 35-yard line near the end of the third quarter. Michigan gained only 122 yards of total offense in the game, 37 on the ground and 85 in the air. The Wildcats were held to 110 yards of total offense, 83 on the ground and 27 in the air. Two interceptions helped to prevent Northwestern from scoring.

The game was played with strong winds impairing the kicking game. Wisconsin coach Clarence Spears wrote that Regeczi, with his strong kicking against Northwestern, was "50 percent of the team." Spears wrote: "Regeczi's kicking kept Michigan continually in front of the goal posts, where it could throw a long pass or try for a field goal."

Michigan's starting lineup against Northwestern was Petoskey (left end), Wistert (left tackle), Hildebrand (left guard), Bernard (center), Kowalik (right guard), Austin (right tackle), Ward (right end), Fay (quarterback), Everhardus (left halfback), Heston (right halfback), and Regeczi (fullback).

== Post-season ==
=== Team championships ===
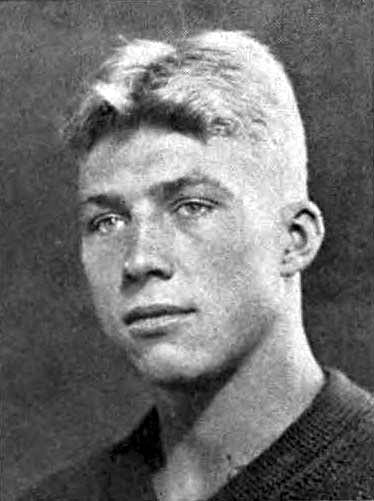
Consensus All-American Whitey Wistert

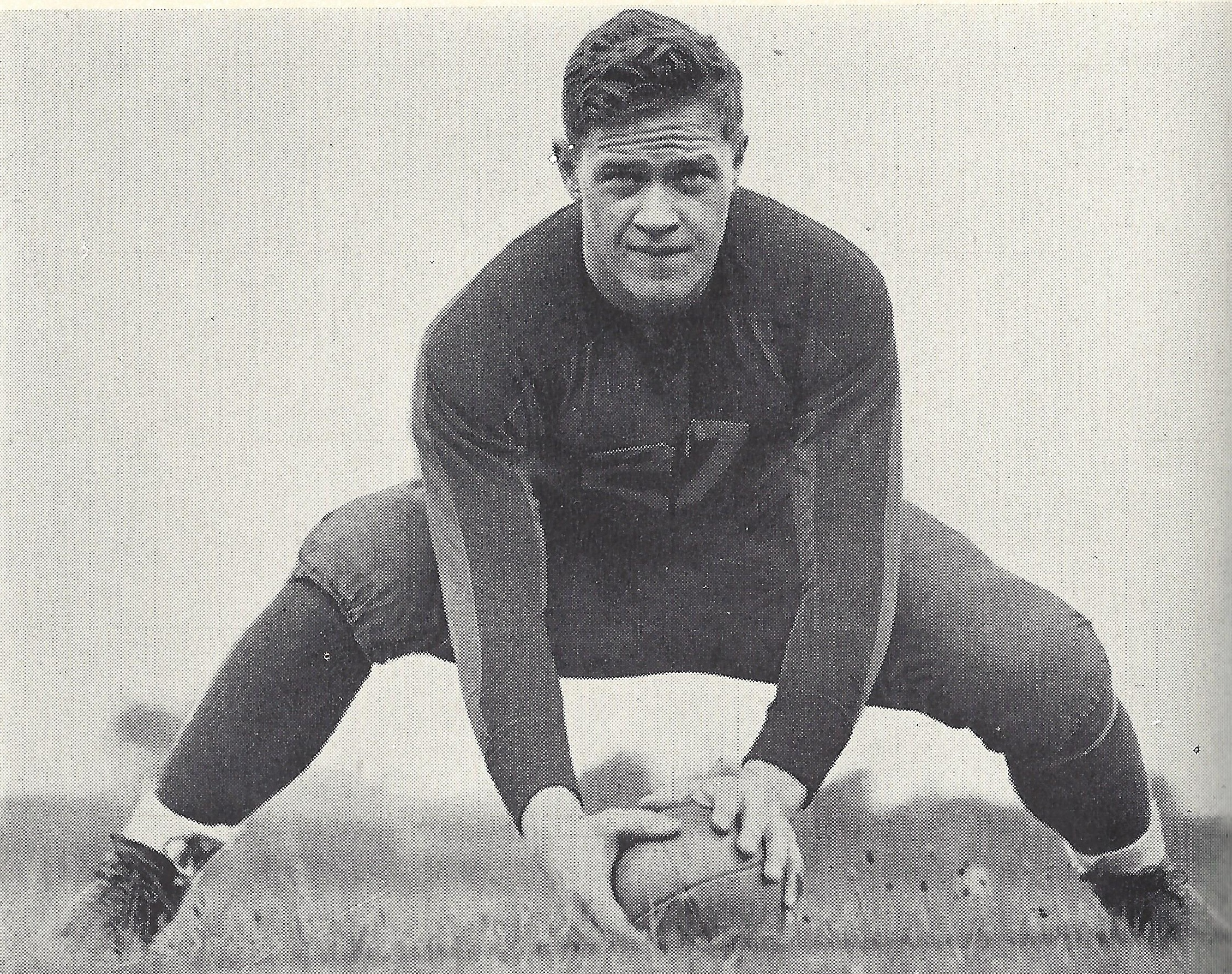
Consensus All-American Chuck Bernard

For the second year in a row, Michigan received the Knute K. Rockne Trophy as the top-ranked team in the country under the Dickinson System, a rating model developed by Frank G. Dickinson, an economics professor at the University of Illinois. Having played what was considered an "extremely difficult schedule", Michigan was awarded 28.52 points, well ahead of the runners up: Nebraska (24.61), Minnesota (23.87), Pittsburgh (23.01), and Ohio State (23.01). In addition to winning the Rockne Trophy, the 1933 Michigan team has been recognized as national champions by the Billingsley Report, the National Championship Foundation, the College Football Researchers Association, the Boand System, the Helms Athletic Foundation, the Houlgate System, Parke H. Davis, the Poling System and the Sagarin Ratings.

The 1933 season was also the fourth straight year in which Michigan had won at least a share of the Big Ten Conference football championship. The last school to accomplish that feat was Michigan from 1901 to 1904 – Fielding H. Yost's "Point-a-Minute" teams.

In mid-December 1933, rumors circulated that Kipke had been offered the job as the new head football coach at Yale. Kipke denied having been officially offered the job, but said he would consider it if offered. Three days later, Kipke announced that he would remain at Michigan and had been given "a slight increase in salary" and would be seeking salary increases for his assistant coaches as well. With his status settled, Kipke traveled to California where he helped Columbia prepare for its game against Stanford in the 1934 Rose Bowl.

=== Individual honors ===
Several Michigan players received significant honors for their role in leading the 1933 team to a national championship. Left halfback Herman Everhardus was the Big Ten scoring leader in 1933 with 64 points on eight touchdowns, 10 extra points, and two field goals. He was also named the Most Valuable Player on Michigan's 1933 team. At the end of the season, Coach Kipke said, "Everhardus stepped out and became a really great ballplayer this fall."

Center Chuck Bernard and tackle Francis Wistert were consensus first-team picks for the 1933 College Football All-America Team. End Ted Petoskey was selected as a first-team All-American by the International News Service (the Hearst newspapers' wire service), the Central Press Association, and Midweek Pictorial, and received second-team honors from the Associated Press, United Press, and Collier's Weekly (by Grantland Rice). Everhardus received second-team All-American honors from the International News Service and the Newspaper Enterprise Association (selected by NEA's All-America Committee of coaches), and third-team honors from Collier's Weekly. Bernard, Wistert, Petoskey, and Everhardus were also first-team members of the All-Big Ten Conference teams selected by the United Press and Associated Press.

Based on his contributions to both the track and football teams, right end Willis Ward finished second in balloting for the Associated Press Big Ten Athlete of the Year award. The voting was by Big Ten coaches with 55 votes being cast. Duane Purvis of Purdue won the award with 17 votes; Ward received 15 votes. (Ted Petoskey, Wards's counterpart at the left end of the Michigan line, finished in third place with five votes.) Ward was the first African-American to play football at Michigan in more than 40 years. At the Butler Relays in April 1933, he ran the 60-yard dash in 6.2 seconds, tying the world record. He was the starting right end in every game for the 1933 football team. In late November, Coach Kipke noted "Ward and Petoskey were near perfection" in their play at the end positions. Time magazine wrote: "Michigan came perilously close to slipping from the top of the Big Ten, where it has been for three years. That it did not slip was largely due to a crack halfback named Herman Everhardus and to Willis Ward, a rangy Negro end. It was Ward who, after hard-fighting Illinois had marched to a touchdown in the first period, shot through and blocked the place kick which would have given Illinois a seventh point."

In early December 1933, the team elected Tom Austin as the captain of the 1934 team. Austin was raised in Columbus, Ohio. He was the fifth Ohio native and the first lineman to be selected as Michigan's team captain in nine years.

=== Legalized beer ===
In a letter dated September 17, 1933, Gerald Ford wrote: "Herm Everhardus and myself just had a couple bottles of beer a piece, and did they ever taste good after drinking milk (and that's all) at the training table. After abstaining for a couple of days, it was really very refreshing." Only months earlier, the consumption of beer would have been illegal. An amendment to the Volstead Act allowing the sale of beer went into effect in April 1933. The availability of beer had a noticeable impact in Ann Arbor on football Saturdays. On October 8, 1933, the day after the Michigan-Michigan State football game, Ford noted that his fraternity was planning a big party with a barrel of beer. He added, "You should have seen the campus this week-end, more drunks than ever and they all claim that the year is just beginning. I'm afraid to imagine what it will be by the Ohio State game." Ford's concern proved prescient. After the Ohio State game, the university attracted unwanted national publicity when its board in control of athletics mailed notices to ticket holders warning that they would be ejected if complaints were received about their drinking. The notices stated that the board was not concerned with "the personal habits and tastes" of ticket-holders, but felt a deep concern "when indulgence in such habits and tastes results in conduct disgusting or offensive to other patrons."

== Players ==
=== Varsity letter winners ===
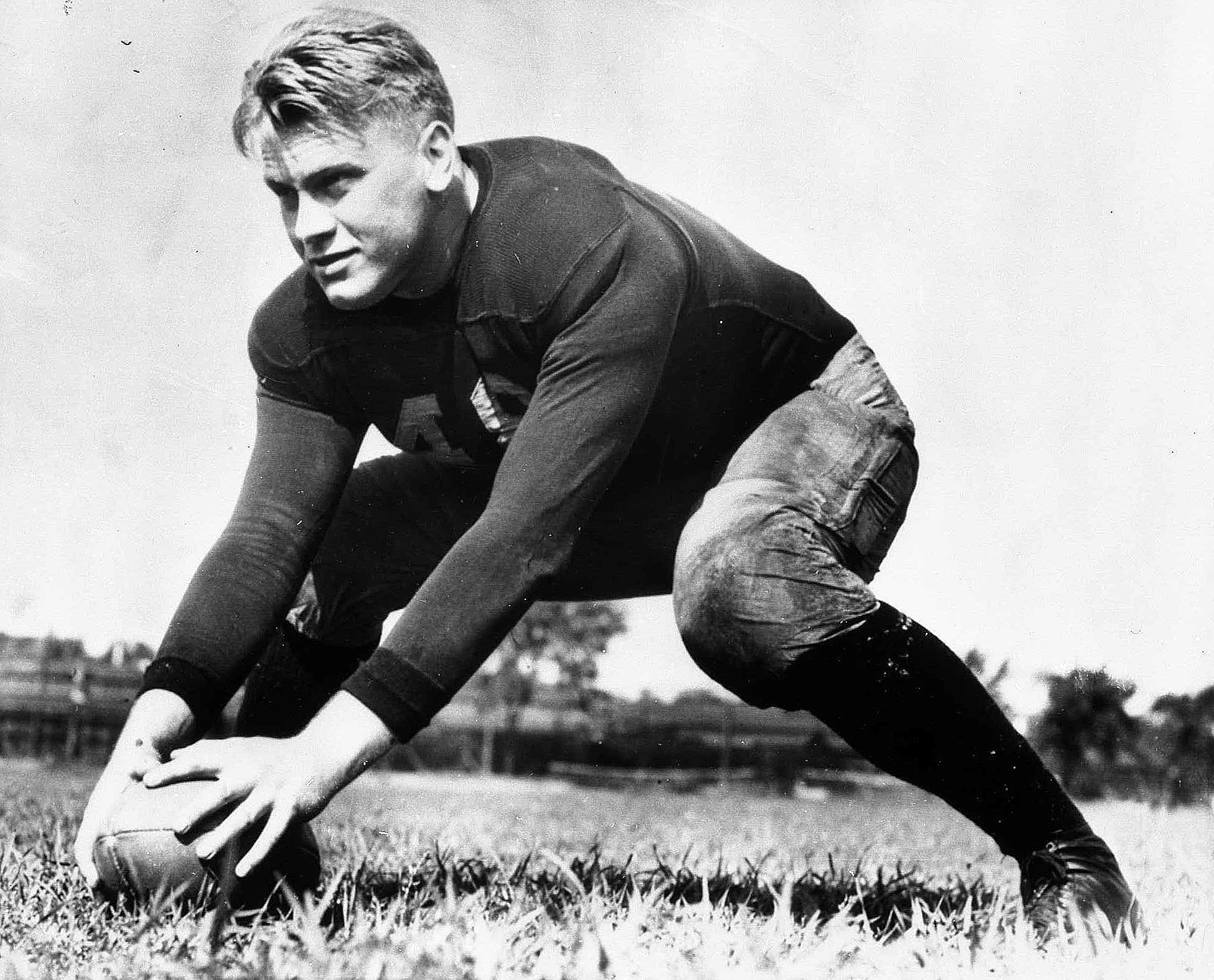
Gerald Ford

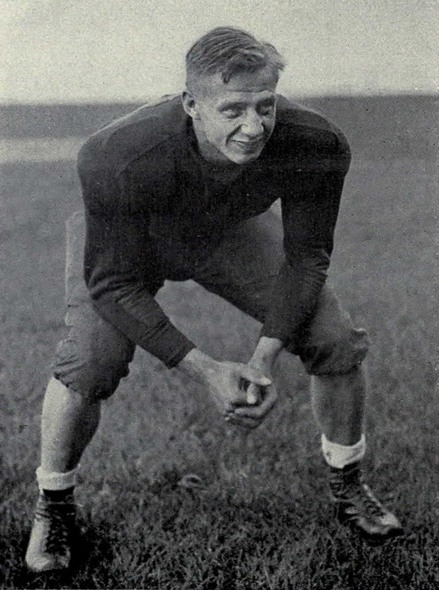
Left end Ted Petoskey

- Thomas D. Austin, Columbus, Ohio – started 8 games at right tackle
- Chester C. Beard, Youngstown, Ohio – guard
- Chuck Bernard, Benton Harbor, Michigan – started 8 games at center
- William Borgmann, Fort Wayne, Indiana – started 1 game at left guard, 1 game at right guard
- Harvey E. Chapman, Detroit – end
- Herman Everhardus, Kalamazoo, Michigan – started 8 games at left halfback
- Stanley Fay, Detroit – started 6 games at quarterback, 2 games at right halfback
- Gerald Ford, Grand Rapids, Michigan – center
- Russell J. Fuog, Chicago – center, guard
- John P. "Jack" Heston, Detroit – started 6 games at right halfback
- Willard Hildebrand, Saginaw, Michigan – started 3 games at left guard
- Tage Jacobson, Detroit – tackle
- John Kowalik – started 7 games at right guard
- Michael Malashevich, Dearborn, Michigan – end
- Russell D. Oliver, Pontiac, Michigan – fullback
- Fred Petoskey, St. Charles, Michigan – started 8 games at left end
- John Regeczi, Muskegon Heights, Michigan – started 8 games at fullback
- Bill Renner, Youngstown, Ohio – started 1 game at quarterback
- Carl Savage, Flint, Michigan – started 4 games at left guard
- Oscar Arthur Singer, Jackson Heights, New York – guard
- Estel Tessmer, Ann Arbor, Michigan – quarterback
- John D. Viergever, Algonac, Michigan – tackle
- Willis Ward, Detroit – started 8 games at right end
- Louis Westover, Bay City, Michigan – started 1 game at quarterback
- Francis Wistert, Chicago – started 8 games at left tackle
Louis Westover

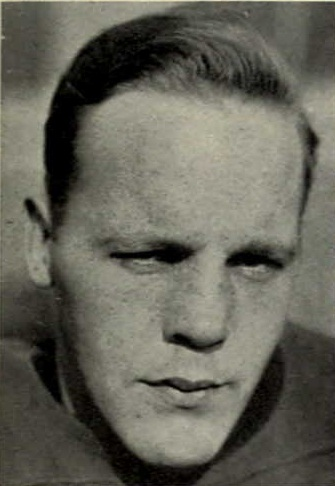
Tage Jacobson

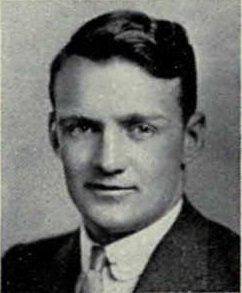
Carl Savage

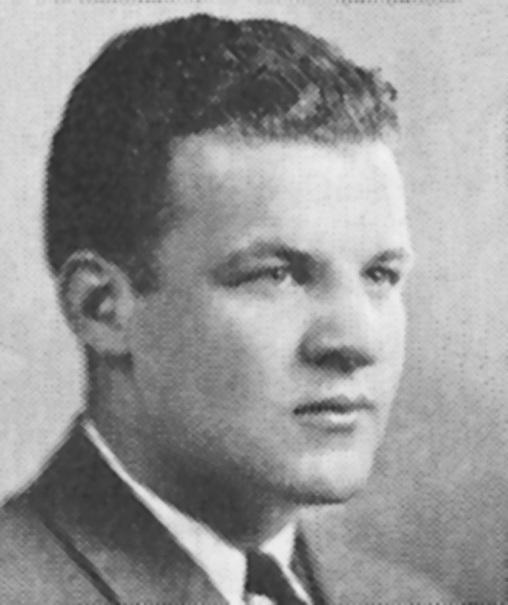
Oscar Singer

Jack Heston

Russell Fuog

=== Varsity reserves ===
- George A. Bolas, Chicago – quarterback
- Tony Dauksza, Grand Rapids, Michigan – quarterback
- Ernest C. Johnson, Grand Rapids, Michigan – end
- James A. Kidston, LaGrange, Illinois – fullback
- Donald T. McGuire, South Haven, Michigan – tackle
- Hilton A. Ponto, Ann Arbor, Michigan – guard
- Steve Remias, Chicago – fullback
- Howard Triplehorn, Bluffton, Ohio – halfback
- Robert L. Wells, Grand Rapids, Michigan – guard

=== Scoring leaders ===
Player	Touchdowns	Extra points	Field goals	Points
Herman Everhardus	8	10	2	64
Stanley Fay	3	0	0	18
Bill Renner	2	0	0	12
Jack Heston	1	0	0	6
M. Malashevich	1	0	0	6
John Regeczi	1	0	0	6
Willis Ward	1	0	0	6
Louis Westover	1	0	0	6
Ted Petoskey	0	1	1	4
Carl Savage	0	2	0	2
Harvey Chapman	0	1	0	1

== Awards and honors ==
- Captain: Stanley Fay
- All-Americans: Chuck Bernard, Whitey Wistert, Ted Petoskey
- All-Conference: Whitey Wistert, Chuck Bernard, Ted Petoskey, Herman Everhardus
- Most Valuable Player: Herman Everhardus
- Meyer Morton Award: Mike Savage

== Coaching staff ==
- Head coach: Harry Kipke
- Assistant coaches: Jack Blott, Franklin Cappon, Ray Courtright, Cliff Keen, Bennie Oosterbaan, Walter Weber
- Trainer: Ray Roberts
- Manager: Raymond Fiske, George Duffy (assistant), Gale Sterling (assistant), Jack Dudley (assistant), Val R. Saph (assistant)
