= 1933 Ohio State Buckeyes football team =

American college football season

1933 Ohio State Buckeyes football

National champion (Dunkel System)
- Conference: Big Ten Conference
- Record: 7–1 (4–1 Big Ten)
- Head coach: Sam Willaman (5th season)
- Captain: Sid Gillman
- Home stadium: Ohio Stadium

1933 Big Ten Conference football standings
	Conf.					Overall
Team	W		L		T	W		L		T
No. 1 Michigan +	5	–	0	–	1	7	–	0	–	1
No. 3 Minnesota +	2	–	0	–	4	4	–	0	–	4
No. 5 Ohio State	4	–	1	–	0	7	–	1	–	0
No. 10 Purdue	3	–	1	–	1	6	–	1	–	1
Illinois	3	–	2	–	0	5	–	3	–	0
Iowa	3	–	2	–	0	5	–	3	–	0
Northwestern	1	–	4	–	1	1	–	5	–	2
Chicago	0	–	3	–	2	3	–	3	–	2
Indiana	0	–	3	–	2	1	–	5	–	2
Wisconsin	0	–	5	–	1	2	–	5	–	1
+ – Conference co-champions; Rankings from Dickinson System

The 1933 Ohio State Buckeyes football team was an American football team that represented Ohio State University in the 1933 Big Ten Conference football season. In their fifth and final year under head coach Sam Willaman, the Buckeyes compiled a 7–1 record (4–1 against Big Ten opponents), shut out five of eight opponents, and outscored all opponents by a total of 161 to 26. The Buckeyes' sole loss was to the undefeated Michigan Wolverines.

Ohio State finished third in the Big Ten standings behind Michigan and Minnesota. In the Dickinson System rankings released in December 1933, three Big Ten teams finished in the top five with Michigan at No. 1 with 28.53 points, Minnesota at No. 3 with 23.87 points, and Ohio State No. 5 with 22.79 points. While the great majority of later rankings and analyses designated Michigan as the 1933 national champion, the Dunkel System designated the Buckeyes as the national champion.

Three Ohio State players received honors from the Associated Press (AP) and/or the United Press (UP) on the 1933 All-Big Ten Conference football team: guard Joseph Gailus (AP-1, UP-1); tackle Ted Rosequist (AP-2, UP-1); and end Sid Gillman (AP-2).

In January 1934, Willaman resigned as Ohio State's head coach. Willaman compiled a 26–10–4 record (and lost three of five games to Michigan) in five years as Ohio State's head coach. Willaman had been heavily criticized in the months prior to his resignation.

== Schedule ==
Date	Opponent	Site	Result	Attendance	Source
October 7	Virginia*	Ohio Stadium; Columbus, OH	W 75–0	42,001	
October 14	Vanderbilt*	Ohio Stadium; Columbus, OH	W 20–0	21,568	
October 21	at Michigan	Michigan Stadium; Ann Arbor, MI (rivalry)	L 0–13	93,508	
October 28	Northwestern	Ohio Stadium; Columbus, OH	W 12–0	34,987	
November 4	Indiana	Ohio Stadium; Columbus, OH	W 21–0	23,698	
November 11	at Penn*	Franklin Field; Philadelphia, PA	W 20–7	45,000	
November 18	at Wisconsin	Camp Randall Stadium; Madison, WI	W 6–0	9,089	
November 25	Illinois	Ohio Stadium; Columbus, OH (Illibuck)	W 7–6	24,403	
*Non-conference game

== Coaching staff ==
- Sam Willaman, head coach, fifth year

== Roster ==
- Blackie Conrad, T
- Carl Cramer, QB
- Delich, G
- Joseph Gailus, G
- Sid Gillman, E
- Hipoly, E
- John Kabealo, FB
- Keefe, HB
- Meekin, HB
- Regis Monahan, G
- Marshall Oliphant, QB
- Paxtow, E
- Stan Pincura, QB
- Trevor J. Rees, E
- Ted Rosequist, T
- J. Smith, HB
- Mickey Vuchinich, C
- Damon Wetzel, FB
- Wilson, E
- Yards, T
