= Stanley Fay =

American football player and businessman (1910–1987)

- Fay in 1933

Profile
- Positions: Halfback, Quarterback

Personal information
- Born: February 18, 1910
- Died: August 31, 1987 (aged 77)
- Listed height: 5 ft 8.5 in (1.74 m)
- Listed weight: 175 lb (79 kg)

Career information
- High school: Northwestarn High School, Detroit, Michigan
- College: Michigan

Career history
- 1931–1933: Michigan

Awards and highlights
- National champion (1933); Second-team All-Big Ten (1931)

Stanley E. Fay (February 18, 1910 – August 31, 1987) was an American football player and businessman. He played at the halfback and quarterback positions for the Michigan Wolverines football teams from 1931 to 1933. He was the leading scorers for the undefeated national champion 1932 Michigan Wolverines football team and the captain of the undefeated national champion 1933 Michigan Wolverines football team. He later worked for many years with Harry Bennett at the Ford Motor Company and as a real estate agent in Detroit.

== University of Michigan ==
Fay attended Northwestarn High School in Detroit, Michigan, before enrolling at the University of Michigan. He played at the halfback and quarterback positions for the Michigan Wolverines football teams from 1931 to 1933.

In October 1931, Fay gained national media attention after scoring two touchdowns in Michigan's 21–0 win over Princeton in the first meeting between the two schools in 50 years. The United Press report on the game noted: "Stanley Fay, hard-running 175-pound halfback from Detroit, was the hero of Michigan's triumph scoring the first touchdown on a 50-yard run from a fake placement kick in the second period and clinching the contest with a seven yard dash around end for a second score in the final period."

Fay also scored two touchdowns again in Michigan's 15–6 victory over Northwestern in October 1932, putting him at the top of the Big Ten Conference individual scoring list at the time. Two weeks later, Fay scored Michigan's first two touchdowns in a 35–0 win against Illinois, the worst defeat ever suffered by a team coached by College Football Hall of Fame coach Robert Zuppke. The Associated Press account of the game noted: "Michigan stowed the game away safely in the first two periods when Stanley Fay, Wolverine halfback, registered the first two touchdowns after steady marches down the field. Fay plowed through the Illinois defense from the 11 yard line for the opening marker . . . In the second period Fay again carried the ball over . . . .from the one yard line." Fay's rushing and scoring was one of the leading offensive weapons for the undefeated national champion 1932 Michigan Wolverines football team.

When Fay was elected by his teammates as the captain of the 1933 Michigan team, newspapers reported that his election was viewed as "an augur of good luck," as Fay had never played on a losing team, either in high school or college. Following the graduation of 1932 quarterback Harry Newman, Fay was moved to the quarterback position for the 1933 season. Fay helped lead the 1933 Michigan Wolverines football team to its second consecutive undefeated season and national championship.

== Ford Motor Company ==
After graduating from Michigan, Fay worked for Ford Motor Company, beginning as an assistant to Harry Bennett, Henry Ford's most trusted lieutenant and the head of Ford's Service Department responsible for labor relations. As Bennett moved into a larger sphere of duties, Fay became Ford's personnel director. In 1943, sports writer Watson Spoelstra wrote a syndicated story about the many former athletes working at Ford. Spoelstra noted that, aside from being a famous athlete himself, Fay had many former athletes working under him: "The inner circle about Fay also includes many minds which once made split decisions under fire on whether to field an end over end punt, or to try the squeeze play."

In September 1943, Bennett and Fay became the subject of controversy as a result of the court martial trial of William Colman, the former commanding officer of Selfridge Air Base in suburban Detroit. Colman was accused of, among other things, accepting gifts in exchange for procuring a war-time transfer of Henry Ford's grandson, Benson Ford, from Fort Custer to Selfridge. Bennett testified that a shoe shining outfit had been sent to Colman by Fay but that the gift had no connection to the transfer of Benson Ford.

In September 1945, Henry Ford II removed Bennett from his executive position at Ford Motor Company, and Bennett then resigned his position on the board of directors. Fay also resigned his position at Ford. In October 1945, Bennett and Fay formed a new company, called B-G-F Manufacturers' Representatives Co., with attorney Byron Geller. The company derived its name from the first letter of the last names of the three owners. The company was reportedly dissolved four months later in February 1946.

== Later life ==
After his association with Ford and Bennett came to an end, Fay became a Detroit area real estate agent. Fay died in August 1987 at age 77. He was a resident of Franklin, Michigan at the time of his death.
