= 1933 Purdue Boilermakers football team =

American college football season

1933 Purdue Boilermakers football
- Conference: Big Ten Conference
- Record: 6–1–1 (3–1–1 Big Ten)
- Head coach: Noble Kizer (4th season)
- Captain: Dutch Fehring
- Home stadium: Ross–Ade Stadium

1933 Big Ten Conference football standings
	Conf.					Overall
Team	W		L		T	W		L		T
No. 1 Michigan +	5	–	0	–	1	7	–	0	–	1
No. 3 Minnesota +	2	–	0	–	4	4	–	0	–	4
No. 5 Ohio State	4	–	1	–	0	7	–	1	–	0
No. 10 Purdue	3	–	1	–	1	6	–	1	–	1
Illinois	3	–	2	–	0	5	–	3	–	0
Iowa	3	–	2	–	0	5	–	3	–	0
Northwestern	1	–	4	–	1	1	–	5	–	2
Chicago	0	–	3	–	2	3	–	3	–	2
Indiana	0	–	3	–	2	1	–	5	–	2
Wisconsin	0	–	5	–	1	2	–	5	–	1
+ – Conference co-champions; Rankings from Dickinson System

The 1933 Purdue Boilermakers football team was an American football team that represented Purdue University during the 1933 Big Ten Conference football season. In their fourth season under head coach Noble Kizer, the Boilermakers compiled a 6–1–1 record, finished in third place in the Big Ten Conference with a 3–1–1 record against conference opponents, and outscored opponents by a total of 109 to 37. The team lost to Iowa (6–14) and tied with Minnesota (7–7). Dutch Fehring was the team's captain.

A notable result was a 19–0 shutout win away at Notre Dame.

== Schedule ==
Date	Opponent	Site	Result	Attendance	Source
October 7	Ohio*	Ross–Ade Stadium; West Lafayette, IN	W 13–6	10,000	
October 14	at Minnesota	Memorial Stadium; Minneapolis, MN	T 7–7	26,497	
October 21	at Chicago	Stagg Field; Chicago, IL (rivalry)	W 14–0	15,000	
October 28	at Wisconsin	Camp Randall Stadium; Madison, WI	W 14–0	27,000	
November 4	Carnegie Tech*^{†}	Ross–Ade Stadium; West Lafayette, IN	W 17–7	18,000	
November 11	at Notre Dame*	Notre Dame Stadium; Notre Dame, IN (rivalry)	W 19–0	35,000	
November 18	Iowa	Ross–Ade Stadium; West Lafayette, IN	L 6–14	16,000	
November 25	at Indiana	Memorial Stadium; Bloomington, IN (Old Oaken Bucket)	W 19–3	18,000	
*Non-conference game; ^{†}Homecoming

== Roster ==
- Dave Anderson, E
- George Basker, HB
- James Carter, HB
- Leon Dailey, HB
- George Dennis, T-G
- Bob Dornte, HB
- George Duggins, E
- Paul Emmons, T-C
- George Engisch, G
- Fritz Febel, G
- Dutch Fehring, T
- Frank Haas, E
- J. F. Hecker, HB-FB
- Carl Heldt, T
- Byron Huggins, G
- Howard Keegan, HB-FB
- Art Lawrence, T-C
- Frank Loebs, E
- Emmett Lowery, E
- Larnard Mann
- John Moore, HB
- Paul Pardonner, QB
- Jim Peele, QB
- Lloyd Pekelsma, HB
- Robert Peters, G
- Duane Purvis, HB-FB
- Thomas Roy, FB
- Wayne Sandefur, G-T-K
- John Sexton, FB
- Ed Skoronski, C
- Dan Toriello, QB
- Ed Ungers, T
