= Bobby Jones (guard) =

American football player (1912–1999)

No. 55
- Position: Guard

Personal information
- Born: March 28, 1912; Wabash, Indiana, U.S.
- Died: March 25, 1999 (aged 86)
- Listed height: 6 ft 2 in (1.88 m)
- Listed weight: 215 lb (98 kg)

Career information
- High school: Wabash (Wabash, Indiana)
- College: Indiana

Career history
- Green Bay Packers (1934)

Career statistics
- Games played: 12
- Games started: 12
- Stats at Pro Football Reference

Robert Irven Jones (March 28, 1912 – March 25, 1999) was an American football guard for the Green Bay Packers of the National Football League (NFL). He played college football for Indiana.

== Biography ==
Jones was born on March 30, 1912, in Wabash, Indiana.

== Career ==
Jones played with the Green Bay Packers during the 1934 NFL season. He played at the collegiate level at Indiana University.
