= Dave Cook (American football) =

American football player (1912–)

No. 26, 22
- Position: Back

Personal information
- Born: January 1, 1912; Elgin, Illinois, U.S.
- Died: December 19, 1949 (aged 37); St. Louis, Missouri, U.S.
- Listed height: 6 ft 2 in (1.88 m)
- Listed weight: 203 lb (92 kg)

Career information
- High school: Soldan (St. Louis)
- College: Illinois

Career history
- Chicago Cardinals (1934–1936); Brooklyn Dodgers (1936)
- Stats at Pro Football Reference

David Fouts Cook (January 1, 1912 – December 19, 1949) was an American professional football back who played in the National Football League (NFL) with the Chicago Cardinals and Brooklyn Dodgers. He participated in college football, basketball, and track for the Illinois Fighting Illini.

== Early life ==
David Fouts Cook was born on January 1, 1912, in Elgin, Illinois. He attended Soldan High School in St. Louis, Missouri, where he participated in football, basketball, and track. He earned all-city honors in football as a senior in 1929. He was also an "outstanding" basketball player and had a shot put of more than 51 feet.

== College career ==
Cook participated in college football, basketball, and track for the Illinois Fighting Illini. He was a varsity letterman in football during the 1931 and 1933 seasons. He was the team MVP in 1933 as a fullback.

== Professional career ==
Cook played in 21 of 26 games, starting 16, for the Chicago Cardinals from 1934 to 1936. On October 8, 1936, Cook was traded to the Brooklyn Dodgers for Jack Robinson. Cook played in three games for the Dodgers during the 1936 season in a reserve role before dislocating his shoulder in November.

== Personal life ==
After his football career, Cook worked in the steel industry and became production manager of a munitions plant. At the time of his death, he was the associate general manager of a cosmetic manufacturing company. He died on December 15, 1949, in St. Louis, Missouri, of a liver problem resulting from an old football injury.
