= Herman Everhardus =

American football player (1912–1980)

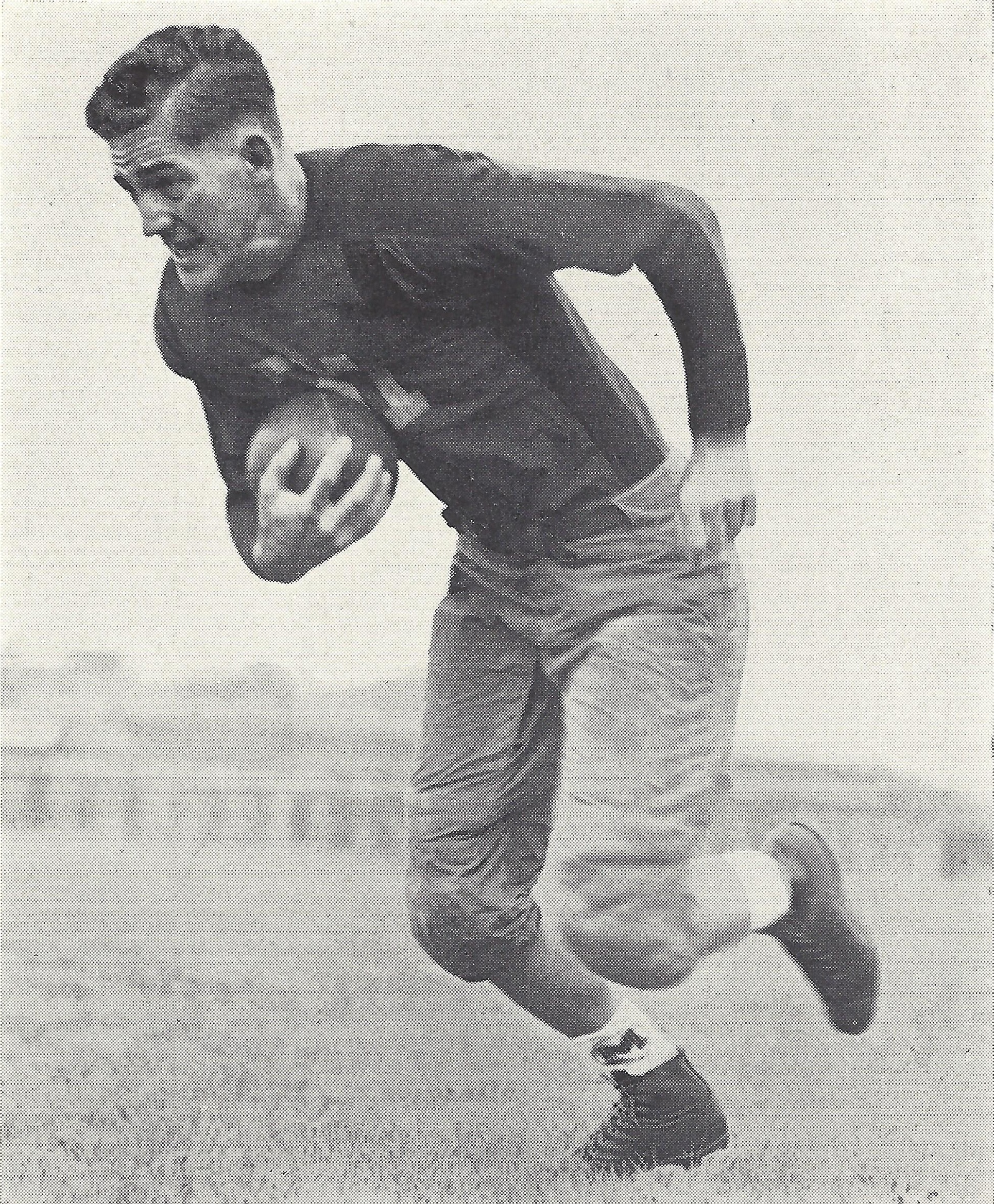

Profile
- Position: Halfback

Personal information
- Born: September 11, 1912; Kalamazoo, Michigan, U.S.
- Died: July 1980 (aged 67); Okemos, Michigan, U.S.

Career information
- College: Michigan

Awards and highlights
- National champion (1933); Second-team All-American (1933); First-team All-Big Ten (1933)

Herman "Flying Dutchman" Everhardus (September 11, 1912 – July 1980) was an American football player who played halfback for the University of Michigan teams from 1931 to 1933. He was an All-Big Ten halfback who led the conference in scoring in 1933. In his junior and senior seasons at Michigan, he led the team to two consecutive undefeated seasons and national championships. While playing football at Michigan, Everhardus was a teammate and fraternity brother of future U.S. President Gerald Ford.

== Biography ==
Everhardus was a native of Kalamazoo, Michigan, where he attended Kalamazoo Central High School. He enrolled at the University of Michigan in 1930 and was a three-year starter at halfback for the Wolverines' football teams. He became known as the "Flying Dutchman" while playing for Michigan. During his junior and senior years, the Wolverines football teams won back-to-back national championships with a two-year record of 15–0–1, outscoring opponents by a combined total of 254–31.

In 1933, Everhardus was the leading scorer in the Big Ten Conference with 64 points on eight touchdowns and ten point after touchdown kicks. He scored three touchdowns and three extra points in a 1933 game against Cornell, including a 52-yard touchdown run and an 85-yard kickoff return to open the second half. Everhardus contributed to the Wolverines' second straight undefeated season as much with his kicking as with his running. In a 10–6 win over Iowa in 1933, Everhardus had a 47-yard run and kicked for a field goal and extra-point. After the Iowa game, the Associated Press reported:

"Herman Everhardus, the flying Dutchman from Kalamazoo, unleashed a toe as true as a navy siege gun and Bill Renner displayed uncanny passing aim today as Michigan's powerful football team, playing in snow and ice, swept toward a fourth consecutive Big Ten championship with a hard-earned victory over Iowa."

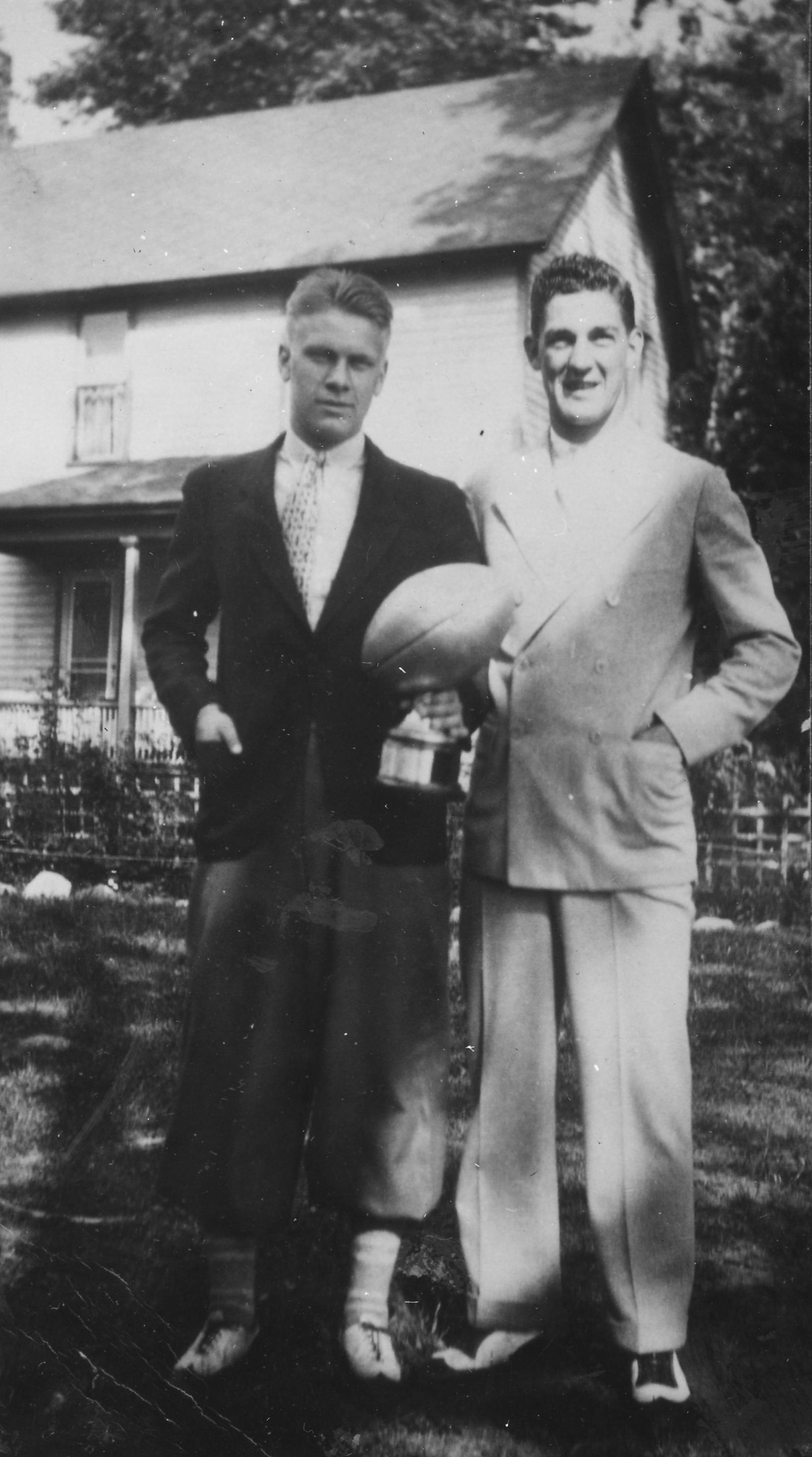
Everhardus with fraternity brother Gerald Ford, 1932

While playing for Michigan, Everhardus was a teammate and fraternity brother of future U.S. President Gerald Ford. When Ford tried out for the freshman football team, he needed a job to help pay his expenses. Everhardus arranged to get Ford a job waiting tables at the Delta Kappa Epsilon fraternity house, where Ford later became a fraternity brother of Everhardus.

At the end of the 1933 season, Everhardus was selected as a first-team back on the All-Big Ten teams selected by the United Press and the Newspaper Editors Association (NEA). He was also selected as a second-team All-American by the NEA and the International News Service. In announcing the 1933 All-Big Ten team, the United Press wrote: "Everhardus was Michigan's foremost back, with his running and stellar defensive work. He kicked three field goals in crucial games and won the Illinois game with his extra point after touchdown, 7–6." The NEA wrote the following in naming Everhardus as its first-team All-Big Ten fullback:

"The fullback post is well filled by Herman Everhardus, Michigan. Although playing a halfback post, the flying Dutchman is a typical fullback. He showed he could crash tackles and the center of the line equally as well as he could run the ends or snare a pass. Defensively, he was a Gibraltar."

Everhardus was also selected to play in both of the major post-season all-star games. On January 1, 1934, Everhardus and Michigan teammate Chuck Bernard played for the East team in the annual East-West Shrine Game in San Francisco. Although the East team lost, Everhardus was credited with "a phenomenal 70-yard punt ... which traveled 50 yards from the line in the air." And in August 1934, Everhardus was selected as a member of the College All-American team to play the annual game against the NFL champions at Soldier Field in Chicago. The College All-Americans played the NFL champion Chicago Bears to a scoreless tie, and the Associated Press cited Everhardus as one of three college stars who "stood out on the floodlighted field." In addition to his performance in the backfield, Everhardus gained attention for a 60-yard kick that pinned the Bears deep in their own territory late in the game.

After graduating from Michigan, Everhardus signed a contract to play professional football for the Detroit Lions, but obtained a release from the contract so that he could accept a position as an assistant football coach at Penn State.
