= Frank Birch (basketball) =

Frank Earl Birch (November 11, 1883) was a college football and basketball referee who first introduced signals. In 1920, he passed out cards to coaches and the press with a code of twelve gestures. He was a graduate of Earlham College. He married Margaret Johnson. He was also once mayor of Sterling, Illinois.
