= 1932 Big Ten Conference football season =

- Sport: Football
- Teams: 10
- Co-champions: Michigan, Purdue
- Season MVP: Harry Newman

Football seasons
- 1931 1933

1932 Big Ten Conference football standings
	Conf.					Overall
Team	W		L		T	W		L		T
No. 1 Michigan +	6	–	0	–	0	8	–	0	–	0
No. 4 Purdue +	5	–	0	–	1	7	–	0	–	1
No. 11 Wisconsin	4	–	1	–	1	6	–	1	–	1
No. 6 Ohio State	2	–	1	–	2	4	–	1	–	3
Northwestern	2	–	3	–	1	3	–	4	–	1
Minnesota	2	–	3	–	0	5	–	3	–	0
Illinois	2	–	4	–	0	5	–	4	–	0
Indiana	1	–	4	–	1	3	–	4	–	1
Chicago	1	–	4	–	0	3	–	4	–	1
Iowa	0	–	5	–	0	1	–	7	–	0
+ – Conference co-champions; Rankings from Dickinson System

The 1932 Big Ten Conference football season was the 37th season of college football played by the member schools of the Big Ten Conference (also known as the Western Conference) and was a part of the 1932 college football season.

Big Ten co-champion Michigan compiled a perfect 8–0 record, outscored opponents 123 to 12, shut out six of eight opponents, and allowed an average of only 1.6 points per game. Michigan quarterback Harry Newman was a consensus first-team All-American and won the Chicago Tribune Silver Football trophy as the most valuable player in the conference. Michigan was awarded the Knute K. Rockne Trophy, narrowly prevailing over USC as the national champion under the Dickinson System.

Co-champion Purdue compiled a 7–0–1 record, had the conference's leading scoring offense with an average of 20.5 points per game, and was ranked No. 4 under the Dickinson System. Fullback Roy Horstmann was Purdue's most valuable player and was selected as a first-team All-American by several selectors. End Paul Moss was a consensus first-team All-American.

== Season overview ==
=== Results and team statistics ===
Conf. Rank	Team	Head coach	DS	Overall record	Conf. record	PPG	PAG	MVP
1 (tie)	Michigan	Harry Kipke	#1	8–0	6–0	15.4	1.6	Harry Newman
1 (tie)	Purdue	Noble Kizer	#4	7–0–1	5–0–1	20.5	5.3	Roy Horstmann
3	Wisconsin	Clarence Spears	#11	6–1–1	4–1–1	18.9	6.0	Mickey McGuire
4	Ohio State	Sam Willaman	#5	4–1–3	2–1–2	11.3	5.1	Lewis Hinchman
5	Northwestern	Dick Hanley	NR	3–4–1	2–3–1	14.5	9.5	Pug Rentner
6	Minnesota	Bernie Bierman	NR	5-3	2-3	10.8	5.3	Roy Oen
7	Illinois	Robert Zuppke	NR	5–4	2–4	10.7	11.2	Gil Berry
8	Indiana	Earl C. Hayes	NR	3–4–1	1–4–1	8.1	9.5	John Keckich
9	Chicago	Amos A. Stagg	NR	3–4–1	1–4	11.9	11.8	William Cassels
10	Iowa	Ossie Solem	NR	1–7	0–5	7.8	21.4	Joe Laws

Key
DS = Ranking in the Dickinson System, a system used at the time to rank the country's best college football teams and to award the Knute Rockne Trophy to the national champion
PPG = Average of points scored per game
PAG = Average of points allowed per game
MVP = Most valuable player as voted by players on each team as part of the voting process to determine the winner of the Chicago Tribune Silver Football trophy

== All-conference players ==
The following players received first-team honors from either the Associated Press (AP) or United Press (UP) on the 1932 All-Big Ten Conference football team:

- Paul Moss, end, Purdue (AP, UP)
- Ivy Williamson, end, Michigan (AP)
- Sid Gillman, end, Ohio State (UP)
- Marshall Wells, tackle, Minnesota (AP, UP)
- Whitey Wistert, tackle, Michigan (UP)
- Ted Rosequist, tackle, Ohio State (AP)
- Greg Kabat, guard, Wisconsin (AP, UP)
- Joseph T. Gailus, guard, Ohio State (AP)
- John Oehler, guard, Purdue (UP)
- Chuck Bernard, center, Michigan (AP, UP)
- Harry Newman, quarterback, Michigan (AP, UP)
- Gil Berry, halfback, Illinois (AP, UP)
- Lew Hinchman, halfback, Ohio State (AP, UP)
- Roy Horstmann, fullback, Purdue (AP, UP)

== All-Americans ==
Two Big Ten players were consensus first-team picks on the 1932 College Football All-America Team:

- Paul Moss, end, Purdue (AP, UP, CO, AAB, NEA, INS, CP, NYS, NYT, WC, FWAA, LIB, TR, PD, PM)
- Harry Newman, quarterback, Michigan (AP, UP, CO, AAB, NEA, INS, CP, NYS, NYT, WC, FWAA, LIB, TR, PD, PM)

Other Big Ten players receiving first-team All-American honors from at least one selector were:

- Ted Petoskey, end, Michigan (AAB, WC)
- Sid Gillman, end, Ohio State (PD)
- Joseph Gailus, guard, Ohio State (PM)
- Chuck Bernard, center, Michigan (NEA, INS, FWAA)
- Roy Horstmann, fullback, Purdue (AAB, NEA, INS, NYS, NYT, WC, TR, PM)
- Jack Manders, Minnesota (CP)
