= 1932 Purdue Boilermakers football team =

American college football season

1932 Purdue Boilermakers football

Big Ten co-champion
- Conference: Big Ten Conference
- Record: 7–0–1 (5–0–1 Big Ten)
- Head coach: Noble Kizer (3rd season)
- Captain: John W. Oehler
- Home stadium: Ross–Ade Stadium

1932 Big Ten Conference football standings
	Conf.					Overall
Team	W		L		T	W		L		T
No. 1 Michigan +	6	–	0	–	0	8	–	0	–	0
No. 4 Purdue +	5	–	0	–	1	7	–	0	–	1
No. 11 Wisconsin	4	–	1	–	1	6	–	1	–	1
No. 6 Ohio State	2	–	1	–	2	4	–	1	–	3
Northwestern	2	–	3	–	1	3	–	4	–	1
Minnesota	2	–	3	–	0	5	–	3	–	0
Illinois	2	–	4	–	0	5	–	4	–	0
Indiana	1	–	4	–	1	3	–	4	–	1
Chicago	1	–	4	–	0	3	–	4	–	1
Iowa	0	–	5	–	0	1	–	7	–	0
+ – Conference co-champions; Rankings from Dickinson System

The 1932 Purdue Boilermakers football team was an American football team that represented Purdue University during the 1932 Big Ten Conference football season. In their third season under head coach Noble Kizer, the Boilermakers compiled a 7–0–1 record, finished as a co-champion in the Big Ten Conference with a 5–0–1 record against conference opponents, and outscored opponents by a total of 164 to 42.

End Paul Moss was a consensus first-team selection on the 1932 All-America team. In addition, fullback Roy Horstmann received first-team honors from the All-America Board, Newspaper Enterprise Association, International News Service, The New York Times, and Walter Camp Football Foundation.

Eight Purdue players received honors on the 1932 All-Big Ten Conference football team: Moss (AP-1; UP-1); Horstmann (AP-1; UP-1); quarterback Paul Pardonner (AP-2); halfbacks Duane Purvis (AP-2, UP-2) and Fred Hecker (UP-2); tackle Dutch Fehring (UP-2); guard John Letsinger (AP-2, UP-2); and center John Oehler (AP-2, UP-1).

== Schedule ==
Date	Opponent	Site	Result	Attendance	Source
October 1	Kansas State*	Ross–Ade Stadium; West Lafayette, IN	W 29–13		
October 8	at Minnesota	Memorial Stadium; Minneapolis, MN	W 7–0	20,000	
October 15	Wisconsin^{†}	Ross–Ade Stadium; West Lafayette, IN	W 7–6	17,000–18,000	
October 22	at Northwestern	Dyche Stadium; Evanston, IN	T 7–7	40,000	
October 29	at NYU*	Yankee Stadium; Bronx, NY	W 34–9		
November 5	at Chicago	Stagg Field; Chicago, IL (rivalry)	W 37–0	18,000	
November 12	at Iowa	Iowa Stadium; Iowa City, IA	W 18–0	5,000	
November 19	Indiana	Ross–Ade Stadium; West Lafayette, IN (Old Oaken Bucket)	W 25–7	15,000	
*Non-conference game; ^{†}Homecoming

== Roster ==
- Dick Bateman, E
- James Bolcum, C
- James Carter, HB
- George Duggins, E
- Paul Emmons, T-C
- Fritz Febel, G
- Dutch Fehring, T
- J. F. Hecker, HB-FB
- Carl Heldt, T
- Roy Horstmann, FB
- Byron Huggins, G
- John Husar, T
- Clarence Janecek, G
- Fred Keegan, QB
- Howard Keegan, HB-FB
- Roland Kurtz, FB
- John Letsinger, G
- Emmett Lowery, E
- Ben Merz, E
- John Moore, HB
- Paul Moss, E
- John Oehler, C
- Paul Pardonner, QB
- Jim Peele, QB
- Robert Peters, G
- Duane Purvis, HB-FB
- Wayne Rhodes, G
- William Riblet, HB-QB
- Ed Ungers, T
- Bryce Walton, T
- Marty Westerman, C-G
