= 1932 Minnesota Golden Gophers football team =

American college football season

1932 Minnesota Golden Gophers football
- Conference: Big Ten Conference
- Record: 5–3 (2–3 Big Ten)
- Head coach: Bernie Bierman (1st season)
- Offensive scheme: Single-wing
- MVP: Ray Oen
- Captain: Walter Hass
- Home stadium: Memorial Stadium

1932 Big Ten Conference football standings
	Conf.					Overall
Team	W		L		T	W		L		T
No. 1 Michigan +	6	–	0	–	0	8	–	0	–	0
No. 4 Purdue +	5	–	0	–	1	7	–	0	–	1
No. 11 Wisconsin	4	–	1	–	1	6	–	1	–	1
No. 6 Ohio State	2	–	1	–	2	4	–	1	–	3
Northwestern	2	–	3	–	1	3	–	4	–	1
Minnesota	2	–	3	–	0	5	–	3	–	0
Illinois	2	–	4	–	0	5	–	4	–	0
Indiana	1	–	4	–	1	3	–	4	–	1
Chicago	1	–	4	–	0	3	–	4	–	1
Iowa	0	–	5	–	0	1	–	7	–	0
+ – Conference co-champions; Rankings from Dickinson System

The 1932 Minnesota Golden Gophers football team represented the University of Minnesota in the 1932 Big Ten Conference football season. In their first year under head coach Bernie Bierman, the Golden Gophers compiled a 5–3 record, shut out three opponents, and outscored all opponents by a combined score of 86 to 42.

Center Ray Oen was selected as the team's Most Valuable Player. Tackle Marshall Wells was named All-Big Ten first team. Fullback John Baumgartner was named Academic All-Big Ten.

Total attendance for the season was 113,956, which averaged to 43,557. The season high for attendance was against Northwestern.

== Schedule ==
Date	Opponent	Site	Result	Attendance	Source
October 1	South Dakota State*	Memorial Stadium; Minneapolis, MN	W 12–0	20,000	
October 8	Purdue	Memorial Stadium; Minneapolis, MN	L 0–7	20,000	
October 15	Nebraska*	Memorial Stadium; Minneapolis, MN (rivalry)	W 7–6	18,000–18,420	
October 22	at Iowa	Iowa Stadium; Iowa City, IA (rivalry)	W 21–6	12,000	
October 29	Northwestern^{†}	Memorial Stadium; Minneapolis, MN	W 7–0	35,000	
November 5	Ole Miss*	Memorial Stadium; Minneapolis, MN	W 26–0	12,000	
November 12	at Wisconsin	Camp Randall Stadium; Madison, WI (rivalry)	L 13–20	30,000	
November 19	Michigan	Memorial Stadium; Minneapolis, MN (Little Brown Jug)	L 0–3	24,766	
*Non-conference game; ^{†}Homecoming

== Game summaries ==
=== Michigan ===
Week 8: Michigan at Minnesota

Team	1	2	3	4	Total
• Michigan	0	3	0	0	3
Minnesota	0	0	0	0	0

- Date: November 19, 1932
- Location: Memorial Stadium
  Minneapolis
- Game attendance: 30,000
- Referee: James Masker (Northwestern)

On November 19, 1932, Minnesota lost to an undefeated Michigan team at Memorial Stadium. Michigan was held to two first downs and 85 yards of total offense (67 rushing yards and 18 passing). Despite the lack of offensive production, Michigan won the game, 3–0, on a field goal at the end of the second quarter. The score was set up when Minnesota fullback Jack Manders fumbled the ball near the end of the first half. Chuck Bernard and Ted Petoskey recovered the ball at Minnesota's 23-yard line. With 36 seconds remaining in the first half, Michigan had the ball, fourth-and-goal at Minnesota's four-yard line. Harry Newman kicked the field goal, narrowly missing the upright to give Michigan the only three points scored by either team. Neither team was able to move the ball inside the other's 30-yard line in the second half. Minnesota came closest to scoring in the third quarter when All-American Pug Lund broke into the open field, but slipped and fell trying to evade Harry Newman who was the last person with a chance to stop Lund.
