= 1932 Ohio State Buckeyes football team =

American college football season

1932 Ohio State Buckeyes football
- Conference: Big Ten Conference
- Record: 4–1–3 (2–1–2 Big Ten)
- Head coach: Sam Willaman (4th season)
- Home stadium: Ohio Stadium

1932 Big Ten Conference football standings
	Conf.					Overall
Team	W		L		T	W		L		T
No. 1 Michigan +	6	–	0	–	0	8	–	0	–	0
No. 4 Purdue +	5	–	0	–	1	7	–	0	–	1
No. 11 Wisconsin	4	–	1	–	1	6	–	1	–	1
No. 6 Ohio State	2	–	1	–	2	4	–	1	–	3
Northwestern	2	–	3	–	1	3	–	4	–	1
Minnesota	2	–	3	–	0	5	–	3	–	0
Illinois	2	–	4	–	0	5	–	4	–	0
Indiana	1	–	4	–	1	3	–	4	–	1
Chicago	1	–	4	–	0	3	–	4	–	1
Iowa	0	–	5	–	0	1	–	7	–	0
+ – Conference co-champions; Rankings from Dickinson System

The 1932 Ohio State Buckeyes football team was an American football team that represented Ohio State University in the 1932 Big Ten Conference football season. In its fourth season under head coach Sam Willaman, the team compiled a 4–1–3 record (2–1–2 in conference), finished in fourth place in the Big Ten Conference, and outscored its opponents by a total of 90 to 41. In the Dickinson System ratings released at the end of the 1932 season, Ohio State was ranked No. 6.

Five Ohio State players received honors on the 1932 All-Big Ten Conference football team: halfback Lew Hinchman (AP-1, UP-1); end Sid Gillman (UP-1); tackle Ted Rosequist (AP-1; UP-2); and guards Joseph T. Gailus (AP-1, UP-2) and Martin D. Varner (AP-2).

== Schedule ==
Date	Opponent	Site	Result	Attendance	Source
October 1	Ohio Wesleyan*	Ohio Stadium; Columbus, OH	W 34–7	17,113	
October 8	Indiana	Ohio Stadium; Columbus, OH	T 7–7	17,183	
October 15	Michigan	Ohio Stadium; Columbus, OH (rivalry)	L 0–14	42,038	
October 22	at Pittsburgh*	Pitt Stadium; Pittsburgh, PA	T 0–0	30,000	
October 29	Wisconsin	Ohio Stadium; Columbus, OH	T 7–7	17,000	
November 5	at Northwestern	Dyche Stadium; Evanston, IL	W 20–6	>25,000	
November 12	Penn*	Ohio Stadium; Columbus, OH	W 19–0	19,301	
November 19	at Illinois	Memorial Stadium; Champaign, IL (Illibuck)	W 3–0	14,000	
*Non-conference game
