= 1932 Michigan Wolverines football team =

American college football season

1932 Michigan Wolverines football
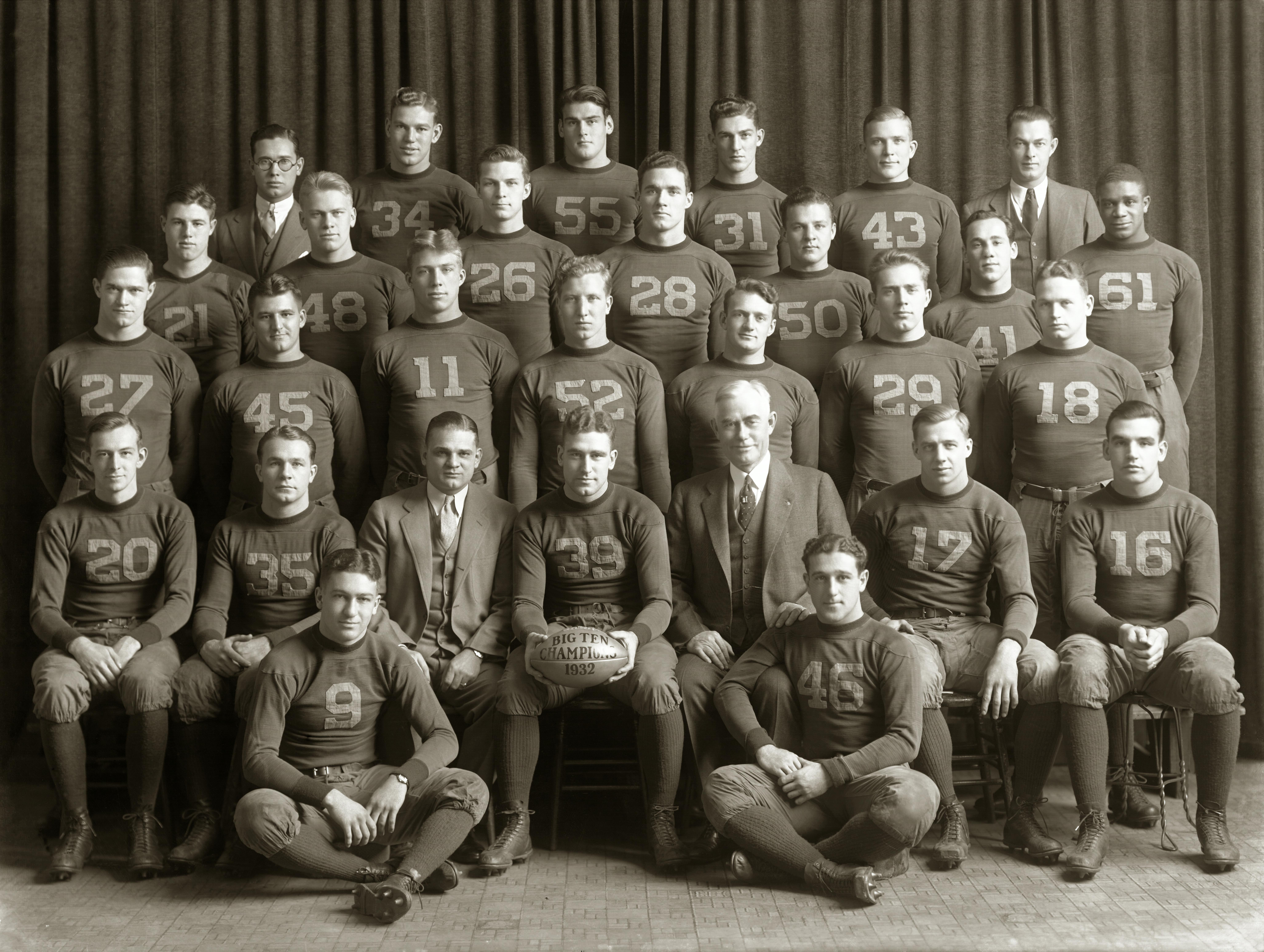

National champion (Dickinson) Co-national champion (Davis, Sagarin) Big Ten co-champion
- Conference: Big Ten Conference
- Record: 8–0 (6–0 Big Ten)
- Head coach: Harry Kipke (4th season)
- MVP: Bill Hewitt
- Captain: Ivy Williamson
- Home stadium: Michigan Stadium

Uniform
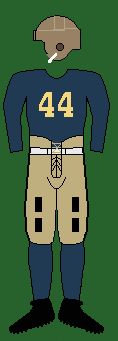

1932 Big Ten Conference football standings
| | Conf. | | | | | Overall |
| Team | W | | L | | T | W | | L | | T |
|---|---|---|---|---|---|---|---|---|---|---|
| No. 1 Michigan + | 6 | – | 0 | – | 0 | 8 | – | 0 | – | 0 |
| No. 4 Purdue + | 5 | – | 0 | – | 1 | 7 | – | 0 | – | 1 |
| No. 11 Wisconsin | 4 | – | 1 | – | 1 | 6 | – | 1 | – | 1 |
| No. 6 Ohio State | 2 | – | 1 | – | 2 | 4 | – | 1 | – | 3 |
| Northwestern | 2 | – | 3 | – | 1 | 3 | – | 4 | – | 1 |
| Minnesota | 2 | – | 3 | – | 0 | 5 | – | 3 | – | 0 |
| Illinois | 2 | – | 4 | – | 0 | 5 | – | 4 | – | 0 |
| Indiana | 1 | – | 4 | – | 1 | 3 | – | 4 | – | 1 |
| Chicago | 1 | – | 4 | – | 0 | 3 | – | 4 | – | 1 |
| Iowa | 0 | – | 5 | – | 0 | 1 | – | 7 | – | 0 |
+ – Conference co-champions; Rankings from Dickinson System

The 1932 Michigan Wolverines football team represented the University of Michigan in the 1932 Big Ten Conference football season. Under fourth-year head coach Harry Kipke, Michigan compiled a perfect 8–0 record, outscored opponents 123–12, and won both the Big Ten Conference and national championships. The defense shut out six of its eight opponents and gave up an average of only 1.6 points per game. The Knute K. Rockne Trophy was presented at the end of the season to the team deemed to be the national champion using the Dickinson System, a rating system developed by Frank G. Dickinson, a professor of economics of the University of Illinois. Michigan won the Rockne Trophy, edging Southern California in the Dickinson rating system.

On offense, quarterback Harry Newman was selected as the consensus first-team quarterback on the 1932 College Football All-America Team. He also won the Chicago Tribune Trophy as the Most Valuable Player in the Big Ten Conference, the Douglas Fairbanks Trophy as Outstanding College Player of the Year (predecessor of the Heisman Trophy), and the Helms Athletic Foundation Player of the Year Award. Newman scored all 22 points for Michigan in the last three games of the season. The Associated Press wrote, "Without Newman providing the winning spark, the Michigan team might have been just another football club."

Center Chuck Bernard and end Ted Petoskey were also selected as first-team All-Americans by some selectors. The team captain, Ivy Williamson, was selected as a second-team All-American in the Central Press Association's captains poll. Gerald Ford, who later became the 38th President of the United States, was the back-up center on the team and won the Meyer Morton Award as the most improved player in spring practice.

== Schedule ==
| Date | Opponent | Site | Result | Attendance |
|---|---|---|---|---|
| October 1 | Michigan State* | Michigan Stadium; Ann Arbor, MI (rivalry) | W 26–0 | 33,786 |
| October 8 | Northwestern | Michigan Stadium; Ann Arbor, MI (rivalry) | W 15–6 | 40,560 |
| October 15 | at Ohio State | Ohio Stadium; Columbus, OH (rivalry) | W 14–0 | 40,700 |
| October 22 | Illinois | Michigan Stadium; Ann Arbor, MI (rivalry) | W 32–0 | 19,513 |
| October 29 | Princeton*^{†} | Michigan Stadium; Ann Arbor, MI | W 14–7 | 26,424 |
| November 5 | at Indiana | Memorial Stadium; Bloomington, IN | W 7–0 | 10,440 |
| November 12 | Chicago | Michigan Stadium; Ann Arbor, MI (rivalry) | W 12–0 | 24,012 |
| November 19 | at Minnesota | Memorial Stadium; Minneapolis, MN (Little Brown Jug) | W 3–0 | 24,766 |
*Non-conference game; ^{†}Homecoming

== Pre-season ==
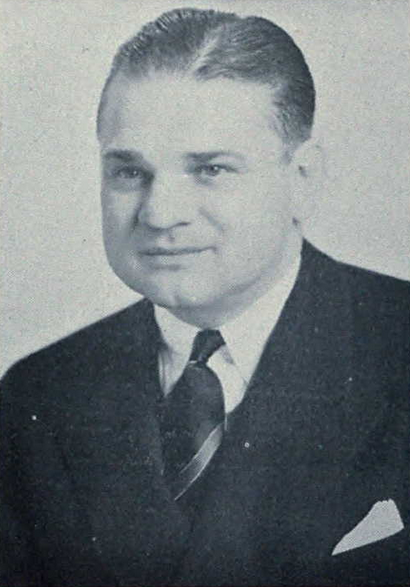
Head coach Harry Kipke

The 1931 Michigan Wolverines football team compiled a record of 8–1–1. The only first-team All-Americans from the 1931 squad, center Maynard Morrison and end Bill Hewitt, did not return to the team in 1932. In September 1932, Kenneth Conn, the sports editor of The Toledo News-Bee, wrote that Coach Harry Kipke had "sufficient reason to weep on every shoulder" as he faced the "stupendous task" of replacing his entire line from left tackle to right tackle. Conn wrote that Kipke's challenges were made worse by a "suicide schedule" and added:

"No one can accuse the Wolverines of gaining a synthetic title if they can clamor triumphantly thru that list. In fact, it looks like Michigan athletic fathers had their eyes on the financial possibilities of such a schedule rather than a victorious season for their famed 'champions of the west.'"

In mid-September 1932, the Associated Press published a feature story on the prospects of the 1932 Michigan team. The article focused on the "natural apprehension" of Coach Kipke in facing eight major opponents on eight consecutive Saturdays.

== Season summary ==
=== Week 1: Michigan State ===
Week 1: Michigan State at Michigan

| Team | 1 | 2 | 3 | 4 | Total |
|---|---|---|---|---|---|
| Michigan St. | 0 | 0 | 0 | 0 | 0 |
| • Michigan | 7 | 7 | 6 | 6 | 26 |

- Date: October 1, 1932
- Location: Michigan Stadium
  Ann Arbor, MI
- Game attendance: 33,786
- Referee: F. A. Lambert (Ohio St.)

On October 1, 1932, Michigan opened its season playing Michigan State College in Ann Arbor. Michigan won the game, 26–0. Fullback John Regeczi ran for a touchdown in the first quarter following a long drive. Additional touchdowns were scored by Stanley Fay, John Heston, and Herman Everhardus. Quarterback Harry Newman had a 35-yard punt return and successfully kicked two point after touchdown (PAT) attempts. Whitey Wistert sustained an ankle injury in the game.

Michigan's starting lineup against Michigan State was Petoskey (left end), Hildebrand (left tackle), Kowalik (left guard), Bernard (center), Marcovsky (right guard), Damm (right tackle), Williamson (right end), Newman (quarterback), Fay (left halfback), Everhardus (right halfback), and Regeczi (fullback).

=== Week 2: Northwestern ===
Week 2: Northwestern at Michigan

| Team | 1 | 2 | 3 | 4 | Total |
|---|---|---|---|---|---|
| Northwestern | 6 | 0 | 0 | 0 | 6 |
| • Michigan | 6 | 6 | 3 | 0 | 15 |

- Date: October 8, 1932
- Location: Michigan Stadium
  Ann Arbor, MI
- Game attendance: 60,000
- Referee: Dr. J. H. Nichols (Oberlin)

In the second week of the 1932 season, Michigan faced Northwestern. The two teams had not played since 1925 when Northwestern defeated Michigan, 3–2, giving Fielding H. Yost's team its only loss of the 1925 season. The game was widely anticipated, as the two teams had tied for the Western Conference championship in 1926, 1930, and 1931. The game was played at Michigan Stadium in front of 60,000 spectators and under clear skies. With All-American Pug Rentner leading the ground game, Northwestern was a heavy favorite. Northwestern outgained Michigan on the ground 105 rushing yards to 87. Northwestern also converted eight first downs in the game to only one for Michigan. Michigan, however, was able to take advantage of a Northwestern turnover to score its first touchdown. Rentner fumbled on the first play after the opening kickoff, and Ivy Williamson recovered the ball for Michigan at Northwestern's nine-yard line. With less than three minutes having run off the clock, halfback Stanley Fay scored on an eight-yard off tackle run. Michigan missed the PAT and led, 6–0. Northwestern fullback Ollie Olson threw a 22-yard touchdown pass to George Potter later in the first quarter. Northwestern's PAT kick was blocked, and the score was tied 6–6. In the second quarter, Michigan took a 12–6 lead on a 38-yard touchdown pass from Harry Newman to Stanley Fay. In the third quarter, Newman returned an Ollie Olson punt 52 yards to the Northwestern eight-yard line. Michigan was unable to score a touchdown, but Newman kicked a field goal from the 15-yard line to give Michigan its final margin of 15–6.

Michigan's starting lineup against Northwestern was Petoskey (left end), Wistert (left tackle), Kowalik (left guard), Bernard (center), Cantrill (right guard), Damm (right tackle), Williamson (right end), Newman (quarterback), Heston (left halfback), Fay (right halfback), and Regeczi (fullback).

=== Week 3: at Ohio State ===
Week 3: Michigan at Ohio State

| Team | 1 | 2 | 3 | 4 | Total |
|---|---|---|---|---|---|
| • Michigan | 7 | 7 | 0 | 0 | 14 |
| Ohio State | 0 | 0 | 0 | 0 | 0 |

- Date: October 15, 1932
- Location: Ohio Stadium
  Columbus, OH
- Game attendance: 42,000
- Referee: Frank Birch

In the third week of the 1932 season, Michigan faced Ohio State, the only team to defeat Michigan in 1931. Michigan won, 14–0, on the strength of Harry Newman's passing. Michigan's first touchdown came early in the first quarter, following a 12-yard punt by Ohio State. Taking over at the Ohio State 30-yard line, Newman passed to Herman Everhardus at the 15-yard line. Newman then threw to John Regeczi for the touchdown. In the second quarter, Newman threw a second touchdown pass to Ivy Williamson "who was standing unguarded near the goal line." Newman converted both PATs. Michigan executed a defensive strategy in the second half, seeking to preserve its 14–0 lead. Early in the third quarter, Stanley Fay prevented a touchdown, knocking the ball out of the hands of an Ohio State receiver in the end zone. Regeczi also intercepted a pass, and Michigan's defense held on several drives deep into Michigan territory. The win proved costly, as two of Michigan's halfbacks were injured in the game. Stanley Fay sustained cracked ribs and missed the next three games. Jack Heston, the son of Willie Heston, fractured a bone in his right leg and was lost for the season.

Michigan's starting lineup against Ohio State was Petoskey (left end), Wistert (left tackle), Cantrill (left guard), Bernard (center), Marcovsky (right guard), Damm (right tackle), Williamson (right end), Newman (quarterback), Fay (left halfback), Everhardus (right halfback), and Regeczi (fullback).

=== Week 4: Illinois ===
Week 4: Illinois at Michigan

| Team | 1 | 2 | 3 | 4 | Total |
|---|---|---|---|---|---|
| Illinois | 0 | 0 | 0 | 0 | 0 |
| • Michigan | 13 | 7 | 12 | 0 | 32 |

- Date: October 22, 1932
- Location: Michigan Stadium
  Ann Arbor, MI
- Game attendance: 19,513
- Referee: James Masker (Northwestern)

In the fourth week, Michigan faced Illinois in Ann Arbor. Michigan won by its largest margin of the 1932 season, 32–0.

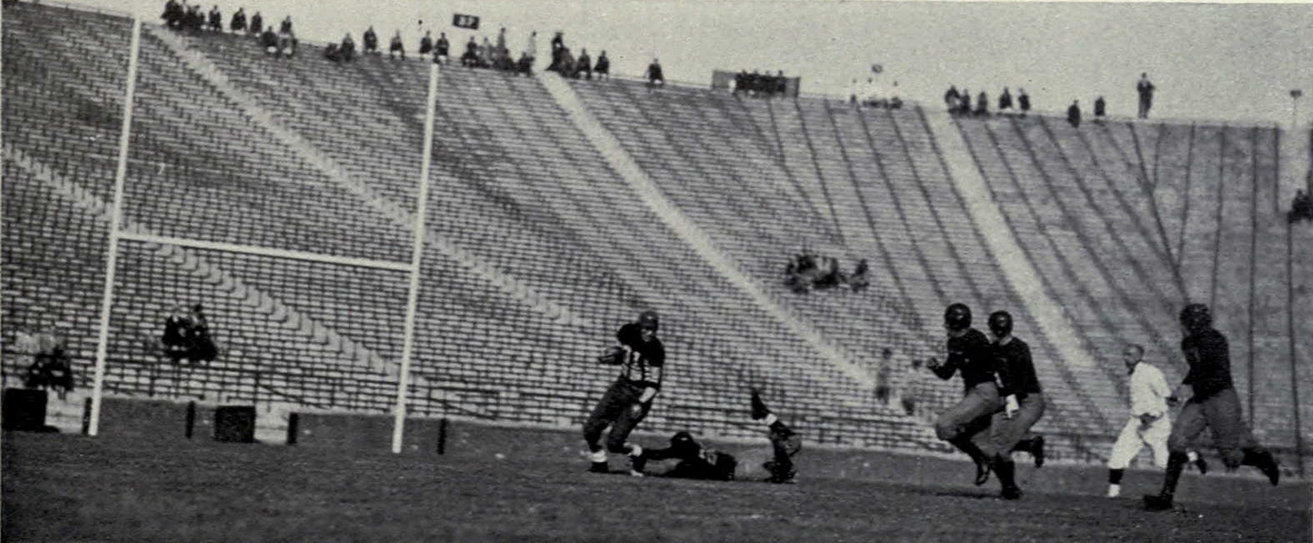
Sparse Depression era crowd at Michigan Stadium for Illinois game.

With the injury to Stanley Fay, John Regeczi was moved from fullback to right halfback, and Ted Petoskey was moved from his usual position at left end to fullback. Willis Ward, the first African-American to play for Michigan in 40 years, got his first start, replacing Petoskey at right end. Michigan's first touchdown came on a 34-yard pass play from Harry Newman to Ivy Williamson. The second touchdown came on a 56-yard run by Petoskey. Herman Everhardus ran for the third touchdown in the second period, and Michigan led 20–0 at halftime. On the opening kickoff of the second half, Newman returned the ball 76 yards to the Illinois 19-yard line. Petoskey ran for the touchdown. The final touchdown came on a pass from Newman to Williamson. Newman converted two of five PATs in the game. Michigan gained 410 yards of total offense, 296 on the ground. Petoskey led the team with 187 rushing yards on 21 carries.

Michigan's starting lineup against Illinois was Ward (left end), Wistert (left tackle), Kowalik (left guard), Bernard (center), Savage (right guard), Austin (right tackle), Williamson (right end), Newman (quarterback), Everhardus (left halfback), Regeczi (right halfback), and Petoskey (fullback).

=== Week 5: Princeton ===
Week 5: Princeton at Michigan

| Team | 1 | 2 | 3 | 4 | Total |
|---|---|---|---|---|---|
| Princeton | 0 | 7 | 0 | 0 | 7 |
| • Michigan | 0 | 2 | 6 | 6 | 14 |

- Date: October 29, 1932
- Location: Michigan Stadium
  Ann Arbor, MI
- Game attendance: 30,000
- Referee: Dr. J. H. Nichols (Oberlin)

In the fifth week, Michigan faced Princeton in Ann Arbor. The Princeton squad was coached by Fritz Crisler, who would succeed Kipke as Michigan's head coach in 1938. Princeton took a 7–2 halftime lead, but Michigan won, 14–7, after scoring two second-half touchdowns. Behind the rushing of fullback Jack James, Princeton dominated in the first half, converting seven first downs to one for Michigan. Crisler's Princeton team had prepared for Harry Newman's passing game and allowed only one completion in the game. In the second quarter, Newman fumbled a punt at the Michigan 15-yard line, and Kenneth Fairman recovered the fumble for Princeton. Halfback John F. Bales ran for the touchdown, giving Princeton a 7–0 lead. Later in the second quarter, Bales fumbled a Ted Petoskey punt at the Princeton 13-yard line. The ball rolled into the end zone, where Bales picked it up. He was tackled in the end zone by Willis Ward for a safety, cutting Princeton's lead to 7–2. In the third quarter, Ivy Williamson blocked a Princeton punt at the ten-yard line. The ball rolled into the end zone, where it was recovered by Chuck Bernard for a Michigan touchdown. Newman missed the PAT, and Michigan led 8–7. Michigan's final touchdown came on a nine-yard pass play from Newman to Ward. Newman against missed the PAT. A late drive into Michigan territory was stopped by an interception with less than a minute left in the game.

Michigan's starting lineup against Princeton was Ward (left end), Wistert (left tackle), Kowalik (left guard), Bernard (center), Marcovsky (right guard), Damm (right tackle), Williamson (right end), Newman (quarterback), Everhardus (left halfback), Regeczi (right halfback), and Petoskey (fullback).

=== Week 6: at Indiana ===
Week 6: Michigan at Indiana

| Team | 1 | 2 | 3 | 4 | Total |
|---|---|---|---|---|---|
| • Michigan | 0 | 0 | 7 | 0 | 7 |
| Indiana | 0 | 0 | 0 | 0 | 0 |

- Date: November 5, 1932
- Location: Memorial Stadium
  Bloomington, IN
- Game attendance: 18,000
- Referee: Horatio B. Hackett

For its sixth game, Michigan traveled to Bloomington, Indiana, to play the Indiana Hoosiers. Michigan won, 7–0, on a touchdown run and PAT by Harry Newman. After returning a punt to the Indiana 48-yard line, Newman dropped back on a fake pass play and then ran for a 34-yard gain. With a first down inside the Indiana one-yard line, fullback Ted Petoskey was stopped on first and second downs. On third down, Newman ran toward the sideline and into the endzone for the game's only score. On defense, the Wolverines held Indiana to 97 yards of total offense (77 rushing and 20 passing) and intercepted five of Indiana's 13 pass attempts.

Michigan's starting lineup against Indiana was Ward (left end), Wistert (left tackle), Savage (left guard), Bernard (center), Cantrill (right guard), Austin (right tackle), Williamson (right end), Newman (quarterback), Regeczi (left halfback), Everhardus (right halfback), and Petoskey (fullback).

=== Week 7: Chicago ===
Week 7: Chicago at Michigan

| Team | 1 | 2 | 3 | 4 | Total |
|---|---|---|---|---|---|
| Chicago | 0 | 7 | 0 | 0 | 7 |
| • Michigan | 6 | 0 | 0 | 6 | 12 |

- Date: November 12, 1932
- Location: Michigan Stadium
  Ann Arbor, MI
- Game attendance: 34,500
- Referee: Fred Gardner (Cornell)

Michigan played its final home game against the University of Chicago on November 12, 1932. Michigan won, 12–0. The game was played in the snow and with a cold wind blowing at Michigan Stadium. Michigan's first touchdown came in the second quarter on a 70-yard punt return down the middle of the field by Harry Newman. The second touchdown was also scored by Newman, this time in the last minute of the game on a 28-yard run off a fake pass play. Both PAT attempts failed. The game was the last by Chicago head coach Amos Alonzo Stagg against Michigan. In a pre-game ceremony, members of the 1905 Michigan Wolverines football team presented Stagg with a silver pitcher and ten silver glasses.

Michigan's starting lineup against Chicago was Ward (left end), Wistert (left tackle), Savage (left guard), Bernard (center), Cantrill (right guard), Austin (right tackle), Williamson (right end), Newman (quarterback), Everhardus (left halfback), Fay (right halfback), and Petoskey (fullback).

=== Week 8: at Minnesota ===
Week 8: Michigan at Minnesota

| Team | 1 | 2 | 3 | 4 | Total |
|---|---|---|---|---|---|
| • Michigan | 0 | 3 | 0 | 0 | 3 |
| Minnesota | 0 | 0 | 0 | 0 | 0 |

- Date: November 19, 1932
- Location: Memorial Stadium
  Minneapolis, MN
- Game attendance: 30,000
- Referee: James Masker (Northwestern)

On November 19, 1932, Michigan concluded its undefeated season with a road game against Minnesota. Michigan was held to two first downs and 85 yards of total offense (67 rushing yards and 18 passing). Despite the lack of offensive production, Michigan won the game, 3–0, on a field goal at the end of the second quarter. The score was set up when Minnesota fullback Jack Manders fumbled the ball near the end of the first half. Chuck Bernard and Ted Petoskey recovered the ball at Minnesota's 23-yard line. With 36 seconds remaining in the first half, Michigan had the ball, fourth-and-goal at Minnesota's four-yard line. Harry Newman kicked the field goal, narrowly missing the upright to give Michigan the only three points scored by either team. Neither team was able to move the ball inside the other's 30-yard line in the second half. Minnesota came closest to scoring in the third quarter when All-American Pug Lund broke into the open field, but slipped and fell trying to evade Harry Newman who was the last person with a chance to stop Lund.

Michigan's starting lineup against Minnesota was Petoskey (left end), Wistert (left tackle), Savage (left guard), Bernard (center), Cantrill (right guard), Austin (right tackle), Williamson (right end), Newman (quarterback), Everhardus (left halfback), Fay (right halfback), and Regeczi (fullback).

== Postseason ==
=== Rockne Trophy ===
Eight teams finished the 1932 college football season with unbeaten and untied records: Auburn, Colgate, Centenary, Jefferson (Texas), Michigan, Valparaiso, Southern California, and Brown. The Knute K. Rockne Trophy was presented at the end of the season to the team deemed to be the national champion using the Dickinson System, a rating model developed by Frank G. Dickinson, and economics professor at the University of Illinois. On November 28, 1932, Professor Dickinson announced that the field of teams eligible for the Rockne Trophy had been narrowed to Michigan, Pittsburgh (despite two ties), and Southern California. On December 10, 1932, Professor Dickinson released the final results. Michigan won the Rockne Trophy as the best team in the country with a score of 28.47 points. Southern California placed second with a rating of 26.81 points, and Pitt finished third with 26.49 points.

== Players ==
=== Varsity letter winners ===
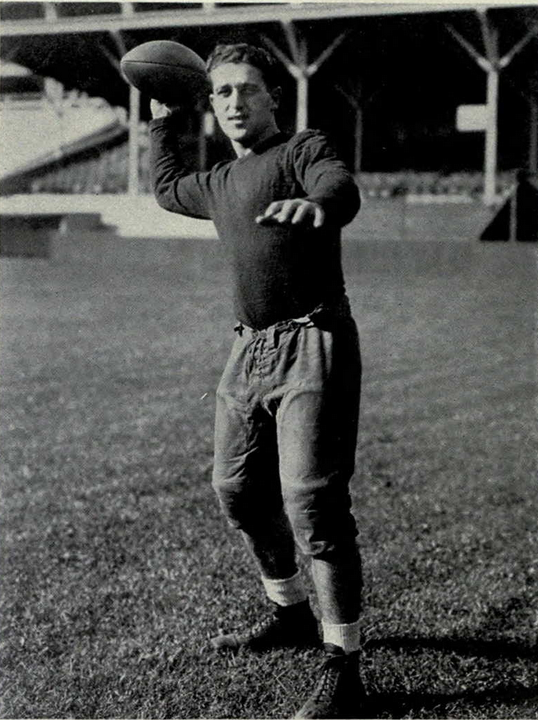
Big Ten MVP Harry Newman

- Thomas D. Austin - started 4 games at right tackle (also substitute against Princeton)
- Chuck Bernard - started 8 games at center
- Cecil Cantrill Jr. - started 5 games at right guard (also substitute against Princeton)
- Harvey E. Chapman - tackle
- Roderick Cox - fullback (substitute against Princeton)
- Russell Damm - started 4 games at right tackle
- Charles DeBaker - halfback
- Herman Everhardus - started 5 games at left halfback
- Stanley Fay - started 4 games at right halfback, 2 games at left halfback
- Gerald Ford - center
- Russell J. Fuog - guard
- John P. Heston - started 2 games at right halfback
- Willard Hildebrand - started 1 game at left tackle
- John Kowalik - started 4 games at left guard
- Abe S. Marcovsky - started 2 games at right guard, 1 game at left guard
- Harry Newman - started 8 games at quarterback
- Russell D. Oliver - fullback
- Fred Petoskey - started 4 games at left end, 4 games at fullback
- John Regeczi - started 4 games at fullback, 2 games at right halfback, 1 game at left halfback
- Carl Munro Savage - started 3 games at left guard, 1 game at right guard (also substitute against Princeton)
- Oscar A. Singer - guard
- Willis Ward - started 3 games at left end, 1 game at right end
- Louis Westover - halfback (substitute against Princeton)
- Ivan Williamson - started 7 games at right end, 1 game at left end
- Francis Wistert - started 7 games at left tackle
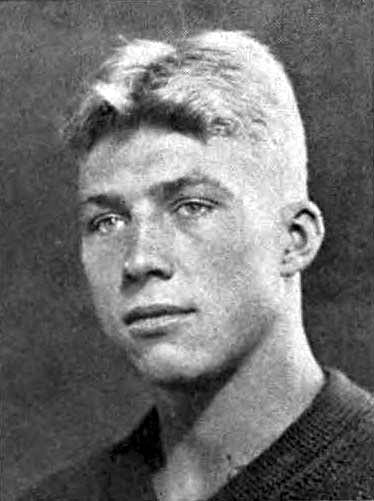
All-Big 10 tackle Whitey Wistert

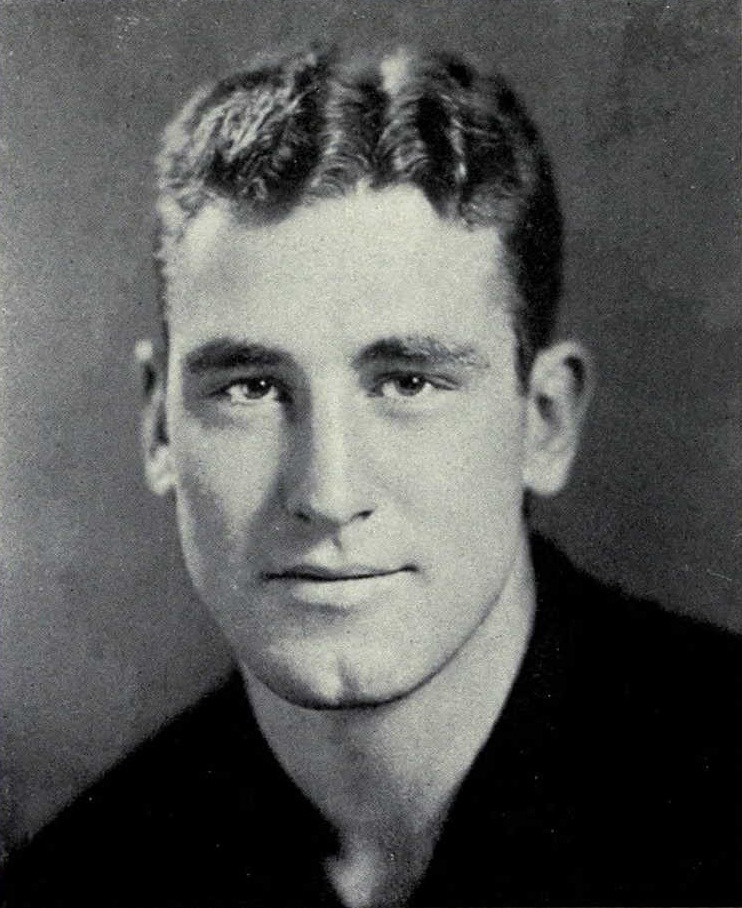
Team captain Ivy Williamson

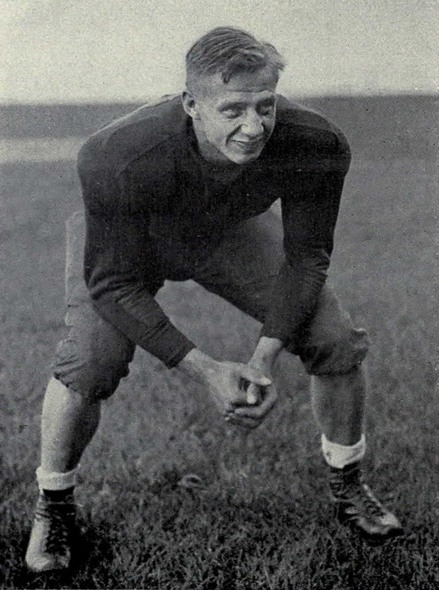
All-American end Ted Petoskey

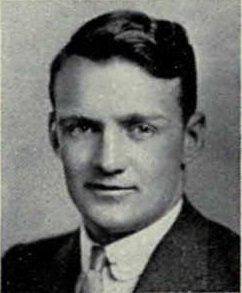
Guard Carl Savage

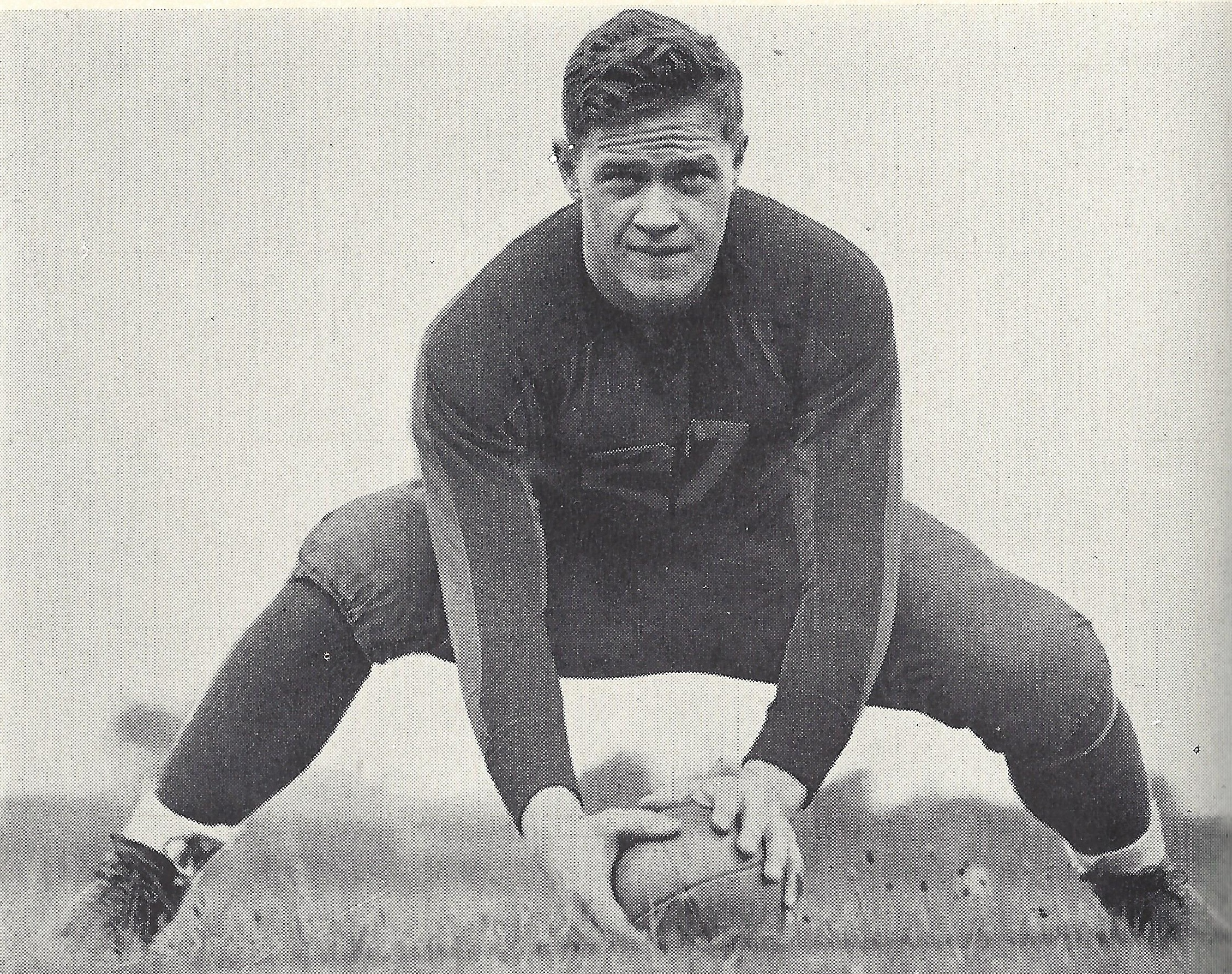
All-American center Chuck Bernard

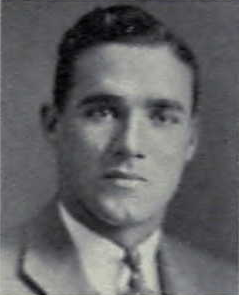
Guard Cecil Cantrill Jr.

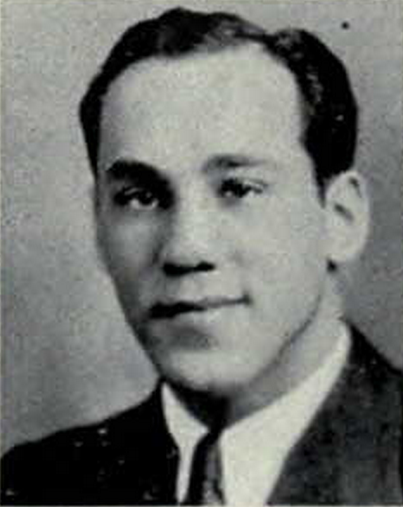
Guard Abe S. Marcovsky

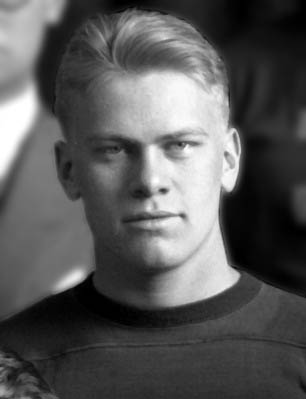
Backup center Gerald Ford

=== Varsity reserves ===
- Gunnarde Antell - end
- William F. Borgmann - guard
- Benjamin P. Jacobs - quarterback
- Tage Jacobson - tackle
- William A. McClintic - center
- Leonard Meldman - fullback
- Robert E. Miller - tackle
- Louis J. Ottoman - end
- Hilton A. Ponto - guard
- Lee C. Shaw - quarterback
- Sylvester C. Shea - end
- Frank P. Zendizian - halfback

=== Scoring leaders ===
| Player | Touchdowns | Extra points | Field goals | Points |
|---|---|---|---|---|
| Harry Newman | 3 | 7 | 2 | 28 |
| Stanley Fay | 3 | 0 | 0 | 18 |
| Ivy Williamson | 3 | 0 | 0 | 18 |
| Herman Everhardus | 2 | 0 | 0 | 12 |
| Ted Petoskey | 2 | 0 | 0 | 12 |
| John Regeczi | 2 | 0 | 0 | 12 |
| Chuck Bernard | 1 | 0 | 0 | 6 |
| John Heston | 1 | 0 | 0 | 6 |
| Willis Ward | 1 | 0 | 0 | 6 |

== Awards and honors ==
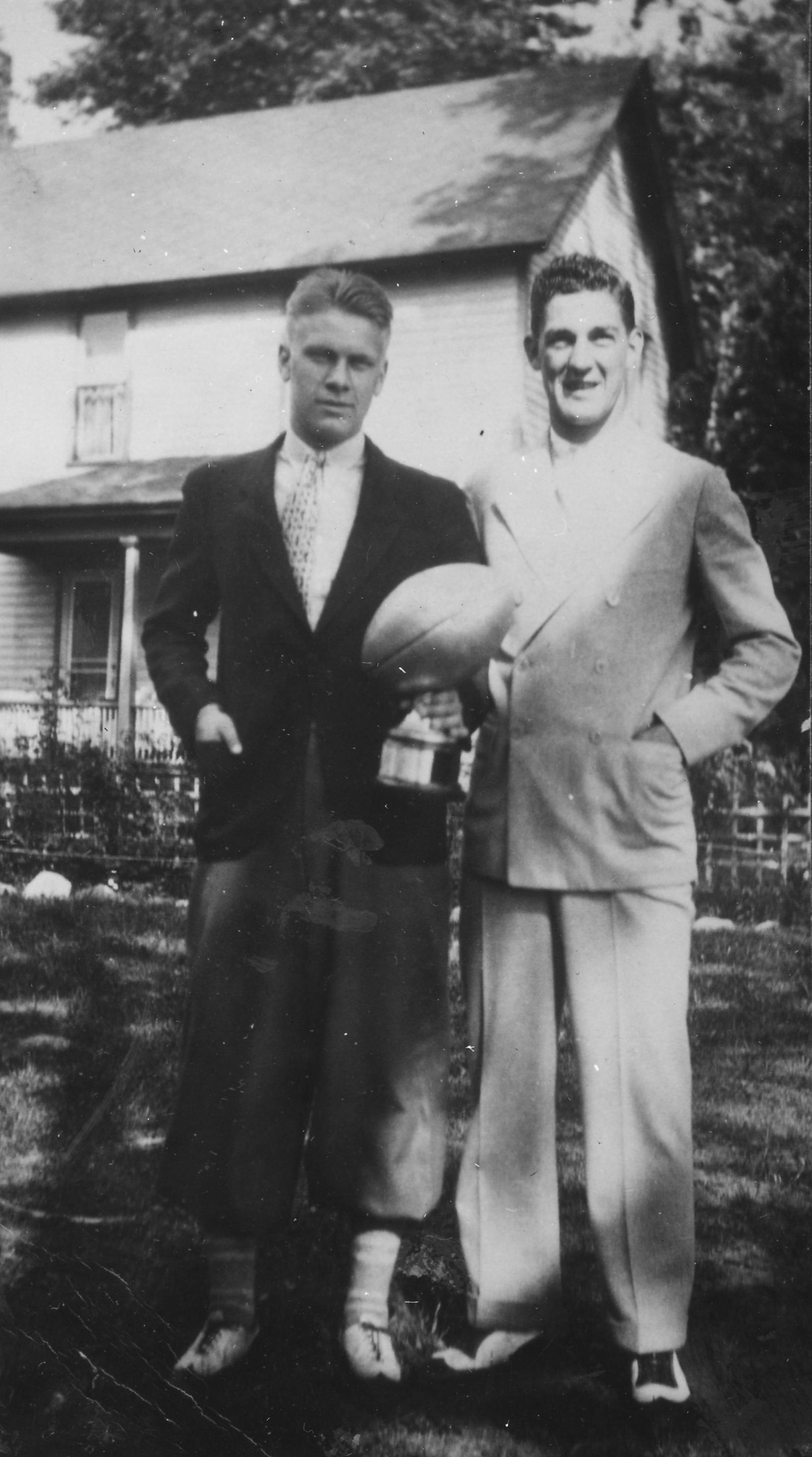
Gerald Ford (left) holding Meyer Morton Award with Herman Everhardus, 1932

- Captain: Ivan Williamson
- All-Americans: Harry Newman, Chuck Bernard, Ted Petoskey
- All-Conference: Harry Newman, Ivan Williamson, Whitey Wistert, Chuck Bernard
- Most Valuable Player: Harry Newman
- Meyer Morton Award: Gerald Ford

== Coaching staff ==
- Head coach: Harry Kipke
- Assistant coaches: Jack Blott, Franklin Cappon, Ray Courtright, Cliff Keen, Bennie Oosterbaan, Walter Weber
- Trainer: Ray Roberts
- Manager: Louis Colombo Jr., Al Piper (assistant), Ray Fiske (assistant), Jack Beal (assistant), Richard White (assistant)
