= 1932 Wisconsin Badgers football team =

American college football season

1932 Wisconsin Badgers football
- Conference: Big Ten Conference
- Record: 6–1–1 (4–1–1 Big Ten)
- Head coach: Clarence Spears (1st season)
- MVP: Mickey McGuire
- Captain: Greg Kabat
- Home stadium: Camp Randall Stadium

1932 Big Ten Conference football standings
	Conf.					Overall
Team	W		L		T	W		L		T
No. 1 Michigan +	6	–	0	–	0	8	–	0	–	0
No. 4 Purdue +	5	–	0	–	1	7	–	0	–	1
No. 11 Wisconsin	4	–	1	–	1	6	–	1	–	1
No. 6 Ohio State	2	–	1	–	2	4	–	1	–	3
Northwestern	2	–	3	–	1	3	–	4	–	1
Minnesota	2	–	3	–	0	5	–	3	–	0
Illinois	2	–	4	–	0	5	–	4	–	0
Indiana	1	–	4	–	1	3	–	4	–	1
Chicago	1	–	4	–	0	3	–	4	–	1
Iowa	0	–	5	–	0	1	–	7	–	0
+ – Conference co-champions; Rankings from Dickinson System

The 1932 Wisconsin Badgers football team was an American football team that represented the University of Wisconsin in the 1932 Big Ten Conference football season. The team compiled a 6–1–1 record (4–1–1 against conference opponents), finished in third place in the Big Ten Conference, outscored all opponents by a combined total of 151 to 48, and was ranked No. 11 at the end of the season under the Dickinson System. Clarence Spears was in his first year as Wisconsin's head coach.

Guard Greg Kabat was selected by the Associated Press (AP) and United Press (UP) as a first-team player on the 1932 All-Big Ten Conference football team. Kabat was also the team captain.

In the annual rivalry game with Minnesota, halfback Walter "Mickey" McGuire scored all three touchdowns, including an 85-yard return of the opening kickoff and the game-winning touchdown reception with seconds remaining, as the Badgers defeated the Gophers, 20–13. McGuire was selected as the team's most valuable player, and he was also selected by the AP and UP as a second-team All-Big Ten halfback.

The team played its home games at Camp Randall Stadium. The capacity was reduced from 38,293 to 32,700 for the 1932 season. During the 1932 season, the average attendance at home games was 16,344.

== Schedule ==
Date	Opponent	Site	Result	Attendance	Source
October 1	Marquette*	Camp Randall Stadium; Madison, WI	W 7–2	25,000	
October 8	Iowa	Camp Randall Stadium; Madison, WI (rivalry)	W 34–0	13,000	
October 15	at Purdue	Ross–Ade Stadium; West Lafayette, IN	L 6–7	17,000–18,000	
October 22	Coe*	Camp Randall Stadium; Madison, WI	W 39–0	14,500	
October 29	at Ohio State	Ohio Stadium; Columbus, OH	T 7–7	17,000	
November 5	Illinois^{†}	Camp Randall Stadium; Madison, WI	W 20–12	23,000	
November 12	at Minnesota	Camp Randall Stadium; Madison, WI (rivalry)	W 20–13	30,000	
November 19	at Chicago	Stagg Field; Chicago, IL	W 18–7	20,000	
*Non-conference game; ^{†}Homecoming
