= 1932 Northwestern Wildcats football team =

American college football season

1932 Northwestern Wildcats football
- Conference: Big Ten Conference
- Record: 3–4–1 (2–3–1 Big Ten)
- Head coach: Dick Hanley (6th season)
- Captain: Ernest "Pug" Rentner
- Home stadium: Dyche Stadium

1932 Big Ten Conference football standings
	Conf.					Overall
Team	W		L		T	W		L		T
No. 1 Michigan +	6	–	0	–	0	8	–	0	–	0
No. 4 Purdue +	5	–	0	–	1	7	–	0	–	1
No. 11 Wisconsin	4	–	1	–	1	6	–	1	–	1
No. 6 Ohio State	2	–	1	–	2	4	–	1	–	3
Northwestern	2	–	3	–	1	3	–	4	–	1
Minnesota	2	–	3	–	0	5	–	3	–	0
Illinois	2	–	4	–	0	5	–	4	–	0
Indiana	1	–	4	–	1	3	–	4	–	1
Chicago	1	–	4	–	0	3	–	4	–	1
Iowa	0	–	5	–	0	1	–	7	–	0
+ – Conference co-champions; Rankings from Dickinson System

The 1932 Northwestern Wildcats team represented Northwestern University during the 1932 Big Ten Conference football season. In their sixth year under head coach Dick Hanley, the Wildcats compiled a 3–4–1 record (2–3–1 against Big Ten Conference opponents) and finished in fifth place in the Big Ten Conference.

== Schedule ==
Date	Opponent	Site	Result	Attendance	Source
October 1	Missouri*	Dyche Stadium; Evanston, IL	W 27–0		
October 8	at Michigan	Michigan Stadium; Ann Arbor, MI (rivalry)	L 6–15	55,000	
October 15	at Illinois	Memorial Stadium; Champaign, IL (rivalry)	W 26–0	25,369	
October 22	Purdue	Dyche Stadium; Evanston, IL	T 7–7	40,000	
October 29	Minnesota	Dyche Stadium; Evanston, IL	L 0–7	35,000	
November 5	Ohio State^{†}	Dyche Stadium; Evanston, IL	L 6–20	>25,000	
November 12	at Notre Dame*	Notre Dame Stadium; Notre Dame, IN (rivalry)	L 0–21	42,000	
November 19	Iowa	Dyche Stadium; Evanston, IL	W 44–6	15,000	
*Non-conference game; ^{†}Homecoming
