= 1932 Indiana Hoosiers football team =

American college football season

1932 Indiana Hoosiers football
- Conference: Big Ten Conference
- Record: 3–4–1 (1–4–1 Big Ten)
- Head coach: Earl C. Hayes (2nd season)
- MVP: John Keckich
- Home stadium: Memorial Stadium

1932 Big Ten Conference football standings
	Conf.					Overall
Team	W		L		T	W		L		T
No. 1 Michigan +	6	–	0	–	0	8	–	0	–	0
No. 4 Purdue +	5	–	0	–	1	7	–	0	–	1
No. 11 Wisconsin	4	–	1	–	1	6	–	1	–	1
No. 6 Ohio State	2	–	1	–	2	4	–	1	–	3
Northwestern	2	–	3	–	1	3	–	4	–	1
Minnesota	2	–	3	–	0	5	–	3	–	0
Illinois	2	–	4	–	0	5	–	4	–	0
Indiana	1	–	4	–	1	3	–	4	–	1
Chicago	1	–	4	–	0	3	–	4	–	1
Iowa	0	–	5	–	0	1	–	7	–	0
+ – Conference co-champions; Rankings from Dickinson System

The 1932 Indiana Hoosiers football team was an American football team that represented the Indiana University in the 1932 Big Ten Conference football season. In its second season under head coach Earl C. Hayes, the team compiled a 3–4–1 record (1–4–1 against conference opponents), finished in eighth place in the Big Ten Conference, and was outscored by a total of 76 to 65. The team played its home games at Memorial Stadium in Bloomington, Indiana.

== Schedule ==
Date	Opponent	Site	Result	Attendance	Source
October 1	Ohio*	Memorial Stadium; Bloomington, IN	W 7–6	9,000	
October 8	at Ohio State	Ohio Stadium; Columbus, OH	T 7–7	17,183	
October 15	Iowa	Memorial Stadium; Bloomington, IN	W 12–0	10,000	
October 22	at Chicago	Stagg Field; Chicago, IL	L 7–13	22,000	
October 29	Mississippi State*	Memorial Stadium; Bloomington, IN	W 19–0	3,500	
November 5	Michigan	Memorial Stadium; Bloomington, IN	L 0–7	15,000	
November 12	at Illinois	Memorial Stadium; Champaign, IL (rivalry)	L 6–18	8,400	
November 19	at Purdue	Ross–Ade Stadium; West Lafayette, IN (Old Oaken Bucket)	L 7–25	15,000	
*Non-conference game
