= 1932 Iowa Hawkeyes football team =

American college football season

1932 Iowa Hawkeyes football
- Conference: Big Ten Conference
- Record: 1–7 (0–5 Big Ten)
- Head coach: Ossie Solem (1st season)
- MVP: Joe Laws
- Captain: Marcus Magnussen
- Home stadium: Iowa Stadium

1932 Big Ten Conference football standings
	Conf.					Overall
Team	W		L		T	W		L		T
No. 1 Michigan +	6	–	0	–	0	8	–	0	–	0
No. 4 Purdue +	5	–	0	–	1	7	–	0	–	1
No. 11 Wisconsin	4	–	1	–	1	6	–	1	–	1
No. 6 Ohio State	2	–	1	–	2	4	–	1	–	3
Northwestern	2	–	3	–	1	3	–	4	–	1
Minnesota	2	–	3	–	0	5	–	3	–	0
Illinois	2	–	4	–	0	5	–	4	–	0
Indiana	1	–	4	–	1	3	–	4	–	1
Chicago	1	–	4	–	0	3	–	4	–	1
Iowa	0	–	5	–	0	1	–	7	–	0
+ – Conference co-champions; Rankings from Dickinson System

The 1932 Iowa Hawkeyes football team was an American football team that represented the University of Iowa as a member of the Big Ten Conference during the 1932 Big Ten football season. In their first season under head coach Ossie Solem, the Hawkeyes compiled a 1–7 record (0–5 in conference games), finished in last place in the Big Ten, and were outscored by a total of 171 to 62.

The team played its home games at Iowa Stadium (later renamed Kinnick Stadium) in Iowa City, Iowa.

== Schedule ==
Date	Opponent	Site	Result	Attendance	Source
October 1	Bradley Tech*	Iowa Stadium; Iowa City, IA	W 31–7	6,000	
October 8	at Wisconsin	Camp Randall Stadium; Madison, WI (rivalry)	L 0–34	13,000	
October 15	at Indiana	Memorial Stadium; Bloomington, IN	L 0–12	10,000	
October 22	Minnesota^{†}	Iowa Stadium; Iowa City, IA (rivalry)	L 6–21	12,000	
October 28	at George Washington*	Griffith Stadium; Washington, DC	L 6–21	11,000	
November 5	Nebraska*	Iowa Stadium; Iowa City, IA (rivalry)	L 13–14	3,000–6,000	
November 12	Purdue	Iowa Stadium; iowa City, IA	L 0–18	5,000	
November 19	at Northwestern	Dyche Stadium; Evanston, IL	L 6–44	15,000	
*Non-conference game; ^{†}Homecoming
