= 1932 Illinois Fighting Illini football team =

American college football season

1932 Illinois Fighting Illini football
- Conference: Big Ten Conference
- Record: 5–4 (2–4 Big Ten)
- Head coach: Robert Zuppke (20th season)
- MVP: Gilbert Berry
- Captain: Gilbert Berry
- Home stadium: Memorial Stadium

1932 Big Ten Conference football standings
	Conf.					Overall
Team	W		L		T	W		L		T
No. 1 Michigan +	6	–	0	–	0	8	–	0	–	0
No. 4 Purdue +	5	–	0	–	1	7	–	0	–	1
No. 11 Wisconsin	4	–	1	–	1	6	–	1	–	1
No. 6 Ohio State	2	–	1	–	2	4	–	1	–	3
Northwestern	2	–	3	–	1	3	–	4	–	1
Minnesota	2	–	3	–	0	5	–	3	–	0
Illinois	2	–	4	–	0	5	–	4	–	0
Indiana	1	–	4	–	1	3	–	4	–	1
Chicago	1	–	4	–	0	3	–	4	–	1
Iowa	0	–	5	–	0	1	–	7	–	0
+ – Conference co-champions; Rankings from Dickinson System

The 1932 Illinois Fighting Illini football team was an American football team that represented the University of Illinois during the 1932 Big Ten Conference football season. In their 20th season under head coach Robert Zuppke, the Illini compiled a 5–4 record and finished in seventh place in the Big Ten Conference. Halfback Gil Berry was selected as the team's most valuable player. He was also the team captain.

== Schedule ==
Date	Opponent	Site	Result	Attendance	Source
October 1	Miami (OH)*	Memorial Stadium; Champaign, IL	W 20–7	4,568	
October 1	Coe*	Memorial Stadium; Champaign, IL	W 13–0	4,568	
October 8	Bradley*	Memorial Stadium; Champaign, IL	W 20–0	41,256	
October 15	Northwestern	Memorial Stadium; Champaign, IL (rivalry)	L 0–26	25,369	
October 22	at Michigan	Michigan Stadium; Ann Arbor, MI (rivalry)	L 0–32	19,513	
October 29	at Chicago	Stagg Field; Chicago, IL	W 13–7	16,139	
November 5	at Wisconsin	Camp Randall Stadium; Madison, WI	L 12–20	23,000	
November 12	Indiana	Memorial Stadium; Champaign, IL (rivalry)	W 18–6	8,400	
November 19	Ohio State	Memorial Stadium; Champaign, IL (Illibuck)	L 0–3	14,000	
*Non-conference game
