= Wally Weber =

American football player and coach (1903–1984)

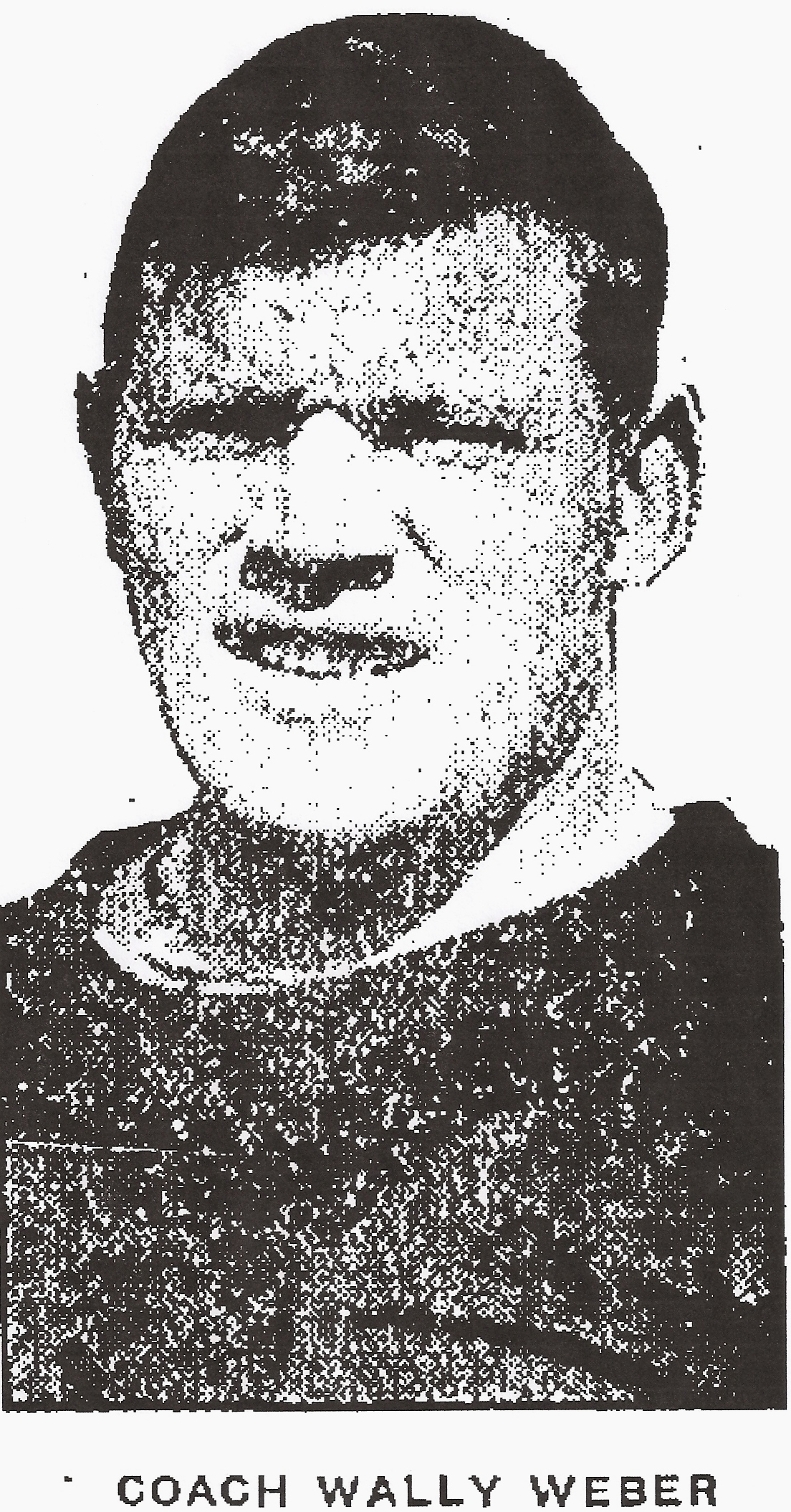
- Weber as Benton Harbor High School coach, 1929

Biographical details
- Born: February 27, 1903; Mount Clemens, Michigan, U.S.
- Died: April 14, 1984 (aged 81); Michigan, U.S.

Playing career
- 1925–1926: Michigan
- Positions: Halfback, fullback

Coaching career (HC unless noted)
- 1927–1930: Benton Harbor HS (MI)
- 1931–1958: Michigan (assistant)

Walter J. Weber (February 27, 1903 – April 14, 1984) was an American football player and coach at the University of Michigan. He played halfback and fullback for the Wolverines in 1925 and 1926 on the same teams as Benny Friedman and Bennie Oosterbaan. He later became an assistant football coach at Michigan for 28 years from 1931 to 1958. He continued to work for the University of Michigan in recruiting and alumni relations and as an instructor of physical education until his retirement in 1972. He also provided color commentary on WPAG radio's broadcasts of Michigan football games with Bob Ufer. From 1927 to 1930, he was football coach at Benton Harbor High School, leading the Tigers to the state championship in 1929. He was inducted into the University of Michigan Athletic Hall of Honor in 1981 as part of the fourth group of inductees. Only seven football players were inducted into the Hall of Honor before Weber.

== Football player at Michigan ==
A native of Mount Clemens, Michigan, Weber played football at Michigan in 1925 and 1926 as a halfback and fullback in the same backfield with College and Pro Football Hall of Famer Benny Friedman and College Hall of Famer Bennie Oosterbaan. In 1927, Weber scored two touchdowns against Wisconsin in Fielding H. Yost's last game as Michigan's football coach (also the last Michigan football game played at Ferry Field). Michigan won the game, 37–0. The next week, Michigan played Ohio State in Columbus, and an anxious Weber was quoted as saying to Oosterbaan, "Ben, at this rate they're going to beat us 40-0." Oosterbaan reportedly replied, "Dammit, Wally, we haven't had the ball yet."

Having played with Friedman and Oosterbaan, Weber once modestly noted that "my sole function in the drama was to inflate the ball." Weber later recalled that the 1925 and 1926 teams with Oosterbaan and Friedman helped build the demand for Michigan football: "We were so good, we created the demand for the new stadium. Ferry Field had a capacity of 45,000 and that wasn't nearly big enough to handle the crowds who wanted to see us play. So they had to build the new stadium."

In 1925 or 1926, a rule change was instituted so that players did not need to pursue a fumble out-of-bounds attempting to gain possession. During a game after the rule change, Weber reportedly scrambled after a fumble out-of-bounds, across the track surrounding the gridiron at Ferry Field. Weber scraped his face, hands and arms with the cinders from the track. When he handed the ball to an official, the official said, “Weber, you dummy, don't you know the rule changed this year and the ball belonged to Michigan when it went out of bounds?” Weber replied, “Sure I knew, but I wasn't sure you did.” Asked in 1977 about how modern football players differed from his era, Weber conceded that modern players were bigger and stronger, yet noted: "But players had more stamina in the old football game. A Harmon played it all the way. An Oosterbaan played it all the way. A Weber played it all the way. Sixty minutes, no breaks."

== Football coach at Benton Harbor ==
After graduating, Weber was a high school football coach for four years at Benton Harbor, Michigan from 1927 to 1930. His team lost only one game in 1928 and won the state football championship in 1929, as the "Weber machine swept through the entire campaign." Weber coached future All-American Chuck Bernard in high school at Benton Harbor and later coached him in college at Michigan. Another of Weber's players from Benton Harbor, Art Buss, went on to play at Michigan State and in the NFL from 1934 to 1937 for the Chicago Bears and Philadelphia Eagles. When he left in 1931 to accept a job at Michigan, the Benton Harbor newspaper ran an article with a banner headline paying tribute to his accomplishments. In part, it noted:

"Walter J. 'Wally' Weber, former football star at the University of Michigan, today ends his successful and brilliant four year term as head coach of the Benton Harbor football team. . . . Weber passes from Benton Harbor but his shouts of 'Run, Run, Run,' will always ring in the ears of his players and followers at Filstrup field. Wally came to Benton Harbor as a rookie coach, but leaves today as one of the greatest in the brilliant history of the gridiron sport at the local high school. . . . Since coming here four years ago, Weber gave Benton Harbor its first state championship in 26 years . . . Weber is passing from Benton Harbor in body, but his loyal and winning spirit will never be forgotten here."

Another article noted: "Benton Harbor probably never has boasted a coach as popular as Coach Weber, who has really put Benton Harbor on the football map." On being invited to a reunion of his players in 1959, Weber recalled fondly his days as a high school football coach: "Your fine invitation to break bread with the athletes of yesteryear at Benton Harbor has fallen upon the ears of a grateful coach. Without some of those magnificent boys of '27-28-29-30 my life might have been entirely different. Those boys by their valiant deeds on the gridiron at Filstrup field encouraged me to take up coaching as a lifetime career."

== Football coach and raconteur at Michigan ==
In 1931, Weber accepted a position as an assistant coach at Michigan and continued in that position for 28 years. Hercules Renda, a Michigan fullback in the late 1930s, said: “Wally Weber was the ideal freshman coach. He would call you by the place you were from, and the state you were from. Can you imagine? Think of the memory that man had? He would also use those big words. That was Wally. You were perfectly at ease with him at any time."

When Weber stepped down as an assistant coach in 1958, he became a full-time recruiter for Michigan. At the time, a Michigan sports columnist wrote of Weber: "For 23 years Wally has blown the whistle on freshman football players. . . . The polysyllabic Weber is Michigan's foremost representative on the banquet circuit. In fact, he's about the only one of the staff to get out and stump the state . . ." His official position was public relations, which one paper said "in blunt terms means recruiting chief."

In the 1950s and 1960s, Weber was a popular banquet speaker renowned for his "polysyllabic fluency," "mind--boggling after-dinner speeches," and his often humorous talks about the history of Michigan football. It was noted that he would "regale with dubious rhetoric" audiences before whom he would thunderously and whimsically "expatiate upon" Michigan's storied history. Another described Weber's unusual speaking style this way: "He still sounds like an educated foghorn, and still flips that king's English around in a manner to amaze and apall old Noah Webster." Praising a piledriver spotted among a current crop of Wolverines, the coach would exclaim, "When he hits 'em, generations yet unborn feel the shock of the impact!" Jim Brandstatter wrote in his book Tales from Michigan Stadium that Weber was still a regular visitor at the football offices when he enrolled in 1968. He recalled Weber as a master story teller and a favorite among the students at pep rallies: “Who can forget Wally Weber rolling his pant legs up to his knees as the student body roared before he spoke so eloquently about his beloved Michigan?” Weber also held positions in the 1960s and early 1970s in alumni relations and the physical education department. Weber also provided color commentary on WPAG radio's broadcasts of Michigan football games with Bob Ufer for several years. He retired in 1972 at the same time as Oosterbaan. With the exception of four years at Benton Harbor, Weber had been a student or employee of U-M for 48 years at the time of his retirement.

== Family and later years ==
Weber was married to Frances L. Enders of Benton Harbor. His wife died before him in July 1965. They had a son, Robert Weber, who was a football coach at Kimball High School in Royal Oak, Michigan.

Weber was inducted into the University of Michigan Athletic Hall of Honor in 1981 as part of the fourth group of inductees. Only seven football players were inducted into the Hall of Honor before Weber. Weber was still living in 1981 at the time of his induction into the Hall of Honor.
