= 1932 Chicago Maroons football team =

American college football season

1932 Chicago Maroons football
- Conference: Big Ten Conference
- Record: 3–4–1 (1–4 Big Ten)
- Head coach: Amos Alonzo Stagg (41st season)
- Home stadium: Stagg Field

1932 Big Ten Conference football standings
	Conf.					Overall
Team	W		L		T	W		L		T
No. 1 Michigan +	6	–	0	–	0	8	–	0	–	0
No. 4 Purdue +	5	–	0	–	1	7	–	0	–	1
No. 11 Wisconsin	4	–	1	–	1	6	–	1	–	1
No. 6 Ohio State	2	–	1	–	2	4	–	1	–	3
Northwestern	2	–	3	–	1	3	–	4	–	1
Minnesota	2	–	3	–	0	5	–	3	–	0
Illinois	2	–	4	–	0	5	–	4	–	0
Indiana	1	–	4	–	1	3	–	4	–	1
Chicago	1	–	4	–	0	3	–	4	–	1
Iowa	0	–	5	–	0	1	–	7	–	0
+ – Conference co-champions; Rankings from Dickinson System

The 1932 Chicago Maroons football team was an American football team that represented the University of Chicago during the 1932 Big Ten Conference football season In their 41st and final season under head coach Amos Alonzo Stagg, the Maroons compiled a 3–4–1 record, finished in ninth place in the Big Ten Conference, and outscored their opponents by a combined total of 95 to 94.

== Schedule ==
Date	Opponent	Site	Result	Attendance	Source
September 24	Monmouth (IL) *	Stagg Field; Chicago, IL	W 41–0	15,000	
October 8	at Yale *	Yale Bowl; New Haven, CT	T 7–7	25,000	
October 15	Knox (IL)*	Stagg Field; Chicago, IL	W 20–0	25,000	
October 22	Indiana	Stagg Field; Chicago, IL	W 13–7	22,000	
October 29	Illinois	Stagg Field; Chicago, IL	L 7–13	16,139	
November 5	Purdue	Stagg Field; Chicago, IL (rivalry)	L 0–37	18,000	
November 12	at Michigan	Michigan Stadium; Ann Arbor, MI (rivalry)	L 0–12	34,000	
November 19	Wisconsin	Stagg Field; Chicago, IL	L 7–18	20,000	
*Non-conference game
