= Ted Petoskey =

American baseball player (1911–1996)

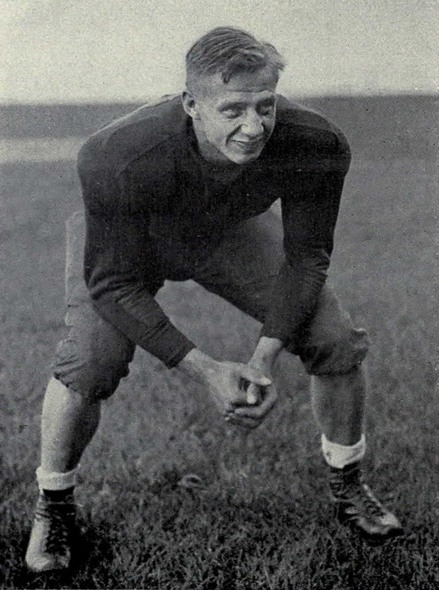
- Petoskey from 1933 Michiganensian

Biographical details
- Born: January 5, 1911; St. Charles, Michigan, U.S.
- Died: November 30, 1996 (aged 85); Elgin, South Carolina, U.S.

Playing career

Football
- 1931–1932: Michigan

Basketball
- 1931–1934: Michigan

Baseball
- 1932–1934: Michigan
- 1934–1935: Cincinnati Reds
- Positions: End (football); Guard (basketball); Outfielder (baseball)

Coaching career (HC unless noted)

Football
- 1942–1946: Wofford

Basketball
- 1935–1940: South Carolina
- 1942–1946: Wofford

Baseball
- 1940–1942: South Carolina
- 1944: Birmingham Barons
- 1945–1947: Wofford
- 1948–1956: South Carolina

Head coaching record
- Overall: 3–13 (college football); 58–91 (college basketball); 133–145–1 (college baseball)

Accomplishments and honors

Championships
- National (1933)

Awards
- 2× First-team All-American (1932, 1933); First-team All-Big Ten (1933); 2× Second-team All-Big Ten (1931, 1932)

Frederick Lee "Ted" Petoskey (January 5, 1911 – November 30, 1996) was a three-sport athlete at the University of Michigan, a Major League Baseball player, a collegiate coach in three sports and an athletic director.

At the University of Michigan, Petoskey received eight varsity letters in three sports. In American football, he was a two-time All-American end for the undefeated Michigan Wolverines football teams that won back-to-back college football national championships in 1932 and 1933. He was also a guard and captain of Michigan's basketball team in the 1933–34 season. As a baseball player in 1934, Petoskey led the Big Ten Conference with a .452 batting average.

Petoskey played parts of the 1934 and 1935 Major League Baseball seasons as an outfielder for the Cincinnati Reds and played minor league baseball until 1944. Petoskey also served in a variety of collegiate coaching positions, including head coach of the University of South Carolina's basketball team (1935–1940), athletic director and football coach at Wofford College, and head baseball coach at the University of South Carolina (1940–42, 1948–56).

== High school athlete ==
Petoskey was raised in St. Charles, Michigan and attended nearby Saginaw Eastern High School. On October 22, 1926, Petoskey became the first receiver in Michigan High School Athletic Association history to garner five receiving touchdowns in a high school football game. As of August 2002, the record had not been surpassed.

While playing for Saginaw, Petoskey was an all-state end two years and an all-state fullback another. He once played in a game with University of Michigan head coach Fielding H. Yost in the stands. Petoskey ran back the opening kickoff for 87 yards and a touchdown and, after hearing that Yost was in the stands, ran back another kickoff in the second half for 92 yards and a touchdown.

== University of Michigan athlete ==
Petoskey was a three-sport player for the Michigan Wolverines. While enrolled at Michigan, he earned eight varsity letters—three in football, three in baseball and two in basketball.

=== 1931 and 1932 football seasons ===
In Petoskey's three years as a varsity football player, the Wolverines had a combined record of 23–1–2 and won two national championships. As a sophomore in 1931, Petoskey was touted as "a second Bennie Oosterbaan," and earned a spot on the United Press All-Big Ten Conference second team.

In his junior year, Petoskey was one of the favorite pass receivers for quarterback Harry Newman, who won the Douglas Fairbanks trophy as the Most Valuable Player in college football. Coach Harry Kipke shifted Petoskey to fullback midway through the 1932 season, and he scored two touchdowns in a 32–0 win over Illinois. The United Press noted: "A running attack which featured Ted Petoskey, converted from an end to a fullback in the last week by Coach Harry Kipke dovetailed nicely with the Wolverine aerial play to produce the touchdowns. With Petoskey plunging the line and sweeping inside the ends for many sizeable gains, the Michigan eleven showed power through the line for the first time this season." An Associated Press writer warned opponents to watch out for Petoskey: "It is about time for grid foeman to wake up when Ted Petoskey, end and fullback on the University of Michigan football team, gets to dreaming. Petoskey's dreams have a habit of coming true, and happily for Petoskey, most of his dreams are good ones."

Petoskey was selected as a first-team All-American in 1932 by the All-American Football Board, a second-team All-American by the New York Sun, and a third-team All-American by the United Press. After the 1932 team compiled a perfect 8–0 record (outscoring opponents 123–13) and won the national championship, the press credited the squad's "esprit de corps" as a key to their success. As an example of Wolverine teamwork, a United Press story pointed to a fumble in the Minnesota game. "Michigan recovered, with both Ted Petoskey, end, and Charles Bernard, center, at the bottom of the heap. Bernard credited Petoskey. Petoskey said Bernard recovered."

=== 1933 football season ===
During his senior year, Petoskey started all eight games at left end for the 1933 Michigan Wolverines football team, as Michigan won its second consecutive national championship, and Petoskey was again named an All-American. Although Petoskey was principally an end, Coach Kipke played Petoskey at fullback in some games in 1933. An October 1933 newspaper story reported on his versatility: "Ted Petoskey, Michigan's brilliant right end was moved into the backfield for last night's practice ... This is the second time Petoskey has figured in such a shift. Last fall he was converted into a fullback before the Illinois game and proved a capable ground gainer. Monday he was given a trial as a forward passer, and made an impressive showing." In his final game for the Michigan football team, Petoskey also kicked a 35-yard field goal against Northwestern, representing the final points scored for Michigan in its 1933 championship season.

After the 1933 season, Petoskey was chosen as a first-team All-American in the Central Press Association poll of team captains, and for the second-team by Grantland Rice. Petoskey also finished third in the voting for the Associated Press 1933 Big Ten Athlete of the Year award. In choosing Petoskey for his All-American team, football writer Lawrence Perry said: "Ted Petoskey of Michigan is one of the finest ends who ever played the game. A former halfback, he is superb as an end-around runner. He receives forward passes with great accuracy and when he catches the ball he is difficult to bring down."

Coach Kipke credited the play of halfback, Herman Everhardus, and his ends for the undefeated season: "Our ends, Ward and Petoskey, were near perfection." The 1934 University of Michigan yearbook, called the Michiganensian, described Petoskey's contributions as follows: "After three years of Varsity football, Petoskey is recognized as one of Michigan's greatest all-time ends. At the end of his junior year, he was chosen All American, and recognized as one of the greatest defense players in the country. He was alert, followed every play, and opponents found it almost impossible to gain around his end." In 1955, Kipke rated Petoskey as one of the six best players he ever coached: "If I had to name the best player I ever coached, it would have to be among Harry Newman, Francis Wistert, Otto Pommerening, Ted Petoskey and Maynard Morrison."

When the Associated Press picked Petoskey as only a second-team All-American in 1933, ten-year-old Mary Lee Grossman from Saginaw, Michigan protested in a letter to AP sports editor, Alan Gould, that he had "chosen wrong" in leaving Petoskey and Whitey Wistert off the first-team. To avoid any appearance of bias, the Saginaw native noted: "You may think I am a friend of these boys but I do not know either of them. I hope you change your mind." Gould responded to Miss Grossman in his column: "You may be right, Mary Lee, but it's too late now to change our mind."

=== Other sports ===
Petoskey was also the captain of the 1933–34 Wolverines basketball team. For the versatile Petoskey, baseball was his best sport. In May 1933, the Wolverines baseball team swept the Ohio State Buckeyes, as All-American football players Whitey Wistert pitched a complete game, and Petoskey hit an inside-the-park home run. Petoskey led the Big Ten Conference in batting in 1934, with 19 hits in 42 at bats for a .452 batting average.

== Professional baseball ==
Ted Petoskey
- Outfielder
- Batted: Right Threw: Right

MLB debut
- September 9, 1934, for the Cincinnati Reds

Last MLB appearance
- June 20, 1935, for the Cincinnati Reds

MLB statistics
- Batting average: .167
- Home runs: 0
- Runs batted in: 1
- Stats at Baseball Reference

Teams
- Cincinnati Reds (1934–1935)

Career highlights and awards
- Big Ten batting average champion (1934)

Immediately after graduating, Petoskey and Michigan teammate Whitey Wistert both signed with the Cincinnati Reds, reporting to the team in early June 1934. Petoskey made his major league debut on September 9, 1934, and Wistert made his debut two days later. Petoskey played in six games in 1934, where he went hitless and struck out five times in seven at bats. On the last day of the 1934 regular season, Petoskey was a strikeout victim of Dizzy Dean in the ninth inning of Dean's 30th win of the year. When the baseball season ended, Petoskey and Wistert both returned to Ann Arbor, Michigan in early October, where they were given coaching assignments helping Ray Fisher teach fundamentals and offering personal tutoring to the freshman football team.

Petoskey returned to the Reds in 1935, but after spring training he was assigned to the minor leagues. He played for the Wilmington Pirates in the Piedmont League for most of the 1935 season, where he was hitting .426 to lead the league in early June. The Reds called up Petoskey in June, and one newspaper noted that when he was called up, Petoskey was "batting above the .400 mark, leading the (Piedmont) league in home runs, runs driven in and practically everything else." He was two-for-five with a stolen base and a .400 batting average in four games for the 1935 Reds, but he played his last game for the Reds on June 20, 1935.

Petoskey played for the Durham Bulls in the Piedmont League in 1936, where he was hitting .428 in late May. He played for the Toronto Maple Leafs in 1937, where he was leading the International League in base hits in mid-June. He continued to play with the Leafs in 1938 and 1939, before being sold to the Toledo Mud Hens in July 1939. He was released by Toledo in March 1940.

== Coaching career ==
=== Basketball coach at South Carolina ===
During the off-season from his summer job as a minor league baseball player, Petoskey coached the University of South Carolina basketball team from 1935 to 1940. In five seasons as the Gamecocks' head coach, the team had a record of 36–67.

=== South Carolina and Wofford (1940–47) ===
Until 1940, Petoskey had been coaching in the offseason, while still playing baseball in the summers. In August 1940, he announced his retirement as a player to take a full-time position as the head baseball coach at South Carolina, a position he held from 1940 to 1942.

In August 1942, Petoskey was hired by Wofford College as its head football coach and director of physical education. At the time, Petoskey had been playing for the Columbia Reds in the Sally League. Petoskey remained at Wofford through 1947, taking time off at times to revive his baseball career. In 1944, Petoskey was a player and manager for the Birmingham Barons of the Southern Association in 1944. In 1945, he left Wofford for the summer to play for the Buffalo Bisons in the International League. He returned to Wofford after World War II. Wofford had suspended its football and basketball programs in 1943 and 1944, but Petoskey announced that the school would bring both programs back in the 1945–46 school year. He also served as coach of the Wofford football team.

=== Baseball coach at South Carolina (1948–56) ===
In 1948, Petoskey returned to the University of South Carolina where he was the head coach of the baseball team until 1956. He also served as an ends coach for the South Carolina football team. In twelve seasons as South Carolina's head baseball coach, Petoskey compiled a record of 113–120. Petoskey's baseball players remembered his love of playing poker and his bringing the team home hungry after a tough loss to Duke. In what team members remembered as the "hunger game," an angry Coach Petoskey told the players to "get on the bus," and the team rode from Durham, North Carolina to Columbia, South Carolina (236 miles) without having eaten. Another time against Furman University, the Gamecocks blew an 11–2 lead in the 8th inning to lose 12–11. On the bus, Petoskey had "that look," and the driver figured the team would receive a tongue-lashing. "He said, 'I don't want to hear a word out of you guys, and that goes for you, too, Bussie.'"

== Later years ==
In December 1956, Petoskey announced he was leaving the University of South Carolina to work for the New York Yankees, as a baseball scout for the Georgia, North Carolina, South Carolina and eastern Tennessee territory. As a Yankees' scout, he signed Duke catcher Steve Crihfield to a contract. And in 1959, when the Yankees moved spring training for their farm system to Columbia, South Carolina, Petoskey was responsible for the logistics and preparing Capital City Park. He served in the mid-1960s as the director of recreation for the South Carolina Department of Corrections. Petoskey died in Elgin, South Carolina at age 85 in 1996.

His son Ted Petoskey, Jr., followed his father playing end in American football. Ted, Jr., was chosen to play end for the South Carolina high school team in the 1959 Shrine Bowl against the North Carolina team, and was named South Carolina high school AAA Lineman of the Year. He went on to play end for the Clemson Tigers football team from 1962 to 1964.

== Head coaching record ==
=== College football ===
Year	Team	Overall	Conference	Standing	Bowl/playoffs
Wofford Terriers (Independent) (1942–1945)
1942	Wofford	2–5			
1943	No team—World War II				
1944	No team—World War II				
1945	No team—World War II				
Wofford Terriers (South Carolina Little Four) (1946)
1946	Wofford	1–8	1–2		
Wofford:		3–13	1–2		
Total:		3–13			

=== College basketball ===
Record table
Season	Team	Overall	Conference	Standing	Postseason
South Carolina Gamecocks (Southern Conference) (1935–1940)
1935–36	South Carolina	11–8	1–6	8th	
1936–37	South Carolina	13–7	7–4	6tj	
1937–38	South Carolina	3–21	2–12	14th	
1938–39	South Carolina	5–18	2–8	13th	
1939–40	South Carolina	5–13	3–10	13th	
South Carolina:		37–67	15–40		
Wofford Terriers () (1942–1946)
1942–43	Wofford	9–5			
1943–44	No team—World War II				
1944–45	Wofford	4–9			
1945–46	Wofford	8–10			
Wofford:		21–24			
Total:		58–91			

=== College baseball ===
Record table
Season	Team	Overall	Conference	Standing	Postseason
South Carolina Gamecocks (1940–1942)
1940	South Carolina	8–9			
1941	South Carolina	10–8			
1942	South Carolina	6–11			
Wofford Terriers (1945–1947)
1945	Wofford	2–10			
1946	Wofford	8–7			
1947	Wofford	10–8			
Wofford:		20–25			
South Carolina Gamecocks (1948–1956)
1948	South Carolina	6–14			
1949	South Carolina	15–6			
1950	South Carolina	16–9–1			
1951	South Carolina	6–15			
1952	South Carolina	9–8			
1953	South Carolina	8–11			
1954	South Carolina	10–10			
1955	South Carolina	10–10			
1956	South Carolina	9–9			
South Carolina:		113–120–1			
Total:		133–145–1			
National champion Postseason invitational champion Conference regular season champion Conference regular season and conference tournament champion Division regular season champion Division regular season and conference tournament champion Conference tournament champion

== See also ==
- 1932 Michigan Wolverines football team
- 1933 Michigan Wolverines football team
- List of Michigan Wolverines football All-Americans
- Cincinnati Reds all-time roster
