= Whitey Wistert =

American football and baseball player (1912–1985)

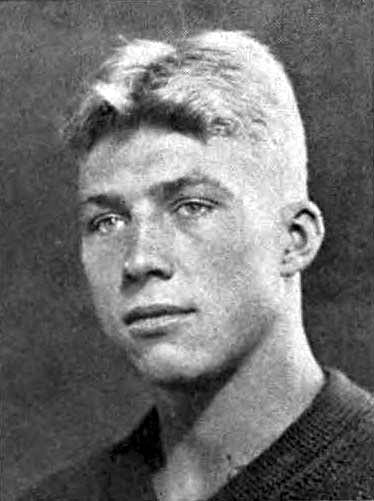

No. 11
- Position: Tackle

Personal information
- Born: February 20, 1912; Chicago, Illinois, U.S.
- Died: April 23, 1985 (aged 73); Painesville, Ohio, U.S.
- Listed height: 6 ft 2 in (1.88 m)
- Listed weight: 210 lb (95 kg)

Career information
- High school: Schurz (Chicago, Illinois)
- College: Michigan (1931–1933)

Awards and highlights
- 2× National champion (1932, 1933); Consensus All-American (1933); First-team All-Big Ten (1933); Second-team All-Big Ten (1932); Michigan Wolverines No. 11 retired
- College Football Hall of Fame (Class of 1967)

Other information
- Baseball career
- Pitcher
- Batted: Right Threw: Right

MLB debut
- September 11, 1934, for the Cincinnati Reds

Last MLB appearance
- September 25, 1934, for the Cincinnati Reds

MLB statistics
- Win–loss record: 0–1
- Earned run average: 1.13
- Strikeouts: 1
- Stats at Baseball Reference

Teams
- Cincinnati Reds (1934)

Career highlights and awards
- Big Ten Most Valuable Player (1934)

Francis Michael "Whitey" Wistert (February 20, 1912 – April 23, 1985) was an American football and baseball player. He played college football and college baseball at the University of Michigan. Wistert was the first of the three Wistert brothers—he was succeeded by Albert and Alvin—who were named All-American tackles at Michigan and later inducted into the College Football Hall of Fame. He was elected to the College Football Hall of Fame in 1967.

During his time at Michigan, Wistert played on three consecutive Big Ten Conference football championships teams, including two that won back-to-back national championships. He was also Big Ten Conference MVP in baseball in college and later played for the Cincinnati Reds of the Major League Baseball. The Wistert brothers all wore jersey No. 11 at Michigan and are among the seven players who have had their numbers retired by the Michigan Wolverines football program. Their number was temporarily put back into circulation starting on November 10, 2012, before a Michigan home game against the Northwestern Wildcats as part of the Michigan Football Legend program. The Legends program was discontinued in July 2015, and the numbers again permanently retired.

== Early life ==
Wistert was born in 1912 in Chicago. His parents, Kazimir J. Wistert and Josephine (Shukis) Wistert, immigrated to the United States from Lithuania in 1894 and were married at Chicago in 1907. His father was a policeman in Chicago from at least 1910 to 1927. At the time of the 1920 United States census, Wistert's family lived at 5647 Waveland Avenue in Chicago's 27th Ward and consisted of parents, Kazimir and Josephine, and five children: Josephine (age 11), Isabelle (age 10), Francis (age 7), Evelyn (age 6), and Alvin (age 31/2).

Wistert's father was shot while on duty and pursuing a robbery suspect in July 1926. By the spring of 1927, Wistert's father, who had served in the U.S. Army from 1898 to 1901, was disabled due to "chest emphysema with draining sinus" and was admitted to the U.S. National Home for Disabled Volunteer Soldiers in Milwaukee, Wisconsin. He died in June 1927 when Whitey was 15 years old.

At the time of the 1930 United States census, Wistert's family continued to live at 5647 Waveland Avenue in Chicago. The household at that time consisted of Wistert's mother, Josephine, and five children: Josephine (age 22, employed as a bookkeeper), Francis (age 18, employed as a tube maker for a radio company), Evelyn (age 16, employed as a "saleslady" at a variety store), Alvin (age 13), and Albert (age 8).

== College athletics ==
After graduating from Chicago's Schurz High School in 1929, Wistert attended the University of Michigan where he was a star athlete in both football and baseball from 1931 to 1933.

=== The Wistert brothers of Michigan ===
Wistert was the first of three brothers to play for Michigan. The other two are Al Wistert and Alvin Wistert. All three Wistert brothers wore number 11 for the Wolverines football team, and all three were All-Americans. Interviewed by The Detroit News in 2004, Alvin recalled: "And if I'm not mistaken I think this is unprecedented in the annals of college football: that three brothers all would go to the same school, all played football. All played tackle, all wore the same number 11, all made All-American. Two of us played on four national championship teams. And all were inducted into the College Football Hall of Fame."

The Wistert brothers grew up on the northwest side of Chicago and were the sons of a Lithuanian family. Their father was a Spanish–American War veteran who was later killed in the line of duty while working for the Chicago Police Department. According to brother Alvin Wistert, their father "was born Casmir Vistertus and he Anglicized it when he came to America to Wistert."

The story of the Wistert brothers at Michigan began when Whitey's Carl Schurz High School classmate John Kowalik was invited to visit the University of Michigan. At the time, Whitey Wistert "was working in a factory building Majestic radios." Kowalik took Whitey with him on his visit to Ann Arbor, and according to Alvin, "that's how it started: the Wisterts of Michigan."

=== Football ===
As a football player, Wistert played for consecutive undefeated national championship teams in 1932 and 1933 and was a consensus All-American in 1933. The 1934 University of Michigan yearbook, the Michiganensian, included the following quote from Grantland Rice: "Wistert was unanimously selected as the best tackle in the Middle-West this year. He was the key to Michigan's defensive line play. He was a sure tackler and it was next to impossible to fool him on trick maneuvers. He was keen, quick, and accurate in diagnosing plays."

Wistert and Chuck Bernard were the leaders of the 1933 offensive line when the team went 7–0–1 with a tie to the Minnesota Golden Gophers.

One of Wistert's teammates on the 1932 and 1933 Michigan football teams was future U.S. President Gerald Ford. In an interview in the February 1974 issue of "Michigan Alumnus", Wistert said of Ford: "He was a real good competitor – a real bulldog type. Even during a losing year, he was voted MVP by his teammates. They felt he was one guy who could stay and fight for a losing cause."

In 1936, he was a member Michigan football coaching staff under Coach Harry Kipke.

=== Baseball ===
Wistert also earned varsity letters in baseball three years and was selected as the Most Valuable Player in the Big Ten Conference in 1934. The 1934 Michiganensian yearbook reports that the final game of the baseball season was a 4–0 shutout by Wistert against the University of Chicago Maroons. "Wistert, for the Wolves, allowed only five well-scattered hits during the game. Although Whitey Wistert walked four men, he more than off-set this by striking out nine of the Maroons to face him." Wistert also pitched a four-hitter against Ohio State.

=== Honors ===
Wistert was inducted into the College Football Hall of Fame in 1967, one year before his brother Albert. In 1981, he was named to the University of Michigan Hall of Honor in the fourth class of inductees alongside his brothers. Only five Michigan football players earned this honor before him.

== Professional baseball ==
Wistert had a short cup of coffee in Major League Baseball, appearing in three games for the Cincinnati Reds between September 11, 1934, and September 25, 1934. In two appearances as a pitcher, Wistert allowed only one run in eight innings, for a career ERA of 1.13. The only career earned run he ever allowed came off the bat of a 17-year old phenom who was also a Chicago Public Schools alum in Phil Cavarretta of his hometown Chicago Cubs, who hit his first career home run in the 2nd inning of a 1–0 Reds loss. In three plate appearances, he went hitless and struck out twice. Although he only played briefly at the major league level, Wistert played five years of professional baseball. Fellow 1933 Michigan Wolverines football All-American, Ted Petoskey also debuted for the Reds in September 1934.

== Late life ==
After retiring from sports, Wistert became a New York lawyer. He went on to become a vice-president of an industrial relations firm in Toledo, Ohio. He served in the United States Navy as a lieutenant during World War II.

== See also ==
- 1932 Michigan Wolverines football team
- 1933 Michigan Wolverines football team
- List of Michigan Wolverines football All-Americans
- University of Michigan Athletic Hall of Honor
