= John Letsinger =

American football player (1911–2002)

- Letsinger with the Pittsburgh Pirates in 1933

No. 31
- Position: Guard

Personal information
- Born: November 17, 1911; Bloomfield, Indiana, U.S.
- Died: January 31, 2002 (aged 90); Bloomington, Indiana, U.S.
- Listed height: 5 ft 10 in (1.78 m)
- Listed weight: 190 lb (86 kg)

Career information
- High school: Bloomfield (Indiana)
- College: Purdue

Career history
- Pittsburgh Pirates (1933)

Awards and highlights
- Second-team All-Big Ten (1932)
- Stats at Pro Football Reference

John Howard Letsinger (November 17, 1911 – January 31, 2002) was an American professional football center who played one season with the Pittsburgh Pirates of the National Football League (NFL). He played college football at Purdue University.

== Early life and college ==
Letsinger was born on November 17, 1911, in Bloomfield, Indiana. He attended Bloomfield High School in Bloomfield, Indiana.

Letsinger played for the Purdue Boilermakers from 1931 to 1932, earning Associated Press second-team All-Big Ten honors in 1932.

== Professional career ==
Letsinger signed with the Pittsburgh Pirates of the National Football League in 1933. He played in one game, a start, for the Pirates during the team's inaugural 1933 season. He was released on October 10, 1933.

== Personal life ==
Letsinger died on January 31, 2002, in Bloomington, Indiana.
