= Kenneth Fairman =

American sportsman and politician (1912–1994)

Biographical details
- Born: February 23, 1912; Spring Valley, New York, U.S.
- Died: March 8, 1994 (aged 82); Princeton, New Jersey, U.S.

Playing career

Football
- 1931–1933: Princeton
- Position: End (football)

Coaching career (HC unless noted)

Basketball
- 1935–1938: Princeton

Administrative career (AD unless noted)
- 1941–1942: Princeton
- 1944–1972: Princeton

Head coaching record
- Overall: 25–38

Roy Kenneth Fairman (February 23, 1912 – March 8, 1994) was an American college sportsman, basketball coach, athletics administrator, and local politician. He served as the head basketball coach at Princeton University from 1935 to 1938, compiling a record of 25–38. He was the athletic director at Princeton from 1941 to 1972 with a hiatus during World War II, in which he served as a United States Army officer. Fairman was the mayor of Princeton Township, New Jersey from 1959 to 1963.
