= John Oehler =

American football player (1910–1983)

John "Cap" Oehler

No. 26
- Position: Center

Personal information
- Born: August 5, 1910; Queens, New York, U.S.
- Died: 12 May 1983 (aged 72); Pinehurst, North Carolina, U.S.
- Listed height: 6 ft 0 in (1.83 m)
- Listed weight: 204 lb (93 kg)

Career information
- College: Purdue

Career history
- Pittsburgh Pirates (1933–1934); Brooklyn Dodgers (1935–1936)

Awards and highlights
- Third-team All-American (1932); First-team All-Big Ten (1932)

Career statistics
- Games played: 40
- Rushes / yds: 2 / 14
- Safeties: 1
- Stats at Pro Football Reference

John Walter "Cap" Oehler (born August 5, 1910 – May 12, 1983) was an American football center in the National Football League (NFL). He was a charter member of the Pittsburgh Pirates (which would later be renamed the Steelers). Oehler was born in Queens, New York. He played college football at Purdue University where he was named a captain.

In 1933 Oehler joined the newly formed Pittsburgh Pirates of the NFL. In the team's first game, he blocked a punt which went out the back of the end zone resulting in a safety. Those were the first points recorded in franchise history and the lone points in that first 23–2 loss. He would play two years for the Pirates before moving on to the Brooklyn Dodgers where he played two more seasons.

After leaving football, he built a career in sales with shipbuilder Dravo Corporation.
