= Roy Horstmann =

American football player (1910–1998)

Purdue Boilermakers
- Position: Running back

Personal information
- Born: December 6, 1910; Aurora, Illinois, U.S.
- Died: January 23, 1998 (aged 87)

Career information
- College: Purdue

Career history
- 1933: Boston Redskins
- 1934: Chicago Cardinals

Awards and highlights
- First-team All-American (1932); First-team All-Big Ten (1932)

Roy Joseph Horstmann (December 6, 1910 – January 23, 1998) was an American football running back in the National Football League (NFL) for the Boston Redskins and Chicago Cardinals. He played college football at Purdue University. While at Purdue, Horstmann was a brother at Theta Tau fraternity (Roll Number: Phi 097).
