= Paul Moss (American football) =

American football player (1908–1999)

No. 30
- Position: Wide receiver

Personal information
- Born: October 2, 1908; Brazil, Indiana, U.S.
- Died: May 5, 1999 (aged 90); Terre Haute, Indiana, U.S.

Career information
- College: Purdue

Career history
- Pittsburgh Pirates (1933); St. Louis Gunners (1934)

Awards and highlights
- NFL receiving yards leader (1933); Unanimous All-American (1932); First-team All-American (1931); 2× First-team All-Big Ten (1931, 1932); Second-team All-Big Ten (1930)

Career statistics
- Receptions: 19
- Receiving yards: 414
- Receiving touchdowns: 3
- Stats at Pro Football Reference

Paul Moss (October 2, 1908 – May 25, 1999) was an American professional football player who was a wide receiver for two seasons with the Pittsburgh Pirates and the St. Louis Gunners.

An outstanding athlete, he excelled in multiple sports at Terre Haute's Gerstmeyer Tech High School, before becoming a multi-sport athlete for the Purdue Boilermakers. While at Purdue, Moss was twice named All-American (1931, 1932), he was a 2× All-B10 End & a 3-time (1930–32) letterman. He appeared in the 1933 East-West Shrine Game before being drafted by the Pirates of the NFL. He also played baseball for two seasons (1931, 1932).

He appeared in 10 games as a rookie and led the NFL in Receiving Yards (283 yds), he had 13 catches for a 28.3 yd/catch average and scored twice. He spent the 1934 season with the St. Louis Gunners.

After his professional football career ended, he played at least one year (1935) in the Three-I League for his hometown Terre Haute Tots.

He entered the high school coaching ranks in Ohio and Minnesota, achieving a record of 56-19-1 (.743); his 1934 Maplewood (OH) High team won the County title behind future NFL star Paul Christman. He won a conference title at Painesville's (OH) Harvey High

He was inducted into the Indiana Football Hall of Fame in 1976
