= Greg Kabat =

American gridiron football player (1911–1994)

Profile
- Positions: Running back, Guard, Flying wing

Personal information
- Born: May 21, 1911; Wisconsin, U.S.
- Died: January 12, 1994 (aged 82); Malheur County, Oregon, U.S.

Career information
- College: University of Wisconsin

Career history
- 1933–1940: Winnipeg 'Pegs/Blue Bombers
- 1941: Vancouver Grizzlies

Awards and highlights
- 2× Grey Cup champion (1935, 1939); 2× Third-team All-American (1931, 1932); 3× First-team All-Big Ten (1930, 1931, 1932)
- Canadian Football Hall of Fame (Class of 1966)

Gregory Stanley Kabat (May 21, 1911 – January 12, 1994) was an American gridiron football player and coach. He played Canadian football professionally as a running back for eight seasons with the Winnipeg Blue Bombers of the Canadian Football League (NFL). He helped the Blue Bombers win two Grey Cup championships in 1935 and 1939.

He played college football for the University of Wisconsin, where he was named to the 1932 College Football All-America Team as a guard. Kabat was also an All-American thrower for the Wisconsin Badgers track and field team, placing 4th in the discus throw at the 1931 NCAA Track and Field Championships.

Kabat later coached football at Vancouver College, the University of British Columbia, and Cantwell High School in Montebello, California. He was inducted into the Canadian Football Hall of Fame in 1966.

== Coaching career ==
In 1948, Kabat was hired at the head football and head track coach at Cantwell High School in Montebello, California. He resigned as football and track coach in 1966, but remained a member of the teaching faculty at the school.
