= Ted Rosequist =

American football player and coach (1908–1988)

No. 15, 47, 17
- Position: Tackle

Personal information
- Born: April 17, 1908; Emlenton, Pennsylvania, U.S.
- Died: November 29, 1988 (aged 80); West Palm Beach, Florida, U.S.
- Listed height: 6 ft 4 in (1.93 m)
- Listed weight: 222 lb (101 kg)

Career information
- High school: Central (Cleveland, Ohio)
- College: Ohio State

Career history

Playing
- Chicago Bears (1934–1936); Cleveland Rams (1937)

Coaching
- Brooklyn (1948–1953) (head coach)

Awards and highlights
- 2× Third-team All-American (1932, 1933); 2× First-team All-Big Ten (1932, 1933)

Career NFL statistics
- Games: 33
- Receptions: 3
- Receiving yards: 35
- Stats at Pro Football Reference

Theodore Anthony Rosequist (April 17, 1908 – November 29, 1988) was an American football player and coach. Rosequist played college football at John Carroll University and Ohio State University. He was selected by the International News Service as a third-team tackle on the 1932 College Football All-America Team. He played professional football as a tackle in the National Football League (NFL) for the Chicago Bears (1934–1936) and Cleveland Rams (1937).

Rosequist served as the head football coach at Brooklyn College from 1948 to 1953.
