= 1932 All-Big Ten Conference football team =

American college football all-star team

The 1932 All-Big Ten Conference football team consists of American football players selected to the All-Big Ten Conference teams chosen by various selectors for the 1932 Big Ten Conference football season.

== All Big-Ten selections ==
=== Ends ===
- Paul Moss, Purdue (AP-1, UP-1)
- Ivy Williamson, Michigan (AP-1, UP-2)
- Sid Gillman, Ohio State (UP-1)
- Ted Petoskey, Michigan (AP-2, UP-2)
- Bradbury N. Robinson, III, Minnesota (AP-2)

=== Tackles ===
- Marshall Wells, Minnesota (AP-1, UP-1)
- Whitey Wistert, Michigan (AP-2, UP-1)
- Ted Rosequist, Ohio State (AP-1, UP-2)
- Bill Cassels, Chicago (AP-2)
- Dutch Fehring, Purdue (UP-2)

=== Guards ===
- Greg Kabat, Wisconsin (AP-1, UP-1)
- Joseph T. Gailus, Ohio State (AP-1, UP-2)
- John Letsinger, Purdue (AP-2, UP-2)
- Martin D. Varner, Ohio State (AP-2)

=== Centers ===
- Chuck Bernard, Michigan (AP-1, UP-1)
- John Oehler, Purdue (AP-2, UP-1 [guard])
- Parsons, Chicago (UP-2)

=== Quarterbacks ===
- Harry Newman, Michigan (AP-1, UP-1)
- Paul Pardonner, Purdue (AP-2)
- Pug Lund, Minnesota (UP-2) (CFHOF)

=== Halfbacks ===
- Gil Berry, Illinois (AP-1, UP-1)
- Lew Hinchman, Ohio State (AP-1, UP-1)
- Walter "Mickey" McGuire, Wisconsin (AP-2, UP-2)
- Duane Purvis, Purdue (AP-2, UP-2 [fb])
- Fred Hecker, Purdue (UP-2)

=== Fullbacks ===
- Roy Horstmann, Purdue (AP-1, UP-1)
- Jack Manders, Minnesota (AP-2)

== Key ==
AP = Associated Press

UP = United Press

Bold = Consensus first-team selection of the AP and UP

== See also ==
- 1932 College Football All-America Team
