= Harry Newman (American football) =

American football player (1909–2000)

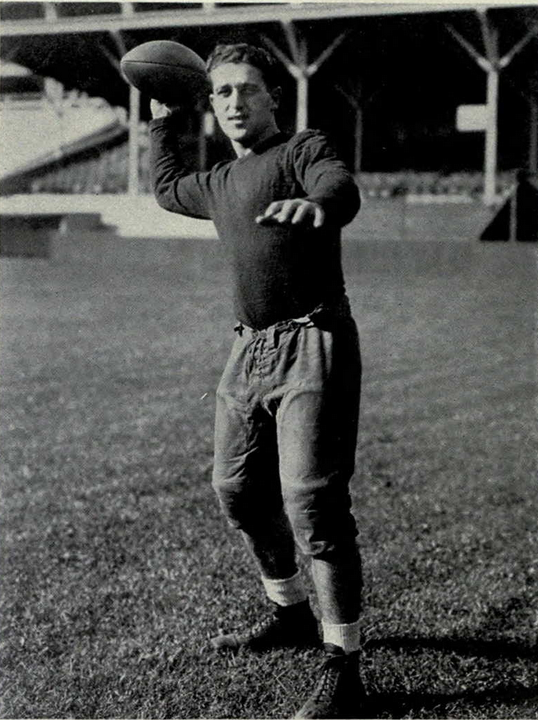
- Newman in 1932

No. 12
- Position: Halfback

Personal information
- Born: September 5, 1909; Detroit, Michigan, U.S.
- Died: May 2, 2000 (aged 90); Las Vegas, Nevada, U.S.
- Listed height: 5 ft 8 in (1.73 m)
- Listed weight: 179 lb (81 kg)

Career information
- High school: Northern (Detroit)
- College: Michigan

Career history
- New York Giants (1933–1935); Brooklyn/Rochester Tigers (1936–1937)

Awards and highlights
- NFL champion (1934); 2× Second-team All-Pro (1933, 1934); NFL passing yards leader (1933); NFL passing touchdowns leader (1933); National champion (1932); Unanimous All-American (1932); Third-team All-American (1930); Chicago Tribune Silver Football (1932); 2× First-team All-Big Ten (1930, 1932); Second-team All-Big Ten (1931)

Career NFL statistics
- Passing attempts: 258
- Passing completions: 97
- Completion percentage: 37.6%
- TD–INT: 12–36
- Passing yards: 1,496
- Passer rating: 33.5
- Rushing yards: 1,086
- Rushing touchdowns: 6
- Stats at Pro Football Reference
- College Football Hall of Fame

Harry Lawrence Newman (September 5, 1909 – May 2, 2000) was an American professional football player who was a quarterback in the National Football League (NFL) and American Football League (AFL). He played college football for the Michigan Wolverines (1930–32), for whom in 1932 he was a unanimous first-team All-American, and the recipient of the Douglas Fairbanks Trophy as Outstanding College Player of the Year (predecessor of the Heisman Trophy), and the Helms Athletic Foundation Player of the Year Award; he was later inducted into the College Football Hall of Fame. He then played professionally for the New York Giants (1933–35), earning All-Pro honors, before joining the Brooklyn/Rochester Tigers (1936–37).

== Early life ==
Newman was born in Detroit, Michigan, and was Jewish. He was a running back at Northern High School, where he also played center field on the baseball team, and then attended a camp where Benny Friedman was the counselor and taught him how to pass a football.

== College career ==
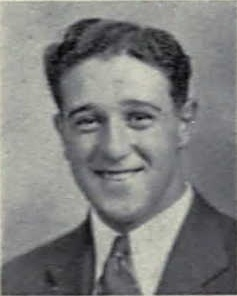
Newman's senior portrait from 1933 Michiganensian

Newman attended the University of Michigan, and played for the Wolverines in football from 1930 to 1932.

In Newman's three years at Michigan, the Wolverines lost only one game, won three Big Ten Conference championship, and had a combined record of 24–1–2. As a senior in 1932, Newman led the team to an undefeated season and national championship, as he played 437 out of 480 minutes of game time in Michigan's eight games. In 1932, Newman was a unanimous first-team All-American, and the recipient of the Douglas Fairbanks Trophy as Outstanding College Player of the Year (predecessor of the Heisman Trophy), and the Helms Athletic Foundation Player of the Year Award, the Chicago Tribune Silver Football trophy as the Most Valuable Player in the Big Ten Conference.

== Professional career ==
=== New York Giants (1933–35) ===
==== 1933 season ====
As a rookie with the New York Giants in 1933, Newman was an All-Pro and led the National Football League (NFL) in passes completed (53), passing yards (973), touchdown passes (11), and longest pass completion (78 yards). Newman's 973 passing yards stood as the NFL single-season record until 1937 when Arnie Herber threw for 1,239 yards. He also led the Giants, and was sixth in the NFL, with 437 yards rushing in 1933. With 1,547 yards of total offense (973 passing, 437 rushing and 137 receiving), Newman personally accounted for more than half of the Giants' total offense in 1933. He was named to the All-Pro team, and led the Giants to the 1933 NFL championship game.

In the 1933 NFL Championship Game against the Chicago Bears, Newman threw a 29-yard touchdown pass to Red Badgro to give the Giants a 7–6 halftime lead. Newman's touchdown throw to Badgro was the first touchdown pass thrown in an NFL championship game. After the Bears went ahead 16–14 in the third quarter, Newman threw a second touchdown pass in the fourth quarter to give the Giants the lead, but the Bears scored the winning touchdown with less than one minute left to win the championship game, 23–21.

==== 1934 season ====
In 1934, Newman was the Giants' leading rusher and passer, and was an All-Pro for the second consecutive season. The Giants went on to win their first NFL championship in 1934, but Newman's season was cut short after he broke two bones in his back during the tenth game of the season against the Chicago Bears. Newman complained after the 1934 season that the new football adopted by the NFL in 1934 was "harder to pass" than the old one which had greater girth. He set the NFL single-game carries record of 38 which was tied in 1966 by Jim Nance and broken in 1973 by O. J. Simpson.

==== 1935 season ====
In early September 1935, there were reports that Newman might not return to the Giants' backfield, because he did not want to leave his Detroit liquor business. Newman announced he was quitting professional football and did not play the first few weeks of the season. Then, on October 15, 1935, Newman announced that he had changed his mind and signed a contract to play with the Giants beginning the following Saturday. After his return, Newman wrote: "Football still is fun. If it weren't it wouldn't be worth while, regardless of how much they paid you for it. Believe me, I've missed it the few weeks I was out and I was mighty glad to get back into action." Newman played in eight games (four as a starter) for a Giants team that once again advanced to the NFL Championship Game, losing to the Detroit Lions, 26–7. With the clock ticking off the final seconds of the championship game, Newman threw an interception that was run back 36 yards and resulted in a final score by the Lions.

In November 1935, Newman wrote a guest column for the New York Post on the difference between the college and professional game. Newman wrote: "Among the Giants we kid a lot about how we feel Monday morning. Sometimes it's not too good. That's when the aches and pains begin to creep up on you. Boys, how you hate to get out of bed! The only difference between pro and amateur in that respect is that you ache all over a day later in pro football."

After the 1935 season, Newman credited his disappointing performance in 1935 to skating: "Skating is the best thing I know of to develop hip-swinging, judgment of distance, suppleness, dexterity, pivot and angle terms. I was off form in 1935 and the main reason was because I did no skating last winter. I did a lot in 1932–33 and followed it up with a great season on the gridiron."

In 1936, Giants president John V. Mara said that the club had paid Newman $10,000 in 1935. Mara said that the owners had found out that it did not work out to pay one star $800 a game while the rest of the team was paid $100 per game, and the resentment sometimes showed. The owners reacted by trying to evenly distribute money over the squad, such that Mara believed that the highest paid player in 1936 was paid only $500 per game.

=== Brooklyn Tigers (1936) ===
In 1936, Newman jumped to the new American Football League (AFL), and signed with the Brooklyn Tigers. Newman reportedly made the move "because he got a contract calling for a big increase in salary." Newman was one of the first established stars to switch to the new league, and sports writer Harry Grayson reported on Newman's move: "Harry Newman, the former Michigan quarterback who has been the highest paid pro athlete of the last three campaigns, has left the Giants flat to perform with and be the business manager of the American League entry which plans to stage its games at the Yankee Stadium."

Even before the new league got started, it was reported to be tottering on the brink and a "big flop." As one report noted: "That in spite of the fact such outstanding players as Ken Strong, Harry Newman and Gomer Jones are slated to compete for the new clubs." On October 19, Newman scored the Tigers' only touchdown in a loss to the Pittsburgh Americans at Forbes Field. On November 1, Newman made a "sensational 45-yard run" that "brought the crowd to its feet" just before the first quarter ended. Newman also kicked a field goal to give the Tigers a 3–0 lead over the New York Yankees, but the Yankees tied it with a field goal. Later in the game, Newman ran 75 yards for what appeared to be the winning touchdown, but the play was called back on a clipping penalty. In response to the penalty call, the crowd at Yankee Stadium "booed lustily." On November 8, Newman lateraled for both of Brooklyn's touchdowns and kicked both extra points in a 15–14 loss to the Cleveland Rams.

=== Rochester Tigers (1936–37) ===
In mid-November 1936, the Tigers franchise, which was co-owned by Newman and Mike Palm, moved to Rochester, New York, where they played the final two games of the 1936 season. In announcing the move, one report focused on Newman as one of the best players in the new league: "Headlining the Rochester cast is Harry Newman, football's greatest passer . . . Newman is the leading ground gainer in the American League, despite the fact that he is with a second division club."

The Rochester Tigers lost to the Rams again in late November by a score of 7–6 on "a snow-swept gridiron." Newman put the Tigers ahead with two 35-yard field goals in the fourth quarter, but the Rams recovered a fumble behind the Tigers' goal line to win the game. The Brooklyn/Rochester Tigers finished the 1936 season in last place in the new league with a record of 0–6–1, and were outscored 82–58.

Newman closed the season on December 20, 1936, playing for the New York Yankees against the Boston Shamrocks. This was an exhibition game, as the league's regular season had ended in November. The Yankees won, 25–19, and Newman "booted a perfect kick from placement on the 30-yard line."

In March 1937, Newman and Palm said they expected to move the franchise out of Rochester unless a minimum of $25,000 in cash subscriptions could be raised. On September 14, 1937, a group of 30 men announced the formation of the Rochester Professional Football Team, Inc. to continue operation of the Rochester Tigers. Newman and Palm were named as the coaches. Newman drew a salary of $250 per game for Rochester in 1937, higher than the professional average of $100, but less than the $425 paid to Sammy Baugh. The Tigers opened with a 16–0 loss to the Boston Shamrocks, followed by a 17–14 win over the Cincinnati Bengals. They followed with a 6–0 win over the Boston Shamrocks, as Newman kicked a field goal in the win. On October 24, 1937, Newman and Bill O'Neill led the Tigers to a 24–0 victory over the New York Yankees, as the Tigers moved into second place with a 3–2 record behind the Los Angeles Bulldogs. In the season's sixth game, Newman led the Tigers to a victory over the Cincinnati Bengals, throwing three passes to account for a touchdown and then kicking the extra point in the final minute and a half. Newman and former Pitt halfback Mike Sebastian were the mainstays of the 1937 Tigers. On November 14, the Tigers played the first place Los Angeles Bulldogs. The Bulldogs took a 35–0 lead before Newman launched a comeback attempt. Newman ran 25 yards for a touchdown and threw two touchdown passes, but the Bulldogs won, 48–21.

After the 1937 season, the American Professional Football League folded, and Newman retired from football.

== Later life ==
Newman later became an executive with Ford Motor Company and owned Ford dealerships in Detroit and Denver. He later lived in Palm Aire in Pompano Beach, Florida, and ultimately in Las Vegas, Nevada, where he died in May 2000 at the age of 90.

== Honors and accolades ==
Newman received numerous honors and accolades, including the following:

- Recipient of the Chicago Tribune Silver Football as the Most Valuable Player in the Big Ten Conference in 1932.
- Unanimous choice as an All-American in 1932.
- Douglas Fairbanks Trophy as Outstanding College Player of the Year (predecessor of the Heisman Trophy), 1932.
- Helms Athletic Foundation Player of the Year Award, 1932 and 1933.
- Inducted into the College Football Hall of Fame in 1975.
- Inducted into the University of Michigan Hall of Honor in 1983.
- Inducted into the Michigan Jewish Sports Hall of Fame in 1985.
- Inducted into the International Jewish Sports Hall of Fame in 1992.
- Selected in 2005 as one of the 100 greatest Michigan football players of all time by the "Motown Sports Revival," ranking 12th on the all-time team.

== See also ==
- List of Michigan Wolverines football All-Americans
- History of the New York Giants (1925–1978)
- University of Michigan Athletic Hall of Honor
