= Chuck Bernard =

American football player (1911–1962)

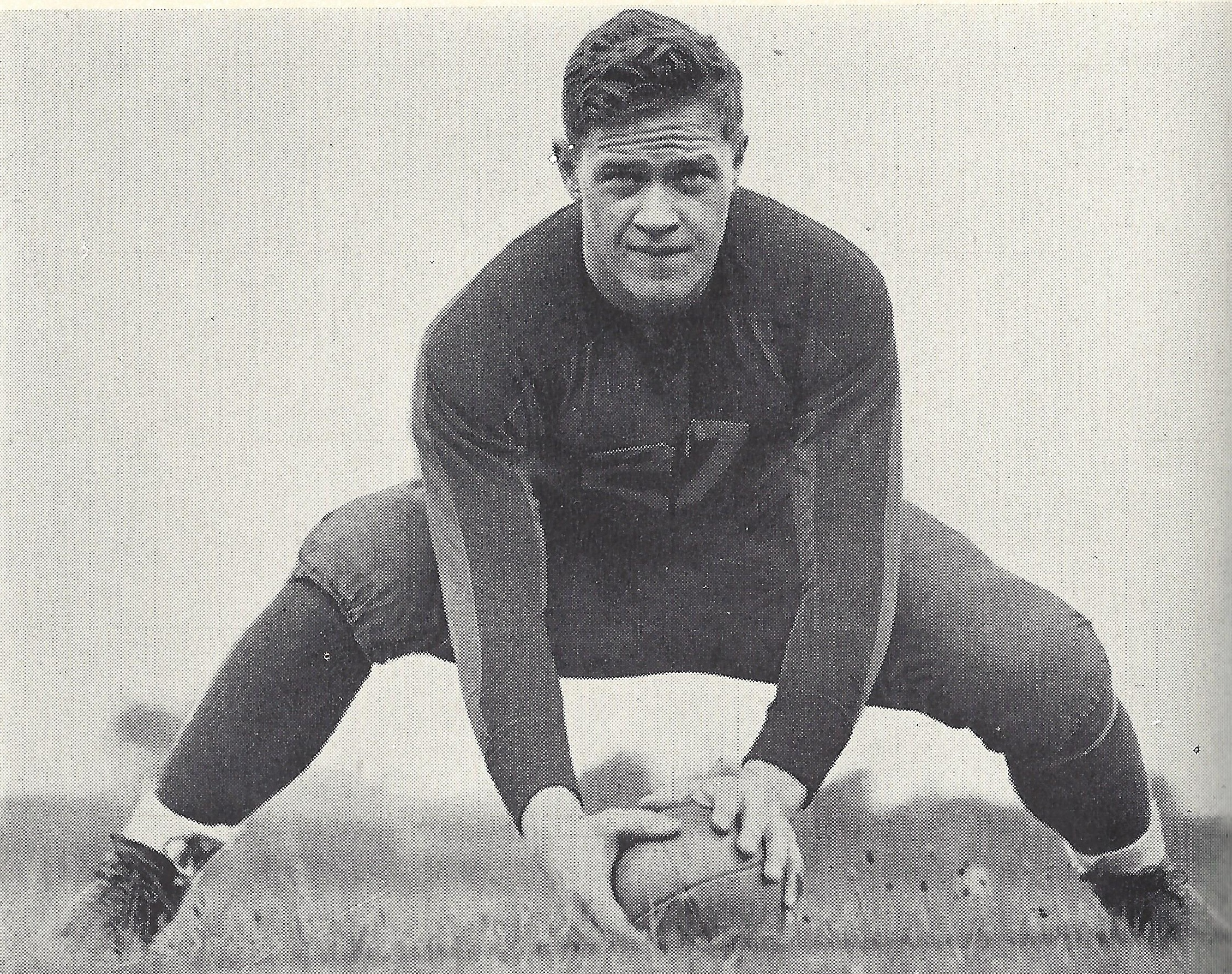
- Chuck Bernard from 1934 Michiganensian

No. 27
- Position: Center

Personal information
- Born: August 29, 1911; Chicago, U.S.
- Died: March 1962 (aged 50); Detroit, Michigan, U.S.
- Listed height: 6 ft 3 in (1.91 m)
- Listed weight: 225 lb (102 kg)

Career information
- High school: Benton Harbor
- College: Michigan

Career history
- Detroit Lions (1934)

Awards and highlights
- National champion (1933); Unanimous All-American (1933); First-team All-American (1932); 2× First-team All-Big Ten (1932, 1933)
- Stats at Pro Football Reference

Joseph Charles Bernard (August 29, 1911 – March 1962) was an American football player. He played college football for the Michigan Wolverines from 1931 to 1933 teams and was the starting center on the 1932 and 1933 teams that compiled a combined record of 15–0–1. Bernard was selected as consensus first-team All-American in 1933. He later played one year of professional football for the Detroit Lions in 1934.

== Early life ==
Bernard was born in Chicago in 1911. He attended Benton Harbor High School in Benton Harbor, Michigan. In 1928 and 1929, Bernard was named the Michigan outstanding prep athlete.

== University of Michigan ==
Bernard was a 60-minute player who was said to be equally brilliant on offense and defense. Bernard was an All-American center on the Wolverines back-to-back undefeated national championship teams in 1932 and 1933. The 1932 team went 8–0 (including six shutouts) and outscored opponents 123 to 13, an average of 1.6 points per game by U-M's opponents. The 1933 team went 7–0–1, outscored its opponents, 131 to 18, and its only blemish was a scoreless tie against the University of Minnesota Golden Gophers in the Little Brown Jug game.

In an article in Collier's magazine, famed sports writer Grantland Rice said of Bernard: "His height, weight and physical power combined with a keen football intelligence, made him an ideal man backing up the line. He was quick at diagnosing plays and went to the right spot. He was one of football's best defenders against the forward pass and adept at intercepting passes."

Bernard was a consensus first-team All-American, being selected by Walter Camp and Associated Press, among others. In a January 1934 article announcing the All-American selections, Time magazine noted: "Michigan's Bernard, a 215-lb. cyclone...[was] picked by practically every All-American selector of standing." Associated Press sports editor Alan Gould wrote: "Without Bernard, the Wolverines could hardly have topped the toughest league in the country." Along with Whitey Wistert, Bernard was one of chief reasons why 1933 Wolverine lines were said to be "impregnable."

=== Gerald Ford ===
Bernard is also remembered as the All-American center for whom U.S. President Gerald Ford served as a backup in the 1932 and 1933 seasons. When President Ford was asked in his later years about his greatest regret in life, he thought for a moment and said: "Well, I wanted to play more football as a sophomore and junior, but one year ahead of me, Michigan also had an All-American center, Chuck Bernard. I was the better offensive center, but Chuck was 25 pounds heavier and better on defense. And in those days a coach played one guy. So that was my great regret." The interviewer asked, "But, Mr. President, what about losing the election in '76?" Ford laughed and said, "Oh, well, that too."

Ford told his biographer that it was a terrible let-down to sit on the sidelines. Ford noted: "So here I am, great prospects as a sophomore, and my competition is All-American." Ford was forced to watch and play backup as Bernard started for the 1932 and 1933 National Championship teams. "Not playing was tough", Ford said, "but I learned a lot on the bench. I learned that there was the potential always that somebody could be better than you. And Chuck was better overall."

== Detroit Lions ==
In September 1934, Bernard signed a contract to play professional football for the Detroit Lions. He had accepted a job with a motor manufacturer after graduating from Michigan, rejecting prior efforts by the Lions to sign him. After playing in the Chicago College All-Star Game, in which the college all-stars played the NFL champion Chicago Bears to a scoreless tie, Bernard decided to try playing in the NFL. Bernard played 10 games for the Lions during their 1934 season. Due to a back injury suffered in the College All-Star Game, Bernard underwent two minor operations to relieve the condition and spent much of the 1934 as a backup to Clare Randolph.

== Later life ==
After retiring from professional football, Bernard worked for ten years for Ford Motor Company's internal security forces, then known as the Service Department. Bernard was sued in 1941 by a labor organizer who claimed that he had been beaten, tarred and feathered in Dallas, Texas, at the instigation of Ford personnel. Bernard was also the principal witness in an NLRB proceeding in 1943 concerning efforts to organize the plant protection personnel at the Ford River Rouge Complex. He served as the head of the plant police force at the Rouge plant until being relieved of those duties in November 1945.

In 1948, Bernard served as the line coach for the Michigan Tech Huskies. In July 1949, he was hired as the line coach at Auburn in Alabama.

Bernard was married. He and his wife, Ruth, had two sons and two daughters. Bernard lived in Dearborn, Michigan, in his later years. He died in April 1962 at age 50 and was buried at Michigan Memorial Park.

== See also ==
- List of Michigan Wolverines football All-Americans
