= Ashmore (disambiguation) =

Ashmore is a village in Dorset, England.

Ashmore may also refer to:

== Places ==
=== Australia ===
- Ashmore, Queensland, a suburb of the Gold Coast

=== New Zealand ===
- Ashmore, New Zealand, a suburb of Hamilton

=== United Kingdom ===
- Ashmore Green, a hamlet in Berkshire, England
- Ashmore Park, a housing estate in Wolverhampton, West Midlands, England

=== United States ===
- Ashmore, Illinois
- Ashmore, Texas
- Ashmore Township, Coles County, Illinois

== People ==
- Aaron Ashmore, Canadian actor
- Alf Ashmore, English football player
- Basil Ashmore, British theatrical director and author
- Bruce Ashmore, English race car designer
- Carl Ashmore, English author
- Chris Ashmore (born 1942), British racing driver
- Darryl Ashmore, American football player
- Edward Ashmore (1919–2016), senior Royal Navy officer
- Edward Ashmore (British Army officer) (1872–1953), founder of the Royal Observer Corps
- Frank Ashmore, American actor
- George Ashmore, English football player
- Gerry Ashmore, English Formula One driver
- Harry Ashmore, American journalist
- James Ashmore (disambiguation), several people
- Jim Ashmore, American basketball player
- John Ashmore (disambiguation), several people
- Jonathan Ashmore, British physicist
- Larry Ashmore, Canadian politician
- Leslie Ashmore, British naval officer
- Lewis Ashmore, American cleric and musician
- Marion Ashmore, American football player
- Myfanwy Ashmore, Canadian conceptual artist
- P. G. Ashmore, English physical chemist
- Robert T. Ashmore, American politician
- Shawn Ashmore, Canadian actor
- Trevor Ashmore, English coin counterfeiter
- Walter Ashmore, English football player
- Wendy Ashmore, American archaeologist
- William Ashmore, English cricketer

== Other ==
- ACV Ashmore Guardian, Australian patrol vessel
- Ashmore Group, British investment company
- Ashmore and Cartier Islands, two groups of uninhabited tropical islands in the Indian Ocean

== See also ==
- Ashmole (disambiguation)
