= Mississippi State Bulldogs men's basketball statistical leaders =

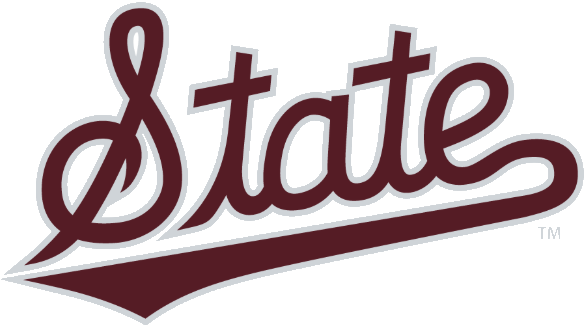

The Mississippi State Bulldogs men's basketball statistical leaders are individual statistical leaders of the Mississippi State Bulldogs men's basketball program in various categories, including points, three-pointers, assists, blocks, rebounds, and steals. Within those areas, the lists identify single-game, single-season, and career leaders. The Bulldogs represent Mississippi State University in the NCAA's Southeastern Conference.

Mississippi State began competing in intercollegiate basketball in 1908,. However, the school's record book does not generally list records from before the 1950s, as records from before this period are often incomplete and inconsistent. Since scoring was much lower in this era, and teams played much fewer games during a typical season, it is likely that few or no players from this era would appear on these lists anyway.

The NCAA did not officially record assists as a stat until the 1983-84 season, and blocks and steals until the 1985-86 season, but Mississippi State's record books includes players in these stats before these seasons. These lists are updated through the end of the 2023–24 season.

== Scoring ==
Career
Rank	Player	Points	Years
1	Jeff Malone	2,142	1979–80 1980–81 1981–82 1982–83
2	Josh Hubbard	2,045	2023–24 2024–25 2025–26 2026–27
3	Bailey Howell	2,030	1956–57 1957–58 1958–59
4	Quinndary Weatherspoon	2,012	2015–16 2016–17 2017–18 2018–19
5	Jim Ashmore	1,918	1953–54 1954–55 1955–56 1956–57
6	Rickey Brown	1,838	1976–77 1977–78 1978–79 1979–80
7	Ray White	1,652	1975–76 1976–77 1977–78 1978–79
8	Dee Bost	1,640	2008–09 2009–10 2010–11 2011–12
9	Darryl Wilson	1,619	1993–94 1994–95 1995–96
10	Barry Stewart	1,602	2006–07 2007–08 2008–09 2009–10

Single season
Rank	Player	Points	Year
1	Jeff Malone	777	1982–83
2	Jim Ashmore	708	1956–57
3	Josh Hubbard	707	2025–26
4	Bailey Howell	695	1957–58
5	Bailey Howell	688	1958–59
6	Bailey Howell	647	1956–57
7	Josh Hubbard	642	2024–25
8	Quinndary Weatherspoon	629	2018–19
9	Darryl Wilson	613	1995–96
10	Josh Hubbard	598	2023–24

Single game
Rank	Player	Points	Year	Opponent
1	Bailey Howell	47	1958–59	Union
2	Josh Hubbard	46	2025–26	Auburn
3	Jim Ashmore	45	1956–57	Ole Miss
	Bailey Howell	45	1957–58	LSU
5	Jim Ashmore	44	1956–57	LSU
6	Bailey Howell	43	1958–59	Florida
7	Josh Hubbard	42	2025–26	Georgia
8	Jim Ashmore	40	1956–57	Arkansas State
	Rickey Brown	40	1976–77	Auburn
10	Bailey Howell	39	1957–58	Southwestern
	Bailey Howell	39	1957–58	Murray State
	Jeff Malone	39	1982–83	Alabama

== Assists ==
Career
Rank	Player	Ast	Years
1	Dee Bost	633	2008–09 2009–10 2010–11 2011–12
2	Derrick Zimmerman	514	1999–00 2000–01 2001–02 2002–03
3	Al Perry	510	1974–75 1975–76 1976–77 1977–78
4	Jamont Gordon	484	2005–06 2006–07 2007–08 2008–09
5	Chuck Evans	454	1991–92 1992–93
6	Lamar Peters	429	2016–17 2017–18 2018–19
7	Doug Hartsfield	413	1987–88 1988–89 1989–90 1990–91
8	I. J. Ready	401	2013–14 2014–15 2015–16 2016–17
9	Cameron Matthews	379	2020–21 2021–22 2022–23 2023–24 2024–25
10	Jack Bouldin	357	1969–70 1970–71 1971–72

Single season
Rank	Player	Ast	Year
1	Chuck Evans	235	1992–93
2	Chuck Evans	219	1991–92
3	Derrick Zimmerman	210	2001–02
4	Al Perry	207	1975–76
5	Al Perry	199	1976–77
6	Dee Bost	188	2009–10
7	Jamont Gordon	187	2006–07
8	Detrick White	185	1998–99
9	Dee Bost	183	2011–12
10	Lamar Peters	176	2018–19

Single game
Rank	Player	Ast	Year	Opponent
1	Chuck Evans	16	1992–93	UMKC
2	Al Perry	15	1976–77	Vanderbilt
3	Chuck Evans	14	1992–93	Arkansas
	Chuck Evans	14	1992–93	South Carolina
	Gary Ervin	14	2004–05	Florida A&M
	Lamar Peters	14	2017–18	Nebraska (NIT First Round)
7	Al Perry	13	1975–76	Missouri Western
	Al Perry	13	1975–76	Auburn
	Al Perry	13	1975–76	Texas
	Chuck Evans	13	1991–92	Arkansas
	Chuck Evans	13	1992–93	Auburn
	Dee Bost	13	2011–12	Ole Miss
	Dee Bost	13	2011–12	UMass (NIT First Round)
	I. J. Ready	13	2016–17	LSU

== Blocks ==
NCAA Division I record

Career
Rank	Player	Blk	Years
1	Jarvis Varnado	564	2006–07 2007–08 2008–09 2009–10
2	Erick Dampier	249	1993–94 1994–95 1995–96
	Abdul Ado	249	2017–18 2018–19 2019–20 2020–21
4	Tyrone Washington	198	1995–96 1996–97 1997–98 1998–99
	Aric Holman	198	2015–16 2016–17 2017–18 2018–19
6	Kalpatrick Wells	183	1979–80 1980–81 1981–82 1982–83
7	Rickey Brown	163	1976–77 1977–78 1978–79 1979–80
8	Charles Rhodes	143	2004–05 2005–06 2006–07 2007–08
9	Wiley Peck	117	1975–76 1976–77 1977–78 1978–79
10	Gavin Ware	100	2012–13 2013–14 2014–15 2015–16

Single season
Rank	Player	Blk	Year
1	Jarvis Varnado	170	2008–09
	Jarvis Varnado	170	2009–10
3	Jarvis Varnado	157	2007–08
4	Erick Dampier	106	1995–96
5	Erick Dampier	78	1994–95
6	Jarvis Varnado	67	2006–07
	Abdul Ado	67	2017–18
	Abdul Ado	67	2020–21
9	Aric Holman	66	2017–18
10	Erick Dampier	65	1993–94
	Tyrone Washington	65	1998–99

Single game
Rank	Player	Blk	Year	Opponent
1	Jarvis Varnado	10	2007–08	Miami (FL)
	Jarvis Varnado	10	2007–08	Georgia
	Jarvis Varnado	10	2007–08	Kentucky
	Jarvis Varnado	10	2009–10	Arkansas
5	Jarvis Varnado	9	2007–08	Loyola Marymount
	Jarvis Varnado	9	2008–09	Louisiana-Monroe
	Jarvis Varnado	9	2009–10	Vanderbilt
	Abdul Ado	9	2019–20	Auburn
9	Kalpatrick Wells	8	1982-83	Vanderbilt (SEC tournament)
	Erick Dampier	8	1994-95	Utah (NCAA Round of 32)
	Erick Dampier	8	1995-96	BYU
	Tyrone Washington	8	1996-97	Old Dominion
	Jarvis Varnado	8	2008–09	Fairleigh Dickinson
	Jarvis Varnado	8	2008–09	Alabama State
	Jarvis Varnado	8	2008–09	Alabama
	Jarvis Varnado	8	2009–10	Southeastern Louisiana
	Jarvis Varnado	8	2009–10	UT-Pan American
	Jarvis Varnado	8	2009–10	Alabama

== Rebounds ==
Career
Rank	Player	Reb	Years
1	Bailey Howell	1,277	1956–57 1957–58 1958–59
2	Jarvis Varnado	1,096	2006–07 2007–08 2008–09 2009–10
3	Rickey Brown	1,092	1976–77 1977–78 1978–79 1979–80
4	Wiley Peck	964	1975–76 1976–77 1977–78 1978–79
5	Gavin Ware	888	2012–13 2013–14 2014–15 2015–16
6	Tolu Smith	865	2020–21 2021–22 2022–23 2023–24
	Cameron Matthews	865	2020–21 2021–22 2022–23 2023–24 2024–25
8	Erick Dampier	859	1993–94 1994–95 1995–96
9	Tyrone Washington	847	1995–96 1996–97 1997–98 1998–99
10	Kalpatrick Wells	830	1979–80 1980–81 1981–82 1982–83

Single season
Rank	Player	Reb	Year
1	Bailey Howell	492	1956–57
2	Bailey Howell	406	1957–58
3	Rickey Brown	389	1969–70
4	Bailey Howell	379	1958–59
5	Jarvis Varnado	369	1999–00
6	Lawrence Roberts	351	2004–05
7	Erick Dampier	317	1995–96
	Wiley Peck	317	1978–79
	Jarvis Varnado	317	2008–09
10	Arnett Moultrie	314	2011–12

Single game
Rank	Player	Reb	Year	Opponent
1	Bailey Howell	34	1956–57	LSU
2	Bailey Howell	31	1956–57	Memphis
	Bailey Howell	31	1957–58	Southwestern
4	Bailey Howell	26	1956–57	Georgia Tech
5	Bailey Howell	25	1957–58	Southeastern Louisiana
	Bailey Howell	25	1956–57	Tampa
7	Bailey Howell	24	1956–57	Ole Miss
	Bailey Howell	24	1958–59	Tulane
	Terry Kusnierz	24	1971–72	Arkansas
	Wiley Peck	24	1978–79	Memphis
	Wiley Peck	24	1978–79	Alabama

== Steals ==
Career
Rank	Player	Stl	Years
1	Cameron Matthews	272	2020–21 2021–22 2022–23 2023–24 2024–25
2	Ray White	217	1975–76 1976–77 1977–78 1978–79
3	Derrick Zimmerman	205	1999–00 2000–01 2001–02 2002–03
4	Quinndary Weatherspoon	199	2015–16 2016–17 2017–18 2018–19
5	Dee Bost	193	2008–09 2009–10 2010–11 2011–12
6	Craig Sword	185	2012–13 2013–14 2014–15 2015–16
7	Chuck Evans	165	1991–92 1992–93
8	Barry Stewart	162	2006–07 2007–08 2008–09 2009–10
9	Timmy Bowers	161	2000–01 2001–02 2002–03 2003–04
10	Tony Watts	154	1988–89 1989–90 1990–91 1991–92

Single season
Rank	Player	Stl	Year
1	Chuck Evans	83	1991–92
2	Chuck Evans	82	1992–93
	Cameron Matthews	82	2024–25
4	Derrick Zimmerman	75	2001–02
5	Cameron Matthews	73	2023–24
6	Winsome Frazier	71	2003–04
7	Dee Bost	66	2011–12
8	Ray White	61	1977–78
9	Ray White	60	1975–76
	Terry Lewis	60	1982–83
	Craig Sword	60	2013–14

Single game
Rank	Player	Stl	Year	Opponent
1	Gary Hooker	8	1975–76	Southwestern Louisiana
	Gary Hooker	8	1975–76	Samford
3	Calvin Holmes	7	1978–79	Louisville
	Jeff Norwood	7	1981–82	Kentucky
	Greg Lockhart	7	1985–86	Wichita State
	Fred Thomas	7	2012–13	Florida
	Craig Sword	7	2013–14	Ole Miss
	Cameron Matthews	7	2023–24	Missouri

== See also ==
- Mississippi State Bulldogs football statistical leaders
- Mississippi State Bulldogs women's basketball statistical leaders
