= Lamar Peters =

American basketball player (born 1998)

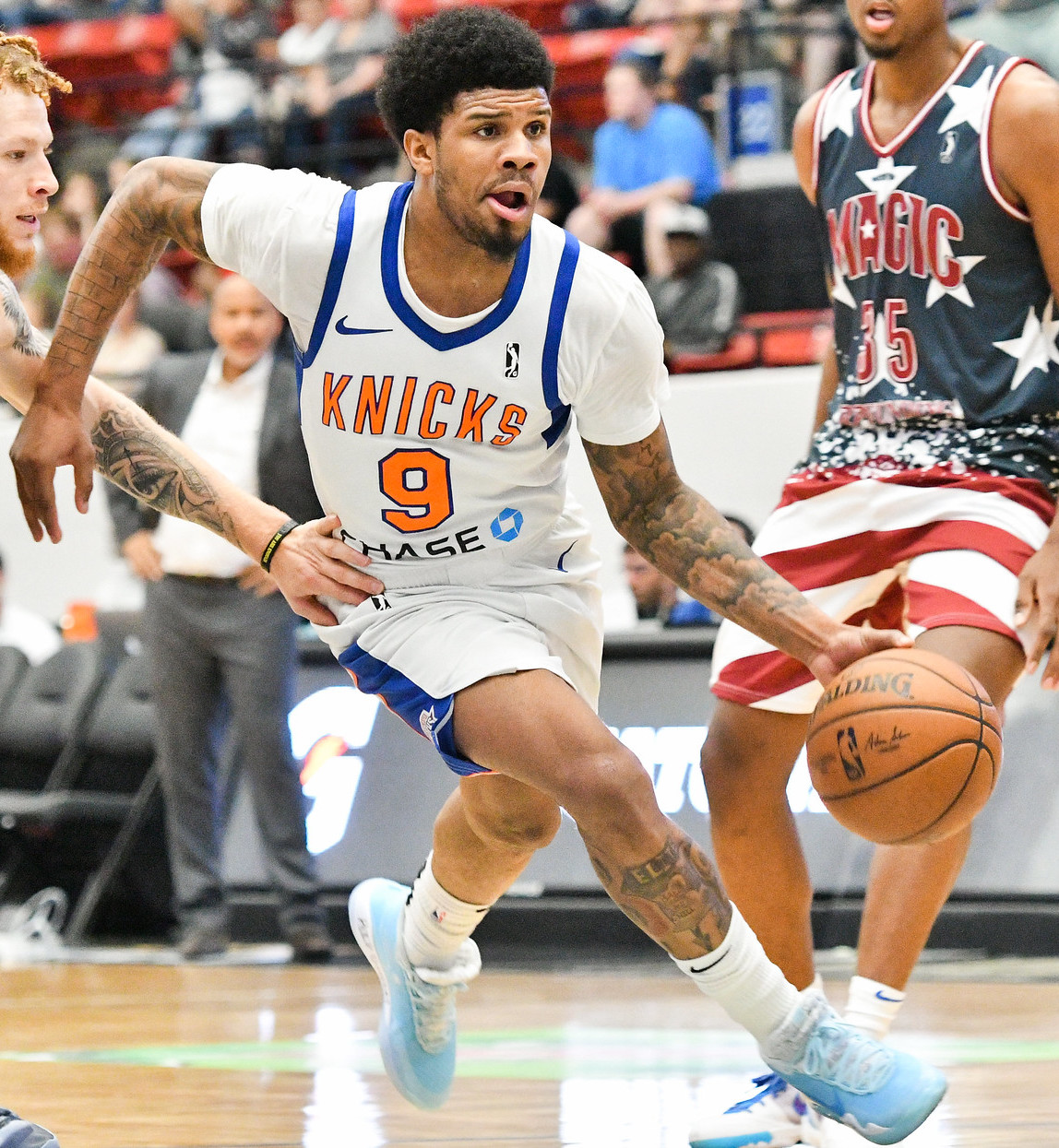

Personal information
- Born: June 19, 1998 (age 28) New Orleans, Louisiana, U.S.
- Listed height: 6 ft 0 in (1.83 m)
- Listed weight: 185 lb (84 kg)

Career information
- High school: Landry-Walker (New Orleans, Louisiana)
- College: Mississippi State (2016–2019)
- NBA draft: 2019: undrafted
- Playing career: 2019–2023
- Position: Point guard

Career history
- 2019–2020: Westchester Knicks
- 2020–2021: Bursaspor
- 2021–2022: Baskonia
- 2022: Fuenlabrada
- 2023: Karditsa
- Stats at Basketball Reference

Lamar Kendrell Anthony Peters (born June 19, 1998) is an American former professional basketball player. He played college basketball for the Mississippi State Bulldogs.

== Early life and high school ==
Peters was born in New Orleans, Louisiana and grew up in the city's 9th Ward in a single parent household as his father was incarcerated for most of his childhood. He attended Landry-Walker College and Career Preparatory High School, where he helped lead the Charging Buccaneers to back-to-back state championships in his sophomore and junior seasons. He averaged 19.7 points and was named first team All-Metro by The New Orleans Advocate during his junior season. Peters committed to Mississippi State over offers from LSU, Baylor. South Carolina, Memphis, Texas, Miami (Fla.) and Illinois going into his senior year. He said he developed a relationship with Bulldogs assistant coach Korey McCray. As a senior, Peters averaged 26 points and five assists and was named first team 5A All-State by the LSWA and was named the Outstanding Player of the Year for the New Orleans Metro Area by The Advocate.

== College career ==
As a true freshman, Peters averaged 10.7 points and 3.4 assists per game and was named to the Southeastern Conference (SEC) All-Freshman team. He averaged 9.6 points and 4.5 assists in his sophomore season and was named the SEC co-Player of the Week on February 26, 2018, after averaging 17 points, 5.5 rebounds, six assists and 2.5 steals in wins over Texas A&M and South Carolina. He declared for the 2018 NBA draft, but ultimately decided to return for his junior year. As a junior, Peters averaged 11.9 points, 5.2 assists and 1.7 steals per game. Peters was named the SEC co-Player of the Week a second time on December 10, 2018, after he averaged 27.5 points, five assists and eight 3-pointers made per game in performances against Clemson and McNeese State. Following the end of the season he again entered the NBA Draft and hired an agent, forgoing his final season of eligibility.

== Professional career ==
After going undrafted in the 2019 NBA draft, Peters joined the New York Knicks' summer league roster. Peters signed an Exhibit 10 contract with the Knicks on August 11, 2019. Peters was waived by the Knicks on October 19, 2019, and joined the team's NBA G League affiliate, the Westchester Knicks. On February 26, 2020, Peters set a new Westchester record with 19 assists to go with 19 points in a 129–115 win over the Greensboro Swarm. During the shortened 2019–20 season, Peters averaged 17.8 points, 7.3 assists, 2.8 rebounds, and 1.4 steals per game, shooting 42% from the field and 40% from three point range.

On December 6, 2020, he signed with Frutti Extra Bursaspor of the Turkish Super League (BSL).

On November 2, 2021, he signed with Baskonia of the Spanish Liga ACB and the EuroLeague. On February 10, 2022, Peters parted ways with the team.

On April 19, 2022, he signed with Fuenlabrada of the Spanish Liga ACB.

On January 13, 2023, he signed with Karditsa of the Greek Basket League. In 5 league games, he averaged 5 points and 1.6 assists in 18 minutes per contest, before suffering a season-ending injury.

== Personal life ==
Peters' best friend is Tyree Griffin, the point guard for Southern Miss. Peters' father, Walter Sterling, was killed in a shooting in New Orleans during his freshman season at Mississippi State.
