= Mississippi State Bulldogs women's basketball statistical leaders =

This article shows the statistical leaders of the Mississippi State Bulldogs women's basketball team. For statistical leaders of the school's men's team, see Mississippi State Bulldogs men's basketball statistical leaders.

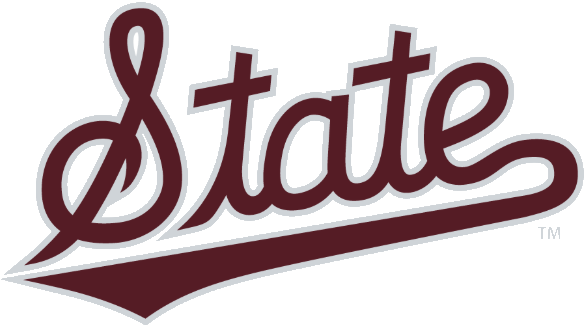

The Mississippi State Bulldogs women's basketball statistical leaders are individual statistical leaders of the women's basketball program of Mississippi State University in various categories, including points, three-pointers, assists, blocks, rebounds, and steals. Within those areas, the lists identify single-game, single-season, and career leaders. The Bulldogs represent Mississippi State in the NCAA's Southeastern Conference.

Mississippi State began competing in women's intercollegiate basketball in 1974, These lists are updated through the end of the 2022–23 season.

== Scoring ==
=== Points scored ===
Career
Rank	Player	Points	Points
1	LaToya Thomas	2,981	1999–00 2000–01 2001–02 2002–03
2	Victoria Vivians	2,527	2014–15 2015–16 2016–17 2017–18
3	Tan White	2,421	2001–02 2002–03 2003–04 2004–05
4	Teaira McCowan	1,942	2015–16 2016–17 2017–18 2018–19
5	JerKaila Jordan	1,899	2021–22 2022–23 2023–24 2024–25
6	Alexis Rack	1,756	2006–07 2007–08 2008–09 2009–10
7	Jessika Carter	1,750	2018–19 2019–20 2020–21 2022–23 2023–24
8	Jennifer Fambrough	1,677	1998–99 1999–00 2000–01 2001–02
9	LaCharlotte Smith	1,533	1992–93 1993–94 1994–95 1995–96
10	Sharon Thompson	1,526	1994–95 1995–96 1996–97 1997–98

Single season
Rank	Player	Points	Points
1	LaToya Thomas	794	2002–03
2	Victoria Vivians	773	2017–18
3	LaToya Thomas	763	2001–02
4	LaToya Thomas	752	2000–01
5	Teaira McCowan	710	2017–18
6	Mary Boatwright	689	1979–80
7	Tan White	681	2004–05
8	LaToya Thomas	672	1999–00
9	Kunshinge Sorrell	662	1987–88
	Teaira McCowan	662	2018–19

Single game
Rank	Player	Points	Year	Opponent
1	LaToya Thomas	48	2000–01	Memphis
2	Tan White	47	2004–05	Vanderbilt
3	LaToya Thomas	44	2000–01	Arkansas
4	LaToya Thomas	43	2001–02	Georgia
	Alexis Rack	43	2009–10	Maryland
6	Jennifer Fambrough	42	1998–99	Northwestern State
	LaToya Thomas	42	2002–03	Tulsa
8	Morgan William	41	2016–17	Baylor (NCAA Elite Eight)
	Teaira McCowan	41	2017–18	Mississippi Valley State
10	Daisy Casher	40	1983–84	Mississippi College
	Daisy Casher	40	1984–85	Union
	LaToya Thomas	40	2001–02	Florida
	Rickea Jackson	40	2021–22	McNeese State
	Jerkaila Jordan	40	2024–25	Missouri

=== Points per game ===
Career (minimum 50 games)
Rank	Player	PPG	PPG
1	LaToya Thomas	23.8	1999–00 2000–01 2001–02 2002–03
2	Kunshinge Sorrell	20.8	1986–87 1987–88
3	Tan White	20.0	2001–02 2002–03 2003–04 2004–05
4	Mary Boatwright	19.9	1986–87 1987–88
5	Daisy Casher	18.1	1983–84 1984–85
6	Victoria Vivians	17.1	2014–15 2015–16 2016–17 2017–18
7	Tutti Calhoun	16.5	1973–74 1974–75 1975–76 1976–77
8	Rickea Jackson	16.2	2019–20 2020–21 2021–22
9	JerKaila Jordan	14.5	2021–22 2022–23 2023–24 2024–25
10	LaCharlotte Smith	14.5	1992–93 1993–94 1994–95 1995–96

Single season
Rank	Player	PPG	PPG
1	LaToya Thomas	25.6	2002–03
2	LaToya Thomas	24.6	2001–02
3	LaToya Thomas	24.3	2000–01
4	Tan White	23.5	2004–05
5	Mary Boatwright	23.0	1979–80
6	Daisy Casher	22.4	1984–85
7	Kunshinge Sorrell	21.0	1986–87
	LaToya Thomas	21.0	1999–00
9	Tiffany Booker	20.8	1993–94
10	Kunshinge Sorrell	20.7	1987–88

=== 3-pointers ===
Career
Rank	Player	3s	3s
1	Alexis Rack	340	2006–07 2007–08 2008–09 2009–10
2	Victoria Vivians	281	2014–15 2015–16 2016–17 2017–18
3	Tan White	222	2001–02 2002–03 2003–04 2004–05
4	Mary Kathryn Govero	182	2007–08 2008–09 2009–10 2010–11
5	Debreasha Powe	176	2022–23 2023–24 2024–25
6	Blair Schaefer	175	2014–15 2015–16 2016–17 2017–18
	JerKaila Jordan	175	2021–22 2022–23 2023–24 2024–25
8	Cynthia Hall	147	1997–98 1998–99 1999–00 2000–01
9	LaCharlotte Smith	142	1992–93 1993–94 1994–95 1995–96
10	Meadow Overstreet	138	1997–98 1998–99 1999–00 2000–01

Single season
Rank	Player	3s	3s
1	Alexis Rack	108	2009–10
2	Blair Schaefer	97	2017–18
3	Alexis Rack	86	2008–09
4	Cynthia Hall	82	1999–00
	Alexis Rack	82	2007–08
6	Victoria Vivians	79	2015–16
7	Roshunda Johnson	76	2017–18
8	Mary Kathryn Govero	74	2009–10
9	Mary Kathryn Govero	71	2010–11
10	Victoria Vivians	69	2014–15
	Victoria Vivians	69	2017–18

Single game
Rank	Player	3s	Year	Opponent
1	Meadow Overstreet	8	1999–00	Mississippi Valley State
	Andra Espinoza-Hunter	8	2018–19	Arkansas (SEC Tournament Final)
3	Cynthia Hall	7	1999–00	Alabama A&M
	Jessica Carter	7	2001–02	Vanderbilt
	Tan White	7	2004–05	Auburn
	Alexis Rack	7	2007–08	Tennessee
	Alexis Rack	7	2008–09	Maryland
	Alexis Rack	7	2009–10	Maryland
	Alexis Rack	7	2009–10	Georgia
	Victoria Vivians	7	2015–16	Louisiana Tech
	Andra Espinoza-Hunter	7	2018–19	Texas A&M
	Caterrion Thompson	7	2021–22	Missouri

=== 3-point percentage ===
Career (minimum 100 attempts)
Rank	Player	3P%	3P%
1	Roshunda Johnson	42.4%	2016–17 2017–18
2	Jessica Carter	41.4%	2000–01 2001–02 2002–03 2003–04
3	Caterrion Thompson	40.0%	2020–21 2021–22
	Ahlana Smith	40.0%	2022–23
5	Blair Schaefer	38.5%	2014–15 2015–16 2016–17 2017–18
	Darrione Rogers	38.5%	2023–24
7	Bobbie Braddock	37.8%	1989–90 1990–91
8	Angela Harris	37.6%	1996–97 1997–98 1998–99 1999–00
9	Debreasha Powe	37.1%	2022–23 2023–24 2024–25
10	Meadow Overstreet	37.0%	1997–98 1998–99 1999–00 2000–01

Single season (minimum 40 attempts)
Rank	Player	3P%	3P%
1	Angela Harris	50.0%	1999–00
2	Jessica Carter	45.5%	2001–02
3	Chloe Bibby	45.0%	2018–19
4	Roshunda Johnson	43.8%	2016–17
5	Stacie Farris	43.4%	1994–95
6	Jemmye Ann Helms	43.1%	1994–95
7	LaToya Thomas	42.9%	2002–03
	Bre'Amber Scott	42.9%	2018–19
9	Andra Espinoza-Hunter	42.2%	2018–19
10	Roshunda Johnson	41.8%	2017–18

== Other statistics ==
=== Assists ===
Career
Rank	Player	Ast	Assists
1	Morgan William	656	2014–15 2015–16 2016–17 2017–18
2	Jazzmun Holmes	476	2015–16 2016–17 2017–18 2018–19
3	Angela Harris	463	1996–97 1997–98 1998–99 1999–00
4	Tan White	457	2001–02 2002–03 2003–04 2004–05
5	Alexis Rack	447	2006–07 2007–08 2008–09 2009–10
6	Myah Taylor	444	2018–19 2019–20 2020–21 2021–22
7	LaCharlotte Smith	406	1992–93 1993–94 1994–95 1995–96
8	Laura Springer	392	1977–78 1978–79 1979–80 1980–81
9	Polly Branch	391	1983–84 1984–85 1985–86 1986–87
10	Diamber Johnson	351	2008–09 2009–10 2010–11 2011–12

Single season
Rank	Player	Ast	Assists
1	Lauren Park-Lane	213	2023–24
2	Jazzmun Holmes	202	2018–19
3	Morgan William	181	2016–17
4	Angela Harris	179	1999–00
5	Morgan William	176	2015–16
	Morgan William	176	2017–18
7	Katia May	175	2013–14
8	Mary Boatwright	172	1980–81
9	Myah Taylor	159	2021–22
10	Alexis Rack	154	2009–10

Single game
Rank	Player	Ast	Year	Opponent
1	Polly Branch	17	1985–86	Bryan
2	Katia May	13	2013–14	Tennessee Tech
	Jazzmun Holmes	13	2018–19	Marquette
	Jazzmun Holmes	13	2018–19	Oregon (NCAA Elite Eight)
5	LaCharlotte Smith	12	1992–93	LSU
	Cynthia Hall	12	2000–01	Louisiana-Lafayette
	Alexis Rack	12	2008–09	Savannah State
	Jazzmun Holmes	12	2018–19	Arkansas (SEC Tournament Final)
9	Angela Harris	11	1999–00	UT-Pan American
	Marneshia Richard	11	2006–07	South Carolina
	Katia May	11	2013–14	Houston
	Katia May	11	2013–14	New Orleans
	Morgan William	11	2015–16	Savannah State
	Myah Taylor	11	2021–22	Alabama State
	Anastasia Hayes	11	2022–23	Tennessee

=== Blocks ===
Career
Rank	Player	Blk	Blocks
1	Martha Alwal	328	2011–12 2012–13 2013–14 2014–15
2	Teaira McCowan	271	2015–16 2016–17 2017–18 2018–19
3	Jessika Carter	238	2018–19 2019–20 2020–21 2022–23 2023–24
4	Chanel Mokango	180	2008–09 2009–10
5	Tan White	118	2001–02 2002–03 2003–04 2004–05
6	LaToya Thomas	109	1999–00 2000–01 2001–02 2002–03
7	JerKaila Jordan	94	2021–22 2022–23 2023–24 2024–25
8	Madison Francis	88	2025–26
9	Sharon Thompson	86	1994–95 1995–96 1996–97 1997–98
10	Sherise Williams	75	2012–13 2013–14 2014–15 2015–16

Single season
Rank	Player	Blk	Blocks
1	Chanel Mokango	97	2008–09
	Martha Alwal	97	2013–14
3	Madison Francis	88	2025–26
4	Teaira McCowan	87	2018–19
5	Chanel Mokango	83	2009–10
6	Martha Alwal	82	2011–12
7	Teaira McCowan	81	2017–18
8	Martha Alwal	78	2012–13
9	Martha Alwal	71	2014–15
10	Jessika Carter	65	2022–23

Single game
Rank	Player	Blk	Year	Opponent
1	Martha Alwal	10	2011–12	Jacksonville State
2	Chanel Mokango	9	2008–09	Ole Miss
3	Martha Alwal	8	2011–12	Mississippi Valley State
	Martha Alwal	8	2012–13	Alabama
5	Chanel Mokango	7	2008–09	Tennessee
	Martha Alwal	7	2011–12	Georgia
	Martha Alwal	7	2012–13	Florida Atlantic
	Martha Alwal	7	2013–14	Alabama
	Teaira McCowan	7	2018–19	Southeast Missouri State
	Madison Francis	7	2025–26	Charlotte

=== Rebounds ===
Career
Rank	Player	Reb	Rebounds
1	Teaira McCowan	1,502	2015–16 2016–17 2017–18 2018–19
2	Jessika Carter	1120	2018–19 2019–20 2020–21 2022–23 2023–24
3	LaToya Thomas	1,108	1999–00 2000–01 2001–02 2002–03
4	Martha Alwal	1,010	2011–12 2012–13 2013–14 2014–15
5	Sharon Thompson	936	1994–95 1995–96 1996–97 1997–98
6	Tan White	844	2001–02 2002–03 2003–04 2004–05
7	Sophie Ratliff	822	1986–87 1987–88 1988–89 1989–90
8	Victoria Vivians	783	2014–15 2015–16 2016–17 2017–18
9	Nitra Perry	746	1996–97 1997–98 1998–99 1999–00
10	JerKaila Jordan	733	2021–22 2022–23 2023–24 2024–25

Single season
Rank	Player	Reb	Rebounds
1	Teaira McCowan	544	2017–18
2	Teaira McCowan	487	2018–19
3	Madina Okot	325	2024–25
4	Martha Alwal	317	2013–14
5	Jessika Carter	316	2023–24
6	Sandra Butler	314	1982–83
7	Favour Nwaedozi	311	2025–26
8	LaToya Thomas	308	2001–02
9	Sandra Butler	307	1983–84
10	Anriel Howard	301	2018–19

Single game
Rank	Player	Reb	Year	Opponent
1	Sophie Ratliff	26	1987–88	Shorter
2	Ann Lashley	25	1985–86	Judson
	Teaira McCowan	25	2017–18	Louisville (NCAA Final Four)
4	Jackie Perry	24	1987–88	Vanderbilt
	Teaira McCowan	24	2018–19	South Carolina
6	Louise Grimes	23	1981–82	Southwestern Louisiana
7	Martha Alwal	23	2013–14	Ole Miss
	Madina Okot	23	2024–25	Vanderbilt
	Favour Nwaedozi	23	2025–26	Southern Miss
10	LaToya Thomas	22	2001–02	Montana
	Martha Alwal	22	2011–12	Alcorn State
	Teaira McCowan	22	2018–19	Arkansas

=== Steals ===
Career
Rank	Player	Stl	Steals
1	Tan White	372	2001–02 2002–03 2003–04 2004–05
2	JerKaila Jordan	273	2021–22 2022–23 2023–24 2024–25
3	Kunshinge Sorrell	238	1986–87 1987–88
4	LaCharlotte Smith	230	1992–93 1993–94 1994–95 1995–96
5	Victoria Vivians	218	2014–15 2015–16 2016–17 2017–18
6	Dominique Dillingham	210	2013–14 2014–15 2015–16 2016–17
7	Lisa Scott	205	1988–89 1989–90 1990–91 1991–92
8	Alexis Rack	202	2006–07 2007–08 2008–09 2009–10
9	Myah Taylor	196	2018–19 2019–20 2020–21 2021–22
10	Angela Harris	189	1996–97 1997–98 1998–99 1999–00

Single season
Rank	Player	Stl	Steals
1	Kunshinge Sorrell	122	1987–88
	Sonya Meadows	122	1980–81
3	Kunshinge Sorrell	116	1986–87
4	Tan White	104	2002–03
5	Tan White	91	2001–02
	Tan White	91	2003–04
	Porsha Porter	91	2011–12
8	Armelie Lumanu	89	2009–10
9	Tan White	86	2004–05
10	Savannah Carter	78	2013–14
	Myah Taylor	78	2021–22

Single game
Rank	Player	Stl	Year	Opponent
1	Sonya Meadows	12	1980–81	UT-Martin
2	Kunshinge Sorrell	9	1986–87	William Carey
	Kunshinge Sorrell	9	1987–88	Vanderbilt
	Angela Harris	9	1999–00	UT-Pan American
5	Kunshinge Sorrell	8	1986–87	UC-Santa Barbara
	Kunshinge Sorrell	8	1987–88	William Carey
7	Kunshinge Sorrell	7	1987–88	UAB
	Kunshinge Sorrell	7	1987–88	Tulane
	Kunshinge Sorrell	7	1987–88	Montana State (NWIT)
	Tan White	7	2002–03	UT-Pan American
	Marneshia Richard	7	2006–07	Purdue
	Porsha Porter	7	2011–12	Jacksonville State
	Savannah Carter	7	2013–14	New Orleans
	Jordan Danberry	7	2019–20	Marquette
	Myah Taylor	7	2021–22	Alcorn State
	Myah Taylor	7	2021–22	Alabama
	JerKaila Jordan	7	2022–23	Texas A&M–Commerce
	Madison Francis	7	2025–26	Alabama

== See also ==
- Football statistical leaders
- Men's basketball statistical leaders
