= Ashmole =

Ashmole may refer to:

- Ashmole Bestiary, 12th-13th century English illuminated manuscript bestiary
- Ashmolean Museum, art and archaeology museum in Oxford, England
- Bernard Ashmole, British archaeologist and art historian
- Elias Ashmole, English antiquary, politician, officer of arms, astrologer, freemason and student of alchemy
- Philip Ashmole, English conservationist and zoologist
- William Ashmole, English footballer
- Museum of the History of Science, Oxford, also referred to as the "Old Ashmolean Building"
- Ashmole Academy, Southgate, London

== See also ==
- Ashmore
- Ashmore (disambiguation)
