= Earl C. Hayes =

American football, basketball, and track and field coach

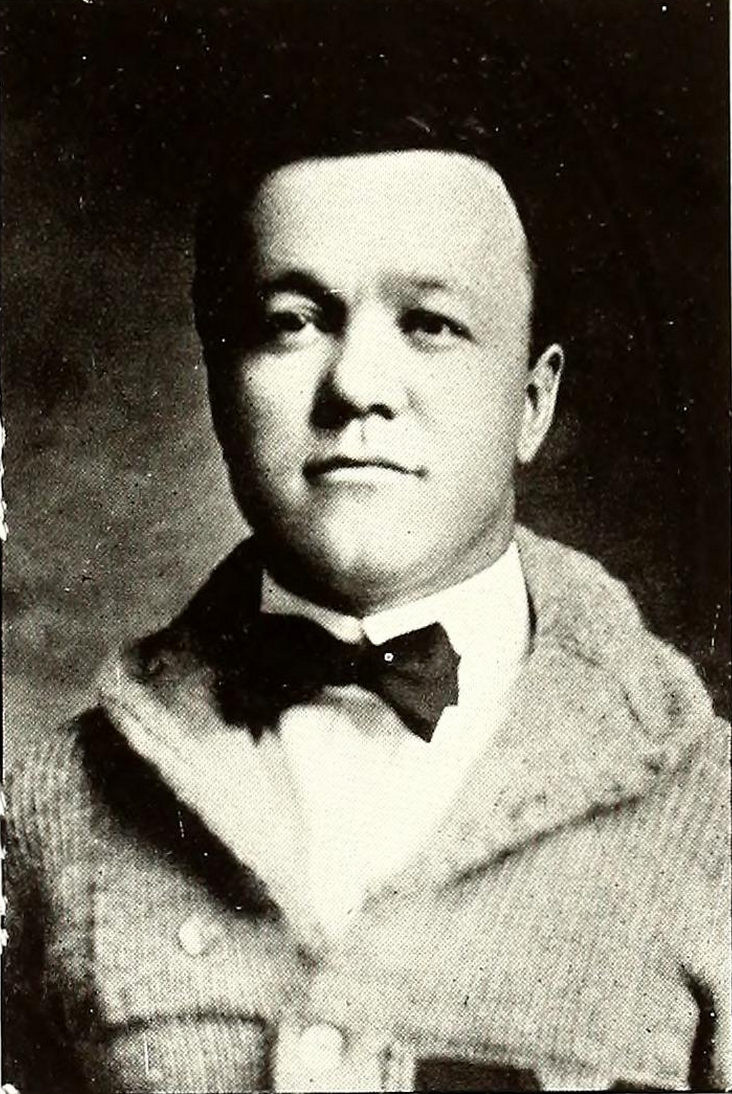
- Hayes pictured in Reveille 1916, Mississippi State yearbook

Biographical details
- Born: November 21, 1884 near Madison, Indiana, U.S.
- Died: December 16, 1943 (aged 59); Bloomington, Indiana, U.S.
- Education: Albion College

Coaching career (HC unless noted)

Football
- 1914–1916: Mississippi A&M
- 1931–1933: Indiana

Basketball
- 1911–1924: Mississippi A&M

Track and field
- 1924–1943: Indiana

Head coaching record
- Overall: 21–22–6 (football); 124–54 (basketball)

Accomplishments and honors

Championships
- Basketball; 4 SIAA regular season (1912–1914, 1916)

Earl C. "Billy" Hayes (November 21, 1884 – December 16, 1943) was an American college football, college basketball, and track and field coach. Hayes served as the head football coach at Mississippi Agricultural & Mechanical College—now known as Mississippi State University—from the 1914 to 1916 seasons. During his three-season tenure, he compiled an overall record of 15–8–2 At Mississippi A&M, he was also as the head basketball coach from 1912 to 1924, tallying aa mark of 124–54. From 1924 to 1943, he coached track and field at Indiana University Bloomington. Hayes was also the head football coach at Indiana from 1931 to 1933, compiling a record of 6–14–4.

Hayes died of pneumonia at age 59 on December 16, 1943, in Bloomington, Indiana.

== Head coaching record ==
=== Football ===
Year	Team	Overall	Conference	Standing	Bowl/playoffs
Mississippi A&M Aggies (Southern Intercollegiate Athletic Association) (1914–1916)
1914	Mississippi A&M	6–2	4–2		
1915	Mississippi A&M	5–2–1	4–2		
1916	Mississippi A&M	4–4–1	2–4		
Mississippi A&M:		15–8–2	10–8		
Indiana Hoosiers (Big Ten Conference) (1931–1933)
1931	Indiana	2–5–1	1–4–1	7th	
1932	Indiana	3–4–1	1–4–1	8th	
1933	Indiana	1–5–2	0–3–2	T–8th	
Indiana:		6–14–4	2–11–4		
Total:		21–22–6			

=== Basketball ===
Record table
Season	Team	Overall	Conference	Standing	Postseason
Mississippi A&M Aggies (Southern Intercollegiate Athletic Association) (1911–1924)
1911–12	Mississippi A&M	9–0	6–0	2nd	
1912–13	Mississippi A&M	11–1	6–0	1st	
1913–14	Mississippi A&M	13–2	10–2	1st	
1914–15	Mississippi A&M	8–6			
1915–16	Mississippi A&M	11–5	5–5		
1916–17	Mississippi A&M	6–4			
1918–19	Mississippi A&M	4–3			
1919–20	Mississippi A&M	12–5			
1920–21	Mississippi A&M	10–6			
1921–22	Mississippi A&M	12–10			
1922–23	Mississippi A&M	15–4			
1923–24	Mississippi A&M	13–8			
Mississippi A&M:		124–54			
Total:		124–54			
National champion Postseason invitational champion Conference regular season champion Conference regular season and conference tournament champion Division regular season champion Division regular season and conference tournament champion Conference tournament champion
