= John Ashmore =

John Ashmore may refer to:

- John D. Ashmore (1819–1871), American politician
- John Ashmore (translator) (fl. 1621), English translator

== See also ==
- Jonathan Ashmore (born 1948), British physicist
- Ashmore (disambiguation)
