= 1912–13 Mississippi A&M Aggies men's basketball team =

American college basketball season

1912–13 Mississippi A&M Aggies men's basketball

SIAA champion
- Conference: Southern Intercollegiate Athletic Association
- Record: 11–1 (6–0 SIAA)
- Head coach: Earl C. Hayes (2nd season)

The 1912–13 Mississippi A&M Aggies basketball team represented Mississippi A&M College in the 1912–13 college basketball season.
