= Reynard Motorsport =

British racing car manufacturer

- Industry: Auto racing design and production
- Founded: 1973, 2007 (revival)
- Founder: Adrian Reynard
- Defunct: 2003
- Headquarters: Brackley, England, UK
- Website: www.adrianreynard.com

Reynard Motorsport was the world's largest racing car manufacturer in the 1980s. Initially based at Bicester and latterly at Reynard Park, Brackley, England the company built successful cars in Formula Ford 1600, Formula Ford 2000, Formula Vauxhall Lotus, Formula Three, Formula 3000 and CART.

== History ==
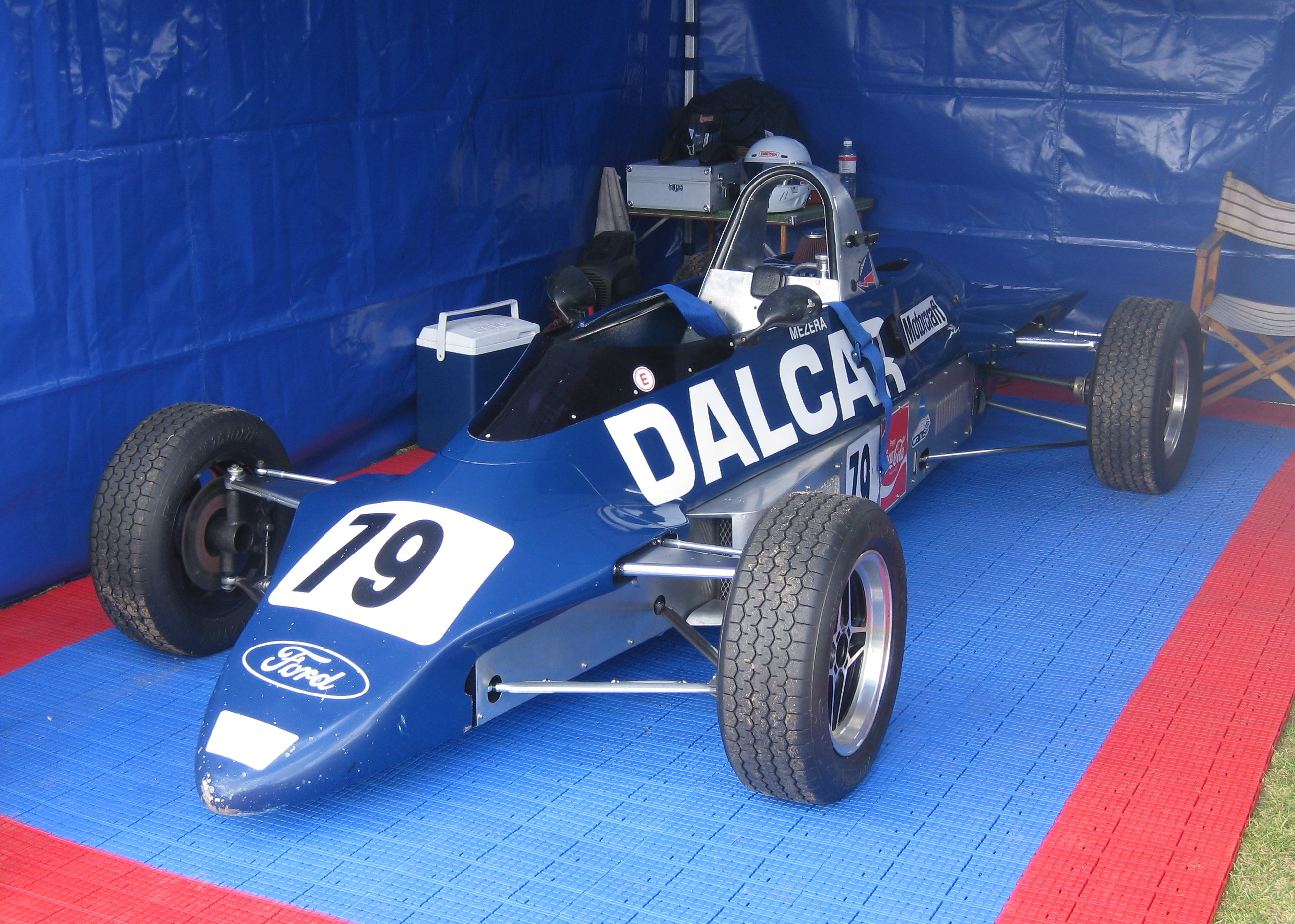
The Reynard FF83 was Reynard's 1983 Formula Ford model

Founded by Adrian Reynard in 1973 as Sabre Automotive Ltd, the company built on its success in lower formulae (particularly Formula Ford and its variants; Reynard himself was a top driver in Formula Ford 2000 in the late seventies) to progress in March 1994 to Championship Auto Racing Teams (CART) Indy car racing and collaborate with British American Racing from 1999 in the design of its early Formula One cars. Adrian Reynard formed a very effective working partnership with friend and Formula Ford rival Rick Gorne, who looked after the sales and commercial side of the business. Gorne was one of the first people to bring a commercial mindset to the sale of racing cars. He worked out pricing models for cars and spares (basing this on research into how often cars were damaged) and started "networking" with young drivers early in their careers so that they would be favourably disposed towards Reynard later.

Reynard acquired a reputation for being a marque whose cars won in their first race—they achieved this on their debuts in Formula Ford 1600, Formula Ford 2000, Formula Three (1985), Formula Atlantic, Formula 3000 (1988) and CART (1994). Reynard effectively wiped March, Lola and Ralt out of Formula 3000 and Lola out of Indy Car. Lola recovered by securing the one-make contract for F3000 and reviving themselves in Indy Car in the late 1990s. Reynard were also involved with various special projects; the first competition versions of the Panoz Esperante, the Dodge Stratus touring car, the highly successful Dodge Viper GTS-R GT car and an unraced and highly innovative LNG gas-turbine powered hybrid sports prototype for Chrysler known as the Patriot. Naturally given Reynard's involvement with BAR there were high expectations for the team's F1 debut, which were not met.

Reynard's success in F3 was transitory, with Dallara and a revived Ralt obliterating them from the market in 1992; Adrian Reynard sought to buy Ralt but the company ended up in the hands of March. Their success in CART and F3000 was more lasting, though.

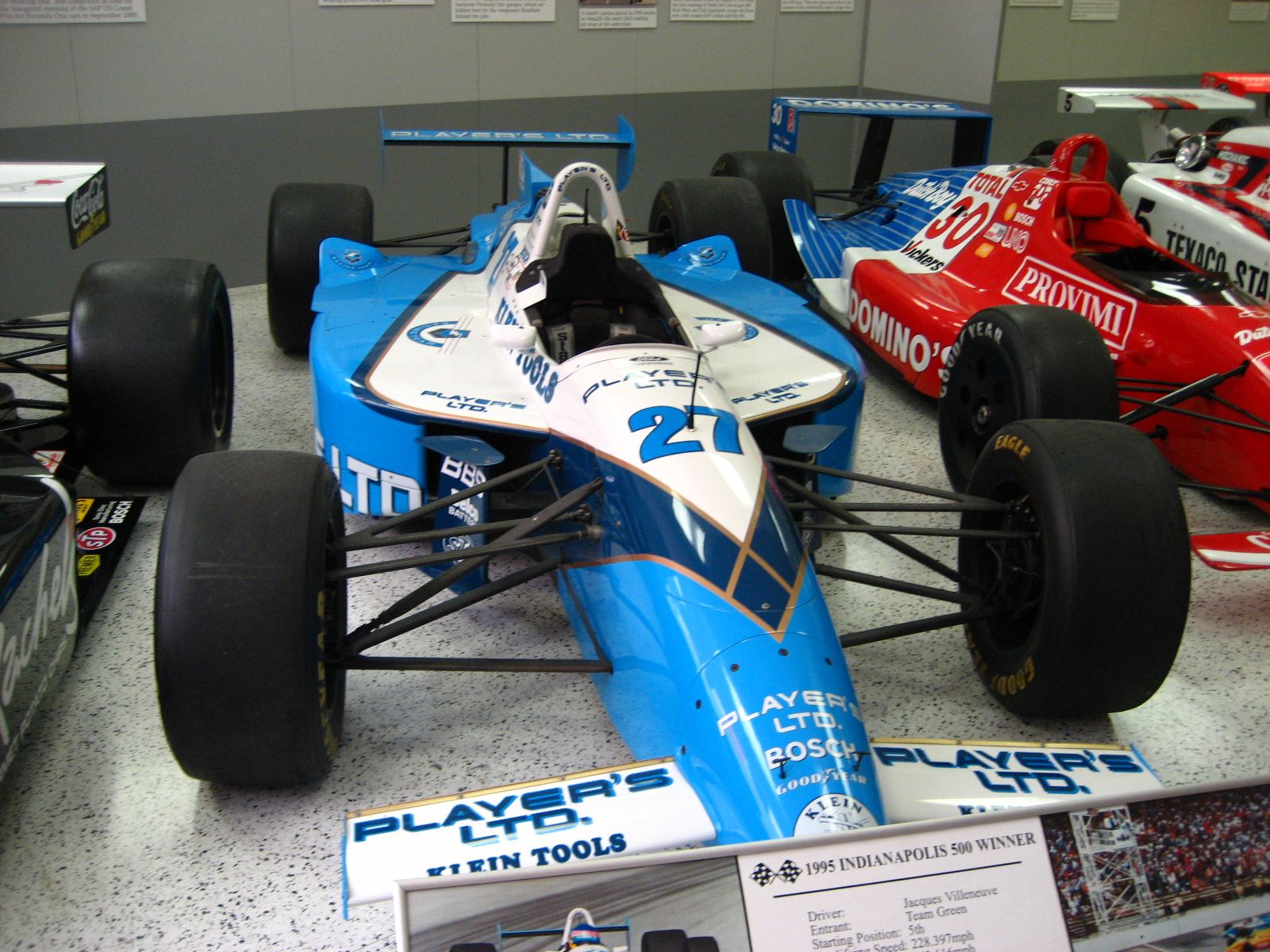
Jacques Villeneuve's Reynard CART chassis which won the Indianapolis 500.

Even when individual chassis programmes did not work out for Reynard, Gorne usually managed to make a profit—the 1985 Formula Ford car was a disaster, so the entire programme was sold on for a one-make series behind the Iron Curtain. Reynard acquired various other lucrative contracts for one-make racing series over the years, as well as achieving numerical domination in many open-chassis formulae; the Formula Vauxhall (or Opel) Lotus single seaters of the late 1980s were designed and manufactured for several years by Reynard (picking up on the firm's spare capacity after Formula Ford 2000 died out).

Outside motorsport, in the 1990s the company became involved in a project to build lightweight carbon-fibre airline seats for Richard Branson's Virgin Atlantic. The deal came about through friendship between Reynard and Branson. The joint-venture company that built manufactured these seats was located at Reynard's headquarters in Brackley.

As a result of its success the company was awarded the Queen's Awards for Export Achievement in 1990 and 1996.

The company started preparing a Formula 1 program in 1989, to debut in 1992. Engineers were hired, such as Rory Byrne from Benetton. In 1991, Reynard was not able to push through, so the entire program, including the Enstone factory, was sold to Benetton. Reynard's research data was sold to Ligier. Some Reynard components (mostly F3000-based) were used by Keith Wiggins' Pacific Racing in their unsuccessful F1 car (built for the 1993 season, but not raced until 1994 for budgetary reasons). It is unlikely that the putative 1992 Reynard would have been a significant success even had the money been available to develop it—the only works engine the team could obtain was the Yamaha unit that subsequently gave Jordan Grand Prix so much trouble that year. Reynard was also involved in the construction of the DAMS GD-01 car, which never raced due to the DAMS team deciding not to enter the championship.

Toward the late 1990s Reynard was primarily involved in CART, Formula Nippon and Barber Dodge racing series. The company also engineered sports and touring cars.

The success in CART was highly profitable and led the company to diversify. In 1999 Reynard purchased Gemini Transmissions and US racing car manufacturer Riley & Scott. The company also opened an R&D facility in Indianapolis called the Auto Research Center (ARC) under the guidance of Bruce Ashmore. This facility soon came to house a 50% scale wind tunnel and seven post shaker rig. Adrian Reynard is still involved with ARC.

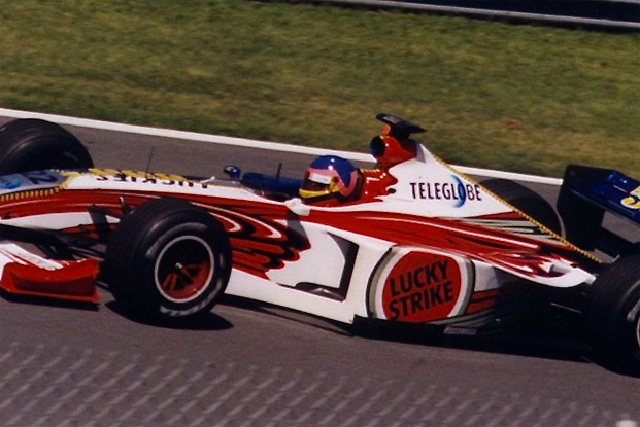
The BAR 01, co-designed by Reynard

Adrian Reynard and his chief designer Malcolm Oastler became involved with the BAR F1 team, with Reynard Motorsport providing some design services to the F1 outfit and culminated only 2 podiums during the partnership.

Reynard worked in partnership with West Surrey Racing to design and build Ford Mondeo chassis for the British Touring Car Championship from 1996 to 1998. WSR was running the works Ford programme, and ran the race team while Reynard handled the technical side. The project was well funded by Ford, but had only limited success throughout its three-season stint with the Mondeo.

== Bankruptcy ==
Following an aborted IPO on the New York Stock Exchange and the costly purchase of Riley & Scott, the company was bankrupted in February 2002. Around 120 jobs were lost.

In 2002, the assets were distributed among three buyers. BAR acquired the buildings at Brackley and the Advantage CFD aerodynamics engineering business. International Racing Management of Guildford acquired the Formula Nippon and sports car racing operations, with the sports cars being licensed to Zytek Engineering for construction. Walker Racing, a team in the Champ Car World Series, acquired the rights to the Champ Car chassis. Walker Racing in turn sold these to a business man in Ecuador, Alex Salazar, who tried to launch a series in Ecuador, without success.

Derivatives of the Reynard 2KQ and its 01Q upgraded continued to be raced and later upgraded by teams such as ProTran and Nasamax. The unfinished Reynard 02S became hugely successful when RN Motorsport took over the car as a DBA4 03S, followed by Zytek Engineering offering a variant termed the 04S, while Creation Autosportif offered their own variant known as the CA06/H, which continued to race until 2009.

The Grand Prix Masters car is essentially a development of the last generation of Reynard Champ Car chassis, although fitted with slightly different bodywork and a larger normally aspirated Cosworth V8 engine.

Adrian Reynard commented, "It is the worst day of my business life and in the history of the company. Reynard has had so much success over the last three decades and I'm devastated that it has ended this way, but we had no choice."

Some senior employees went on to start up new motorsport businesses, notably Simon Dowson with Delta Motorsport, Kieron Salter with KW Motorsport and sales manager James Linton took over Swift Racing Cars. KWM supplied a range of engineering consultancy services in Champ Car and the Le Mans Series including the design of the Nasamax, Protran and Creation Autosportif chassis that are based on Reynard's original products. Delta Motorsport were responsible for the design and construction of the Grand Prix Masters chassis.

== Revival ==
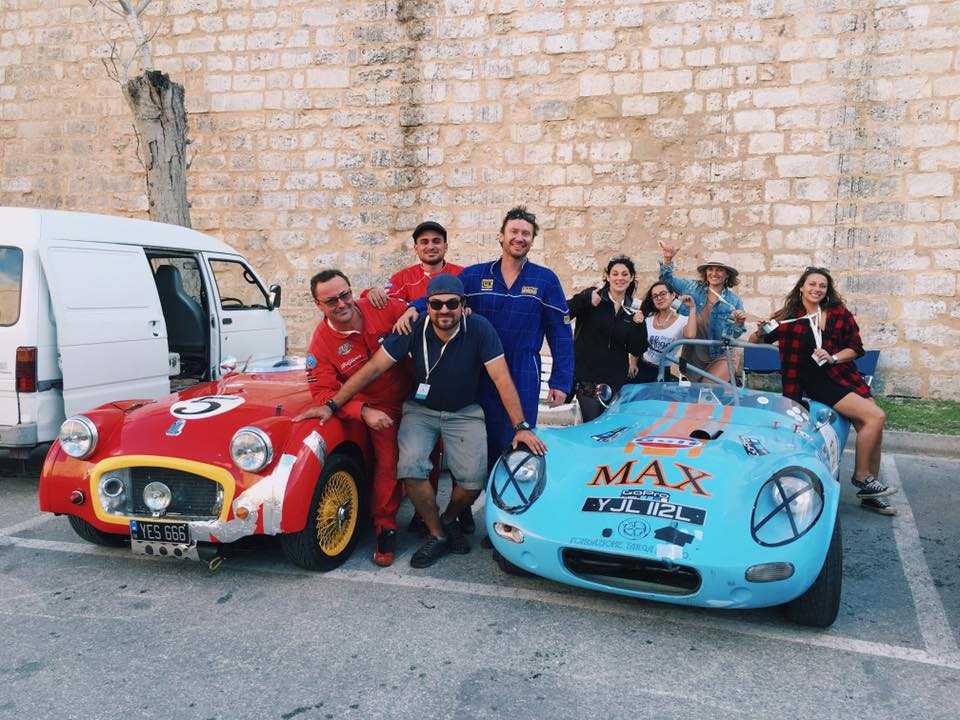
Reynard's Fisher Fury after 2nd place in the Malta Grand Prix 2017

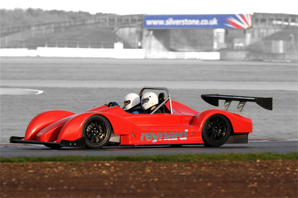
The new Reynard car being tested at Silverstone.

Reynard purchased a Fisher Fury in the early 2000s to better understand 750 bike-engined club racing and raced the Fury in mainly BRDA races. After much R&D with the 997cc Fisher he went on to design the Inverter.

In 2009, engineering director Andre Brown announced that the Reynard Racing Cars brand would return with a road-legal sportscar. The Reynard Inverter is aimed at British club racing scene where Reynard originally started. It became available in ready-built or in kit form and was Reynard's first road legal car. The car was designed to give Formula One levels of downforce.
