= 1913–14 Mississippi A&M Aggies men's basketball team =

American college basketball season

1913–14 Mississippi A&M Aggies men's basketball

SIAA champion
- Conference: Southern Intercollegiate Athletic Association
- Record: 13–2 (10–2 SIAA)
- Head coach: Earl C. Hayes (3rd season)

The 1913–14 Mississippi A&M Aggies basketball team represented Mississippi A&M College in the 1913–14 college basketball season.
