= James Ashmore =

James Ashmore may refer to:

- James Ashmore (footballer) (born 1986), English football player
- James N. Ashmore (1878–1944), American football, basketball, and baseball coach
- James Ashmore Creelman (1894–1941), American screenwriter
- Jim Ashmore (1935–2023), American basketball player
