= Alf Ashmore =

English footballer (born 1937)

Personal information
- Date of birth: 11 September 1937 (age 89)
- Place of birth: Woodhouse, England
- Position: Goalkeeper

Senior career*
Years	Team	Apps	(Gls)
1957–1961	Sheffield United	1	(0)
1961–1962	Bradford City	9	(0)
1962–1963	Chesterfield	2	(0)
- Heanor Town
Total		12	(0)
- * Club domestic league appearances and goals

Alfred Maxwell Ashmore (born 11 September 1937) is an English former professional footballer who played as a goalkeeper.

== Career ==
Born in Woodhouse, Ashmore played for Sheffield United, Bradford City and Chesterfield. For Sheffield United, he made 1 appearance in the Football League. For Bradford City, he made 9 appearances in the Football League. For Chesterfield, he made 2 appearances in the Football League. He later played non-league football for Heanor Town.

== Sources ==
- Frost, Terry (1988). Bradford City A Complete Record 1903-1988. Breedon Books Sport. ISBN 0-907969-38-0.
