= LaCharlotte Smith =

American basketball player (born 1974)

Personal information
- Born: February 6, 1974 (age 52) Oak Vale, Mississippi, U. S.
- Listed height: 6 ft 0 in (1.83 m)
- Listed weight: 150 lb (68 kg)

Career information
- High school: Prentiss (Prentiss, Mississippi)
- College: Mississippi State (1992–1996)
- Position: Point guard / shooting guard
- Number: 5

Career history
- 2000: Orlando Miracle

Career highlights
- 2x Second-team All-SEC (1995, 1996)
- Stats at WNBA.com
- Stats at Basketball Reference

LaCharlotte Smith (born February 6, 1974) is an American former professional basketball player who played for the Orlando Miracle of the Women's National Basketball Association (WNBA).

== High school career ==
Smith attended Prentiss High School in Prentiss, Mississippi. As a senior, she averaged 22 points per game and committed to play college basketball at Mississippi State University. Smith also played in the Alabama–Mississippi All-Star game, where she scored 19 points in a 74–61 win and was named the games' MVP.

== College career ==
In four seasons at Mississippi State, Smith played in 106 games, starting 95, averaging 14.5 points, 4.3 rebounds and 3.8 assists per game. She earned second-team All-Southeastern Conference honors in 1995 and 1996. When Smith graduated, she was the all-time leading scorer in school history with 1,533 points.

== Professional career ==
In 1999, Smith was on the Houston Comets training camp roster but ultimately did not make the team. On July 24, 2000, she signed a contract with the Orlando Miracle. She was working at a child care facility in Houston when she received a call from the team. Smith played in three regular season contests, averaging 1.7 points, 0.7 rebounds and 0.3 assists per game. She also played in one playoff game, recording no statistics. On November 30, 2000, Smith was released by the Miracle.

== Career statistics ==
Legend
| GP | Games played | GS | Games started | MPG | Minutes per game | RPG | Rebounds per game |
| APG | Assists per game | SPG | Steals per game | BPG | Blocks per game | PPG | Points per game |
| TO | Turnovers per game | FG% | Field-goal percentage | 3P% | 3-point field-goal percentage | FT% | Free-throw percentage |
| **Bold** | Career best | ° | League leader |

=== College ===
| Year | Team | GP | GS | MPG | FG% | 3P% | FT% | RPG | APG | SPG | BPG | TO | PPG |
|---|---|---|---|---|---|---|---|---|---|---|---|---|---|
| 1992–93 | Mississippi State | 27 | 24 | 28.9 | 36.0 | 25.0 | 71.1 | 3.5 | 4.1 | 1.9 | 0.1 | 4.2 | 9.8 |
| 1993–94 | Mississippi State | 25 | 18 | 24.4 | **37.0** | 24.0 | 65.4 | 3.6 | 2.3 | 1.9 | 0.3 | **3.7** | 13.6 |
| 1994–95 | Mississippi State | 27 | 26 | 30.6 | 35.8 | **29.1** | **75.4** | **5.1** | 3.7 | 2.0 | 0.3 | 4.0 | 16.4 |
| 1995–96 | Mississippi State | 27 | 27 | **35.0** | 33.8 | 28.1 | 75.0 | 4.9 | **5.1** | **2.9** | **0.4** | 5.1 | **17.9** |
| Career | | 106 | 95 | 29.8 | 35.5 | 27.2 | 72.1 | 4.3 | 3.8 | 2.2 | 0.3 | 4.3 | 14.5 |

=== Regular season ===
| Year | Team | GP | GS | MPG | FG% | 3P% | FT% | RPG | APG | SPG | BPG | TO | PPG |
|---|---|---|---|---|---|---|---|---|---|---|---|---|---|
| 2000 | Orlando Miracle | 3 | 0 | 4.0 | 66.7 | 0.0 | 100.0 | 0.7 | 0.3 | 0.7 | 0.0 | 0.7 | 1.7 |
| Career | | 3 | 0 | 4.0 | 66.7 | 0.0 | 100.0 | 0.7 | 0.3 | 0.7 | 0.0 | 0.7 | 1.7 |

=== Playoffs ===
| Year | Team | GP | GS | MPG | FG% | 3P% | FT% | RPG | APG | SPG | BPG | TO | PPG |
|---|---|---|---|---|---|---|---|---|---|---|---|---|---|
| 2000 | Orlando Miracle | 1 | 0 | 1.0 | — | — | — | 0.0 | 0.0 | 0.0 | 0.0 | 0.0 | 0.0 |
| Career | | 1 | 0 | 1.0 | — | — | — | 0.0 | 0.0 | 0.0 | 0.0 | 0.0 | 0.0 |
