= Korey McCray =

Korey Austin McCray (born January 22, 1979) is an American college basketball coach. He is the current Associate Head Coach of the Florida Gators men's basketball team. During the 2024-2025 season, under head coach Todd Golden, McCray helped the Gators to a national championship.

== Early life and education ==
McCray is from Decatur, Georgia, and graduated from Cedar Grove High School in 1997. He then enrolled at Mercer University, where he played guard for head coach Mark Slonaker from 1997 to 2001. During his college career, McCray led the Bears in assists in each of his four seasons. McCray earned a bachelor's degree in communications, with a minor in Christianity, from Mercer in 2001. He then enrolled at Florida State University as a graduate assistant for the men's basketball team, where he received a master's degree in adult education.

== Coaching career ==
After completing his college basketball career and undergraduate degree at Mercer University in 2002, McCray began his coaching career with the Florida State Seminoles as a graduate assistant under head coach Leonard Hamilton. During the 2003-04 season, the Seminoles qualified for the National Invitation Tournament.

=== Chipola College ===
In 2004, McCray joined the coaching staff at Chipola College in Marianna, Florida, as an assistant coach under head coach Greg Heiar. In his first season at Chipola, McCray was part of a team that finished 33-4, won the Panhandle Conference Championship and the FCCAA/NJCAA Region VIII Championship, and advanced to the NJCAA National Basketball Tournament, where Chipola finished fourth nationally.

=== Private trainer ===
From 2004 to 2011, McCray worked as a private skills trainer in Atlanta, Georgia, training and coaching over 30 NBA players. Among the players he worked with were Dwight Howard and John Wall, both of whom were selected first overall in the NBA draft.

=== Mercer University ===
In 2007, McCray returned to his alma mater, Mercer University, as an assistant coach under head coach Mark Slonaker, marking his first Division I coaching position.

=== UCLA ===
In 2011, McCray joined the UCLA Bruins men's basketball staff as an assistant coach under head coach Ben Howland. During his tenure, UCLA had the nation's top-ranked recruiting class in 2012. In the 2012-13 season, the Bruins won the Pac-12 Conference championship and earned a spot in the NCAA Tournament.

=== LSU ===
In 2013, McCray joined the LSU Tigers men's basketball staff as an assistant coach under head coach Johnny Jones.

=== Mississippi State ===
After his stint at LSU, McCray rejoined head coach Ben Howland at Mississippi State University as an assistant coach, where he coached seven seasons from 2015-2022. McCray's main responsibilities included working with guards, creating scouting reports, and all aspects of recruiting. McCray was ranked among the top recruiters in the nation and the SEC multiple times throughout his tenure.

=== Florida ===
On March 30, 2022, McCray joined head coach Todd Golden and the Florida Gators men's basketball staff as the associate head coach alongside Carlin Hartman.

== Personal life ==
McCray and his wife Lauren have two children, a daughter and a son.
