= Bruce Ashmore =

British racing driver

Bruce Ashmore (born c. 1959 in Cambridge, England) is a race car designer who designed and developed 11 championship winning IndyCars with two different race car manufacturers, first with Lola Cars and then with Reynard Motorsports.

After graduating from Cambridge University he started working for Lola Cars in Huntingdon, England. During his seventeen years with Lola he worked his way up from intern to chief designer. Bruce was a member of the design team for many race car projects and was the chief designer on the T88/00, T89/00, T90/00, T91/00 and T92/00 Lola IndyCars.

In 1993 Ashmore joined Reynard Motorsports to begin work on their first Indycar, the 94I. Within two years Reynard overtook Lola to become the leading Indycar chassis manufacturer.

Bruce's role with Reynard Motorsports took him to the United States, where he set up Reynard North America (RNA) in Indianapolis, Indiana and later built the Auto Research Center, also in Indianapolis. ARC became the Reynard North American Headquarters. Between 1993 and 1998 he served as Technical Director for RNA and later also for ARC and then in 1999 became president of RNA.

Ashmore joined the Forsythe Racing CART team in 2001. After two successful years with the team where he planned the Championship title bid in 2003, he left at the end of 2002 to start Ashmore Design. Ashmore Design has had contracts with Menard Competition Technologies, Menard Engineering, RuSPORT Champ Car team, Conquest Racing and more recently with C&R Racing Incorporated. Ashmore helped Chris Paulsen design the C&R Racing United States Auto Club (USAC) Silver Crown race car.
