= Wendy Ashmore =

American professor of Maya archaeology

Wendy Ann Ashmore
- Born: June 26, 1948
- Died: January 8, 2019 (aged 70)
- Occupations: Professor and scholar of Maya archaeology

Wendy Ann Ashmore (née Matthews; June 26, 1948 – January 8, 2019) was an American professor of Maya archaeology at the University of California, Riverside. She was involved in excavations in Belize, Guatemala, and Honduras. Her research focused on the implications that spaces, settlement patterns, and gender can have on social organization.

== Education ==
She received her B.A. from the University of California, Los Angeles in 1970 and her Ph.D. in 1981 from the University of Pennsylvania. Her dissertation analyzed the results of the site periphery program that took place between 1975 and 1979 at Quirigua, Guatemala. In her dissertation, she discusses the use of random sampling in the Maya region and offers suggestions for how research might be carried out in that region in the future.

== Career ==
In the 1980s, she taught archaeology at Rutgers University. She left for a position at the University of Pennsylvania.

=== Landscape archaeology ===
She was particularly interested in landscape archaeology. In her book with Arthur Bernard Knapp, Archaeology of Landscape: Contemporary Perspectives, Ashmore discusses the importance of the landscape to ancient Maya ritual and religious life. This work emphasizes the social and symbolic role of the landscape on the development of Maya culture and identity. Knapp and Ashmore claim that although ideologically important landscapes are not always marked in ways that leave traces archaeologically, it is still possible to glean clues from the landscape about what was important to the people using it. One important factor to keep in mind when examining sacred landscapes is architectural mimicry, or designing a building or collection of buildings to resemble the natural landscape. Examples of architectural mimicry include designing pyramids that resemble mountains or designing the layout of towns to resemble the area's natural topography.

=== Quirigua ===
In her article, Classic Maya Wells at Quirigua, Guatemala: Household Facilities in a Water-Rich Setting Ashmore argues that the presence of ceramic lined wells in eighth century Quirigua were an important innovation in spite of the fact that Quirigua was not a water-poor city. Ashmore argues that too much theoretical emphasis is often placed on innovations that are developed as the result of threats to survival. Even though there was always a ready supply of water available at Quirigua, the wells provide archaeologists with an excellent example of specialized Maya hydraulic technology.

=== Honduras ===
Teaming with her long-time friends and collaborators Edward Schortman and Patricia Urban from Kenyon College, Wendy started the Santa Barbara Archaeological Project in the early 1980s. Initially focusing on survey and excavations at the site of Gualjoquito, Honduras, it expanded to a large survey of the Ulua River Valley and adjacent areas.

In the article Playing with Power: Ballcourts and Ritual in Southern Mesoamerica with John Gerard Fox, John H. Blitz, Susan D. Gillespie, Stephen D. Houston, Ted J.J. Leyenaar, Joyce Marcus, Jerry D. Moore, Patricia A. Urban, Edward M. Shortman, and David Webster, Ashmore challenges the assumption that ballcourts functioned as public architecture in ancient Maya society. It suggests alternately that they instead functioned as a “lived space” more closely resembling households and private dwellings than public architecture like temples. The article argues that since the ballcourt was associated strongly with the supernatural, it functioned as a place where political and cosmological drama unfolded.

In the article Spatial Orders in Maya Civic Plans, Ashmore and Jeremy Sabloff address how the way the Maya laid out their cities, specifically their civic and ceremonial centers, reflects their beliefs about the universe and their place in it. They claim that landscape archaeology can be used to determine how the Maya conducted their politics and how they ran their government. Several archaeologists have criticized this approach for its lack of objectivity and for being ungrounded in empirical data. Critics have also claimed that it is too reliant on speculation. For many years, her textbook, coauthored with long-time collaborator Robert J. Sharer, Fundamentals of Archaeology was a top seller. She taught archaeology at Rutgers University for many years, where she was highly respected by all, and held in the highest esteem by her many students. She quickly became an expert in the history, ethnography and archaeology of the Lenape.

== Death ==
Ashmore died in 2019 at her home in Riverside, California.

== Publications ==
- Ashmore, Wendy; Jeremy Sabloff (June 2003). "Interpreting Ancient Maya Civic Plans: Reply to Smith". Latin American Antiquity. 14 (2): 229–236. doi:10.2307/3557597. JSTOR 3557597. S2CID 34862562.
- Ashmore, Wendy; John Gerard Fox; John H. Blitz; Susan D. Gillespie; Stephen D. Houston; Ted J. J. Leyenaar; Joyce Marcus; Jerry D. Moore; Patricia A. Urban; Edward M. Schortman; David Webster (June 1996). "Playing with Power: Ballcourts and Political Ritual in Southern Mesoamerica". Current Anthropology. 37 (3). University of Chicago Press: 483–509. doi:10.1086/204507. JSTOR 2744545. S2CID 143639092.
- Ashmore, Wendy (1984). "Classic Maya Wells at Quirigua, Guatemala: Household Facilities in a Water-Rich Setting". American Antiquity. 49 (1). Society for American Archaeology: 147–153. doi:10.2307/280519. JSTOR 280519. S2CID 163955942.
- Ashmore, Wendy; Arthur Bernard Knapp (1999). Archaeology of Landscapes: Contemporary Perspectives. Malden, MA: Blackwell Publishers.
- Sharer, Robert and Wendy Ashmore, Fundamentals of Archaeology (The Benjamin Cummings Publishing Co., Inc., 1979)
- Ashmore, Wendy, Dorothy Thompson Lippert and Barbara J. Mills, Voices in American Archaeology (Society for American Archaeology, Washington, DC, 2010)
- Ashmore, Wendy Excavaciones en el Centro Selecto de Gualiquito, Santa Barbara, Honduras. Paper presented at the "Third Seminar on Honduran Archaeology", Instituto Hondureno de Anthropologia e Historia, Tela, Honduras. 1984.
- Ashmore, W. and J. Benyo, Archaeological Research in Central Honduras 1983-1984. Paper presented at the 83rd Annual Meeting, American Anthropological Association, Denver, CO.
- Ashmore, W., P. Urban, Ed Schortman, and Jay Benyo "The Santa Barbara Archaeological Project: 1984 Season." Report prepared for Instituto Hondureno de Anthropologia e Historia, the National Endowment for the Humanities, and National Geographic Society.
- P. Urban, Ed Schortman, and W. Ashmore "El Proyecto Arqueologico Santa Barbara: El Primer Ano de Investigaciones". Paper presented at the "Second Seminar in Honduran Archaeology".Instituto Hondureno de Anthropologia e Historia. 1983.
- P. Urban, Ed Schortman, and W. Ashmore "Santa Barbara Archaeological Project: Results of the 1983 Season. Paper presented at the 82nd Annual Meeting, American Anthropological Association, Chicago, Il.
- Ashmore, W., P. Urban, Ed Schortman, and Jay Benyo et al. "1985 Season of the Santa Barbara Archaeological Project, Santa Barbara, Honduras". Report Prepared for the Instituto Hondureno de Anthropologia e Historia. 1985.
- Ashmore, W., P. Urban, Ed Schortman, and Jay Benyo "Proyecto Arqueological Santa Barbara, Honduras: Temporado de 1984". "Mexicon". 1986?
- Ashmore, W., P. Urban, and E. Schortman, and J. Benyo "Interregional Interaction in the SE Maya Periphery: the Santa Barbara Archaeological Project 1983–1984 Seasons". Journal of Field Archaeology. Volume 13, 1986 - Issue 3.
