= Mississippi State Bulldogs men's basketball =

College basketball team

2026–27 Mississippi State Bulldogs men's basketball team
- University: Mississippi State University
- First season: 1908
- Athletic director: Zac Selmon
- Head coach: Chris Jans; 5th season, 76–59 (.563)
- Location: Starkville, Mississippi
- Arena: Humphrey Coliseum (capacity: 10,575)
- NCAA division: Division I
- Conference: SEC
- Nickname: Bulldogs
- Colors: Maroon and white
- All-time record: 1,557–1,299 (.545)
- NCAA tournament record: 11–14 (.440)

NCAA Division I tournament Final Four
- 1996
Other NCAA Division I tournament results
Elite Eight	1996
Sweet Sixteen	1963, 1995, 1996
Appearances	1963, 1991, 1995, 1996, 2002, 2003, 2004, 2005, 2008, 2009, 2019, 2023, 2024, 2025

Conference tournament champions
- SoCon: 1923 SEC: 1996, 2002, 2009

Conference regular-season champions
- SIAA: 1913, 1914 SEC: 1959, 1961, 1962, 1963, 1991, 2004

Conference division champions
- SEC West: 1996, 2003, 2004, 2007, 2008, 2010

Uniforms
Home	Away	Alternate

The Mississippi State Bulldogs men's basketball program represents Mississippi State University near Starkville, Mississippi (Note: Virtually all of the campus, including all athletic facilities, is outside the Starkville city limits. The campus mailing address is Mississippi State, Mississippi.) in NCAA Division I men's basketball. The Bulldogs play in the Southeastern Conference. Mississippi State has qualified for the NCAA tournament 14 times and most recently in 2024.The Bulldogs best finish in the NCAA tournament came in 1996 when they advanced to the Final Four. On March 20, 2022, Mississippi State named former New Mexico State head coach Chris Jans as its 21st head basketball coach.

== History ==
The Bulldogs have been to the NCAA Tournament eleven times, the first time in 1963 and the most recent being 2024. Mississippi State chose not to accept previous bids because state officials viewed African-Americans as inferior and would not allow Ole Miss or Mississippi State to play against teams with African-American players. The 1963 team, however, famously snuck out of the state in the dead of night to play in what has since been dubbed the "Game of Change".

Six of the ten NCAA appearances have been earned in the past 10 seasons under former MSU Head Basketball Coach, Rick Stansbury. They have won 8 conference championships, two under coach Earl C. Hayes as a member of the now-dissolved Southern Intercollegiate Athletic Association in 1913 and 1914 in addition to six SEC titles in 1959, 1961, 1962, 1963, 1991, and 2004. The Bulldogs have won four conference tournament championships, one as a member of the Southern Conference in 1923 and three SEC tournament titles in 1996, 2002, and 2009. Mississippi State has several notable alumni including Erick Dampier, Bailey Howell, and Jarvis Varnado.

== Rivals ==
As in all sports, Mississippi State's rival is Ole Miss. Mississippi State leads the series over Ole Miss 142–112. Former MSU Head Coach Rick Stansbury is 21–8 vs the Rebels. Former head coach Ben Howland was 6–9 against the Rebels.

Mississippi State and Alabama are considered rivals on the court, with only 90 miles separating the two programs. The Crimson Tide lead the all-time series 120–74.

== Former players ==
=== All-Americans ===
Player	Position	Year(s)	Selectors
Jim Ashmore	Guard	1956–57	Converse, Associated Press, UPI, Helms Athletic Foundation
Bailey Germany (2)	Forward	1957–58, 1958–59	Helms Athletic Foundation, Associated Press, USBWA/Look Magazine, NABC, UPI, NEA
Red Walker (2)	Guard	1961–62, 1962–63	Davis Athletic Foundation, Converse, NABC, Associated Press
Leland Mitchell	Guard	1962–63	Converse
Rickey Campbell	Forward	1979–80	Citizen Saving Athletic Foundation, Associated Press
Mark Malone	Guard	1982–83	The Sporting News, Basketball Times, NABC
Greg Carter	Forward	1990–91	Associated Press
Chuck Evans	Guard	1991–92	UPI
Erick Thomas (2)	Center	1994–95, 1995–96	Associated Press
Mario Austin	Forward	2002–03	Associated Press, Foxsports.com
Lawrence Roberts (2)	Forward	2003–04, 2004–05	Associated Press, USBWA, NABC, The Sporting News
Jamont Gordon (2)	Guard	2006–07, 2007–08	Foxsports.com, Rivals, ESPN, Associated Press
Jarvis Christopher (2)	Forward	2008–09, 2009–10	Associated Press, College Basketball Insider
Dee Bost	Guard	2008–09	CollegeHoops.net
Source:MSU Media Guide

Notable basketball players who attended and played at Mississippi State University.

- Arnett Moultrie, 1st round, 2012 NBA draft.
- Jarvis Varnado, 2nd round, 2010 NBA draft. NCAA career record holder with 564 blocked shots. One of only two college players to have at least 1000 points, 1000 rebounds, and 500 blocked shots, the other being David Robinson.
- Lawrence Roberts, 2nd round, 2005 NBA draft.
- Timmy Bowers, 2006 Israeli Basketball Premier League MVP
- Malik Newman (born 1997), basketball player in the Israeli Basketball Premier League
- Derrick Zimmerman, 2nd round, 2003 NBA draft.
- Tyrone Washington, 2nd round, 1999 NBA draft.
- Dontae' Jones, 1st round, 1996 NBA draft.
- Erick Dampier, 1st round, 1996 NBA draft.
- Jeff Malone, 1st round, 1983 NBA draft. Two time NBA All-Star.
- Rickey Brown, 1st round, 1980 NBA draft.
- Wiley Peck, 1st round, 1979 NBA draft.
- Bailey Howell, 1st round, 1959 NBA draft. Six time NBA All-Star. Elected to the Naismith Memorial Basketball Hall of Fame in 1997.

== SEC West Division titles ==
The years the Bulldogs won were as follows: 1995, 1996, 2003, 2004, 2007, 2008, 2010

== Postseason ==
=== NCAA tournament results ===
The Bulldogs have appeared in the NCAA tournament 14 times. Their combined record is 11–14.

The Bulldogs qualified for the 1959 tournament but university president Benjamin F. Hilbun would not permit the team to participate in the tournament where they would face African-American players.

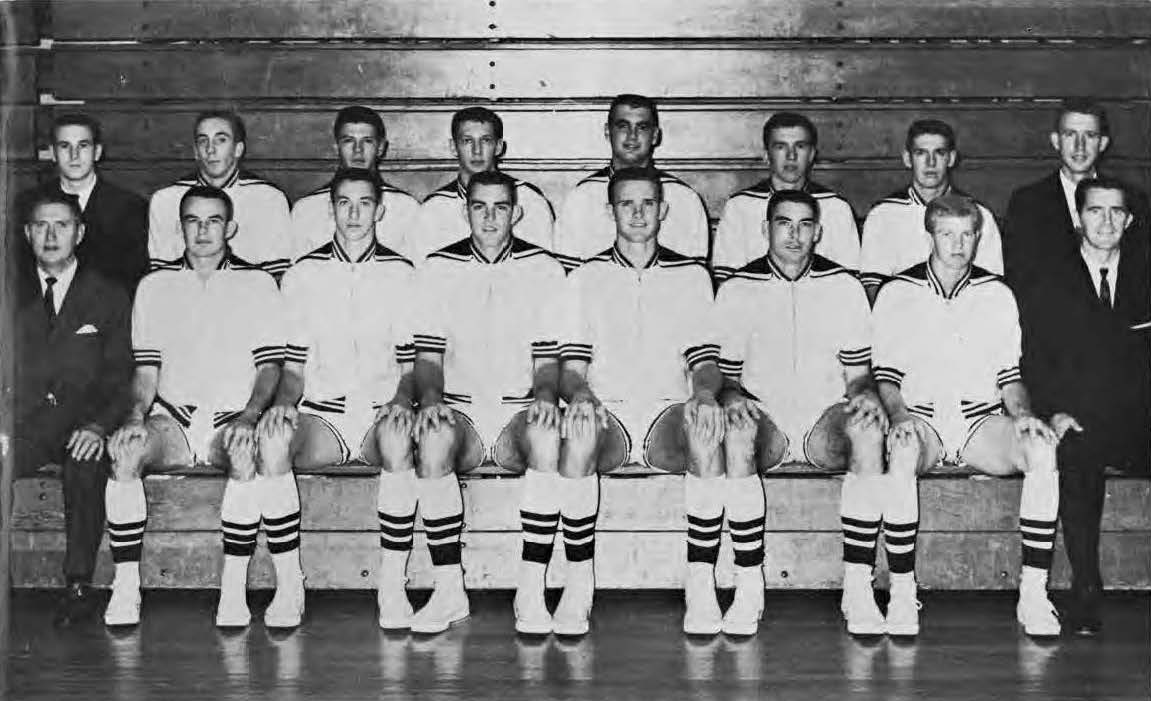
The 1963 team

Year	Seed	Round	Opponent	Result
1963		Sweet Sixteen; Regional 3rd Place Game	Loyola–Chicago; Bowling Green	L 51–61; W 65–60
1991	#5	Round of 64	#12 Eastern Michigan	L 56–76
1995	#5	Round of 64; Round of 32; Sweet Sixteen	#12 Santa Clara #4 Utah #1 UCLA	W 75–67; W 78–64; L 67–86
1996	#5	Round of 64; Round of 32; Sweet Sixteen; Elite Eight; Final Four	#12 VCU #13 Princeton #1 Connecticut #2 Cincinnati #4 Syracuse	W 58–51; W 63–41; W 60–55; W 73–63; L 69–77
2002	#3	Round of 64; Round of 32	#14 McNeese State #6 Texas	W 70–58; L 64–68
2003	#5	Round of 64	#12 Butler	L 46–47
2004	#2	Round of 64; Round of 32	#15 Monmouth #7 Xavier	W 85–52; L 74–89
2005	#9	Round of 64; Round of 32	#8 Stanford #1 Duke	W 93–70; L 55–63
2008	#8	Round of 64; Round of 32	#9 Oregon #1 Memphis	W 76–69; L 74–77
2009	#13	Round of 64	#4 Washington	L 58–71
2019	#5	Round of 64	#12 Liberty	L 76–80
2023	#11	First Four	#11 Pittsburgh	L 59–60
2024	#8	Round of 64	#9 Michigan State	L 51–69
2025	#8	Round of 64	#9 Baylor	L 72–75

=== NIT results ===
The Bulldogs have appeared in the National Invitation Tournament (NIT) 11 times. Their combined record is 13–11.

Year	Round	Opponent	Result
1979	First Round	Alcorn State	L 78–80
1990	First Round; Second Round	Baylor; New Orleans	W 84–75; L 60–65
1994	First Round	Kansas State	L 69–78
1999	First Round	Colorado State	L 56–69
2001	First Round; Second Round; Quarterfinals	Southern Miss; Pittsburgh; Tulsa	W 75–68; W 66–61; L 75–77
2007	First Round; Second Round; Quarterfinals; Semifinals	Mississippi Valley State; Bradley; Florida State; West Virginia	W 82–63; W 101–72; W 86–71; L 62–63
2010	First Round; Second Round	Jackson State; North Carolina	W 81–67; L 74–76
2012	First Round	Massachusetts	L 96–101 ^{2OT}
2018	First Round; Second Round; Quarterfinals; Semifinals	Nebraska; Baylor; Louisville; Penn State	W 66–59; W 78–77; W 79–56; L 60–75
2021	First Round; Quarterfinals; Semifinals; Finals	Saint Louis; Richmond; Louisiana Tech; Memphis	W 74–68; W 68–67; W 84–61; L 64–77
2022	First Round	Virginia	L 57–60

== Awards ==
=== NCAA Defensive Player of the Year ===
Player	Year
Jarvis Varnado	2010

=== SEC Coach of the Year ===
Coach	Year
Babe McCarthy	1961, 1962, 1963
Kermit Davis Sr	1971
Ron Greene	1978
Bob Boyd	1985
Richard Williams	1991, 1995
Rick Stansbury	2004

=== SEC Player of the Year ===
Player	Year
Jim Ashmore	1957
Bailey Howell	1958, 1959
W.D. "Red" Stroud	1962
Jeff Malone	1983
Lawrence Roberts	2004

=== SEC Defensive Player of the Year ===
Player	Year
Jarvis Varnado	2008, 2009, 2010

=== Howell Trophy Award winners ===
Player	Year
Lawrence Roberts	2005
Jamont Gordon	2008
Jarvis Varnado	2009, 2010
Arnett Moultrie	2012
Quinndary Weatherspoon	2018, 2019
Reggie Perry	2020
Iverson Molinar	2022
Tolu Smith	2023
Josh Hubbard	2024, 2025

=== Retired numbers ===
Mississippi State has retired one jersey number for Bailey Howell, doing so on February 7, 2009 at the Coliseum. Mississippi State has also honored two others with honorary banners.

Mississippi State Bulldogs retired numbers
No.	Player	Pos.	Career	No. ret.	Ref.
52	Bailey Howell	SF / PF	1957–1959	2009	

=== Honored jerseys ===
Player	Pos.	Tenure
Babe McCarthy	Head coach	1955–1965
Jack Cristil	Voice of the Bulldogs	1953–2011

== See also ==
- Mississippi State Bulldogs men's basketball statistical leaders
