= Ashmore, Texas =

Unincorporated community in Texas, US

Ashmore
- Ghost town
- Location in Texas
- Coordinates: 32.9153722°N 102.2785117°W
- Country: United States
- State: Texas
- County: Gaines
- Elevation: 3,166 ft (965 m)

Ashmore is an unincorporated community in Gaines County, Texas, United States. Situated on Farm to Market Road 403 and Texas State Highway 83, its post office was established after 1913, and operated until closing in 1948. Its namesake was a local land developer. In 1939, it was surveyed by Coleman L. Henson. A school opened in 1923, which was consolidated with Loop Independent School District in 1937. As of 1990, 25 people lived in Ashmore, the same as in 1980.
