= Ashmore =

Village in Dorset, England

Coordinates: 50.9598°N 2.12536°W

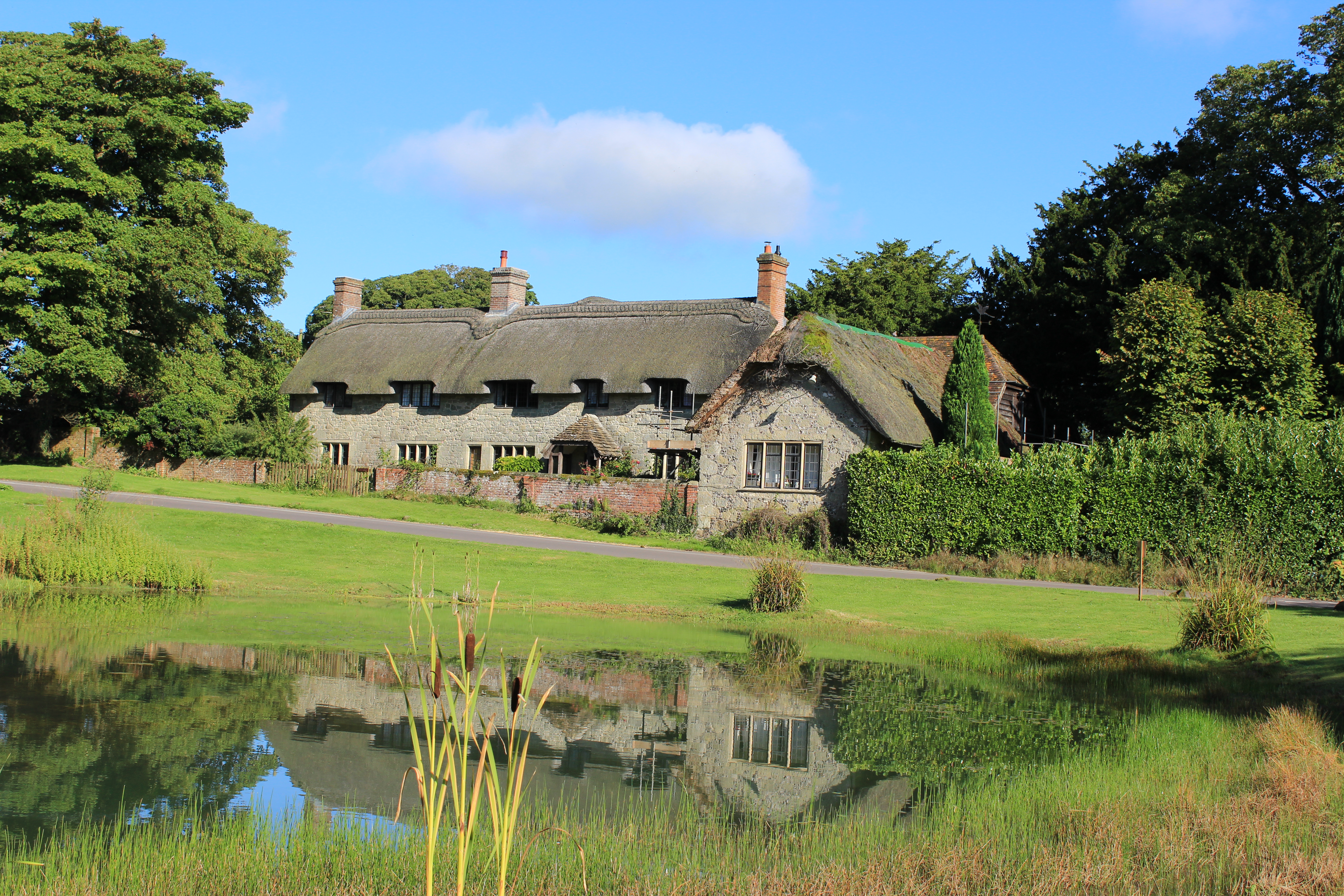
- Ashmore village pond

- Location within Dorset
- Population: 176 (2021 census)
- OS grid reference: ST912178
  - London: 116 mi (187 km)
- Civil parish: Ashmore
- Unitary authority: Dorset
- Ceremonial county: Dorset
- Region: South West
- Country: England
- Sovereign state: United Kingdom
- Post town: Salisbury
- Postcode district: SP5
- Dialling code: 01725
- Police: Dorset
- Fire: Dorset and Wiltshire
- Ambulance: South Western
- UK Parliament: North Dorset

'The Stag's Head' a thatched house in Ashmore

Ashmore is a village and civil parish in Dorset, England, 20 miles (32 kilometres) southwest of Salisbury. In the 2021 census the parish had a population of 176. It has a church and several stone cottages and farms, many with thatched roofs.

The village is the highest in the county. It is centred on a circular pond, or "mere", which gave the village its original name of "Ash-mere". There are grounds for believing Ashmore to be a Romano-British village which has survived without a break to the present day.

== History ==
Three round barrows have been found in the parish: two barrows south of the village near Well Bottom, and one west of the village near the boundary with the village of Fontmell Magna; this latter barrow was excavated in the 19th century and bones were recovered. Ashmore may have been the site of a Neolithic market place or settlement.

The Roman road from Bath to Badbury Rings passes through the east of the parish. The situation of the village is similar to Romano-British sites in the area, and there may have been a military camp and trading post in the area.

In 1086, Ashmore was recorded in the Domesday Book as "Aisemare"; it had 24 households, 7 ploughlands and 10 acres (4 hectares) of meadow. It was in Cranborne Hundred and had a value of £15 to the lord of the manor, who was King William.

Until 1859, Ashmore had an open field system; the three fields—North Field to the north, and Sandpit Fields and Broadridge to the south—were roughly equal in size and covered an area of 380 acres (150 ha). At the same time there was also a considerable area of enclosed fields, covering 240 acres (97 ha) in 1590.

=== Ashmore as an ancient continuously inhabited village ===
In his pioneering work The Making of the English Landscape (1955), historian W.G. Hoskins wrote that, although "It yet remains to be proved that there is any village in England which has been continuously inhabited since Celtic times", certain "exciting clues" led him to believe Ashmore was such a place.

Hoskins noted that Ashmore lies in an area thickly studded with Romano-British remains. It is a hilltop village, a fact "particularly suggestive of great antiquity". Furthermore, it was too far from the river valleys for it to be squeezed out by the Early English settlers, who would have let it be.

For Hoskins, a telling clue was the settlement's ancient nucleus: the village pond. Such embanked ponds may go back to "the beginning of the Christian era or a little earlier". The parish church lies some distance from the pond, on the outskirts of the village, suggesting that Christianity was a relative latecomer. "Ashmore may well be a Romano-British village which has survived without a break to the present day".

== Geography ==
Ashmore parish is situated on the hills of Cranborne Chase 4 1/2 mi (7 km) southeast of Shaftesbury and 7 mi (11 km) north of Blandford Forum. The underlying geology is chalk, overlain by clay-with-flints in the south and southeast. The village, which at 700 ft (210 m) above sea level is the highest in Dorset, is sited on a spur of land between dry valleys which drain south and southwest. All of Ashmore parish is within the Cranborne Chase and West Wiltshire Downs Area of Outstanding Natural Beauty (AONB).

The nearest rail link is 7 mi (11 km) from the village at Tisbury railway station and the nearest air link (Bournemouth Airport) is 18 mi (29 km) away.

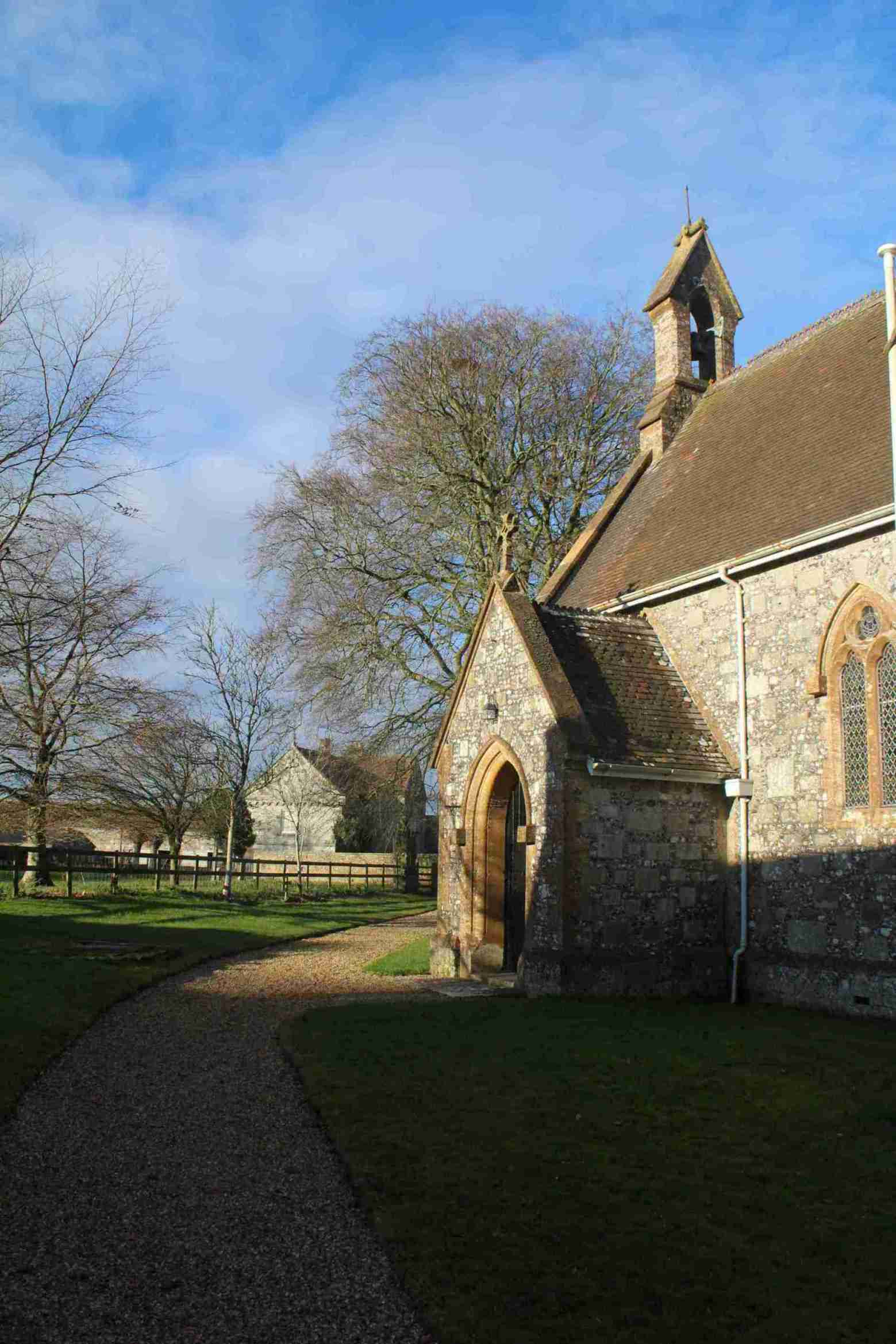
Ashmore St Nicholas church

== Church and Chapel ==
The parish church of St. Nicholas is about 100 metres west of the village pond, west of High Street. Its chancel arch is said to date from the 13th century and it was rebuilt in 1874. On the opposite side of the High Street is a Wesleyan chapel which dates from 1855.

== Demography ==
In the first national census in 1891 the village had a population of 228.

Census population of Ashmore parish
Census	Population	Female	Male	Households	Source
1921	192				
1931	198				
1951	173				
1961	156				
1971	140				
1981	160				
1991	160				
2001	162	77	85	76	
2011	188	101	87	87	
2021	176	98	78	87	

== Culture ==
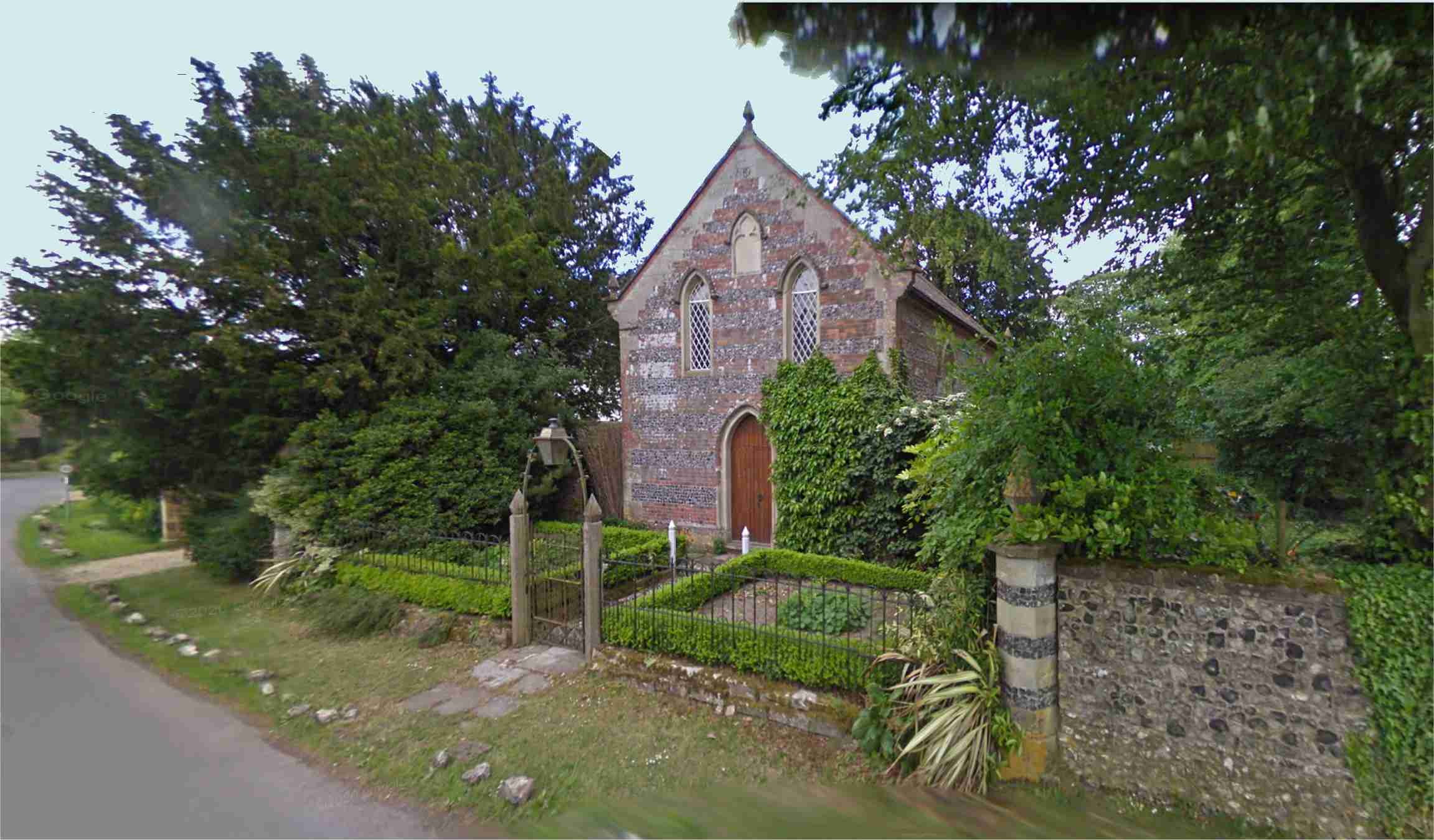
Ashmore Wesleyan chapel

In midsummer a celebration known as 'Filly Loo' (or 'Filleigh Loo') takes place around Ashmore pond, with a Green Man, country dancing, morris dancers and live music. The event's ancient origins are mysterious but may have pagan influences; theories include that it celebrated either the pond's constancy as a water supply, the summer solstice, or the end of the cultivated filbert (hazelnut) harvest. The meaning of the name 'Filly Loo' has also attracted more than one explanation, including that it is West Country dialect for 'uproar', a corruption of the French 'La Fille de l'Eau', ('maiden of the water'), or a corruption of 'Filbert Louis', a nickname of Louis Rideout, one of the historical instigators of the event. The event was revived in 1956 as a folk dance festival, and takes place on the Friday night nearest to Midsummer Day or the Feast of St. John the Baptist.

In 1969, "The Little School by the Duck Pond", was an edition of Terence Carroll's BBC documentary series "Gone Tomorrow" about a vanishing Britain; it featured the village school in Ashmore, then one of the last in Britain.
