= Jim Ashmore =

American basketball player (1935–2023)

Personal information
- Born: May 14, 1935 New Market, Missouri, U.S.
- Died: December 15, 2023 (aged 88)
- Listed height: 6 ft 0 in (1.83 m)
- Listed weight: 165 lb (75 kg)

Career information
- High school: Forest (Forest, Mississippi)
- College: Mississippi State (1954–1957)
- NBA draft: 1957: 4th round, 32nd overall pick
- Drafted by: Boston Celtics
- Playing career: 1957–1960
- Position: Guard

Career history
- 1957–1960: Denver-Chicago Truckers

Career highlights
- Third-team All-American – AP (1957); 2× First-team All-SEC (1956, 1957); AAU All-American (1958)
- Stats at Basketball Reference

James Ashmore (May 14, 1935 – December 15, 2023) was an American basketball player.

== Playing career ==
Ashmore attended Mississippi State University (MSU) from 1954 to 1957 after growing up in New Market, Missouri. He played on the MSU basketball team and was notable for being Mississippi's first college basketball player to score more than 1,000 career points, scoring a total of 1,918 points. In 1957, Ashmore scored 45 points in a single game. He made 76.6% of his free throws in his 1956–57 season.

From 1957 to 1960 Ashmore played for the Denver-Chicago Truckers of the National Industrial Basketball League.

== Death ==
Ashmore died on December 15, 2023, at the age of 88.

== Honors ==
- Ashmore was honored as a Converse and Helms Foundation All-American in 1956–1957.
- Ashmore was inducted into the Mississippi Sports Hall of Fame in 1983.
