= Deaths in March 1996 =

The following is a list of notable deaths in March 1996.

Entries for each day are listed alphabetically by surname. A typical entry lists information in the following sequence:

- Name, age, country of citizenship at birth, subsequent country of citizenship (if applicable), reason for notability, cause of death (if known), and reference.

== March 1996 ==
=== 1 ===
- Marie-Hélène de Rothschild, 68, French socialite.
- Vergílio Ferreira, 80, Portuguese writer, essayist, and professor.
- David Gebhard, 68, American architectural historian.
- Khan Abdul Ghani Khan, 82, Pakistani poet, artist, writer and politician.
- Susie Sharp, 88, American jurist and first female chief justice of the North Carolina Supreme Court.
- Don Smith, 75, American basketball player (Minneapolis Lakers).
- Thorleif Vangen, 75, Norwegian Olympic cross-country skier (1948).
- Ng Wui, 82, Hong Kong film director, writer and actor.

=== 2 ===
- Jacobo Majluta Azar, 61, Vice President of the Dominican Republic, lung cancer.
- Célestin Delmer, 89, French football player.
- Naseem Hijazi, 81, Pakistani writer.
- José López Rubio, 92, Spanish film director.
- Lyle Talbot, 94, American actor, heart failure.
- Notable Brazilians killed in the 1996 Madrid Taxi Aéreo Learjet 25 crash:
  - Dinho, 24, vocalist and songwriter (Mamonas Assassinas).
  - Bento Hinoto, 25, guitarist (Mamonas Assassinas).
  - Júlio Rasec, 28, keyboardist (Mamonas Assassinas).
  - Samuel Reoli, 22, bassist (Mamonas Assassinas).
  - Sérgio Reoli, 26, drummer (Mamonas Assassinas).

=== 3 ===
- Marguerite Duras, 81, French writer and film director, esophageal cancer.
- Randolph Harding, 81, Canadian politician, member of the House of Commons of Canada (1968-1974).
- Walter Kaaden, 76, German engineer.
- John Krol, 85, American catholic cardinal.
- Léo Malet, 86, French writer.
- Meyer Schapiro, 91, American historian of Art.
- Alfred Wilmore, 71, American baseball player.
- Milt Woodard, 84, American sports writer and sport executive.

=== 4 ===
- Berenger Bradford, 83, British Army officer.
- Ted Cordner, 77, Australian rules football player.
- Enrico Cucchi, 30, Italian football player, cancer.
- Minnie Pearl, 83, American comedian and country singer, stroke.
- John Sauer, 70, American gridiron football player, coach, and broadcaster.

=== 5 ===
- Khondaker Mostaq Ahmad, 78, Bangladeshi politician and President of Bangladesh.
- Whit Bissell, 86, American actor (The Magnificent Seven, Creature from the Black Lagoon, The Time Machine), Parkinson's disease.
- Joshua Compston, 25, British art curator, drugs overdose.
- Herb Hall, 88, American musician.
- Galina Kravchenko, 91, Soviet/Russian actress.
- José Santacruz Londoño, 52, Colombian drug trafficker, homicide.
- Pithapuram Nageswara Rao, 65, Indian singer.
- Fritz Huschke von Hanstein, 85, German racecar driver.

=== 6 ===
- Jack Abel, 68, American comic book artist (Superman, Hulk, The Tomb of Dracula).
- Simon Cadell, 45, British actor (Hi-de-Hi!, Life Without George, Watership Down), lung cancer.
- Stuart Cartwright, 76, Australian rules footballer.
- Jurandir de Freitas, 55, Brazilian football player.
- Douglas Jay, Baron Jay, 88, British politician.
- José de Magalhães Pinto, 86, Brazilian lawyer, economist, banker and politician.
- Paula Winslowe, 85, American actress (Our Miss Brooks, The Adventures of Ozzie and Harriet, Bambi).
- Zdeněk Škrland, 82, Czechoslovak/Czech canoeist and Olympian (1936).

=== 7 ===
- Pinchas Menachem Alter, 69, Polish Hasidic rabbi.
- Jacques Bobet, 76, French filmmaker.
- Alf Copsey, 75, Australian rules footballer.
- Willie Fraser, 67, Scottish football player.

=== 8 ===
- John Christensen, 80, Danish Olympic swimmer (1936).
- "Mad Jack" Churchill, 89, British Army officer and master archer.
- Bill Graber, 85, American pole vaulter and Olympian (1932, 1936).
- Bill Nicholson, 81, American baseball player (Philadelphia Athletics, Chicago Cubs, Philadelphia Phillies).
- Werner Schlichting, 91, German art director.
- Carlo Vitale, 93, Italian painter.

=== 9 ===
- Ronald Ernest Aitchison, 74, Australian physicist and electronics engineer.
- Akhtar-Ul-Iman, 80, Indian Urdu poet and screenwriter.
- Mohammed al-Ghazali, 78, Egyptian Islamic cleric and scholar.
- George Burns, 100, American comedian and actor (The George Burns and Gracie Allen Show, The Sunshine Boys, Oh, God!), Oscar winner (1976), heart failure.
- Merle Eugene Curti, 98, American historian.
- Imre Kovács, 74, Hungarian football player and Olympian (1952).
- Alberto Pellegrino, 65, Italian Olympic fencer (1956, 1960, 1964).
- Richard M. Powers, 75, American science fiction illustrator.
- Alfredo Scherer, 93, German-Brazilian catholic cardinal.
- Ollie Walsh, 58, Irish hurler and hurling manager.

=== 10 ===
- Jean Desgranges, 66, French footballer.
- Hoàng Xuân Hãn, 88, Vietnamese professor of mathematics, linguist, and historian.
- Ross Hunter, 75, American film and television producer, and actor, cancer.
- Marc de Jonge, 47, French actor, traffic collision.
- Butch Laswell, 37, American motorcycle stunt rider, motorcycle accident.
- Gyula Nagy, 71, Hungarian football player and manager.

=== 11 ===
- Elio Filippo Accrocca, 72, Italian poet, author, and translator.
- Granville Beynon, 81, Welsh physicist.
- Paul Crossley, 47, English football player, heart attack.
- Vince Edwards, 67, American actor (Ben Casey, The Devil's Brigade, The Killing), pancreatic cancer.
- Ludwig Fellermaier, 65, German politician.
- Richard G. Folsom, 89, American mechanical engineer.
- Biljana Jovanović, 43, Serbian author, peace activist and feminist.
- Rex E. Lee, 61, American lawyer, academic and Solicitor General of the United States, pancreatic cancer.
- Charles Oatley, 92, British physicist and electrical engineer.
- Thorleif Olsen, 74, Norwegian football player and Olympian (1952).
- Evangeline Walton, 88, American writer.

=== 12 ===
- Bob Forte, 73, American gridiron football player (Green Bay Packers).
- Marte Harell, 89, Austrian actress.
- Otto Møller Jensen, 55, Danish actor.
- Eigil Knuth, 92, Danish explorer, archaeologist, sculptor and writer.
- Gyula Kállai, 85, Hungarian politician.
- Joe Sankey, 82, Australian cricketer.

=== 13 ===
- Henriette Alimen, 95, French paleontologist and geologist.
- Hsu Ching-chung, 88, Taiwanese politician.
- Ted Fetter, 89, American lyricist.
- Lucio Fulci, 68, Italian film director, screenwriter, producer, and actor, diabetes.
- Sándor Gellér, 70, Hungarian football player.
- Peer Guldbrandsen, 83, Danish film director.
- Shafi Inamdar, 50, Indian actor.
- Krzysztof Kieślowski, 54, Polish film director and screenwriter (Three Colours trilogy, The Double Life of Veronique, Dekalog), heart attack.
- Weston La Barre, 84, American anthropologist.
- Marcelle Mercenier, 75, Belgian piano player.
- Max Messner, 57, American football player (Detroit Lions, New York Giants, Pittsburgh Steelers).
- Rudolf Rieger, 80, Austrian Olympic ski jumper (1936).
- Emilie Schenkl, 85, Austrian Hindu convert and partner of Indian nationalist Subhas Chandra Bose.
- Robert Tetrick, 69, American actor.
- Dick West, 80, American baseball player (Cincinnati Reds).

=== 14 ===
- Dewi Bebb, 57, Welsh rugby player, broadcaster and journalist.
- Wang Luobin, 82, Chinese musician, cancer.
- Lucille H. McCollough, 90, American politician, complications from a stroke.
- Andreas Münzer, 31, Austrian bodybuilder, organ failure.
- Dean Prater, 37, American gridiron football player (Kansas City Chiefs, Buffalo Bills), drowned.
- Maj Sønstevold, 78, Swedish composer.

=== 15 ===
- Gad al-Haq, 78, Egyptian Grand Imam of al-Azhar, heart attack.
- Ed Beach, 67, American basketball player (Minneapolis Lakers, Tri-Cities Blackhawks) .
- Lucien Boekmans, 73, Belgian Olympic field hockey player (1948).
- Helen Chadwick, 42, British sculptor, photographer and installation artist, heart attack.
- Harold Courlander, 87, American anthropologist.
- Roswell Gilpatric, 89, American lawyer and Deputy Secretary of Defense.
- Homer Groening, 76, Canadian-American filmmaker, father of the Simpsons creator Matt Groening, cancer.
- Cheng Heng, 80, Cambodian politician.
- Dennis Johnson, 44, American football player (Washington Redskins, Buffalo Bills).
- Wolfgang Koeppen, 89, German writer.
- Rita de Luna, 66, Guatemalan Olympic equestrian (1976).
- Francis Joseph Murray, 85, American mathematician.
- Robert Pearce, 88, American wrestler and Olympic champion (1932).
- Olga Rudge, 100, American musician.

=== 16 ===
- Charlie Barnett, 41, American actor (Miami Vice) and comedian, AIDS-related complications.
- Ray S. Cline, 77, American government official, Alzheimer's disease.
- Des Fothergill, 75, Australian rules football player and cricket player.
- David Gordon, 51, American economist.
- Evan Green, 65, Australian journalist.
- Dennis Jennings, 85, English football player.
- Edmond Weiskopf, 84, Hungarian-born French footballer.

=== 17 ===
- Anil Chatterjee, 66, Indian actor.
- René Clément, 82, French film director and screenwriter.
- Thomas O. Enders, 64, American diplomat.
- Elsa Respighi, 101, Italian composer.
- Nils Sköld, 74, Swedish Army lieutenant-general.
- Terry Stafford, 54, American singer and songwriter, organ dysfunction.
- Susan Wrigglesworth, 41, British Olympic fencer (1972, 1976, 1980).

=== 18 ===
- Angelico Chavez, 85, American Friar Minor, priest, historian, author, poet and painter.
- Odysseas Elytis, 84, Greek poet and art critic, heart attack.
- Jacquetta Hawkes, 85, British archaeologist.
- Enrique Jordá, 84, Spanish-American conductor.
- Jaroslav Knotek, 83, Czech Olympic hammer thrower (1936, 1948).
- Maria Teresa Pelegrí i Marimón, 88, Spanish composer.
- Niní Marshall, 92, Argentine comedian.
- Robert van der Veen, 89, Dutch Olympic field hockey player (1928).
- Shin Yung-kyoo, 53, North Korean football player.

=== 19 ===
- Virginia Henderson, 98, American nurse, researcher, and author.
- Steinþór Jakobsson, 64, Icelandic Olympic alpine skier (1956).
- Chen Jingrun, 62, Chinese mathematician, pneumonia.
- W. H. Murray, 83, Scottish mountaineer and writer.
- Colin Pittendrigh, 77, British-American chronobiologist.
- Alan Ridout, 61, British composer and teacher.
- Walter Schönrock, 83, German Olympic long-distance runner (1936).
- Günther Schütt, 77, German Olympic rower (1952).
- Walter S. Sullivan, 78, American science reporter and author.
- Lise Østergaard, 71, Danish psychologist and minister.

=== 20 ===
- Claude Bourdet, 86, French politician and writer.
- Hans Conzett, 80, Swiss publisher and politician.
- Albert Ganzenmüller, 91, German politician.
- Werner Loeckle, 79, German Olympic rower (1936).
- Jim Pendleton, 72, American baseball player.
- John Vesser, 95, American football player (Chicago Cardinals), and coach.

=== 21 ===
- Walter Bietila, 80, American Olympic ski jumper (1936, 1948).
- Richard Leslie Hill, 95, English civil servant and historian.
- Robert B. Mautz, 81, American lawyer, law professor, and university administrator.
- Sverre Sørsdal, 95, Norwegian Olympic boxer (1920, 1924, 1928).
- Nikolai Usenko, 71, Russian Ryadovoy and Hero of the Soviet Union for his actions during WWII.

=== 22 ===
- Marcel Gleyre, 85, American Olympic gymnast (1932).
- Ron Hayward, 78, British politician.
- Claude Mauriac, 81, French writer.
- Don Murray, 50, American drummer, complications following ulcer surgery.
- Václav Nelhýbel, 76, Czech composer.
- Robert F. Overmyer, 59, American test pilot and astronaut (STS-5, STS-51-B), aviation accident.
- Pete Whisenant, 66, American baseball player.
- Billy Williamson, 71, American Rock and roll musician.

=== 23 ===
- Roderic H. Davison, 78, American historian of the Middle East.
- François Fontaine, 78, French civil servant and writer.
- Margit Manstad, 93, Swedish actress.
- Pete Martin, 76, Canadian football player.
- J. D. "Jay" Miller, 73, American musician.
- Leo Monaghan, 79, Australian rules footballer.
- Jacques Toja, 66, French actor, cancer.

=== 24 ===
- Aldon J. Anderson, 79, American district judge (United States District Court for the District of Utah).
- Lola Beltrán, 64, Mexican singer, actress, and television presenter, pulmonary embolism.
- Idilio Cei, 58, Italian football player.
- John Gerstner, 81, American theologian.
- Étienne Hajdú, 88, French and Hungarian sculptor.
- Joseph Jessop, 97, American Olympic sailor (1932).
- Liam O'Brien, 83, American screenwriter and television producer, heart attack.
- Ray Pepper, 90, American baseball player (St. Louis Cardinals, St. Louis Browns).
- Jean-Claude Piumi, 55, French football player.
- Jerry Robertson, 52, American baseball player (Montreal Expos, Detroit Tigers), car accident.
- Spartaco Schergat, 75, Italian military frogman during World War II.
- Sarah Thomasson, 70, Swedish alpine skier and Olympian (1952).

=== 25 ===
- Mary Lavin, 83, Irish writer.
- Marvin Albert, 72, American author.
- Dioscoro S. Rabor, 84, Filipino ornithologist, zoologist, and conservationist.
- John Snagge, 91, British reporter, esophageal cancer.

=== 26 ===
- Robert Bradshaw, 41, American figure skater.
- William Harold Collins, 74, American gridiron football player.
- Maurice Gramain, 84, French Olympic fencer (1936, 1948).
- Joseph Kallinger, 60, American serial killer, heart failure.
- Edmund Muskie, 81, American statesman, political leader, and U.S. Secretary of State, heart failure.
- David Packard, 83, American electrical engineer and co-founder, with Bill Hewlett, of Hewlett-Packard.
- David du Plessis, 69, South African Olympic sports shooter (1960).
- Käte Strobel, 88, German politician.
- Elmer Ward, 83, American gridiron football player (Detroit Lions).

=== 27 ===
- Seán Browne, 79, Irish politician.
- Bob Chambers, 90, Canadian artist.
- Peter Chitty, 84, Australian rules footballer.
- Ignace Kowalczyk, 82, French football player.
- André Lefevere, 50, Belgian translator and linguist, leukemia.
- Samuel Schoenbaum, 69, American Shakespearean biographer and scholar, prostate cancer.
- Oliver Seth, 80, American circuit judge (United States Court of Appeals for the Tenth Circuit).
- Charlie Timmons, 79, American gridiron football player (Brooklyn Dodgers).
- Alfred Waterman, 84, English cricketer.

=== 28 ===
- Hans Blumenberg, 75, German philosopher and intellectual historian.
- Mike Davlin, 68, American football player (Washington Redskins).
- Peter Dombrovskis, 51, Australian photographer, heart attack.
- Edith Fowke, 82, Canadian folklorist.
- Shin Kanemaru, 81, Japanese politician, stroke.
- Barbara McLean, 92, American film editor.
- Siegfried Mynhardt, 90, South African actor.
- Donovan Parks, 24, American murder victim.
- Don Ross, 81, American baseball player (Detroit Tigers, Brooklyn Dodgers, Cleveland Indians).
- Ritva Salonen, 60, Finnish Olympic gymnast (1960).

=== 29 ===
- Frank Daniel, 69, Czech director, scriptwriter and university educator, heart attack.
- Bill Goldsworthy, 51, Canadian ice hockey player (Boston Bruins, Minnesota North Stars, New York Rangers), AIDS-related complications.
- Ivan Kalita, 69, Soviet/Russian equestrian and Olympic champion (1960, 1964, 1968, 1972, 1976).
- Charles Merton Merrill, 88, American circuit judge (United States Court of Appeals for the Ninth Circuit).
- Juan Negrón, 66, Puerto Rican US Army soldier and recipient of the Medal of Honor.
- Gordon Pask, 67, British psychologist.
- Helmut von Bockelberg, 84, German politician and tax advisor.

=== 30 ===
- Frederick Miller, 84, British paediatrician.
- Richard Kress, 71, German football player.
- Ryoei Saito, 79, Japanese businessman.
- Bjørn Stiler, 84, Danish Olympic racing cyclist (1936).

=== 31 ===
- Dario Bellezza, 51, Italian poet, author and playwright, AIDS-related complications.
- Nino Borsari, 84, Italian cyclist and Olympian (1932).
- Dante Giacosa, 91, Italian automobile designer and engineer.
- Roy Lyons, 80, Australian rules footballer.
- Delia Magaña, 93, Mexican actress, dancer, and singer, pneumonia.
- Jeffrey Lee Pierce, 37, American singer, songwriter, guitarist and author, cerebral hemorrhage.
