= Athletics at the 1936 Summer Olympics – Men's pole vault =

Men's pole vault at the Games of the XI Olympiad
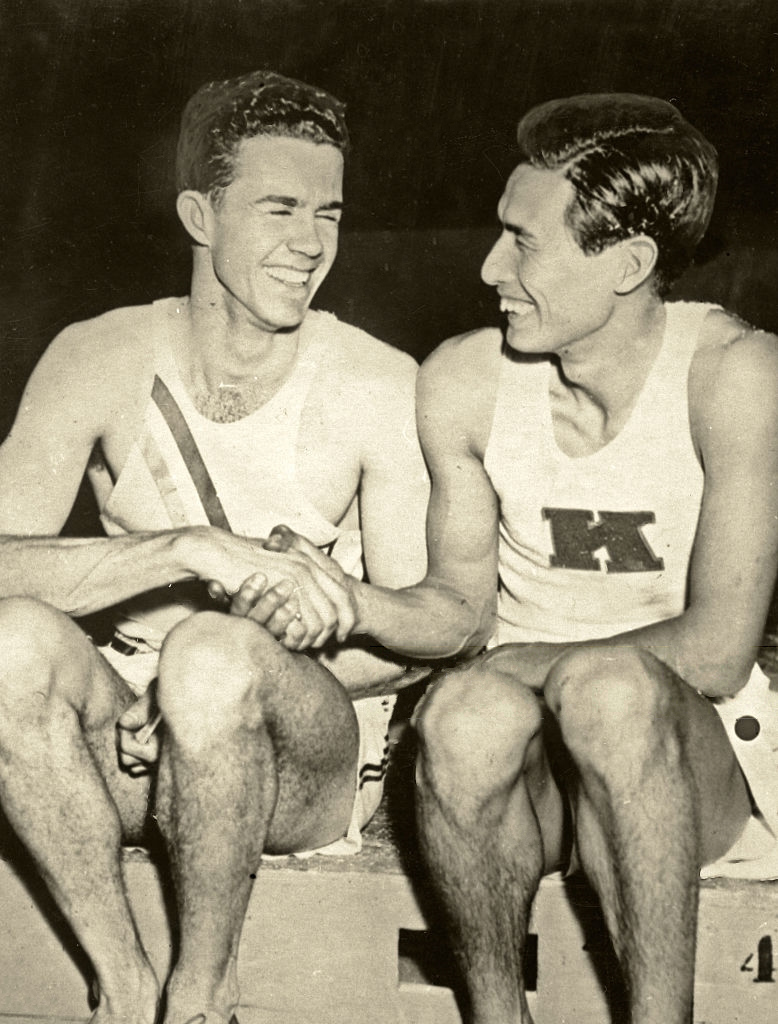
- Earle Meadows and Sueo Oe
- Venue: Olympiastadion: Berlin, Germany
- Dates: August 5, 1936
- Competitors: 30 from 21 nations
- Winning height: 4.35 OR

Medalists
1st place, gold medalist(s)		Earle Meadows; United States
2nd place, silver medalist(s)		Shuhei Nishida; Japan
3rd place, bronze medalist(s)		Sueo Ōe; Japan

The men's pole vault event was part of the track and field athletics programme at the 1936 Summer Olympics. The competition was held on August 5, 1936. Thirty athletes from 21 nations competed. The maximum number of athletes per nation had been set at 3 since the 1930 Olympic Congress. The final was won by Earle Meadows of the United States. It was the nation's tenth consecutive victory in the men's pole vault.

A three-way tie for second resulted in a jump-off; after American Bill Sefton was eliminated (ending the United States' streak of two or more medals in every pole vault), two Japanese jumpers were left. They refused to compete further, so Japanese officials chose, by fiat, Shuhei Nishida as the silver medalist and Sueo Oe the bronze medalist. After the Games, Nishida and Oe "took their medals, cut them apart, and combined them into a half-silver, half-bronze medal, the only two of their type ever created." In any case, Nishida became the first man to win multiple pole vault medals, as he had previously taken silver in 1932. (The United States had won 25 medals in the event in 10 Games, all by different men.)

== Tie of second and third place ==
Three men tied for second in clearing 4.25 metres: Bill Sefton of the United States and Sueo Ōe and Shuhei Nishida of Japan. The rules at the time used a jump-off rather than countback to break ties. The jump-off started at 4.15 metres. Sefton was unable to clear that height again, while Ōe and Nishida were. Sefton was thus eliminated, at fourth place.

The two Japanese vaulters then refused to further participate in the tie-breaker. The Japanese team was told to make its own decision about who should claim second place and who third. After lengthy discussion, it was agreed that Nishida, who had vaulted 4.25 at his first attempt, should take precedence over Oe, who had needed two attempts at that height (this method would become standard tie-breaking procedure). Upon returning to Japan, they cut their medals in half and fused them to one another so each athlete ended up with a half-silver, half-bronze medal. They became known as “The Medals of Friendship”.

== Background ==
This was the 10th appearance of the event, which is one of 12 athletics events to have been held at every Summer Olympics. The returning vaulters from the 1932 games were silver medalist Shuhei Nishida of Japan and fourth-place finisher Bill Graber of the United States. The American team was favored, with all three (Graber, Bill Sefton, and Earle Meadows) considered approximately equal. All had beaten 1936 AAU champion and world record holder George Varoff in the U.S. trials.

Chile, the Republic of China, Mexico, Peru, South Africa, and Yugoslavia made their first appearance in the event. The United States made its 10th appearance, the only nation to have competed at every Olympic men's pole vault to that point.

== Competition format ==
The competition returned to the two-round format introduced in 1912 (after a one-Games direct final due to scarcity of competitors in 1932), with results cleared between rounds. The official report describes it as a three-round competition, but the "semifinal" and "final" were in effect a single round as results carried forward between them. Vaulters received three attempts at each height.

In the qualifying round, the bar was set at heights including 3.50 metres, 3.70 metres, and 3.80 metres. All vaulters clearing 3.80 metres advanced to the final.

In the final, the bar was set at heights including 3.40 metres, 3.60 metres, 3.80 metres, 4.00 metres, 4.15 metres, 4.25 metres, 4.35 metres, and 4.45 metres.

== Records ==
These were the standing world and Olympic records (in metres) prior to the 1936 Summer Olympics. Varoff's world record had not yet been ratified; Keith Brown's 4.39 metres was still official at the time.

World record	George Varoff (USA)	4.43	Princeton, United States	4 July 1936
Olympic record	Bill Miller (USA)	4.315	Los Angeles, United States	3 August 1932

Earle Meadows set a new Olympic record by clearing 4.35 metres.

== Schedule ==
The "semifinal" was in effect just the first half of the final.

Date	Time	Round
Wednesday, 5 August 1936	10:30; 16:00; 19:00	Qualifying; Semifinal; Final

== Results ==
Key

- o = Height cleared
- x = Height failed
- – = Height passed
- r = Retired
- SB = Season's best
- PB = Personal best
- NR = National record
- AR = Area record
- OR = Olympic record
- WR = World record
- WL = World lead
- NM = No mark
- DNS = Did not start
- DQ = Disqualified

=== Qualifying ===
Only the 3.80 metres jump sequences for those who advanced are available.

Rank	Athlete	Nation	3.80	Height	Notes
1	Earle Meadows	United States	o	3.80	Q
1	Shuhei Nishida	Japan	o	3.80	Q
1	Sueo Ōe	Japan	o	3.80	Q
1	Bill Graber	United States	o	3.80	Q
1	Kiyoshi Adachi	Japan	o	3.80	Q
1	Syl Apps	Canada	o	3.80	Q
1	Péter Bácsalmási	Hungary	o	3.80	Q
1	Danilo Innocenti	Italy	o	3.80	Q
1	Jan Korejs	Czechoslovakia	o	3.80	Q
1	Bo Ljungberg	Sweden	o	3.80	Q
1	Alfred Proksch	Austria	o	3.80	Q
1	Wilhelm Schneider	Poland	o	3.80	Q
1	Viktor Zsuffka	Hungary	o	3.80	Q
1	Andries du Plessis	South Africa	o	3.80	Q
1	Ernst Larsen	Denmark	o	3.80	Q
1	Julius Müller	Germany	o	3.80	Q
1	Miroslav Klásek	Czechoslovakia	o	3.80	Q
1	Pierre Ramadier	France	o	3.80	Q
1	Siegfried Schulz	Germany	o	3.80	Q
1	Adolfo Schlegel	Chile	o	3.80	Q
1	Josef Haunzwickel	Austria	xo	3.80	Q
1	Dick Webster	Great Britain	xo	3.80	Q
1	André Crépin	France	xxo	3.80	Q
1	Fu Baolu	Republic of China	xxo	3.80	Q
1	Bill Sefton	United States	xxo	3.80	Q
26	Aulis Reinikka	Finland	xxx	3.70	
26	Eevald Äärma	Estonia	xxx	3.70	
26	Jaša Bakov	Yugoslavia	xxx	3.70	
29	Guillermo Chirichigno	Peru	—N/a	3.50	
29	Rigoberto Pérez	Mexico	—N/a	3.50	

=== Final ===
Rank	Athlete	Nation	3.40	3.60	3.80	4.00	4.15	4.25	4.35	4.45	Height	Notes
1st place, gold medalist(s)	Earle Meadows	United States	—	o	—	o	o	xo	xo	xxx	4.35	OR
2nd place, silver medalist(s)	Shuhei Nishida	Japan	—	—	o	o	o	o	xxx	—N/a	4.25	
3rd place, bronze medalist(s)	Sueo Ōe	Japan	—	—	o	o	o	xo	xxx	—N/a	4.25	
4	Bill Sefton	United States	—	o	—	o	xxo	o	xxx	—N/a	4.25	
5	Bill Graber	United States	—	o	—	o	xo	xxx	—N/a		4.15	
6	Kiyoshi Adachi	Japan	—	o	o	o	xxx	—N/a			4.00	
6	Syl Apps	Canada	—	o	o	o	xxx	—N/a			4.00	
6	Péter Bácsalmási	Hungary	—	o	o	xxo	xxx	—N/a			4.00	
6	Josef Haunzwickel	Austria	—	o	o	xo	xxx	—N/a			4.00	
6	Danilo Innocenti	Italy	—	o	o	xo	xxx	—N/a			4.00	
6	Jan Korejs	Czechoslovakia	—	xo	o	xxo	xxx	—N/a			4.00	
6	Bo Ljungberg	Sweden	—	o	o	o	xxx	—N/a			4.00	
6	Alfred Proksch	Austria	—	o	o	o	xxx	—N/a			4.00	
6	Wilhelm Schneider	Poland	—	—	o	o	xxx	—N/a			4.00	
6	Dick Webster	Great Britain	—	o	o	o	xxx	—N/a			4.00	
6	Viktor Zsuffka	Hungary	—	o	o	xxo	xxx	—N/a			4.00	
17	Andries du Plessis	South Africa	o	o	o	xxx	—N/a				3.80	
17	Ernst Larsen	Denmark	—	o	o	xxx	—N/a				3.80	
17	Julius Müller	Germany	—	o	o	xxx	—N/a				3.80	
17	Miroslav Klásek	Czechoslovakia	—	o	o	xxx	—N/a				3.80	
17	Fu Baolu	Republic of China	—	o	o	xxx	—N/a				3.80	
17	Pierre Ramadier	France	—	o	o	xxx	—N/a				3.80	
17	Siegfried Schulz	Germany	—	o	o	xxx	—N/a				3.80	
24	Adolfo Schlegel	Chile	—	xo	xxx	—N/a					3.60	
25	André Crépin	France	o	xxx	—N/a						3.40	
