= Bill Sefton =

American pole vaulter (1915–1982)

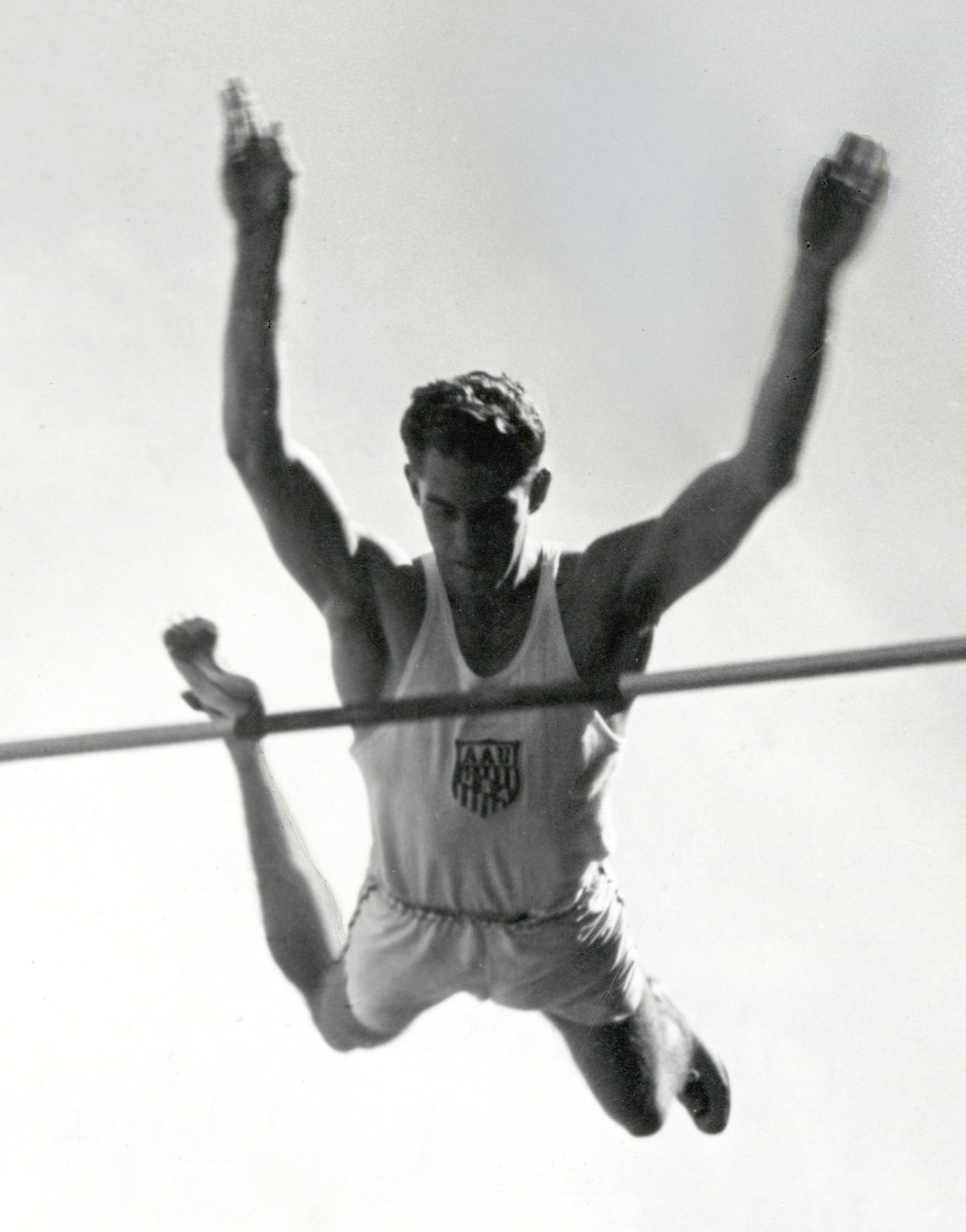
- Bill Sefton in 1935

Personal information
- Born: January 21, 1915 Los Angeles, California, United States
- Died: May 2, 1982 (aged 67) Plano, Texas, United States
- Height: 1.90 m (6 ft 3 in)
- Weight: 82 kg (181 lb)

Sport
- Sport: Pole vault
- Club: USC Trojans, Los Angeles

Achievements and titles
- Olympic finals: 1936

William Healy Sefton (January 21, 1915 – May 2, 1982) was an American pole vaulter. Sefton broke the pole vault world record several times in 1937 and placed fourth in the 1936 Olympics in Berlin.

== Athletic career ==
=== Early career ===
Sefton was a good pole vaulter already in 1932, while still at Polytechnic High School. He vaulted 13 ft 5 1/4 in (4.09 m) for a national high school record and shared first place in the California interscholastic championship meet. In 1934 he vaulted at least 14 ft (4.26 m) on four occasions, clearing 14 ft 1/2 in (4.28 m) at Santa Barbara on April 28, and tied for first at the national junior championships with a new meeting record of 13 ft 6 in (4.11 m).

Sefton and Earle Meadows were teammates at the University of Southern California and collectively known as the "Heavenly Twins". The two tied for first at the 1935 NCAA championship meet, both vaulting 14 ft 1 1/8 in (4.29 m) for a new meeting record as USC won the team title. They also tied at the national championships, both clearing 13 ft 10 3/8 in (4.22 m) to share first place.

=== 1936 ===
Sefton and Meadows tied at the NCAA meet again in 1936, this time vaulting 14 ft 1 3/4 in (4.31 m) to improve their meeting record by a fraction of an inch. At the national championships George Varoff won with a new world record of 14 ft 6 1/2 in (4.43 m) while Sefton vaulted 14 ft (4.26 m) for third. However, the Olympic trials were held separately the following week and there Varoff only placed fourth and was left off the team, while Sefton, Meadows and returning Olympian and USC graduate Bill Graber all cleared 14 ft 3 in (4.34 m) to tie for first. It was the first time one university had swept the three Olympic spots at the trials.

Sefton almost failed to qualify for the Olympic final, missing twice at 3.80 m (12 ft 5 5/8 in) in qualifying but clearing cleanly on his third attempt. In the final Meadows won with an Olympic record of 4.35 m (14 ft 3 1/4 in) while Sefton and two Japanese vaulters, Shuhei Nishida and Sueo Ōe, all cleared 4.25 m (13 ft 11 3/8 in) and had an extra vault as a tie-breaker. Sefton lost the jump-off and thus finished out of the medals in fourth place.

=== 1937 ===
Sefton broke the world record several times in 1937. He first improved it in Los Angeles on April 10, clearing 14 ft 7 3/8 in (4.45 m) to beat Varoff's mark from the previous year. A month later in San Francisco he cleared 14 ft 8 1/2 (4.48 m) in a dual meet against Stanford, but Meadows equaled that height later in the same competition. Finally, in the conference meet on May 29, again in Los Angeles, Sefton vaulted 14 ft 11 in (4.54 m), clearing that height on his first attempt. Meadows, despite missing on his first two attempts, again tied the new record on his third and final try. The two were not able to attempt 15 ft (4.57 m) that day as the standards maxed out at 14 ft 11 in and the bar couldn't be raised any higher. Only these last records were officially ratified by the IAAF.

Sefton finally won outright at the NCAA championships, clearing 14 ft 8 7/8 in (4.49 m) for a meeting record and beating both Varoff and Meadows. It was only in 1951 that Don Laz of Illinois broke that record. Sefton also won the 1937 national title with a leap of 14 ft 7 5/8 in (4.46 m), another meeting record; Dutch Warmerdam, Meadows and Varoff all cleared the same height but missed out on countback.

Records
Preceded by (United States) George Varoff	Men's Pole Vault World Record Holder; April 10, 1937 – April 13, 1940	Succeeded by (United States) Cornelius Warmerdam
