= Bill Graber =

American pole vaulter

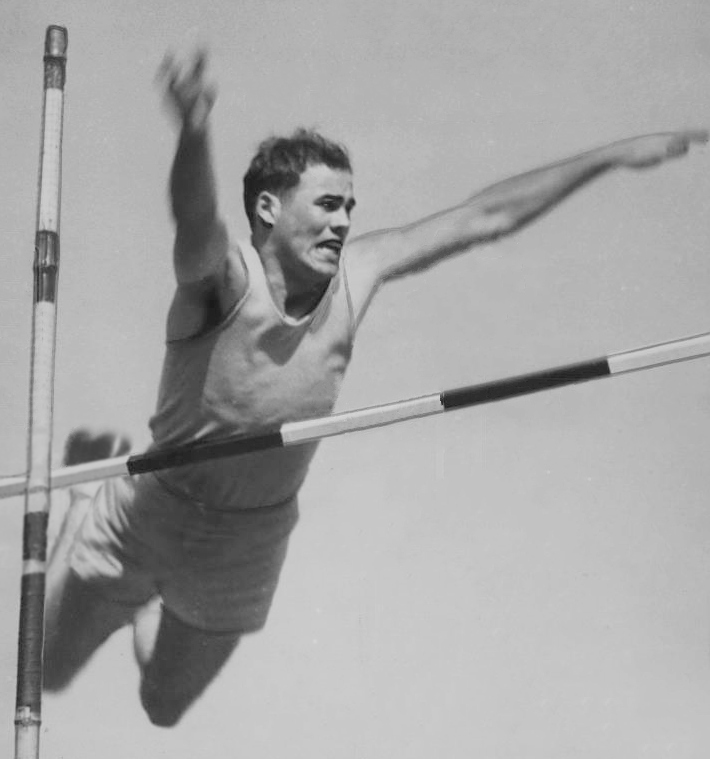
- Graber in 1934

Personal information
- Born: January 21, 1911 Ontario, California, U.S.
- Died: March 8, 1996 (aged 85) San Bernardino, California, U.S.
- Height: 188 cm (6 ft 2 in)
- Weight: 81 kg (179 lb)

Sport
- Sport: Athletics
- Event: Pole vault
- Club: USC Trojans, Los Angeles

Achievements and titles
- Personal best: 4.40 m (1935)

William Noe Graber (January 21, 1911 – March 8, 1996) was an American pole vaulter. He broke the pole vault world record in 1932 and competed at the 1932 and 1936 Olympics, placing fourth and fifth, respectively.

== Athletic career ==
Graber studied at the University of Southern California (USC), where he was coached by Dean Cromwell. As a sophomore in 1931 Graber won the pole vault at the IC4A championships and tied for first at the NCAA championships, helping the USC Trojans to team titles in both meets. At the IC4A meet in Philadelphia men's pole vault was the last event and Graber's meeting record of 14 ft 1/2 in (4.28 m) secured the Trojans a narrow victory over Stanford University. Graber was only the fifth athlete in the world to jump 14 feet or more in a competition, and the only one to do so that year. Graber's NCAA jump of 13 ft 10 5/16 in (4.22 m) was also a meeting record; the Trojans won that team title by a much more comfortable margin, scoring a record 77 1/7 points and beating Ohio State by 46 points.

Graber repeated as IC4A champion 1932, although this time he only tied for first. He was unable to defend his NCAA title as the Trojans didn't compete in that meet. The American team for the Olympics in Los Angeles was selected at the Olympic Trials in Palo Alto, with the top three qualifying. Both Graber and Stanford's Bill Miller cleared 14 ft 1 5/8 in (4.31 m), a fraction of an inch better than Lee Barnes's world record of 14 ft 1 1/2 in (4.30 m). Graber then cleared 14 ft 4 3/8 in (4.37 m) to obliterate the record; he said afterwards "it was the first time this year that I have been able to follow one good vault with another." The record established Graber as the leading favorite for the Olympics, but he underperformed and only jumped 13 ft 7 1/4 in (4.15 m), placing fourth behind Miller, Japan's Shuhei Nishida and the other American entrant, George Jefferson.

Graber won his third IC4A title in 1933 in a five-way tie for first place. He also tied for first place at the NCAA meet, jumping 13 ft 11 1/16 in (4.24 m) to break his own meeting record. In 1934 he was national champion indoors and tied for the title outdoors. He almost broke his own world record in April 1935 at Santa Barbara, clearing a bar supposedly at 14 ft 5 5/8 in (4.41 m), but it was subsequently found that the take-off point had been two inches (5 cm) higher than the point of measurement and the record could not be ratified.

Entering the Olympic year of 1936, Graber was considered a leading candidate for his second Olympic Games. At the Olympic Trials at Randalls Island in New York City he cleared 14 ft 3 in (4.34 m), tying for first place with Bill Sefton and Earle Meadows. Meadows and Sefton both being USC undergraduates, it was the first time in the history of the Trials that one university had claimed the top three. George Varoff, who had been the favorite after breaking the world record the previous week, only cleared 14 ft (4.26 m) and didn't qualify for the team.

Graber was again a leading Olympic favorite, but again he failed to medal; at the Olympics he only managed 13 ft 7 1/4 in (4.15 m) and placed 5th.

Records
Preceded by (Norway) Charles Hoff (professional) (United States) Lee Barnes (amateur)	Men's Pole Vault World Record Holder; July 16, 1932 – June 1, 1935	Succeeded by (United States) Keith Brown
