= Keith Brown (pole vaulter) =

American athlete and politician (1913–1991)

keith Brown
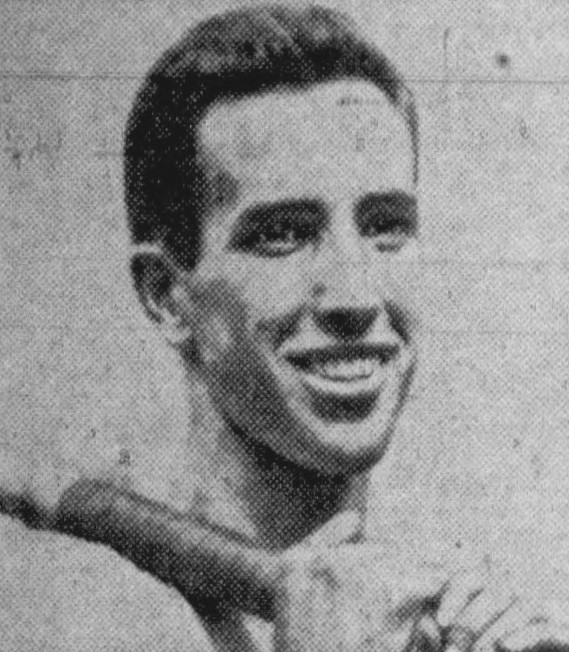
- Brown, circa 1935

Personal information
- Nationality: American
- Born: June, 1913
- Died: July, 1991 (aged 78)

Sport
- Sport: Athletics
- Event: pole vault

Keith Spalding Brown (June 1913 – July 1991) was an American athlete, politician and businessman. He broke the pole vault world record both indoors and outdoors and was also a good high jumper. He later became involved in politics and served as the Republican Party's state chairman in Arizona for two years.

== Athletic career ==
Although Brown had tried pole vaulting early on, he only took it up seriously after being cut from the basketball team of his high school, Phillips Academy in Andover, Massachusetts. In May 1931, he cleared 13 ft 4 5/8 in (4.08 m) at an interscholastic meet at the Harvard Stadium, a new national high school pole vault record. By doing so, he was following in the footsteps of his uncle Bobby Gardner, who in 1912 had become the first jumper to clear 13 feet (3.96 m).

Brown graduated from Phillips Academy in 1931 and went to Yale, which at the time was a top pole vaulting school thanks to its coach A. C. Gilbert. As a freshman in 1932, he jumped 13 ft 10 in (4.21 m) to win the Eastern Olympic Tryouts; at the final Olympic Trials in Palo Alto, he only cleared 13 ft 4 in (4.06 m) and tied for seventh with nine other athletes, failing to qualify for the Olympic team.

Brown helped Yale win the team title at the 1933 IC4A indoor championships. He not only jumped a meet record 13 ft 9 3/4 in (4.21 m) to tie for first in the pole vault with his Yale teammate Wirt Thompson, he also tied George Spitz of the favored New York University for first place in the high jump. At the national indoor championships, Brown shared first place with another Yale teammate, Franklin Pierce, at 13 ft 6 in (4.11 m). He capped his indoor season on March 15, jumping 14 ft 1 3/4 in (4.31 m) at Madison Square Garden for a new indoor world record.

At the 1933 outdoor IC4A meet Brown pulled a tendon high jumping, but still shared first place with four others in the pole vault, including Olympic champion Bill Miller and outdoor world record holder Bill Graber. Brown won his first national outdoor title that summer, tying with Matt Gordy at 14 ft (4.26 m). He broke his own indoor world record on February 17, 1934, with a jump of 14 ft 4 in (4.37 m), again at Madison Square Garden. That summer he repeated as both IC4A champion and national outdoor champion.

Brown became captain of the Yale track team in 1935, and won both the pole vault and the high jump at that winter's indoor IC4A meet. In his final collegiate competition on June 1, 1935, at the outdoor IC4A Championships – the same meet where his uncle had broken the world record exactly twenty-three years earlier – Brown cleared a bar set at 14 ft 5 1/8 in (4.39 m), breaking Graber's world record of 14 ft 4 3/8 in (4.37 m). (Earlier that spring Graber had jumped 14 ft 5 5/8 in (4.41 m), but that jump was void for record purposes since the runway had been elevated by two inches (5 cm).) Later that summer, Brown broke the British all-comers record on two occasions and won the AAA Championships. A panel of experts viewed him as likely to make the American team for the 1936 Summer Olympics in Berlin, but he retired from the sport without attempting to qualify.

== Later life and political career ==
In 1946, Brown and his family took what was intended to be a six-week winter holiday in Arizona. They ended up staying there permanently, buying the 40,000-acre Santa Rita Ranch south of Tucson in Pima County; Brown thus left behind a job with Booz Allen Hamilton to become a rancher.

Brown soon became involved in Republican politics in Pima County and Arizona, serving in the Arizona State Legislature from 1955 to 1959. When Richard Kleindienst resigned as chairman of the Arizona Republican Party due to business pressures in early 1963, Brown was endorsed to be his successor by top Republican leaders, including Arizona Senator Barry Goldwater. Although challenged by Evan Mecham, who had been the Republican candidate in the previous year's Senate elections, the more moderate Brown was selected for the chairmanship. He was Arizona party chairman when Goldwater became the state's first candidate for the presidency. He was also a delegate at the 1964 Republican National Convention, and in September 1964 he was appointed to the executive branch of the Republican National Committee. He resigned the chairmanship in the spring of 1965 due to the demands of his business life, as well as the inconvenience of commuting from the Tucson area to the state capital of Phoenix.

In 1972, Brown was named the Southern Arizona chairman of the Committee to Re-elect the President.

== Business activities ==
In addition to his career as a cattle rancher, Brown was chairman of the board and the leading stockholder of American Atomics Corporation, a Tucson-based company that used radioactive tritium to make luminescent tubes for clocks, watches and signs. Although the company's then-CEO Peter J. Biehl stated in 1977 that the radioactivity presented no danger, American Atomics was controversially shut down in the summer of 1979 by Governor Bruce Babbitt after high levels of radioactive tritium were measured in Tucson near its factory. Critics also claimed the firm had been more concerned with profits than public safety.

Brown also served as director of the Southern Arizona Bank and Trust Company.

== Personal life ==
Brown married Katherine McLennan, daughter of Marsh & McLennan co-founder Donald R. McLennan, at Lake Forest, Illinois on July 3, 1937. The couple had two sons (Keith Jr. and Steve) and two daughters (Julia and Katherine), with the first three children born in Illinois and the youngest, Steve, after the family's relocation to Arizona. They lived on their Santa Rita Ranch until 1967, when they moved to Tucson; they bought another, smaller ranch there after selling the Santa Rita Ranch in 1971. After Katherine's death in 1982, Brown married Mary Lou Stevens. They moved to Del Mar, California, where he died of emphysema in July 1991.

Records
Preceded by (United States) Bill Graber	Men's Pole Vault Outdoor World Record Holder; June 1, 1935 – July 4, 1936	Succeeded by (United States) George Varoff
Preceded by (United States) Sabin Carr	Men's Pole Vault Indoor World Record Holder; March 15, 1933 – February 17, 1937	Succeeded by (United States) George Varoff
