= Last Stop (1935 film) =

1935 film

- DVD cover
- Directed by: E. W. Emo
- Written by: Philipp Lothar Mayring
- Produced by: Paul Hörbiger; Karl Künzel
- Starring: Paul Hörbiger; Hans Moser; Josefine Dora
- Cinematography: Ewald Daub
- Edited by: Alice Ludwig
- Music by: Viktor Corzilius; Siegfried Schulz
- Production company: Algefa Film
- Distributed by: Rota-Film
- Release date: 4 June 1935
- Running time: 90 minutes
- Country: Germany
- Language: German

Last Stop (German: Endstation) is a 1935 German romantic comedy film directed by E. W. Emo and starring Paul Hörbiger, Hans Moser, and Josefine Dora. It was filmed and set in Vienna.

The film's sets were designed by the art directors Kurt Dürnhöfer and Willi Herrmann.

== Plot ==
The film is about the tram driver Karl Vierthaler, who falls in love with the hat maker Anna. However, his parents have already planned the confectioner's daughter Rosa Schilling as a future wife for their son, which is why Karl should give up his job as a tram driver. With a good deal of stubbornness, Karl finally manages to get his way and win over Anna.

== Cast ==
- Paul Hörbiger as Karl Vierthaler, Straßenbahnschaffner
- Hans Moser as Karl Vierthaler senior, Oberkontrollor
- Josefine Dora as Frau Vierthaler
- Toni von Bukovics as Frau Wendler
- Maria Andergast as Anna Wendler, ihre Tochter, Näherin
- Oscar Sabo as Schilling, Konditor
- Otti Dietze as Frau Schilling
- Eta Klingenberg as Rosa Schilling
- Hubert von Meyerinck as Marcel Steiner, Direktor des Salon 'Flora'
- Julia Serda as Frau Hofrat Crusius
- Oskar Sima as Straßenbahninspektor Grenzing
- Hermann Meyer-Falkow as Ein Schaffner
- Betty Sedlmayr as Mizzi
- Hugo Flink as Otti Staudinger
- Adolf Satzenhofer as Portier
- Olga Limburg
- Else Lüders as Kundin
- Beppo Seidler as Oberkellner

== Bibliography ==
- Dassanowsky, Robert, ed. (2012). World Film Locations: Vienna. Bristol: Intellect Books. ISBN 978-1-84150-569-5.
