= Viktor Zsuffka =

Hungarian pole vaulter

Personal information
- Nationality: Hungarian
- Born: 9 July 1910 Moldova Nouă, Austria-Hungary
- Died: 20 June 2001 (aged 90) San Francisco, California, U.S.
- Height: 185 cm (6 ft 1 in)
- Weight: 78 kg (172 lb)

Sport
- Sport: Athletics
- Event: Pole vault
- Club: MAC, Budapest

Viktor Péter Zsuffka (9 July 1910 – 20 June 2001) was a Hungarian athlete. He competed in the men's pole vault at the 1936 Summer Olympics.

Zsuffka finished second behind Danilo Innocenti in the pole vault event at the 1933 AAA Championships.
