= Moldova Nouă mine =

Copper mine in Caraș-Severin County, Romania

- Location: Moldova Nouă, Caraș-Severin County, Romania
- Products: Copper
- Company: Minvest

The Moldova Nouă mine is a large mine in the west of Romania in Caraș-Severin County, 93 km southwest of Reșița and 579 km north-west of the capital, Bucharest. Moldova Nouă represents the second largest copper reserve in Romania having estimated reserves of 500 million tonnes of ore grading 0.35% copper.
