= Matt Gordy =

American pole vaulter

Matthew Bell Gordy (December 26, 1909 – August 18, 1989) was an American pole vaulter. In 1933 Gordy shared first place at both the NCAA championships and the national championships and helped Louisiana State University win the NCAA team title.

== Early life ==
Gordy grew up in the small city of Abbeville, Louisiana. As Abbeville was home to a bamboo grove, local athletes had easy access to bamboo poles that would otherwise have been expensive, and pole vaulting became popular as a result. In high school, Gordy also competed in high jump, long jump and triple jump, but LSU head coach Bernie Moore felt the pole vault would be his best event.

== Career ==
Entering the 1933 NCAA championships, neither the LSU Tigers or Gordy individually were considered favorites. However, LSU's stars Glenn "Slats" Hardin and Jack Torrance scored a combined three wins and a third place, and with only the pole vault left, LSU had a slim lead over coach Dean Cromwell's University of Southern California. In the pole vault, USC fielded Bill Graber, who was a 1932 Olympian and held the outdoor world record of 14 ft 4 3/8 in (4.37 m), while Gordy came in with a personal best of only 13 ft 4 1/4 in (4.07 m). If Graber won, Gordy had to score six points (the score for third place, or a three-way tie for second) for LSU to tie with USC, and more than six points for LSU to win outright.

Four jumpers, including both Graber and Gordy, cleared 13 ft 6 in (4.11 m); for Gordy, this was already a personal best. Graber then cleared 14 ft (4.26 m) to break the tie; Gordy was left in a three-way tie for second, which would have tied the score between LSU and USC at 55 points each. On his last attempt Gordy cleared 14 ft, tying Graber for first, and LSU won the meet outright; after a remeasurement, the height cleared by Graber and Gordy was ratified as 13 ft 11 1/16 in (4.24 m), which was a new meeting record.

At the national (AAU) championships two weeks later Gordy again tied for first, this time with indoor world record holder Keith Brown of Yale. The winning height, 14 ft (4.26 m), was Gordy's personal best; he was the tenth amateur in the world to jump 14 ft or more. The 1933 national championships were Gordy's last major meet, as he graduated from LSU and went to work on the oil rigs of Louisiana and later Texas; he eventually became an Amoco drilling superintendent in Houston.

== Legacy ==
Gordy was inducted in the Louisiana State University Athletic Hall of Fame in 1937 and in the Louisiana Sports Hall of Fame in 1985.
