= Kiyoshi Adachi =

Kiyoshi Adachi may refer to:

- Kiyoshi Adachi (pole vaulter) (1914–?), Japanese pole vaulter
- Kiyoshi Adachi (politician) (born 1969), former member of the Japanese House of Councillors
- Kiyoshi Adachi, main character in the Japanese boys' love (BL) manga series Cherry Magic!
