= Moldova Veche Island =

Island in Romania

Coordinates: 44°41′41″N 21°37′43″E

Ostrovul Moldova Veche
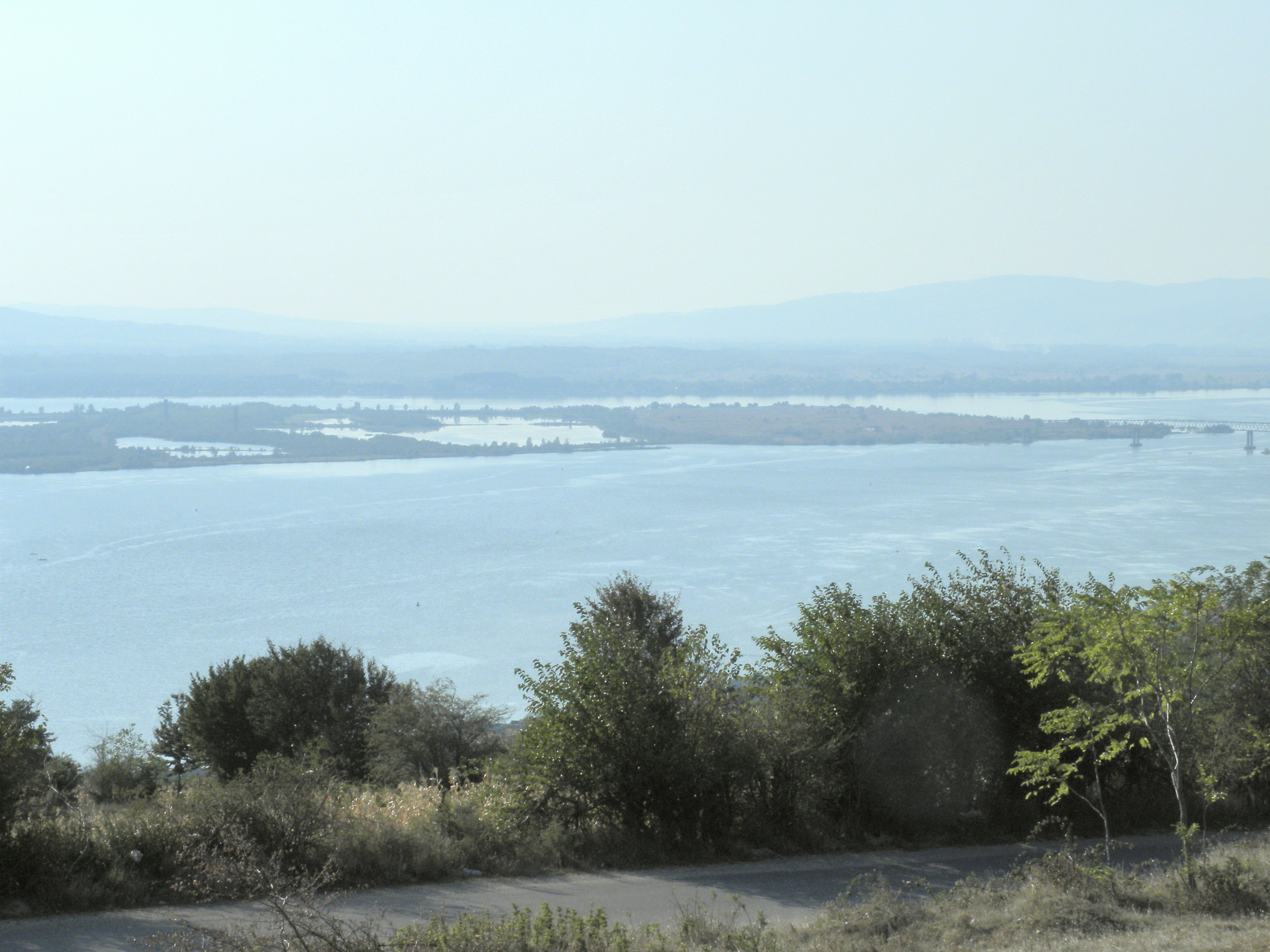
- Interactive map of Moldova Veche Island

Geography
- Location: Danube

The Moldova Veche Island (Romanian: Ostrovul Moldova Veche) is located on the Danube, south of the town of Moldova Nouă and approximately three kilometers from the port. With an area of 345 hectares.

== Description ==
The island has a sandy-pebbly soil, with forest patches dominated by the white willow tree species, Salix alba, with flora and fauna specific to wetlands. The island is approximately six kilometers long. Before 1970, it was much larger, but was flooded with the sinking of Ada Kaleh island (which was located approximately 70 kilometers downstream), for the construction of the Iron Gates I hydroelectric power plant in 1970.

== Protected area ==
The island and the water surface bordering the island up to a depth of 2 m are included in the Special Avifaunistic Protection Area Ostrovul Moldova Veche with an area of 1627 hectares (of which 345 hectares the island itself), declared a protected area by Government Decision No. 2151 of 30 November 2004 (on the establishment of the protected natural area regime for new areas). This is included in the Iron Gates Natural Park, a natural park located on the territorial surface of the Danube River - Baziaș - Iron Gates site of community importance. Two lakes also extend inside the island, without connection to the Danube, which actually occupy the largest area.

== Tourist attractions ==
=== The Legend of Attila's Tomb ===
The highest point on the island is a mound of earth that local legends say is the tomb of Attila, the most powerful leader of the Huns, also called "God's Whip", who ruled between 433–453. Legend has it that Attila was buried on an island somewhere on the Danube, but the location has not been discovered. According to this legend, Attila had so many soldiers that upon his death, each of his soldiers would have carried a helmet of earth that they would have placed over the leader's grave, and thus, a mound was formed at that place.

=== Baba Caia Rock ===
At the downstream end of the island, near the town of Coronini, there is a solitary limestone rock, called Baba Caia, marking the entrance to the Danube gorge. The rock is seven meters high, being unique on the Romanian Danube, and is an attraction for tourists. The name of the rock comes from the Turkish word "Babacai", meaning "Father's Rock".

=== Wild horse colony ===
There is a colony of wild horses on the island, approximately 100 in number, that live completely disconnected from humans, in complete freedom. The horses once belonged to the Serbs who lived in Moldova Veche. In 1910, 90 percent of the inhabitants here were Serbs, but after the unification of Banat with Romania, the area was colonized by the Romanian population, with only about 15 percent of the inhabitants being Serbs. In the 1970s, the Serbs of Moldova Veche bred horses on the island of Ostrov. They had a ferry that they used to transport the animals to the island. After 1989, the ferry disappeared, and the horses that remained there began to reproduce naturally and remained wild horses.

=== Golubac Fortress ===
On the right side, on the Serbian bank, is the Golubac Fortress, built on the rocks. The first documentary mention of the fortress dates back to 1335, when it was a Hungarian military fortress. Then, for a long time, the fortress was controlled by the Serbian king Dragutin, until the Battle of Kosovo when it came under Turkish rule. Finally, in the 19th century, it returned to Serbia. The fortress has 9 towers with a height of 25 meters. Golubac Fortress is considered to be one of the most important city-fortresses in the Balkans.
