= Andries du Plessis =

South African pole vaulter (1910–1979)

Personal information
- Born: 1 October 1910
- Died: 12 October 1979 (aged 69)
Medal record
Men's Athletics
Representing South Africa
British Empire Games
Gold medal – first place	1938 Sydney	Pole vault

Andries Stephanus du Plessis (1 October 1910 – 12 October 1979) was a South African track and field athlete who competed in the 1936 Summer Olympics. He was born in Germiston.

In 1936 he finished 17th in the Olympic pole vault event. At the 1934 Empire Games he finished fourth in the pole vault competition. He also participated in the 120 yards hurdles contest but was eliminated in the heats. Four years later he won the gold medal in the pole vault event at the 1938 Empire Games in Sydney.
