= Jan Korejs =

Czech pole vaulter

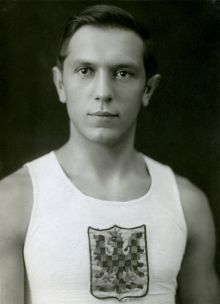

Personal information
- Nationality: Czech
- Born: 27 April 1907 Žebětín, Austria-Hungary
- Died: 8 August 1949 (aged 42) Brno, Czechoslovakia

Sport
- Sport: Athletics
- Event: Pole vault

Jan Korejs (27 April 1907 - 8 August 1949) was a Czechoslovak athlete. He competed in the men's pole vault at the 1936 Summer Olympics.

== Life ==
Jan Korejs was born in Žebětín. He started athletics in the mid-1920s in athletic club Sokol Žebětín. Since 1926 he was a member of Moravská Slavia Brno. Before World War II he was the best Czechoslovak pole vaulter. He set the Czechoslovak record three times, and was the first Czechoslovak to vault over 400 cm. In 1929 and 1930 he became the national champion. Korejs competed at the 1936 Olympics in Berlin, where he finished in 6th place, as a best European pole vaulter in the competition.

In 1932 he graduated from the Faculty of Law of Masaryk University and started to work as a lawyer. After 1948 coup d'état he was involved in helping Czechoslovak citizens escape across the border to Austria. He was arrested by the communist State Security on 6 August 1949 and died in custody two days later under unclear circumstances. The official cause of his death that was given by the police was suicide by hanging. He was buried under a fictitious name in Brno cemetery. His family was only informed of his arrest and death 2 weeks later. In 1994 he was fully rehabilitated by Czech justice system. The Czech Police opened investigation into his death in 2011 with inconclusive results.
