= Ernst Larsen (pole vaulter) =

Danish pole vaulter

Personal information
- Nationality: Danish
- Born: 24 February 1910
- Died: 20 May 1971 (aged 61)

Sport
- Sport: Athletics
- Event: Pole vault

Ernst Larsen (24 February 1910 – 20 May 1971) was a Danish athlete. He competed in the men's pole vault at the 1936 Summer Olympics.
