= Port of Moldova Veche =

- Location in Romania

Location
- Country: Romania
- Location: Caraș-Severin County
- Coordinates: 44°43′22.41″N 21°36′56.76″E

Details
- Operated by: partially by Tehnosteel Vest
- Owned by: Administratia Porturilor Dunarii Fluviale
- Type of harbour: Natural/Artificial
- Size: 31,240 square metres (3.124 ha)
- No. of berths: 6
- General manager: Ofiteru Danut

Statistics
- Annual cargo tonnage: 250,000 tonnes (2008)
- Website; Official site

The Port of Moldova Veche is one of the largest Romanian river ports, located in the town of Moldova Nouă on the Danube River. The port has 6 berths with a total quay length of 560 metres (1,840 ft) and two terminals, one for cargo and one passenger terminal. Located on the Danube's left bank, it straddles kilometers 1047 through 1050 of the river's course. It is mainly used for handling wood products, sand and gravel, bricks and fertilizers.
