= Shizuo Mochizuki =

Japanese pole vaulter

Personal information
- Nationality: Japanese
- Born: 3 October 1909

Sport
- Sport: Athletics
- Event: Pole vault

Shizuo Mochizuki (望月 倭夫, Mochizuki Shizuo; born 3 October 1909, date of death unknown) was a Japanese athlete. He competed in the men's pole vault at the 1932 Summer Olympics.
