= Josef Haunzwickel =

Austrian pole vaulter

Personal information
- Nationality: Austrian
- Born: 4 January 1915
- Died: 19 May 2001 (aged 86)

Sport
- Sport: Athletics
- Event: Pole vault

Josef Haunzwickel (4 January 1915 – 19 May 2001) was an Austrian athlete. He competed in the men's pole vault at the 1936 Summer Olympics.
