= Anca Pop =

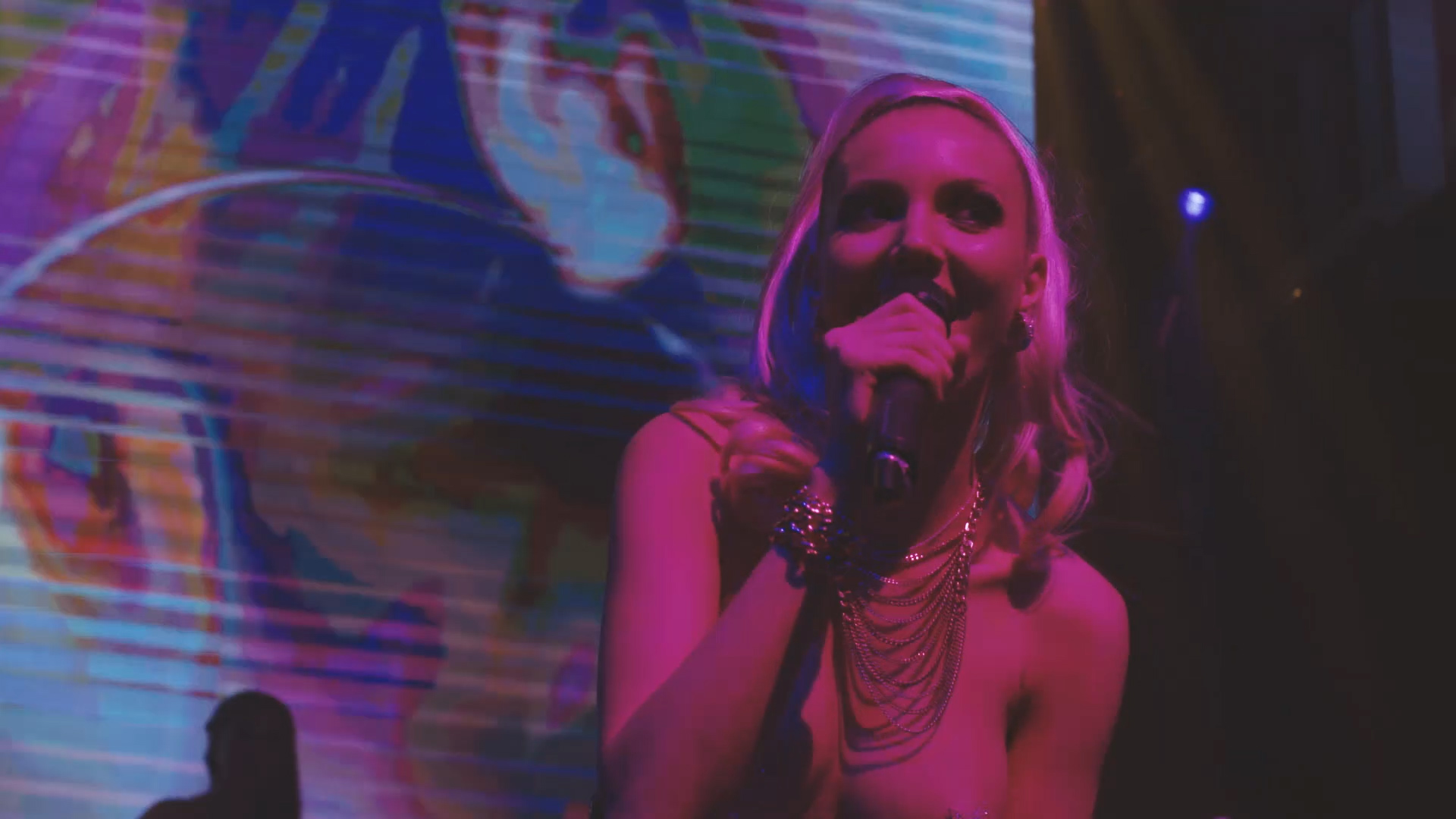
- Anca Pop performing in Macao.

Background information
- Born: Anca Pop; October 22, 1984; Moldova Nouă, Caraș-Severin County, Romania
- Died: December 16, 2018 (aged 34) Svinița, Mehedinți County, Romania
- Occupations: Singer; songwriter; producer
- Instruments: Mandolin; guitar
- Years active: 2008–2018
- Labels: Roton Music; Because Music; Edel Italy; Warner Music Group
- Website: ancapop.com

Anca Pop (October 22, 1984 – December 16, 2018) was a Romanian Canadian singer-songwriter. On July 12, 2017, she released her self-titled debut studio album exclusively in Japan which spawned four singles including: "Free Love", "Super Cool", "Ring Around", and "Loco Poco".

In 2008, she met Yugoslav and Serbian musician Goran Bregović, and she wrote two songs for his thirteenth studio album Champagne for Gypsies. After her collaboration with Bregović, she signed a record deal with Roton Music. She also appeared on the cover of Playboy for the July–August issue.

== Early life ==
Pop was born on October 22, 1984, in Moldova Nouă, Romania. When she was three years old, her parents fled the Socialist Republic of Romania to Yugoslavia. Once they arrived they were taken to a refugee camp near Belgrade; they stayed there 7 months before going to a political asylum in Kitchener, Ontario, Canada. She started being passionated by music, and she started taking mandolin and singing lessons when she was 7 years old. Eventually her parents came back in Romania as soon as the communism ended.

== Career ==
Her debut single, "Free Love", was released on April 28, 2015, with an accompanying music video on the same day. A month later, another version of the video was released for Playboy magazine. "Free Love" was also voted by 100,000 people as the best pop song of July during a poll for OurStage. "Super Cool" was released on March 24, 2016, as the second single from her upcoming debut studio album. In May of the same year she was invited along with Emil Rengle to the Cannes Film Festival by Warner Music Group for a possible collaboration with them. The third single, "Ring Around", was released on January 25, 2017, with an accompanying music video on the same day. The fourth single, "Loco Poco", was released in 38 countries on May 26, 2017, by Roton and Edel Italy.

== Personal life ==
She lived in an apartment in Bucharest. She was passionated by spirituality and she searched for inspiration in Peru, India and Thailand. She came out as bisexual on a TV show named Totul pentru dragoste, and she had an open relationship with a girl named Fraga.

== Death ==
She died on 16 December 2018. She was 34 at the time of her death. The singer died after she lost control of her car for unknown reasons and the car plunged into the Danube river, near the commune Svinița, while she was heading to her parents' home. Three divers, helped by military of the emergency authorities, were involved in the recovery of the body. The funeral took place on December 20, 2018, on the Danube's shore, in the commune of Sviniţa, being the artist's wish to be buried as close to the place of death.

== Discography ==
=== Studio albums ===
Title	Album details
Anca Pop	Released: July 12, 2017; Label: Roton, Aqua Production; Format: CD, Digital download

== Singles ==
=== As lead artist ===
Title	Year	Album
"Free Love"	2015	Anca Pop
"Super Cool"	2016	Anca Pop
"Ring Around"	2017	Anca Pop
"Loco Poco"	2017	Anca Pop
"Ederlezi" (featuring Goran Bregović)	2017	Anca Pop

=== As featured artist ===
Title	Year	Album
"Love Is" (FUMI★YEAH! featuring Anca Pop)	2017	Anca Pop
