= Wilhelm Schneider =

Polish athlete

Personal information
- Nationality: Polish
- Born: 9 July 1909 Kattowitz, German Empire
- Died: 28 December 1988 (aged 79)

Sport
- Sport: Athletics
- Event: Pole vault

Wilhelm Schneider (9 July 1909 – 28 December 1988) was a Polish athlete. He competed in the men's pole vault at the 1936 Summer Olympics.
