= André Crépin =

French pole vaulter

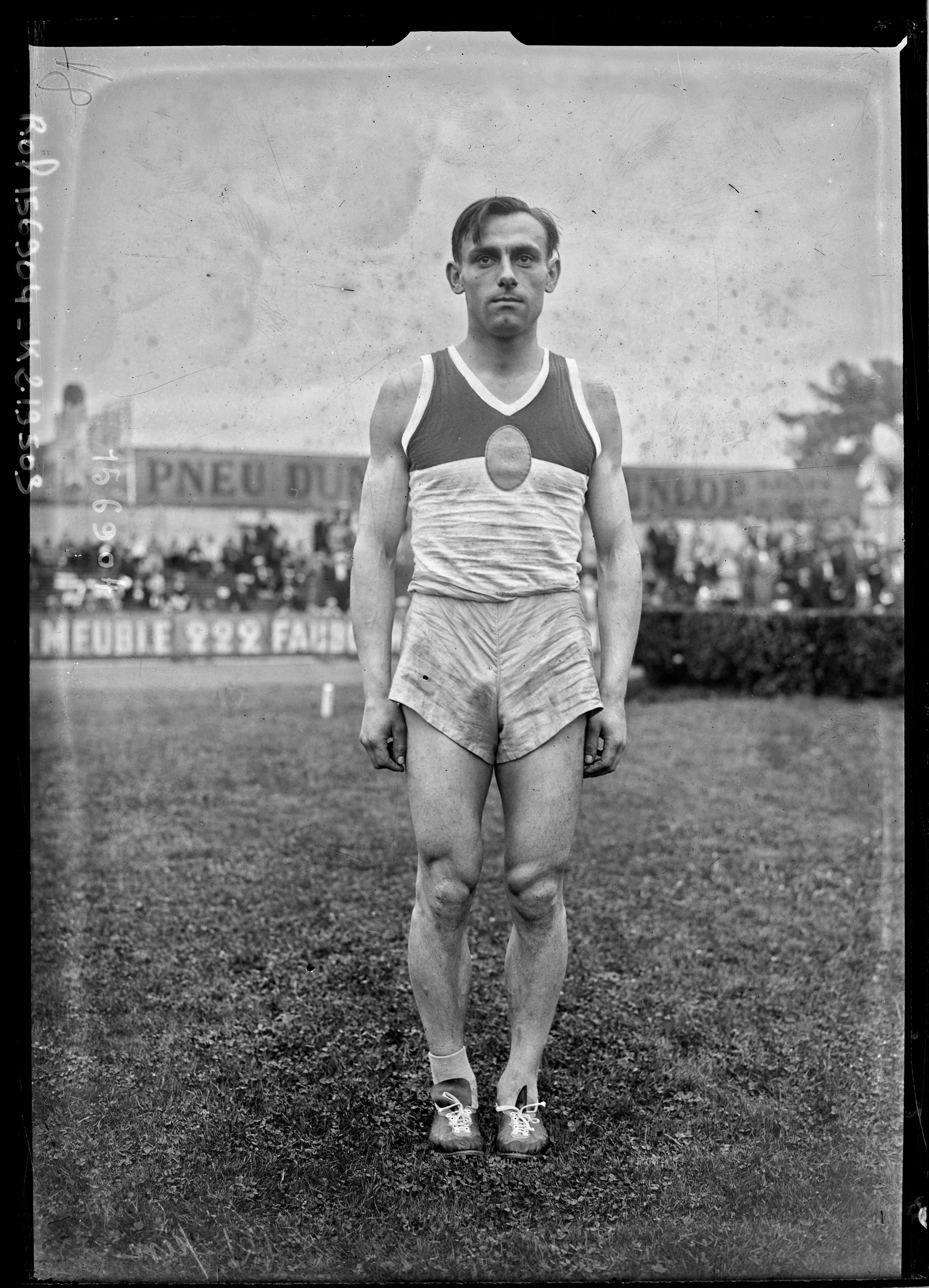

Personal information
- Nationality: French
- Born: 8 December 1907
- Died: 16 December 1994 (aged 87)

Sport
- Sport: Athletics
- Event: Pole vault

André Crépin (8 December 1907 – 16 December 1994) was a French athlete. He competed in the men's pole vault at the 1936 Summer Olympics.
