= Jaša Bakov =

Serbian pole vaulter (1906–1974)

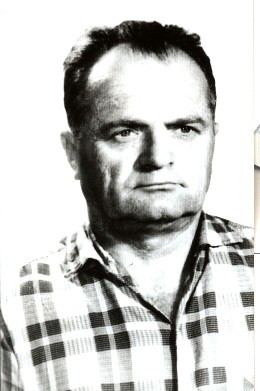

Personal information
- Full name: Joakim Jaša Bakov
- Nationality: Serbian
- Born: 9 December 1906 Đurđevo, Austria-Hungary
- Died: 21 October 1974 (aged 67) Novi Sad, Yugoslavia

Sport
- Sport: Athletics
- Event: Pole vault

Joakim Jaša Bakov (9 December 1906 – 21 October 1974) was a Serbian athlete. He competed in the men's pole vault at the 1936 Summer Olympics, representing Yugoslavia.
