= 1933 NCAA Track and Field Championships =

1933 NCAA Men's Track and Field Championships
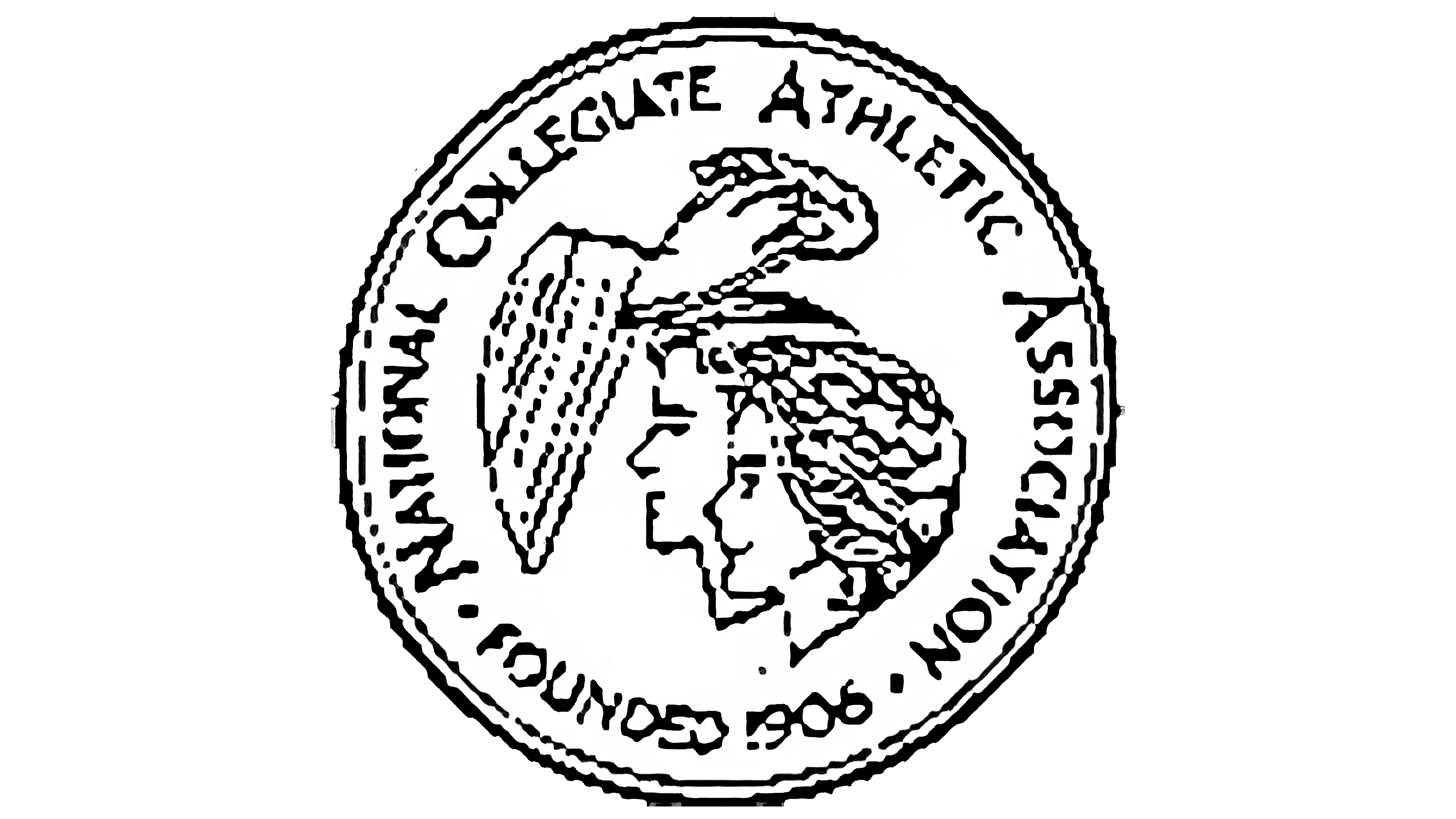
- Team Champion: LSU (1st title)
- Edition: 12th
- Dates: June 16-17, 1933
- Host city: Chicago, Illinois
- Venue: Soldier Field

The 1933 NCAA Track and Field Championships was the twelfth NCAA track and field championship. The meet was held at Chicago, Illinois on the 16th and 17th of June, 1933.

== Team championship ==
1. LSU - 58 points
2. Southern California - 54 points
3. Indiana - 27 points
4. Stanford - 26-3/7 points
5. Michigan - 24-3/5 points
6. Illinois State - 22 points
6. Kansas - 22 points
8. Marquette - 20-6/7 points
9. Oregon - 20 points
10. Nebraska - 16 points

== Track events ==
100-yard dash
1. Ralph Metcalfe, Marquette - 9.4 seconds
2. Paul Starr, Oregon
3. Jimmy Johnson, Illinois State Normal
4. Leslie Bell, USC
5. Charlie Parsons, USC
6. Hudson Hellmich, Illinois

120-yard high hurdles
1. Gus Meier, Stanford - 14.2 seconds
2. Al Moreau, LSU
3. Hawley Egleston, Michigan
4. Ned Bacon, Denison
5. Charles Caspar, TCU
6. Dan Bracken, Washington

220-yard dash
1. Ralph Metcalfe, Marquette - 20.4 seconds
2. Jimmy Johnson, Illinois State Normal
3. Paul Starr, Oregon
4. Charlie Parsons, USC
5. Ivan Fuqua, Indiana
6. Swisher, Kansas State Teachers

220-yard low hurdles
1. Glenn Hardin, LSU - 22.9 seconds
2. Heye Lambertus, Nebraska
3. Norm Paul, USC
4. Gus Meier, Stanford
5. Ned Bacon, Denison
6. Al Moreau, LSU

440-yard dash
1. Glenn Hardin, LSU - 47.1 seconds
2. Ivan Fuqua, Indiana
3. Ed Ablowich, USC
4. Walter Dean, Iowa
5. Bart Ward, Oklahoma
6. Harry Thompkins, USC

880-yard run
1. Charles Hornbostel, Indiana - 1:50.9
2. Glenn Cunningham, Kansas
3. John Simmons, Abilene Christian
4. Ferris Webster, USC
5. Ed Turner, Michigan
6. Earl Labertew, Iowa State

One-mile run
1. Glenn Cunningham, Kansas - 4:09.8
2. Lyle Hutton, Illinois State Normal
3. Ray Sears, Butler
4. Bill Howell, Michigan
5. Dean Woolsey, Illinois
6. Charles Hornbostel, Indiana

Two-mile run
1. Mike Pilbrow, Grinnell - 9:22.8
2. Clifford Watson, Indiana
3. Forrest Harvey, Colorado Aggies
4. Joe McCluskey, Fordham
5. Jim Freestad, North Dakota State Teachers
6. James Smith, Kansas State Teachers

== Field events ==
Broad jump
1. John Brooks, Chicago - 24 feet, 4-3/4 inches
2. Donald Gray, Nebraska
3. Armin Dreusicke, Elmhurst
4. Kepner, Wichita
5. Louis Adams, Rice Institute
6. Bart Ward, Oklahoma

High jump
1. Duncan McNaughton, USC - 6 feet, 4 inches
2. Vince Murphy, Notre Dame - 6 feet, 4 inches
3. Willis Ward, Michigan - 6 feet, 3 inches
3. Spencer, Geneva - 6 feet, 3 inches
3. Worth Watkins, Abilene Christian - 6 feet, 3 inches
3. Lloyd Richey, Alabama Poly - 6 feet, 3 inches
3. Jameson, Colorado - 6 feet, 3 inches

Pole vault
1. Bill Graber, USC - 14 feet, 0 inches
1. Matthew Gordy, LSU - 14 feet, 0 inches
3. Ernest Lennington, Illinois
3. John Wonsowitz, Ohio St.
5. Don Zimmerman, Tulane
5. Lowry, Michigan Normal
5. Miller, Stanford
5. Roark, Marquette
5. Dick Schram, Marquette
5. Ralph Lovshin, Wisconsin
5. Monte Holcomb, Michigan St.

Discus throw
1. Henri Laborde, Stanford - 163 feet, 3/4 inch
2. Delbert White, Kansas State Teachers-Pitt
3. Jack Torrance, LSU
4. Jess Petty, Rice Institute
5. Westley Busbee, Indiana
6. Honk Irwin, Texas A&M

Javelin
1. Duane Purvis, Purdue - 216 feet, 6 1/4 inches
2. Bud Sample, Arizona
3. Demaris, Oregon
4. Nathan Blair, LSU
5. Beggs, Geneva
6. Frank Williamson, USC

Shot put
1. Jack Torrance, LSU - 52 feet, 10 inches
2. Hueston Harper, USC
3. LeRoy Dues, Detroit City College
4. Elwyn Dees, Kansas
5. Henri Laborde, Stanford
6. Honk Irwin, Texas A&M

Hammer throw
1. Roderick Cox, Michigan - 156 feet, 3/4 inch
2. Chester Cruikshank, Colorado Aggies
3. Noble Biddinger, Indiana
4. Gantt Miller, West Virginia
5. Peter Somfeld, Pomona Col.
6. Earl Johnson, Ohio State

== See also ==
- NCAA Men's Outdoor Track and Field Championship
