= Guillermo Chirichigno =

Peruvian pole vaulter

Personal information
- Nationality: Peruvian
- Born: 25 June 1902
- Died: 3 June 1970 (aged 67)

Sport
- Sport: Athletics
- Event: Pole vault

Guillermo Chirichigno (25 June 1902 – 3 June 1970) was a Peruvian athlete. He competed in the men's pole vault at the 1936 Summer Olympics, finishing 29th. He won a gold medal at the South American Championships in Athletics in 1935, and silver in the inaugural 1938 Bolivarian Games.
