= Clara Vădineanu =

Romanian handball player (born 1986)

Personal information
- Full name: Clara Stela Vădineanu
- Nationality: Romanian
- Born: 26 October 1986 (age 39) Moldova Nouă, Romania
- Height: 1.83 m (6 ft 0 in)

Sport
- Sport: Handball
- Position: Left back
- Current club: HCM Roman

Senior clubs
- Years: Team
- –: CSS Slatina
- –: LPS Slatina
- –: CSM Cetate Devatrans Deva
- –: CS Oltchim Râmnicu Vâlcea
- –: "U" Jolidon Cluj-Napoca
- –: HCM Râmnicu Vâlcea
- –: HCM Roman
National team
Years	Team	Apps	(Gls)
–	Romania	52	(116)
- Updated on 16 December 2012

Clara Vădineanu (former Vînătoru; born 26 October 1986) is a Romanian handballer.
