= Fu Baolu =

Chinese pole vaulter (1913–1943)

Personal information
- Nationality: Chinese
- Born: 23 June 1913
- Died: 8 July 1943 (aged 30) near Baishiyi Air Base, Chongqing, Republic of China

Sport
- Sport: Athletics
- Event: Pole vault

Fu Baolu (23 June 1913 – 8 July 1943) was a Chinese athlete. He competed in the men's pole vault at the 1936 Summer Olympics. He also set several national records in the pole vault. He was killed in a plane crash during a training flight with the Chinese Air Force.
