= Miroslav Klásek =

Czech pole vaulter

Personal information
- Nationality: Czech
- Born: 8 February 1913
- Died: 18 June 1976 (aged 63)

Sport
- Sport: Athletics
- Event: Pole vault

Miroslav Klásek (8 February 1913 – 18 June 1976) was a Czech athlete. He competed in the men's pole vault at the 1936 Summer Olympics. Immediately prior to this, Klásek set a new national record in the event, which gained him selection for the Olympics.
