= Leo Monaghan =

Australian rules footballer, born 1916

Personal information
- Full name: Leo Patrick Monaghan
- Born: 22 August 1916; Culcairn, New South Wales
- Died: 23 March 1996 (aged 79)
- Original team: Culcairn
- Height: 180 cm (5 ft 11 in)
- Weight: 86 kg (190 lb)
- Position: Defence

Playing career^{1}
Years	Club	Games (Goals)
1935	South Melbourne	2 (0)
1936, 1938, 1941–44, 1947–48	Fitzroy	52 (20)
Total		54 (20)
- ^{1} Playing statistics correct to the end of 1948.

Leo Patrick Monaghan (22 August 1916 – 23 March 1996) was an Australian rules footballer who played with South Melbourne and Fitzroy in the Victorian Football League (VFL).
