= Athletics at the 1932 Summer Olympics – Men's pole vault =

Men's pole vault at the Games of the X Olympiad
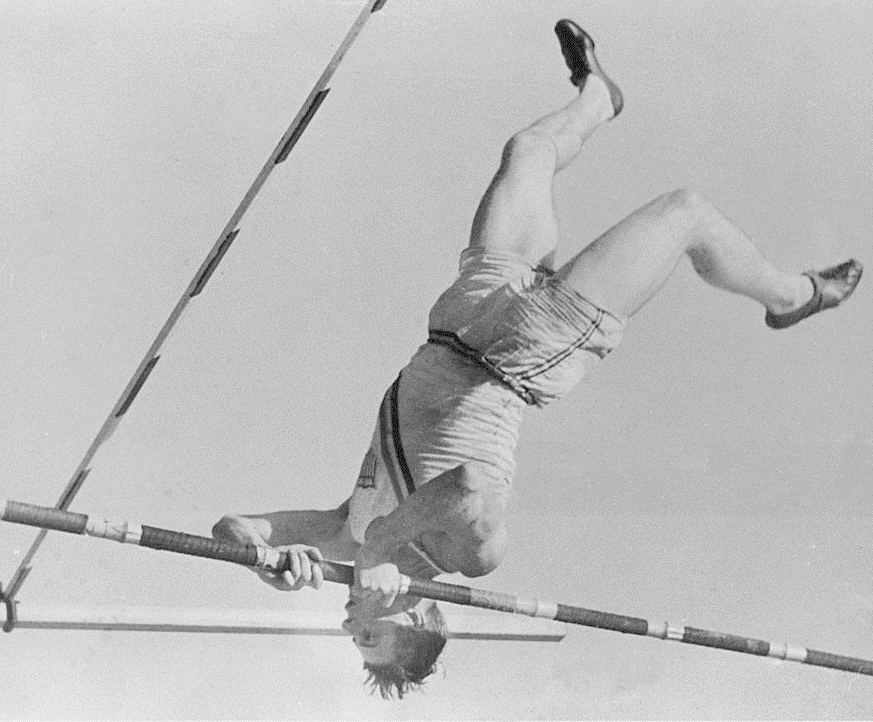
- Bill Miller vaulting
- Venue: Los Angeles Memorial Coliseum
- Dates: August 3, 1932
- Competitors: 8 from 4 nations
- Winning height: 4.315 OR

Medalists
1st place, gold medalist(s)		Bill Miller; United States
2nd place, silver medalist(s)		Shuhei Nishida; Japan
3rd place, bronze medalist(s)		George Jefferson; United States

The men's pole vault event at the 1932 Olympic Games took place August 3. Eight athletes from four nations competed. The 1930 Olympic Congress in Berlin had reduced the limit from 4 athletes per NOC to 3 athletes. The event was won by Bill Miller of the United States, the nation's ninth consecutive victory in the men's pole vault. Japan won its first pole vault medal, with Shuhei Nishida's silver. George Jefferson won bronze, extending the American streak of two or more medals in each pole vault to nine as well.

== Background ==
This was the ninth appearance of the event, which is one of 12 athletics events to have been held at every Summer Olympics. No vaulters from the 1928 Games returned. The American team, this time led by Bill Graber after he broke the world record in the trials, was again favored.

No nations made their first appearance in the event, the first Games in which that was the case. The United States made its ninth appearance, the only nation to have competed at every Olympic men's pole vault to that point.

== Competition format ==
With only eight vaulters, there was only one round of vaulting rather than the usual two. Vaulters received three attempts at each height.

== Records ==
These were the standing world and Olympic records (in metres) prior to the 1932 Summer Olympics.

World record	William Graber (USA)	4.37	Palo Alto, United States	16 July 1932
Olympic record	Sabin Carr (USA)	4.20	Amsterdam, Netherlands	1 August 1928

All three medalists (George Jefferson, Shuhei Nishida, and Bill Miller) matched the Olympic record at 4.20 metres. Nishida and Miller broke it, successfully vaulting first 4.25 metres and then 4.30 metres. Miller finished with the new record, clearing 4.315 metres when Nishida could not.

== Schedule ==
Date	Time	Round
Wednesday, 3 August 1932	14:30	Final

== Results ==
Key

- o = Height cleared
- x = Height failed
- – = Height passed
- r = Retired
- SB = Season's best
- PB = Personal best
- NR = National record
- AR = Area record
- OR = Olympic record
- WR = World record
- WL = World lead
- NM = No mark
- DNS = Did not start
- DQ = Disqualified

Jump sequences under 4.15 metres are not known.

Rank	Athlete	Nation	3.75	3.90	4.00	4.15	4.20	4.25	4.30	4.315	4.35	Height	Notes
1st place, gold medalist(s)	Bill Miller	United States	o	o	o	xxo	o	o	o	xxo	xxx	4.315	OR
2nd place, silver medalist(s)	Shuhei Nishida	Japan	o	o	o	o	xo	xxo	xxo	xxx	—N/a	4.30	
3rd place, bronze medalist(s)	George Jefferson	United States	o	o	o	—	o	xxx	—N/a			4.20	
4	Bill Graber	United States	o	o	o	xxo	—	xxx	—N/a			4.15	
5	Shizuo Mochizuki	Japan	o	o	o	xxx	—N/a					4.00	
6	Lúcio de Castro	Brazil	o	o	xxx	—N/a						3.90	
7	Peter Clentzos	Greece	o	xxx	—N/a							3.75	
—	Carlos Nelli	Brazil	xxx	—N/a								No mark	
