= Lucien Boekmans =

Belgian hockey player (1922–1996)

Personal information
- Full name: Lucien Charles Émile Boekmans
- Nationality: Belgian
- Born: 14 December 1922 Ixelles, Belgium
- Died: 15 March 1996 (aged 73) Uccle, Belgium

Sport
- Sport: Field hockey

Lucien Charles Émile Boekmans (14 December 1922 – 15 March 1996) was a Belgian field hockey player. He competed in the men's tournament at the 1948 Summer Olympics. Boekmans died on Uccle on 15 March 1996, at the age of 73.
