= Siegfried Schulz =

German pole vaulter

Personal information
- Nationality: German
- Born: 2 July 1910

Sport
- Sport: Athletics
- Event: Pole vault

Siegfried Schulz (born 2 July 1910, date of death unknown) was a German athlete. He competed in the men's pole vault at the 1936 Summer Olympics.
