= Joe Sankey =

Australian cricketer

Personal information
- Full name: Clarence Joseph Sankey
- Born: 27 October 1913; Northdown, Tasmania, Australia
- Died: 12 March 1996 (aged 82); Launceston, Tasmania, Australia

Domestic team information
- Years: Team
- 1934-1948: Tasmania
- Source: Cricinfo, 6 March 2016

Joe Sankey (27 October 1913 – 12 March 1996) was an Australian cricketer. He played seven first-class matches for Tasmania between 1934 and 1948.

== See also ==
- List of Tasmanian representative cricketers
