= Danilo Innocenti =

Italian pole vaulter (1904–1949)

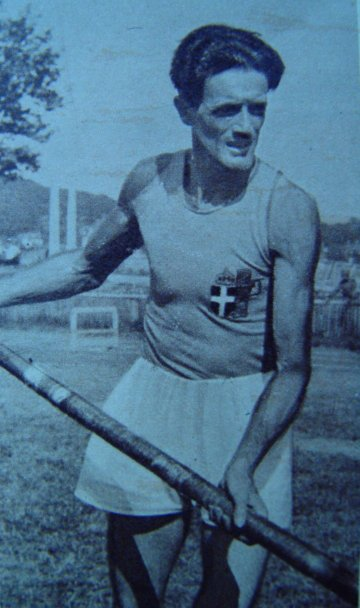

Personal information
- Nationality: Italian
- Born: 27 March 1904 Sesto Fiorentino, Italy
- Died: 26 May 1949 (aged 45) Florence, Italy

Sport
- Country: Italy
- Sport: Athletics
- Event: Pole vault
- Club: Giglio rosso Florence

Achievements and titles
- Personal best: Pole vault: 4.01 m (1936)

Danilo Innocenti (27 March 1904 – 26 May 1949) was an Italian male pole vaulter, who participated at the 1936 Summer Olympics.

== Biography ==
He won ten times, in eleven years from 1927 to 1937, the national championships at senior level.

Innocenti won the British AAA Championships title in the pole vault event at the 1933 AAA Championships.

== Achievements ==
Year	Competition	Venue	Position	Event	Performance	Notes
1934	European Championships	(Italy) Turin	6th	Pole vault	3.80 m	
1936	Olympic Games	(Germany) Berlin	6th	Pole vault	4.00 m	

== National titles ==
- Italian Athletics Championships
  - Pole vault: 1926, 1927, 1928, 1930, 1931, 1932, 1933, 1934, 1935, 1936, 1937
