= George Jefferson (athlete) =

American pole vaulter (1910–1996)

Medal record

Men's athletics

Representing the United States

Olympic Games
Bronze medal – third place	1932 Los Angeles	Pole vault

George Jefferson (George Gordon Jefferson; February 28, 1910 – February 13, 1996) was an American athlete who competed mainly in the pole vault. He was born in Inglewood, California.

A student at UCLA, Jefferson competed for the United States in the 1932 Summer Olympics held in Los Angeles, United States in the pole vault where he won the bronze medal.
