= Stuart Cartwright =

Australian rules footballer, born 1919

Personal information
- Full name: Stuart Albert Cartwright
- Born: 7 September 1919; Birchip, Victoria
- Died: 6 March 1996 (aged 76)
- Original team: Birchip
- Height: 180 cm (5 ft 11 in)
- Weight: 86 kg (190 lb)

Playing career^{1}
Years	Club	Games (Goals)
1945	Richmond	7 (0)
- ^{1} Playing statistics correct to the end of 1945.

Stuart Albert Cartwright (7 September 1919 – 6 March 1996) was a former Australian rules footballer who played with Richmond in the Victorian Football League (VFL).
