= Helmut von Bockelberg =

German politician (1911–1996)

Member of the Bundestag
- In office 20 October 1969 – 13 December 1976

Personal details
- Born: 20 October 1911 Deutsch-Wilmersdorf
- Died: 29 March 1996 (aged 84) Staffelstein, Bavaria, Germany
- Party: CDU

Helmut von Bockelberg (October 20, 1911 – March 29, 1996) was a German politician of the Christian Democratic Union (CDU) and former member of the German Bundestag.

== Life ==
Bockelberg had been a member of the CDU since 1958. From 1960 to 1970, he was chairman of the CDU district association of Bielefeld. Bockelberg, who had previously been a member of the Bielefeld district council from 1958 to 1964, was elected to the German Bundestag in the 1969 federal elections via the North Rhine-Westphalia CDU state list, to which he belonged until 1976.

== Literature ==
Herbst, Ludolf; Jahn, Bruno (2002). Vierhaus, Rudolf (ed.). Biographisches Handbuch der Mitglieder des Deutschen Bundestages. 1949–2002 [Biographical Handbook of the Members of the German Bundestag. 1949–2002] (in German). München: De Gruyter - De Gruyter Saur. p. 1715. ISBN 978-3-11-184511-1.
