= Alfred Waterman =

English cricketer

Alfred George Waterman
Personal information
- Full name: Alfred George Waterman
- Born: 13 May 1911; Walthamstow, Essex, England
- Died: 27 March 1996 (aged 84); Sudbury, Suffolk, England
- Nickname: Tiny
- Batting: Right-handed
- Role: Batsman

Domestic team information
- Years: Team
- 1937–1938: Essex

Career statistics
Competition	FC
Matches	10
Runs scored	380
Batting average
100s/50s
Top score
Balls bowled
Wickets	11
Bowling average
5 wickets in innings
10 wickets in match
Best bowling
Catches/stumpings
- Source: Cricinfo, 20 July 2013

Alfred Waterman (13 May 1911 – 27 March 1996) was an English cricketer. He played for Essex in 1937 and 1938. Later, he served as honorary treasurer and as chairman of Essex and was credited with the plan of financial stringency that enabled the county to survive significant debts in the 1960s and 1970s.
