= Earle Meadows =

American pole vaulter (1913–1992)

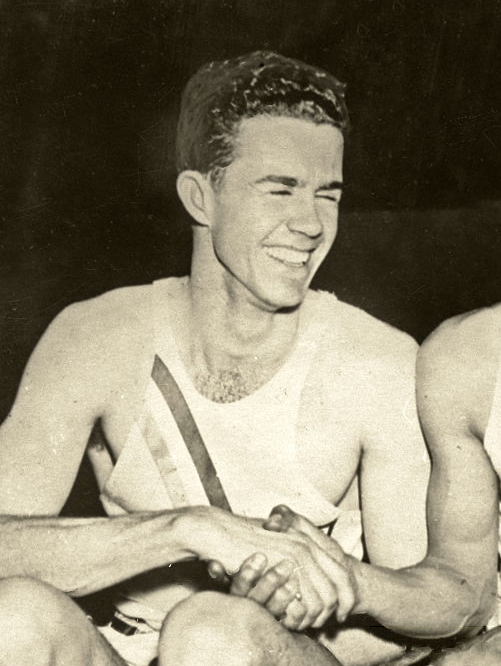
- Meadows at the 1936 Summer Olympics

Personal information
- Full name: Earle Elmer Meadows
- Born: June 29, 1913 Corinth, Mississippi, U.S.
- Died: November 11, 1992 (aged 79) Fort Worth, Texas, U.S.
- Education: University of Southern California
- Height: 6 ft 1 in (1.85 m)
- Weight: 159 lb (72 kg)

Sport
- Country: United States
- Sport: Athletics
- Event: Pole vault
- Club: USC Trojans, Los Angeles
Medal record
Men's athletics
Representing the United States
Olympic Games
Gold medal – first place	1936 Berlin	Pole vault

Earle Elmer Meadows (June 29, 1913 – November 11, 1992) was an American pole vaulter who won a gold medal at the 1936 Olympics. His winning vault is featured in Leni Riefenstahl's film Olympia.

Meadows had a long rivalry with Bill Sefton, his teammate from the University of Southern California. They shared the AAU title in 1935 and the NCAA title in 1935 and 1936. In May 1937 they both set a new world record at 4.48 m and then at 4.54 m. Meadows set two more world records (indoor) in 1941, winning three more times. In 1948 he cleared 4.42 m, but later finished only sixth at the Olympic trials and thus was left out of the Olympic team. In retirement he ran a musical instrument business in Texas. He was Inducted into the Texas Track and Field Coaches Hall of Fame, Class of 2016.

Records
Preceded by (United States) Bill Sefton	Men's Pole Vault World Record Holder; May 29, 1937 – April 13, 1940	Succeeded by (United States) Cornelius Warmerdam
