= Bill Miller (pole vaulter) =

American pole vaulter (1912–2008)

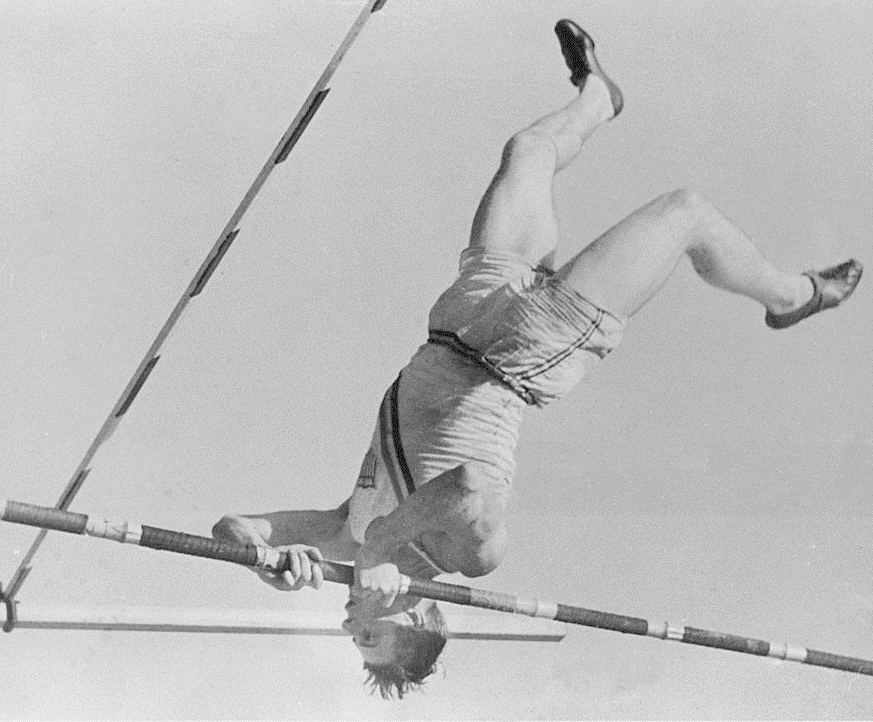
- Miller at the 1932 Summer Olympics

Personal information
- Born: November 1, 1912 Dodge City, Kansas, U.S.
- Died: November 13, 2008 (aged 96) Paradise Valley, Arizona, U.S.
- Height: 1.72 m (5 ft 8 in)
- Weight: 70 kg (154 lb)

Sport
- Sport: Athletics
- Event: Pole vault
- Club: Stanford Cardina

Achievements and titles
- Personal best: 4.31 m (1932)
Medal record
Representing the United States
Olympic Games
Gold medal – first place	1932 Los Angeles	Pole vault

William Waring Miller (November 1, 1912 – November 13, 2008) was an American pole vaulter who won a gold medal at the 1932 Summer Olympics. At the U.S. Olympic trials he finished second (4.30 m) behind Bill Graber, who set a new world record at 4.37 m. Graber failed to clear 4.25 m at the Olympics, while Miller set his all-time personal best at 4.31 m and won, in a close competition with Shuhei Nishida.
