= Roy Lyons =

Australian rules footballer, born 1916

Personal information
- Full name: Roy Francis Lyons
- Born: 28 March 1916; West Melbourne, Victoria
- Died: 31 March 1996 (aged 80)
- Height: 178 cm (5 ft 10 in)
- Weight: 79 kg (174 lb)

Playing career^{1}
Years	Club	Games (Goals)
1937–38, 1940	North Melbourne	12 (6)
- ^{1} Playing statistics correct to the end of 1940.

Roy Francis Lyons (28 March 1916 – 31 March 1996) was an Australian rules footballer who played with North Melbourne in the Victorian Football League (VFL).
