= Sueo Ōe =

Japanese pole vaulter (1914–1941)

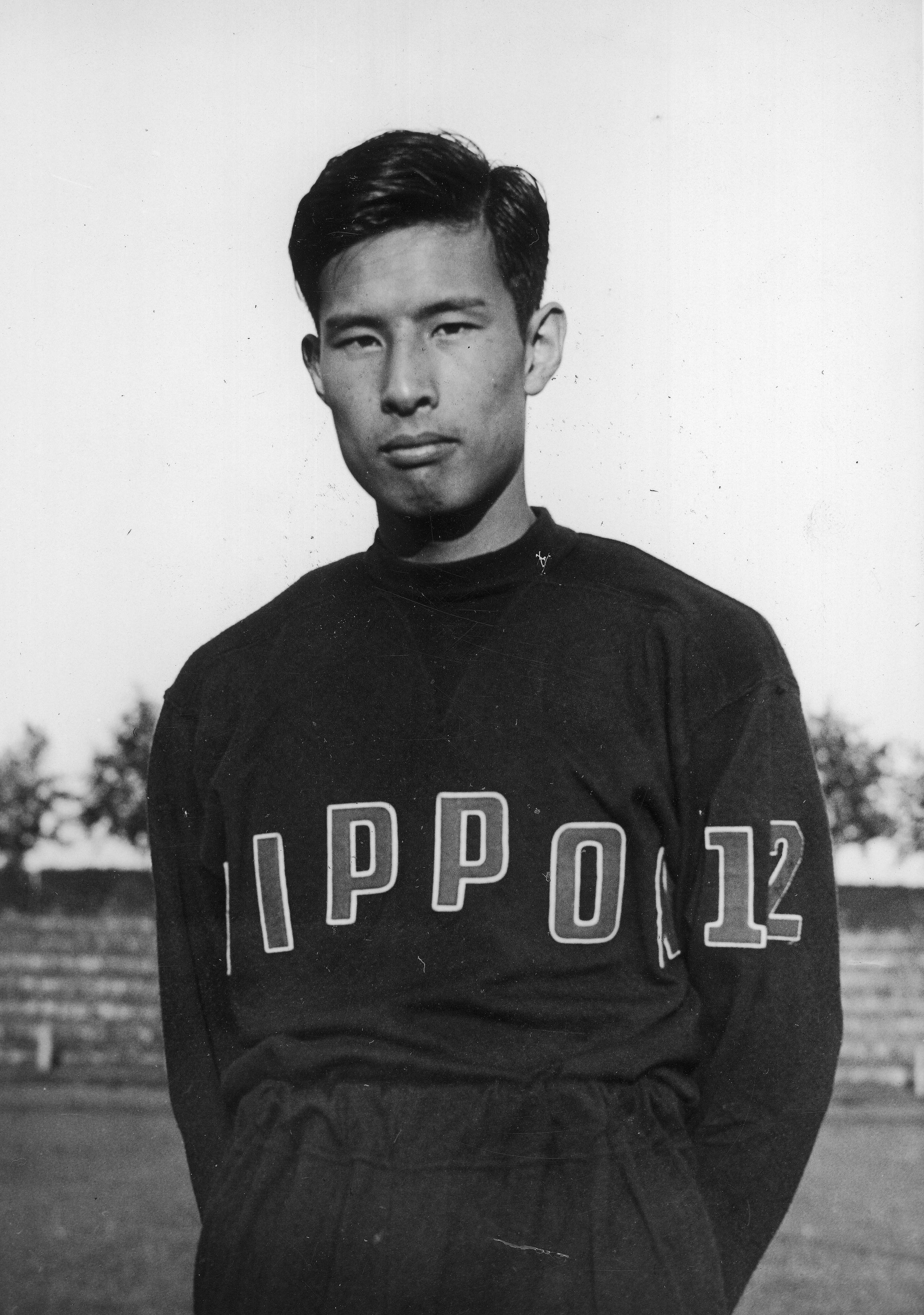

Personal information
- Native name: 大江 季雄
- Nationality: Japanese
- Born: August 2, 1914 Nachikatsuura, Wakayama, Japan
- Died: December 24, 1941 (aged 27) Luzon, Philippines
- Education: Keio University
- Height: 1.72 m (5 ft 8 in)
- Weight: 60 kg (130 lb)

Sport
- Sport: Athletics
- Event: Pole vault
Medal record
Representing Japan
Olympic Games
Bronze medal – third place	1936 Berlin	Pole vault
Far Eastern Championship Games
Gold medal – first place	1934 Manila	Pole vault

Sueo Ōe (大江 季雄, Ōe Sueo; August 2, 1914 – December 24, 1941) was a Japanese athlete who competed mainly in the pole vault. He won a bronze medal at the 1936 Summer Olympics held in Berlin, Germany, tying with his teammate Shuhei Nishida. When the two declined to compete against each other to decide a winner, Nishida was awarded the silver after a decision of the Japanese team, on the basis that Nishida had cleared the height in fewer attempts. On their return to Japan, Nishida and Ōe had their Olympic medals cut in half, and had a jeweler splice together two new medals, half in bronze and half in silver.

A Nishida-Oe silver-bronze medal

In 1937 Ōe set a national record at 4 m 35 cm that stood for 21 years. In 1939 he joined the Imperial Japanese Army and was killed in action in Luzon on December 24, 1941.
