= Moldova Nouă =

- Town
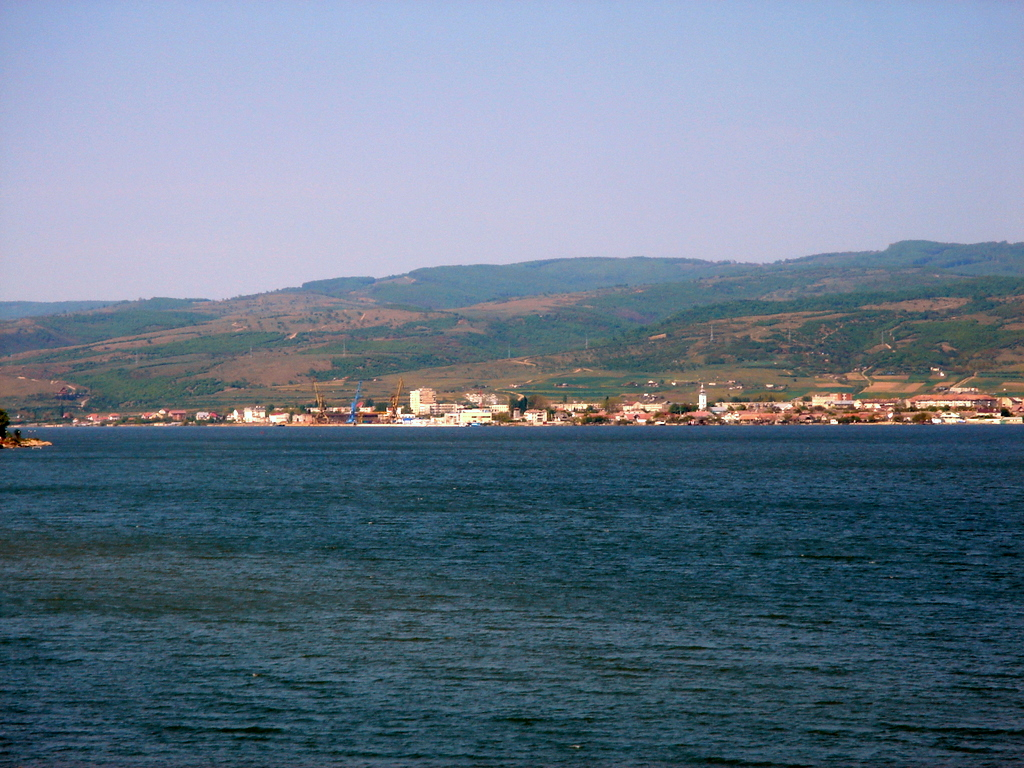
- Moldova Nouă as seen from Serbia, across the Danube

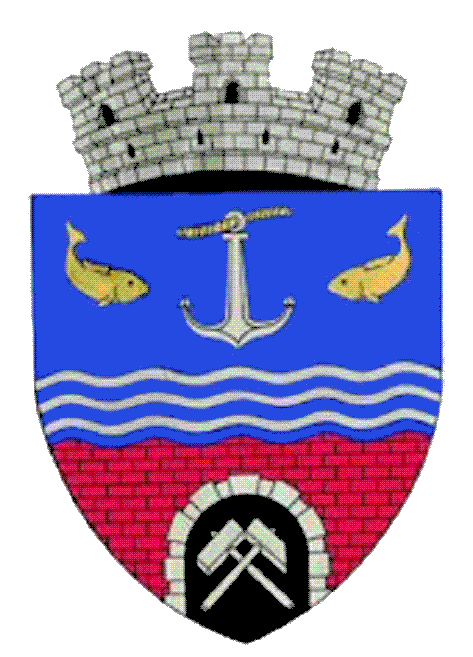
- Coat of arms

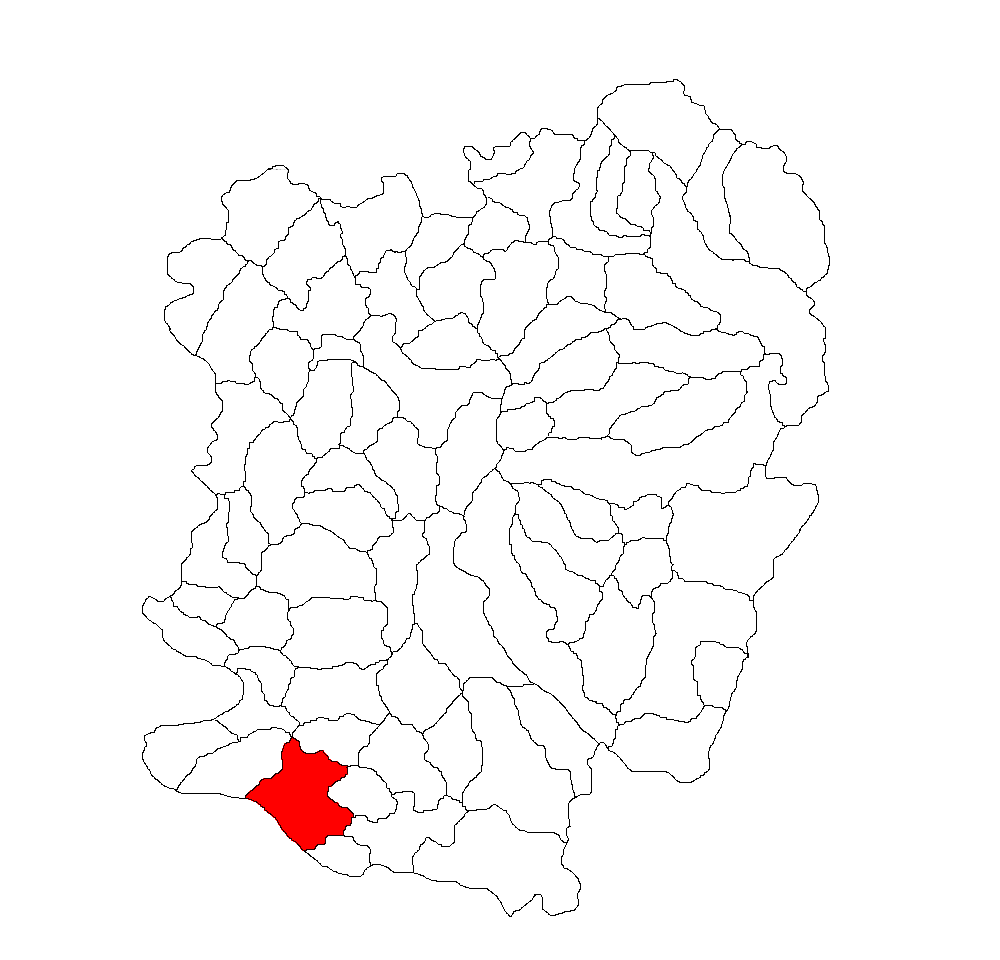
- Location in Caraș-Severin County

- Location in Romania
- Coordinates: 44°43′4″N 21°39′50″E
- Country: Romania
- County: Caraș-Severin

Government
  - Mayor (2024–2028): Adrian-Constantin Forma (PSD)
- Area: 145.84 km^{2} (56.31 sq mi)
- Elevation: 114 m (374 ft)
- Population (2021-12-01): 9,278
  - Density: 63.62/km^{2} (164.8/sq mi)
- Time zone: UTC+02:00 (EET)
  - Summer (DST): UTC+03:00 (EEST)
- Postal code: 325500
- Area code: (+40) 02 55
- Vehicle reg.: CS
- Website: www.moldovanoua.com

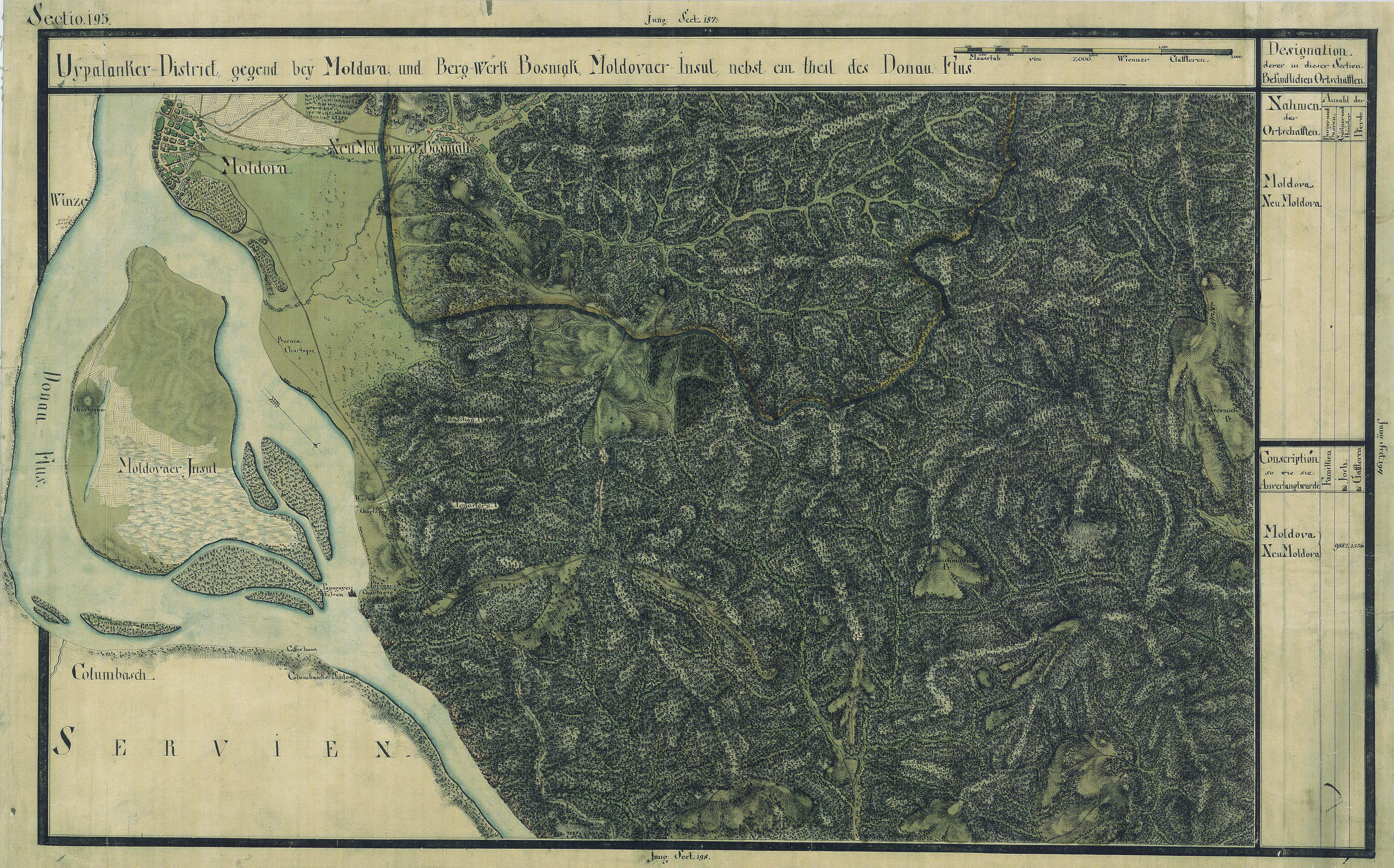
Moldova Nouă (Neu-Moldova) and Moldova Veche (Moldova) on the Josephinian Land Survey, c. 1770

Moldova Nouă (Romanian pronunciation: [molˌdova ˈnowə]; Hungarian: Újmoldova; German: Neumoldowa; Czech: Nová Moldava or Bošňák; Serbian: Нова Молдава or Бошњак, romanized: Nova Moldova or Bošnjak) is a town in southwestern Romania in Caraș-Severin County (the historical region of Banat), in an area known as Clisura Dunării. The town administers three villages: Măcești (Hungarian: Macsevics, Serbian: Мачевић), Moldova Veche (Ómoldova, Стара Молдава), and Moldovița (Kiskárolyfalva, Молдавица).

The town lies on the shores of the river Danube, which separates it from Serbia. It is located at the southern extremity of Caraș-Severin County, 107 km (66 mi) from the county capital, Reșița. It is crossed by national road DN57, which connects it to Oravița, 53 km (33 mi) to the north, and Orșova, 103 km (64 mi) to the east.

== Moldova Veche ==
In Moldova Veche village, evidence of human habitation dating to the transition between the Neolithic and the Bronze Age has been found. Additionally, there exist traces of an unfortified Dacian settlement, similar to several others in the area.

A Roman fort located in the village supervised mining and navigation on the Danube, located in Roman Dacia. The harbour and border buildings partly lie on the ruins of the former fort with the rest below the Danube. The site was seen by the historian Leonard Bohm in the summer of 1879 when the river was low and a thorough examination of the ruins could be made. Moldova Noua was an important Roman mining centre for iron, copper, silver and gold.

Vestiges from the Dark Ages and the Early Middle Ages have been found; during the 10th and 11th centuries, the area was controlled by Glad and later Ahtum. Serbs have been living there since their replacement of the Gepids in the 5th century.

In 1552, when the Banat fell under Ottoman rule, Moldova Veche became the capital of a sanjak within the Temeşvar Eyalet. In 1566, at the end of Suleiman the Magnificent's reign, coins of gold (altâni) and silver (aspri) were minted there. A document of 1588 records the place under the name Mudava; this is the earliest written mention. The Slavicizied Germanic-origin toponym is still used by locals. Bogdan Petriceicu Hasdeu and the majority of Romanian philologists and historians claim that the name comes from the term of Germanic origin mulde (i.e., "hollow", "quarry" or "drainage"). In 1718, the area came under the Habsburg monarchy's control.

The village was absorbed into Moldova Nouă in 1956. It is the site of a Danube port. There is a Baptist church; the community was established in 1927, its first church built in 1967 and the present structure in 2001. Adherents are both Romanian and Serbian, with services conducted in Romanian.

== Demographics ==
In 1910, out of 3,437 inhabitants, 2,934 were ethnic Romanians, 295 Germans, 91 Hungarians, 41 Serbs and 73 Czechs; 3,004 where belonging to Orthodoxy, 389 where Roman Catholic and 25 where Reformed.

At the 2011 census, 81.2% of inhabitants were Romanians, 12.8% Serbs, 3.2% Roma, 1.3% Hungarians, and 0.8% Czechs. At the 2002 census, 88.4% were Romanian Orthodox, 4.5% Baptist, 4% Roman Catholic, and 2% Pentecostal.

Historical population
Year	Pop.	±%
1956	3,582	—
1966	6,192	+72.9%
1977	15,973	+158.0%
1992	16,874	+5.6%
2002	15,112	−10.4%
2011	12,350	−18.3%
Source: Census data

== Natives ==
- Ștefan Blănaru (born 1989), Romanian footballer
- Alin Dobrosavlevici (born 1994), Romanian footballer
- Emilijan Josimović (1823–1897), Serbian urbanist
- Iasmin Latovlevici (born 1986), Romanian footballer
- Mihai Mutascu (born 1974), university professor
- Mihăiță Pleșan (born 1983), Romanian footballer
- Anca Pop (1984–2018), Romanian-Canadian singer-songwriter
- Cosmin Sârbu (born 1996), Romanian footballer
- Deian Sorescu (born 1997), Romanian footballer
- Clara Vădineanu (born 1986), Romanian handballer
- Ella Zeller (born 1933), Romanian table tennis player
- Viktor Zsuffka (born 1910), Hungarian pole vaulter

== Climate ==
Moldova Nouă has a humid continental climate (Cfb in the Köppen climate classification).

Climate data for Moldova Veche (altitude 82m, 2014–2026 normals, extremes 1981–present)
Month	Jan	Feb	Mar	Apr	May	Jun	Jul	Aug	Sep	Oct	Nov	Dec	Year
Record high °C (°F)	20.3 (68.5)	22.0 (71.6)	29.2 (84.6)	31.4 (88.5)	35.3 (95.5)	38.9 (102.0)	44.0 (111.2)	41.7 (107.1)	38.0 (100.4)	32.6 (90.7)	26.5 (79.7)	18.5 (65.3)	44.0 (111.2)
Mean daily maximum °C (°F)	5.2 (41.4)	9.3 (48.7)	13.9 (57.0)	18.9 (66.0)	23.1 (73.6)	28.8 (83.8)	30.9 (87.6)	31.1 (88.0)	25.8 (78.4)	18.9 (66.0)	12.1 (53.8)	7.1 (44.8)	18.8 (65.8)
Daily mean °C (°F)	1.8 (35.2)	4.9 (40.8)	8.7 (47.7)	12.8 (55.0)	17.3 (63.1)	22.3 (72.1)	24.1 (75.4)	24.2 (75.6)	19.8 (67.6)	13.9 (57.0)	8.6 (47.5)	3.9 (39.0)	13.5 (56.3)
Mean daily minimum °C (°F)	−1.6 (29.1)	0.6 (33.1)	3.4 (38.1)	6.8 (44.2)	11.4 (52.5)	15.7 (60.3)	17.3 (63.1)	17.2 (63.0)	13.7 (56.7)	8.9 (48.0)	5.1 (41.2)	0.8 (33.4)	8.3 (46.9)
Record low °C (°F)	−21.9 (−7.4)	−18.6 (−1.5)	−15.0 (5.0)	−3.8 (25.2)	1.4 (34.5)	6.0 (42.8)	8.3 (46.9)	7.7 (45.9)	0.8 (33.4)	−3.8 (25.2)	−9.0 (15.8)	−19.8 (−3.6)	−21.9 (−7.4)
Average precipitation mm (inches)	48.5 (1.91)	30.1 (1.19)	42.4 (1.67)	46.8 (1.84)	88.5 (3.48)	80.0 (3.15)	68.8 (2.71)	47.3 (1.86)	50.2 (1.98)	46.1 (1.81)	50.7 (2.00)	38.5 (1.52)	637.9 (25.12)
Average precipitation days (≥ 1.0 mm)	8.8	6.5	6.9	7.3	10.2	7.6	6.3	5.1	6.1	6.4	8.2	7.2	86.6
Average snowy days	6.0	2.2	1.1	0	0	0	0	0	0	0	0.7	2.0	12
Source: Meteomanz (2014-2026); Infoclimat (1980-2010)

== Notes ==
- Aleksandra Djurić-Milovanović, "Serbs in Romania: Relationship between Ethnic and Religious Identity", Balcanica XLIII (2012), pp. 117–142
