= Kiyoshi Adachi (pole vaulter) =

Japanese pole vaulter

Personal information
- Nationality: Japanese
- Born: 30 June 1914
- Height: 1.79 m (5 ft 10 in)
- Weight: 60 kg (130 lb)

Sport
- Sport: Athletics
- Event: Pole vault

Achievements and titles
- Olympic finals: 1936 Summer Olympics

Kiyoshi Adachi (Kanji:安達 清; born 30 June 1914, date of death unknown) was a Japanese pole vaulter. He competed in the 1936 Summer Olympics.
