= Shuhei Nishida =

Japanese pole vaulter (1910–1997)

Shūhei Nishida
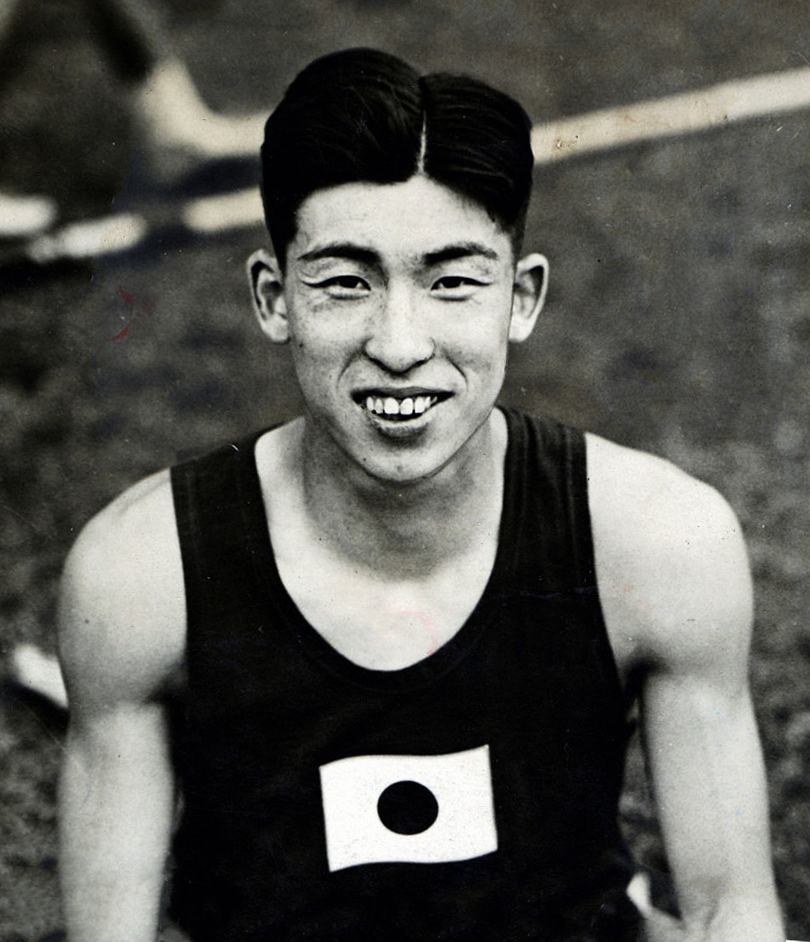
- Nishida c. 1930s

Personal information
- Native name: 西田 修平
- Nationality: Japanese
- Born: March 21, 1910 Nachikatsuura, Wakayama, Japan
- Died: April 13, 1997 (aged 87) Tokyo, Japan
- Education: Waseda University
- Height: 1.76 m (5 ft 9 in)
- Weight: 61 kg (134 lb)

Sport
- Sport: Athletics
- Event: Pole vault
Medal record
Representing Japan
Olympic Games
Silver medal – second place	1932 Los Angeles	Pole vault
Silver medal – second place	1936 Berlin	Pole vault
Asian Games
Bronze medal – third place	1951 New Delhi	Pole vault

Shuhei Nishida (西田 修平, Nishida Shūhei; March 21, 1910 – April 13, 1997) was a Japanese Olympic athlete who competed mainly in the pole vault.

Nishida was born in what is now part of Nachikatsuura, Wakayama Prefecture, Japan. He was a student of the Engineering Department at Waseda University, when selected as a member of the Japanese Olympic team for the 1932 Summer Olympics in Los Angeles, where he won the silver medal in the pole vault event.

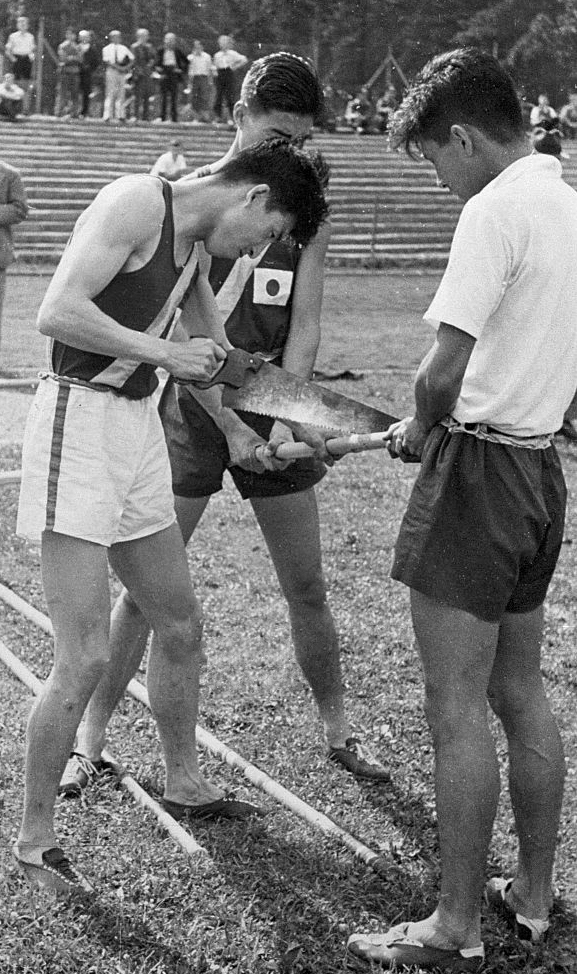
Shuhei Nishida (left), Sueo Oe and Kiyoshi Adachi are adjusting a pole at the 1936 Olympics

A Nishida-Oe silver-bronze medal

After graduation from Waseda University, he obtained a job at Hitachi. He subsequently participated in the 1936 Summer Olympics held in Berlin, Germany where he repeated his performance winning a second silver medal in the same event tying with his friend and teammate Sueo Oe. When the two declined to compete against each other to decide a winner, Nishida was awarded the silver and Oe the bronze by decision of the Japanese team, on the basis that Nishida had cleared the height in fewer attempts. The competition was featured in a scene in the documentary Olympia, filmed by Leni Riefenstahl. On their return to Japan, Nishida and Oe famously had their Olympic medals cut in half, and had a jeweler splice together two new “friendship medals”, half in bronze and half in silver.

At the age of 41, Nishida won a bronze medal at the 1951 Asian Games. He remained active in sports all of his life, serving as a referee at events, and from 1959 as an honorary vice chairman of the Japan Association of Athletics Federations, and as a member of the Japanese Olympic Committee. In 1989, he was awarded the silver medal of the Olympic Order. Nishida died of heart failure in 1997 at the age of 87.
