= George Varoff =

American pole vaulter (1914–2002)

George Dimitri Varoff
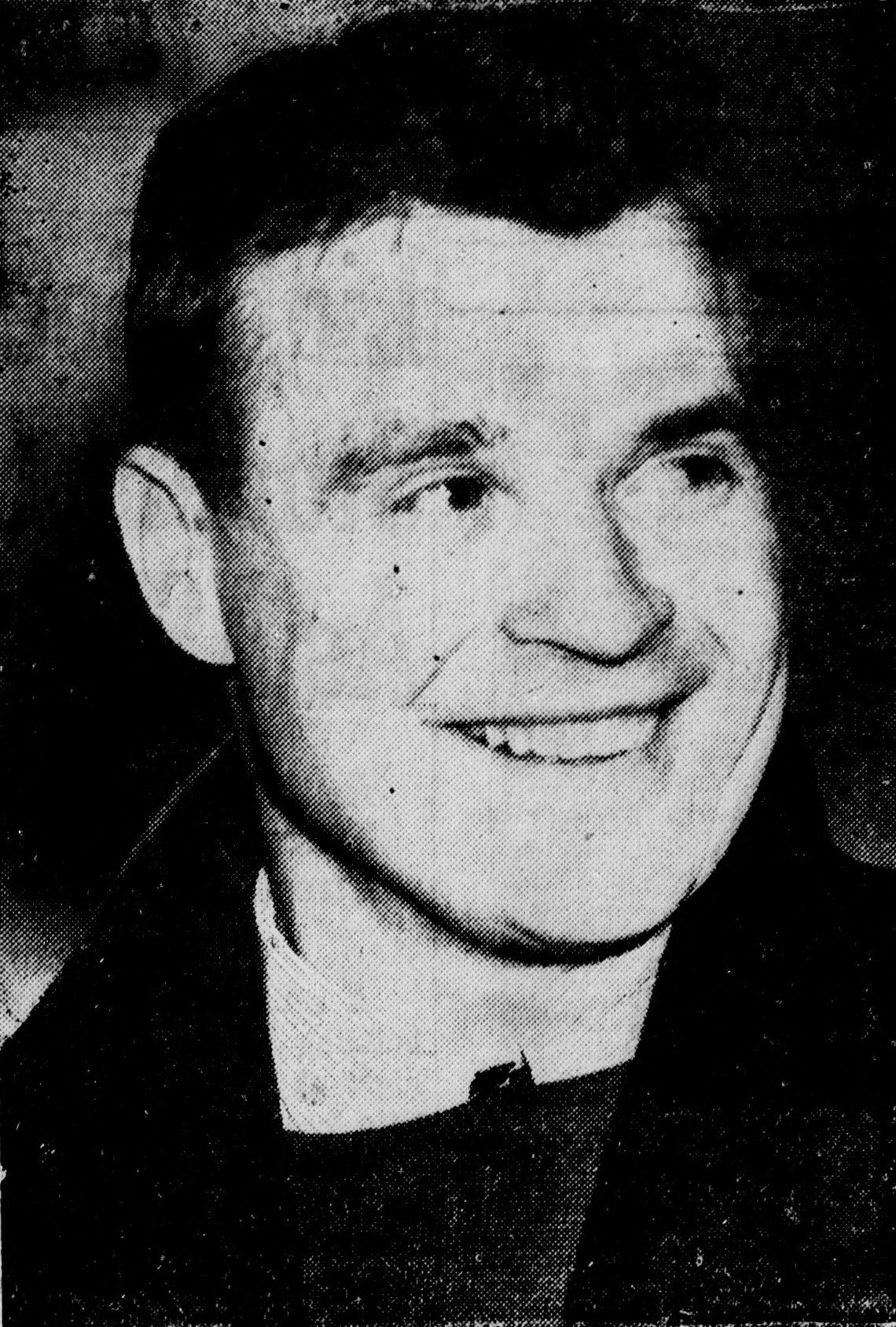

Personal information
- Born: March 25, 1914 Hawaii, U.S.
- Died: January 10, 2002 (aged 87) San Antonio, Texas, U.S.

Sport
- Sport: Athletics
- Event: Pole vault

George Dimitri Varoff (March 25, 1914 – January 10, 2002) was an American pole vaulter.

== Early life ==
Varoff was born in Hawaii to Ukrainian immigrants and grew up in San Francisco, where he competed for Balboa High School. After high school, he attended the University of Oregon to train under track coach Bill Hayward.

== World record ==
On July 4, 1936, Varoff vaulted 14 ft 6 1/2 in (4.43 m) at the Amateur Athletic Union (AAU)'s national championship meet, setting a new world record. However, the Olympic Trials were held separately the following week; at the Trials, Varoff only placed fourth and failed to qualify for the United States team for the 1936 Olympics. Varoff won the AAU championship again in 1939; he set his personal best, 14 ft 7 5/8 in (4.46 m), at the 1937 AAU meet, but lost on countback as three other men also cleared the same height. With the cancellation of the 1940 and 1944 Olympics due to World War II, he never competed in the Olympics.

== World War II ==
Varoff joined the United States Army Air Forces during World War II and achieved the rank of captain. His B-29 was shot down over China and reported as missing in action on December 7, 1944. He returned safely to his base six weeks later. He later reported that he and his crew had been on a bombing mission.

== Legacy ==
Following the war, Varoff returned to San Francisco. He was inducted into the Oregon Sports Hall of Fame in 1982. He died in San Antonio, Texas, on January 10, 2002.
