= Athletics at the 1928 Summer Olympics – Men's pole vault =

Men's pole vault at the Games of the IX Olympiad
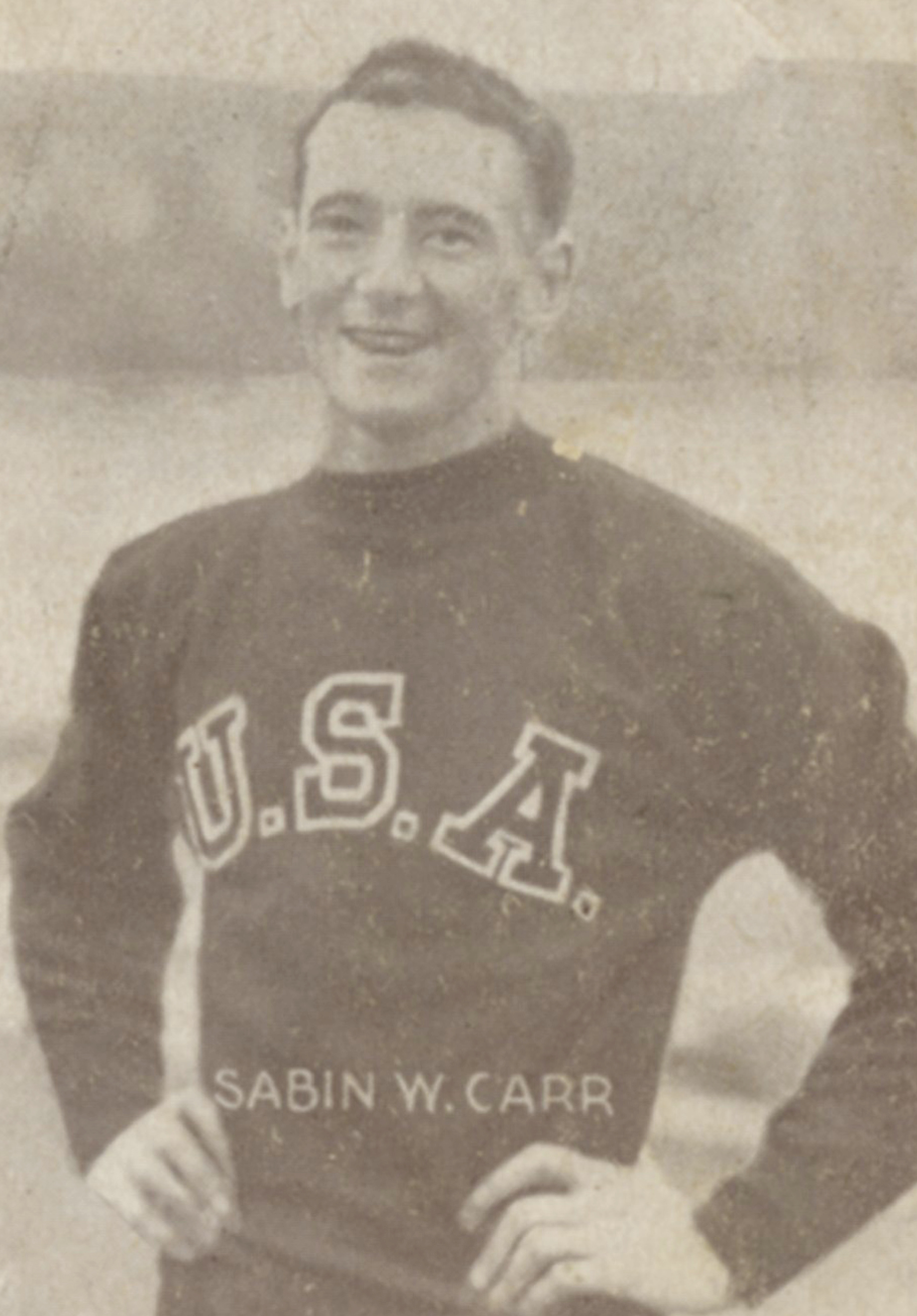
- Sabin Carr (c. 1930)
- Venue: Olympic Stadium
- Date: August 1, 1928
- Competitors: 20 from 13 nations
- Winning height: 4.20 OR

Medalists
1st place, gold medalist(s)		Sabin Carr	United States
2nd place, silver medalist(s)		William Droegemuller	United States
3rd place, bronze medalist(s)		Charles McGinnis	United States

The men's pole vault event at the 1928 Olympic Games took place on August 1. Twenty athletes from thirteen nations competed. The maximum number of athletes per nation was four. The event was won by Sabin Carr of the United States, for the nation's eighth consecutive victory in the men's pole vault. Americans William Droegemuller and Charles McGinnis won silver and bronze respectively, giving Team USA their second consecutive and third overall medal sweep in the Olympic pole vault event.

== Background ==
This was the eighth appearance of the event, which is one of 12 athletics events to have been held at every Summer Olympics. The returning finalists from the 1924 Games were gold medalist Lee Barnes of the United States, fifth-place finisher Victor Pickard of Canada, and seventh-place finisher Maurice Henrijean of Belgium. Sabin Carr of the United States had been the first to break 14 feet, in 1927, but Barnes had broken Carr's record in 1928 and was favored to repeat.

Japan and Spain each made their first appearance in the event. The United States made its eighth appearance, the only nation to have competed at every Olympic men's pole vault to that point.

== Competition format ==
The competition continued to use the two-round format introduced in 1912, with results cleared between rounds. Vaulters received three attempts at each height.

In the qualifying round, the bar was set at 3.30 metres, 3.50 metres, and 3.66 metres. All vaulters clearing 3.66 metres advanced to the final.

In the final, the bar was set at 3.50 metres, 3.65 metres, 3.80 metres, 3.90 metres, and then increased by 5 centimetres at a time.

== Records ==
These were the standing world and Olympic records (in metres) prior to the 1928 Summer Olympics.

World record	Lee Barnes (USA)	4.30	Fresno, United States	28 April 1928
Olympic record	Frank Foss (USA)	4.09	Antwerp, Belgium	20 August 1920

Sabin Carr and William Droegemuller both succeeded at 4.10 metres, breaking the Olympic record. Carr was able to extent the new record to 4.20 metres.

== Schedule ==
Date	Time	Round
Wednesday, 1 August 1928	Unknown; 16:00	Qualifying; Final

== Results ==
Key

- o = Height cleared
- x = Height failed
- – = Height passed
- r = Retired
- SB = Season's best
- PB = Personal best
- NR = National record
- AR = Area record
- OR = Olympic record
- WR = World record
- WL = World lead
- NM = No mark
- DNS = Did not start
- DQ = Disqualified

=== Qualifying round ===
All athletes clearing 3.66 metres advanced to the final. Jump sequences are not known.

Rank	Athlete	Nation	3.30	3.50	3.66	Height	Notes
1	Lee Barnes	United States	o	o	o	3.66	Q
1	Sabin Carr	United States	o	o	o	3.66	Q
1	William Droegemuller	United States	o	o	o	3.66	Q
1	János Karlovits	Hungary	o	o	o	3.66	Q
1	Henry Lindblad	Sweden	o	o	o	3.66	Q
1	Charles McGinnis	United States	o	o	o	3.66	Q
1	Julius Müller	Germany	o	o	o	3.66	Q
1	Yonetaro Nakazawa	Japan	o	o	o	3.66	Q
1	Victor Pickard	Canada	o	o	o	3.66	Q
10	Laurence Bond	Great Britain	o	o	xxx	3.50	
10	José Culí	Spain	o	o	xxx	3.50	
10	Maurice Henrijean	Belgium	o	o	xxx	3.50	
10	Aksel Nikolajsen	Denmark	o	o	xxx	3.50	
14	Stelios Benardis	Greece	o	xxx	—	3.30	
14	Gérard Noël	Belgium	o	xxx	—	3.30	
14	Age van der Zee	Netherlands	o	xxx	—	3.30	
—	René Joannes-Powell	Belgium	xxx	—		No mark	
—	Argyris Karagiannis	Greece	xxx	—		No mark	
—	Pierre Ramadier	France	xxx	—		No mark	
—	Robert Vintousky	France	xxx	—		No mark	

=== Final ===
There was a jump-off for third place between McGinnis, Pickard, and Barnes, who had all achieved 3.95 metres but not 4.00 metres. In the jump-off, McGinnis was the only one to succeed at 4.10 metres, so he received the bronze medal. Pickard was able to repeat at 3.95 metres, while Barnes was not, so Pickard took fourth place and Barnes took fifth place.

Rank	Athlete	Nation	3.50	3.65	3.80	3.90	3.95	4.00	4.10	4.15	4.20	4.31	Height	Notes
1st place, gold medalist(s)	Sabin Carr	United States	o	o	o	o	xxo	o	o	o	o	xxx	4.20	OR
2nd place, silver medalist(s)	William Droegemuller	United States	o	o	o	o	xxo	o	o	xxx	—		4.10	
3rd place, bronze medalist(s)	Charles McGinnis	United States	o	o	o	o	o	xxx	—				3.95	
4	Victor Pickard	Canada	o	o	o	o	o	xxx	—				3.95	
5	Lee Barnes	United States	o	o	o	o	o	xxx	—				3.95	
6	Yonetaro Nakazawa	Japan	o	o	o	xo	xxx	—					3.90	
7	Henry Lindblad	Sweden	o	o	o	xxo	xxx	—					3.90	
8	János Karlovits	Hungary	o	o	o	xxx	—						3.80	
9	Julius Müller	Germany	o	o	xxx	—							3.65	
