= Fred Sturdy =

American pole vaulter (1908–1972)

Frederic Harry Sturdy (January 25, 1908 – August 4, 1972) was an American pole vaulter. One of the first vaulters to clear 14 feet, Sturdy was U.S. outdoor champion in 1929 and 1930 and indoor champion from 1929 to 1932.

== Athletic career ==
Originally from Los Angeles, Sturdy studied at Yale University, which had a long pole vault tradition. He was coached by Yale's assistant track coach Al McGall and former champion vaulter A.C. Gilbert; Sabin Carr, the 1928 Olympic champion and the first man to vault 14 ft (4.26 m), was a year ahead of Sturdy and also helped him. Sturdy developed steadily, but was overshadowed by Carr until the latter graduated; he placed third at the 1927 IC4A indoor championships as Carr won, and in 1928 was runner-up to Carr in the indoor IC4A meet and tied for third behind Carr and USC's Lee Barnes outdoors. Sturdy competed at the 1928 U.S. Olympic Trials, but failed to qualify for the Olympics in Amsterdam; the United States had the best pole vaulters in the world, and track historian Richard Hymans wrote that both Sturdy and Stanford's Ward Edmonds, who also failed to qualify, "would have been automatic selections for any other country." The American team of Carr, Barnes, Bill Droegemueller and Charles McGinnis swept the medals at the Olympics.

With Carr graduating before the 1929 season, Sturdy became Yale's new top vaulter. At the New York Athletic Club games in Madison Square Garden on February 18, 1929, he vaulted 14 feet (4.26 m), becoming only the second man (after Carr) to clear that height indoors; he took three attempts at 14 ft 1 1/2 in (4.30 m), which would have been a new world record, but failed. Later that winter, Sturdy won ahead of decathlete Barney Berlinger at both the IC4A and national (AAU) indoor championships; his IC4A winning mark, 13 ft 7 3/4 in (4.15 m), broke Carr's meeting record from the previous year. Sturdy remained in good shape outdoors, again winning both the AAU and IC4A titles; in the IC4A meet he shared first place with Edmonds and USC's Jack Williams, as all three cleared at 13 ft 9 in (4.19 m) and there was no jump-off. He won the AAU championship outright, clearing 13 ft 9 1/4 in to improve the meeting record set at the previous year's Olympic Trials by a quarter-inch.

After graduating in 1929 Sturdy competed for the Los Angeles Athletic Club, although he stayed at Yale for postgraduate education. During the 1930 indoor season he injured his leg and his shape for the AAU indoor championships was considered doubtful, but he successfully defended his title, defeating Northwestern's Tommy Warne in a jump-off after both had cleared 13 ft 9 in to tie for first. Sturdy also repeated as AAU outdoor champion, again after a jump-off against Warne; he won the jump-off by default after Warne sprained his ankle and conceded the title.

Sturdy won two more AAU indoor titles in 1931 and 1932; his 1931 winning mark, 13 ft 11 in (4.24 m), was his best since the 14-foot jump in February 1929. At the 1932 Olympic Trials in Palo Alto Sturdy cleared 13 ft 10 in (4.22 m), which was his outdoor lifetime best; however, it only placed him in a four-way tie for third. After a jump-off, third place (and the final Olympic qualifying spot) went to UCLA's George Jefferson, and Sturdy was again left out of the team.
