= Athletics at the 1924 Summer Olympics – Men's pole vault =

Men's pole vault at the Games of the VIII Olympiad
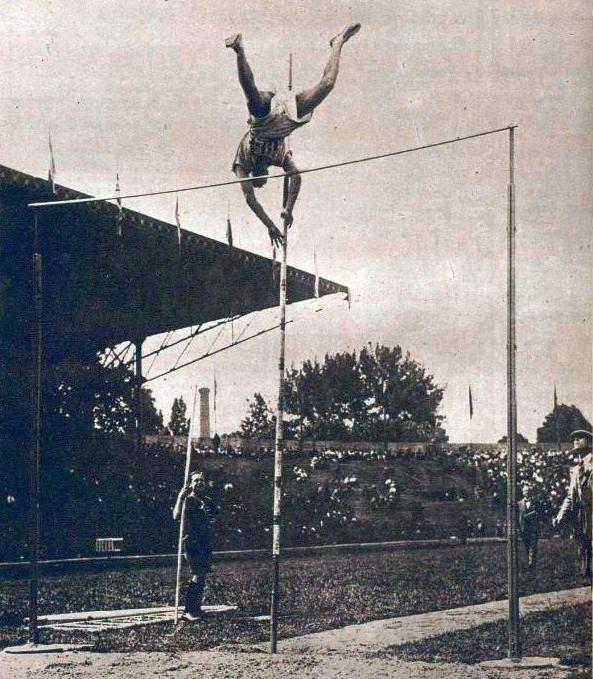
- Lee Barnes vaulting
- Venue: Stade Olympique Yves-du-Manoir
- Dates: July 9, 1924 (qualifying); July 10, 1924 (final)
- Competitors: 20 from 13 nations
- Winning height: 3.95

Medalists
1st place, gold medalist(s)		Lee Barnes; United States
2nd place, silver medalist(s)		Glen Graham; United States
3rd place, bronze medalist(s)		James Brooker; United States

The men's pole vault event was part of the track and field athletics programme at the 1924 Summer Olympics. The competition was held on Wednesday, July 9, 1924, on Thursday, July 10, 1924. Twenty pole vaulters from 13 nations competed. The maximum number of athletes per nation was 4. The event was won by Lee Barnes of the United States, the nation's seventh consecutive victory in the men's pole vault. Americans Glen Graham (silver) and James Brooker (bronze) completed the sweep, the second time (after 1904) the United States had done so—though the Americans had taken two golds and a bronze in 1908 and a gold, two silvers, and a bronze in 1912.

== Background ==
This was the seventh appearance of the event, which is one of 12 athletics events to have been held at every Summer Olympics. The only returning finalist from the 1920 Games was silver medalist Henry Petersen of Denmark. The biggest threat to American dominance of the event was Charles Hoff of Norway, the world record holder; however, he was injured and did not compete in the pole vault. Ralph Spearow was the top American coming into the event.

Brazil, Czechoslovakia, Great Britain, and Poland each made their first appearance in the event. The United States made its seventh appearance, the only nation to have competed at every Olympic men's pole vault to that point.

== Competition format ==
The competition continued to use the two-round format introduced in 1912, with results cleared between rounds. Vaulters received three attempts at each height.

In the qualifying round, all vaulters clearing 3.66 metres advanced to the final.

== Records ==
These were the standing world and Olympic records (in metres) prior to the 1924 Summer Olympics.

World record	Charles Hoff (NOR)	4.21	Copenhagen, Denmark	22 July 1923
Olympic record	Frank Foss (USA)	4.09	Antwerp, Belgium	20 August 1920

No new world or Olympic records were set during the competition.

== Schedule ==
Date	Time	Round
Wednesday, 9 July 1924	14:00	Qualifying
Thursday, 10 July 1924	14:30	Final

== Results ==
The current world record holder at that time [Charles Hoff] did not participate in this competition due to an injured ankle.

=== Qualifying ===
The qualification was held on Wednesday, July 9, 1924, and started at 2:00 p.m. All pole vaulters who were able to clear 3.66 metres qualified for the final. The jumping order and the jumping series are not available.

Rank	Athlete	Nation	Height	Notes
1	Lee Barnes	United States	3.66	Q
1	James Brooker	United States	3.66	Q
1	Glenn Graham	United States	3.66	Q
1	Maurice Henrijean	Belgium	3.66	Q
1	Henry Petersen	Denmark	3.66	Q
1	Victor Pickard	Canada	3.66	Q
1	Ralph Spearow	United States	3.66	Q
8	Paul Dufauret	France	3.55	
8	Irvine Francis	Canada	3.55	
8	Maurice Vautier	France	3.55	
11	Robert Duthil	France	3.40	
11	Eurico de Freitas	Brazil	3.40	
11	Harry de Keijser	Netherlands	3.40	
11	Marcel Muzard	France	3.40	
15	Stefan Adamczak	Poland	3.20	
15	James Campbell	Great Britain	3.20	
15	Valter Ever	Estonia	3.20	
15	František Fuhrherr-Nový	Czechoslovakia	3.20	
15	Yrjö Helander	Finland	3.20	
15	Argyris Karagiannis	Greece	3.20	

=== Final ===
The final was held on Thursday, July 10, 1924, and started at 2:30 p.m. The jumping order and the jumping series are not available.

Barnes won the gold medal in a jump-off beating Graham. Brooker won the bronze medal in a jump-off beating Petersen.

Rank	Athlete	Nation	Height
1st place, gold medalist(s)	Lee Barnes	United States	3.95
2nd place, silver medalist(s)	Glenn Graham	United States	3.95
3rd place, bronze medalist(s)	James Brooker	United States	3.90
4	Henry Petersen	Denmark	3.90
5	Victor Pickard	Canada	3.80
6	Ralph Spearow	United States	3.70
—	Maurice Henrijean	Belgium	No mark
