= Ralph Spearow =

American pole vaulter (1895–1980)

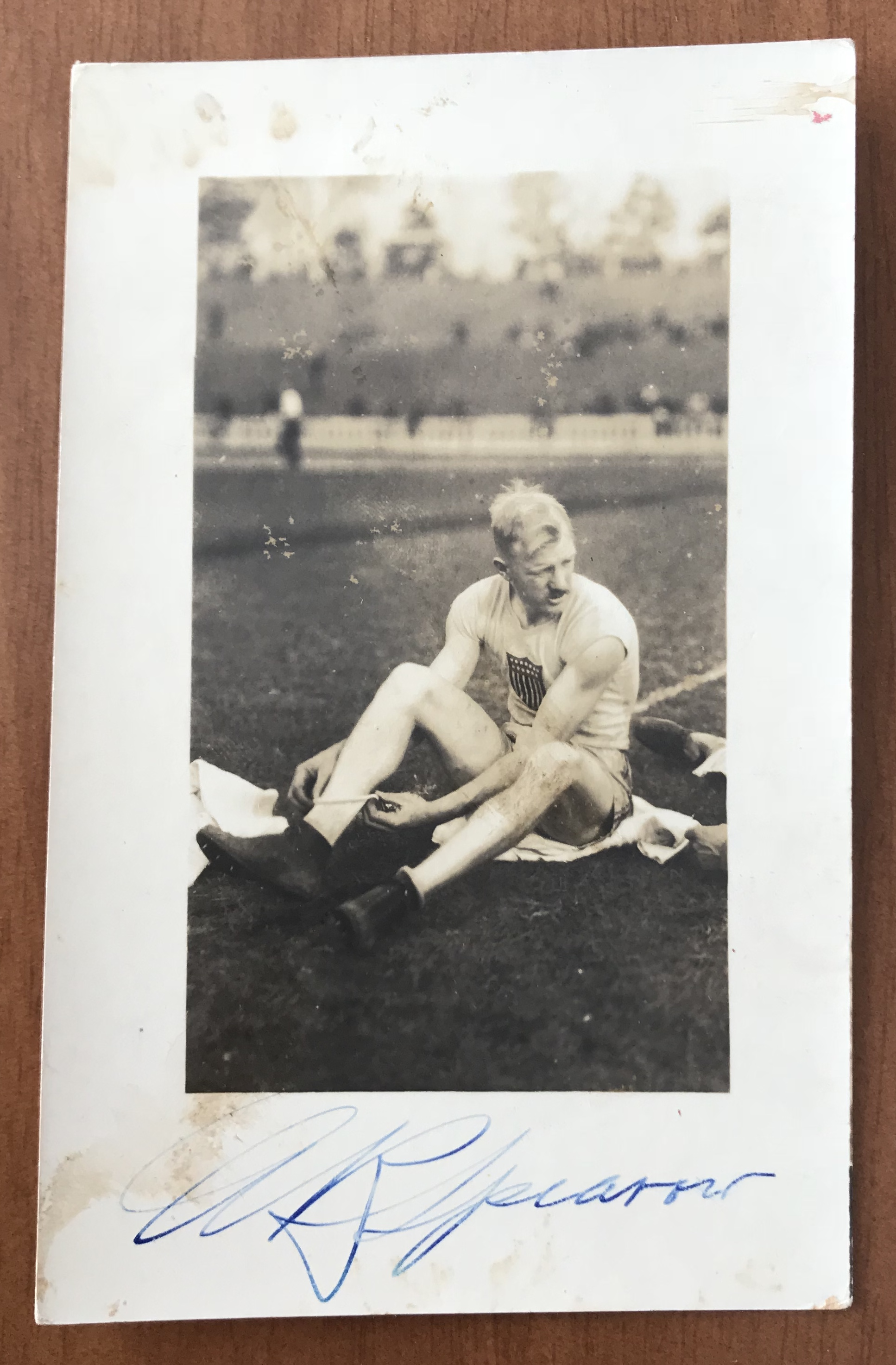

Personal information
- Born: October 3, 1895 LaGrange, Georgia, U.S.
- Died: December 17, 1980 (aged 85) Portland, Oregon, U.S.

Sport
- Sport: Athletics

Albert Ralph Spearow (October 3, 1895 – December 17, 1980) was an American pole vaulter. He placed 6th in his speciality at the 1924 Summer Olympics in Paris; later that year, he exceeded Charles Hoff's world record in Tokyo, but his mark was never ratified.

== Biography ==
Spearow was born in LaGrange, Georgia, but became an athlete in Oregon, competing first for Multnomah AC and then the Oregon Ducks. Spearow was a versatile jumper, excelling not only in the pole vault but also the long jump and the high jump. While at the University of Oregon, he was also the regular pastor of the First Presbyterian Church in Cottage Grove; after graduating, he left that post to become an insurance agent.

Spearow placed 4th in the pole vault at the 1919 national (AAU) championship meet and became one of the first jumpers to clear 13 feet (3.96 m) in 1920. In 1922 he placed 2nd at the AAU championships, losing only in a jump-off to Edward Knourek.

Spearow's best year was 1924, when he first broke the intercollegiate record with a jump of 13 feet 2.95 inches (4.0373 m) and then qualified for the US Olympic team. At the Olympic Trials in Cambridge, Massachusetts, Spearow and three others - Lee Barnes, James Brooker and Glenn Graham - cleared 13 feet (3.96 m) to qualify for the Olympics. Of the four, Spearow had the best attempts at 13 feet 4 inches (4.06 m), getting over the bar twice but brushing it off on the way down both times. In the absence of Norway's world record holder Charles Hoff, Spearow entered the Olympics as the leading favorite. However, he injured his ankle in training ahead of the competition and only managed a disappointing 6th.

After the Olympics, Spearow embarked on an exhibition and coaching tour in Japan with several fellow athletes. Near the end of the tour on November 5, in a meeting in Tokyo, Spearow had the best performances of his career, clearing first 13 feet 6 inches (4.11 m) and then 13 feet 10 1/2 inches (4.23 m); the latter height exceeded Hoff's official world record of 4.21 meters. Spearow's jump has appeared in many listings of world record progressions since but has never received official recognition from the International Association of Athletics Federations.

Why the jump wasn't ratified as a record is unclear, with both contemporary and later sources providing contradictory explanations. Bill Bowerman claimed the jump was statistically valid but Spearow's lack of an AAU permit to compete prevented ratification. Track and field historian Richard Hymans quotes eyewitness Jonni Myyrä as saying the height Spearow cleared was found to be below the world record on remeasurement; however, Martti Jukola, also citing Myyrä as his source, claimed Spearow failed on his three official attempts and only made the height on an additional exhibition jump. The November 19, 1924 edition of the Eugene Guard referred to Spearow "unofficially" breaking the record, while the November 21 edition said Spearow "tried for a world's vault record but failed by a scant margin."

Spearow died in Portland, Oregon on December 17, 1980.
