= 1934 European Athletics Championships – Men's pole vault =

Men's pole vault at the European Athletics Championships

The men's pole vault at the 1934 European Athletics Championships was held in Turin, Italy, at the Stadio Benito Mussolini on 7 September 1934.

== Medalists ==
| Gold | Gustav Wegner; Germany |
| Silver | Bo Ljungberg; Sweden |
| Bronze | John Lindroth; Finland |

== Results ==
=== Final ===
7 September

| Rank | Name | Nationality | Result | Notes |
|---|---|---|---|---|
| 1st place, gold medalist(s) | Gustav Wegner | Germany | 4.00 | CR |
| 2nd place, silver medalist(s) | Bo Ljungberg | Sweden | 4.00 | CR |
| 3rd place, bronze medalist(s) | John Lindroth | Finland | 3.90 | |
| 4 | Viktor Zsuffka | Hungary | 3.90 | |
| 5 | Pierre Ramadier | France | 3.90 | |
| 6 | Danilo Innocenti | Italy | 3.80 | |
| 7 | Robert Vintousky | France | 3.80 | |
| 7 | Henry Lindblad | Sweden | 3.80 | |
| 7 | Eevald Äärma | Estonia | 3.80 | NR |
| 10 | Adolf Meier | Switzerland | 3.70 | |
| 10 | Lyuben Doychev | Bulgaria | 3.70 | |

=== Qualification ===
7 September

| Rank | Name | Nationality | Result | Notes |
|---|---|---|---|---|
| 1 | Eevald Äärma | Estonia | 3.60 | Q |
| 1 | Danilo Innocenti | Italy | 3.60 | Q |
| 1 | John Lindroth | Finland | 3.60 | Q |
| 1 | Robert Vintousky | France | 3.60 | Q |
| 1 | Bo Ljungberg | Sweden | 3.60 | Q |
| 1 | Lyuben Doychev | Bulgaria | 3.60 | Q |
| 1 | Henry Lindblad | Sweden | 3.60 | Q |
| 1 | Viktor Zsuffka | Hungary | 3.60 | Q |
| 9 | Gustav Wegner | Germany | 3.60 | Q |
| 9 | Pierre Ramadier | France | 3.60 | Q |
| 11 | Adolf Meier | Switzerland | 3.60 | Q |

== Participation ==
According to an unofficial count, 11 athletes from 9 countries participated in the event.

- Bulgaria (1)
- Estonia (1)
- Finland (1)
- France (2)
- Germany (1)
- Hungary (1)
- Italy (1)
- Sweden (2)
- Switzerland (1)
