= Al McGall =

American football and track and field coach

Profile
- Position: Head Coach

Personal information
- Born: c. 1889
- Died: September 9, 1941 (aged 52)

Career history
- Newark Tornadoes (1930)
- Coaching profile at Pro Football Reference
- Stats at Pro Football Reference

Albert McGall was a professional football and track and field coach.

McGall coached the Newark Tornadoes of the National Football League in two games during the 1930 NFL season. The Tornadoes, under McGall, lost both games; in official statistics, McGall is credited with a third loss, but by the third game he had already been fired and replaced with Jack Fish.

McGall had more success outside the NFL, coaching the football team of his alma mater, Stevens Tech, from 1915 to 1924 and posting two undefeated seasons. Between 1925 and 1928 he doubled as coach of the Orange Tornadoes football team and as assistant track and field coach at Yale University; at Yale, he coached Olympic pole vault champion and world record holder Sabin Carr, as well as six-time United States champion Fred Sturdy. When the Tornadoes joined the NFL in 1929, McGall was replaced as coach by Jack Depler until his brief return in 1930. After that, he mostly coached track and field; he was track coach at Muhlenberg College when he died of a heart attack on September 9, 1941.
