= Karl Sutter =

German pole vaulter

Medal record

Men's athletics

Representing Germany

European Athletics Championships
Gold medal – first place	1938 Paris	Pole vault

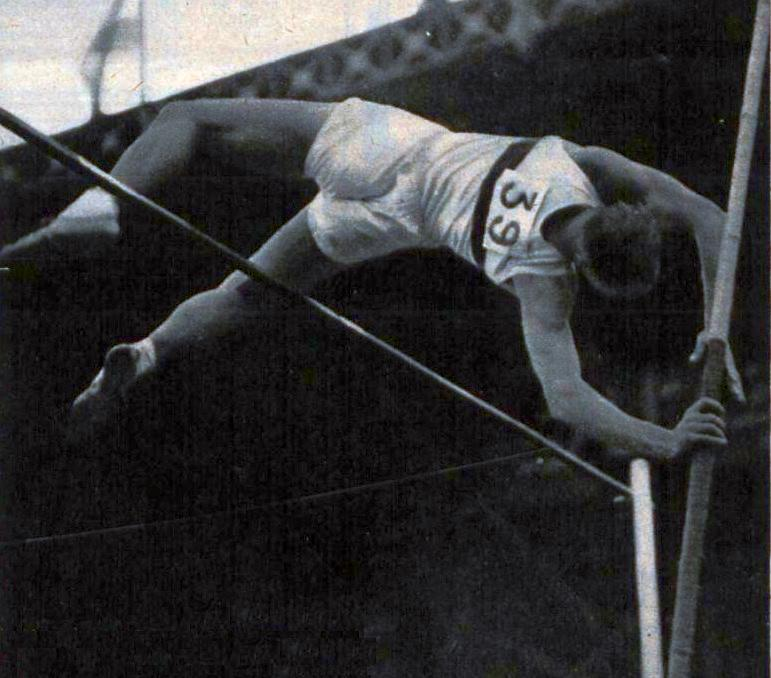
Karl Sutter

Karl Sutter (10 May 1914 – 14 September 2003) was a German track and field athlete who competed in the pole vault.

Born in Basel, Switzerland, he was a member of FC Freiburg sports club and chose to compete internationally for Germany. His first success at national level came in 1937, when he was runner-up at the German Athletics Championships to Julius Müller. He only reached the national podium on one more occasion, in 1939 when he was second to Austria's Josef Haunzwickel (who competed due to the Anschluss).

In spite of his failure to claim a national title in his career, he was the winner at the 1938 European Athletics Championships. Following in the footsteps of his compatriot Gustav Wegner (the 1934 winner), he defeated Bo Ljungberg and won in a championship record mark of 4.05 m (13 ft 3 1/4 in). Given the onset of World War II, he did not compete at any further international athletics competitions and the European gold medal remained the highlight of his short career.

Sutter died in 2003 in Spandau, Berlin.
