= 1938 European Athletics Championships – Men's pole vault =

Men's pole vault at the European Athletics Championships

The men's pole vault at the 1938 European Athletics Championships was held in Paris, France, at Stade Olympique de Colombes on 3 September 1938.

== Medalists ==
Gold	Karl Sutter; Germany
Silver	Bo Ljungberg; Sweden
Bronze	Pierre Ramadier; France

== Results ==
=== Final ===
3 September

Rank	Name	Nationality	Result	Notes
1st place, gold medalist(s)	Karl Sutter	Germany	4.05	CR
2nd place, silver medalist(s)	Bo Ljungberg	Sweden	4.00	
3rd place, bronze medalist(s)	Pierre Ramadier	France	4.00	
4	Wilhelm Schneider	Poland	4.00	
5	Mario Romeo	Italy	4.00	
6	Aulis Reinikka	Finland	3.90	
7	Richard Webster	Great Britain	3.80	
8	Richard Kiipsaar	Estonia	3.70	
9	Ernst Larsen	Denmark	3.70	
10	Svend Aage Thomsen	Denmark	3.70	
11	Robert Vintousky	France	3.50	
12	Carol Eilhardt	Romania	3.50	
	Frans van Peteghem	Belgium	NH	
	Viktor Zsuffka	Hungary	NH	

== Participation ==
According to an unofficial count, 14 athletes from 12 countries participated in the event.

- Belgium (1)
- Denmark (2)
- Estonia (1)
- Finland (1)
- France (2)
- Germany (1)
- Hungary (1)
- Italy (1)
- Poland (1)
- Romania (1)
- Sweden (1)
- Great Britain (1)
