= János Karlovits =

Hungarian pole vaulter

Personal information
- Nationality: Hungarian
- Born: 25 November 1899 Szekszárd, Tolna, Hungary
- Died: 4 November 1986 (aged 86) São Paulo, Brazil

Sport
- Sport: Athletics
- Event: Pole vault
- Club: MAC, Budapest

János Karlovits (25 November 1899 – 4 November 1986) was a Hungarian athlete who competed at the 1928 Summer Olympics.

== Career ==
Karlovits finished second behind Franklin Kelley in the pole jump event (as it was called at the time) at the 1926 AAA Championships. The following year he finished third behind Henry Lindblad at the 1927 AAA Championships.

Karlovits competed in the men's pole vault at the 1928 Olympic Games.
