= Age van der Zee =

Dutch pole vaulter

Personal information
- Nationality: Dutch
- Born: 11 November 1903 Hindeloopen, Netherlands
- Died: 30 October 1982 (aged 78) Haarlem, Netherlands

Sport
- Sport: Athletics
- Event: Pole vault
- Club: AV Haarlem

Achievements and titles
- Personal best: 3.90 m

Age van der Zee (11 November 1903 – 30 October 1982) was a Dutch athlete who competed at the 1928 Summer Olympics.

== Biography ==
Van der Zee competed in the men's pole vault at his home Olympic Games during 1928. placing 14th with a height of 3.30 metres.

Van der Zee finished second behind Howard Ford in the pole jump event at the 1929 AAA Championships and the following year won the event at the 1930 AAA Championships after a tie with Swedish athlete Henry Lindblad.

His personal best pole vault height was 3.90 metres, achieved in 1934.
