= Culi =

Culi may refer to:

== People ==
- Diana Çuli (born 1951), Albanian writer, journalist and politician
- José Culí (1906–1971), Spanish athlete
- Yaakov Culi

== Places ==
- Culi (mountain), Peru
