= John Lindroth =

John Lindroth may refer to:

- John Lindroth (athlete) (1906–1974), Finnish pole vaulter
- John Lindroth (gymnast) (1883–1960), Finnish gymnast
- John Lindroth (photographer) (1962-), US Photographer
