= James Brooker =

American pole vaulter (1902–1973)

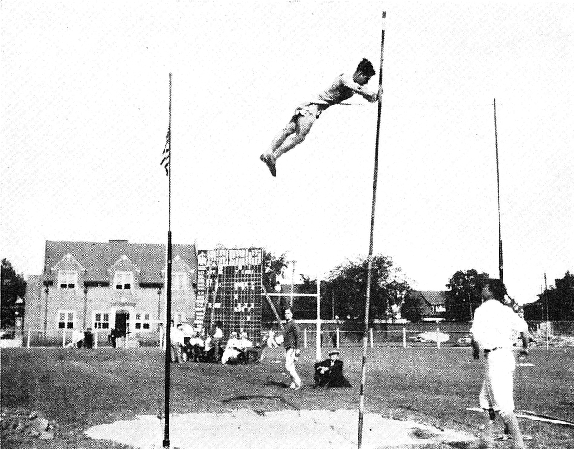
- Brooker in 1924

Medal record

Men's athletics

Representing the United States

Olympic Games
Bronze medal – third place	1924 Paris	Pole vault

James Kent "Jim" Brooker (August 12, 1902 – September 25, 1973) was an American pole vaulter. He competed in 1924 Summer Olympics in Paris and won bronze, behind fellow American pole vaulters Lee Barnes and Glenn Graham, who won gold and silver medals respectively. He was known for his consistency in the pole vault and was considered "a typical acrobat pole vaulter and does more with his hands than any other vaulter in the country."

Brooker was born in Cass City, Michigan, and attended Michigan Agricultural College and later the University of Michigan. He competed in the pole vault for both schools. He was selected as captain of the Michigan track team.
