= John Lindroth (athlete) =

Finnish pole vaulter

Medal record

Men's athletics

Representing Finland

European Championships
Bronze medal – third place	1934 Turin	Pole vault

John Erik "Joppe" Lindroth (11 February 1906 – 12 August 1974) was a Finnish pole vaulter. He came third in men's pole vault at the 1934 European Championships in Turin and was the first Finn to clear four metres.

== Career ==
Lindroth improved the Finnish record several times between 1928 and 1931, raising it from 3.81 m to 4.03 m. He first cleared four metres on 22 September 1929, jumping 4.01 m in Helsinki; he was the first Finn and only the fourth European to clear four metres, after Norway's Charles Hoff, Denmark's Henry Petersen and Sweden's Henry Lindblad. At the 1934 European Championships in Turin he won the bronze medal, clearing 3.90 m on that occasion. He was the first internationally competitive Finnish pole vaulter.
