= Adamczak =

Adamczak is a Polish surname. Notable people with the surname include:

- Monique Adamczak (born 1983), Australian tennis player
- Stefan Adamczak (1892–1939), Polish athlete
