= Gustav Wegner =

German track and field athlete

Medal record

Men's athletics

Representing Germany

European Athletics Championships
Gold medal – first place	1934 Turin	Pole vault

Gustav Wegner (4 January 1903 – 7 June 1942) was a German track and field athlete who competed in the pole vault and the decathlon. He was the first ever European champion in the pole vault and the first German to clear four metres in the event. He was a five-time national champion at the German Athletics Championships and a stadium near Northeim was named in his honour.

== Career ==
Born in Jarocin, Province of Posen, he grew up in a wealthy, educated family and studied up to university level. He graduated in 1927 from the Prussian Academy for Physical Education (German: Preussischen Hochschule für Leibesübungen) and trained in gymnastics, swimming and rowing.

Wegner was the most prominent early pole vaulters in Germany. Competing for VfL Halle 1896, he was a five-time national champion in the discipline at the German Athletics Championships from 1929 to 1934. He was runner-up nationally to Julius Müller in 1928 and 1932. His improvements on the German record were most notable for the fact that he became the nation's first athlete to go over the four-metre barrier. His first national record was 3.855 m (12 ft 7 3/4 in) in June 1929 and bettered this with a vault of 3.995 m (13 ft 1 1/4 in) a month later. This was followed by his historic clearance of 4.055 m (13 ft 3 1/2 in) in 1930 and his final improvement of the record was to 4.12 m (13 ft 6 in) in 1931 in Amsterdam.

Wegner's first and only major medal at an international tournament came at the inaugural 1934 European Athletics Championships, which was held in Turin. Germany's sole entrant in the event, he cleared four metres to defeat Sweden's Bo Ljungberg on count-back and become the first ever European champion in the pole vault. Wegner was succeeded by Karl Sutter, a fellow German, at the next edition in 1938.

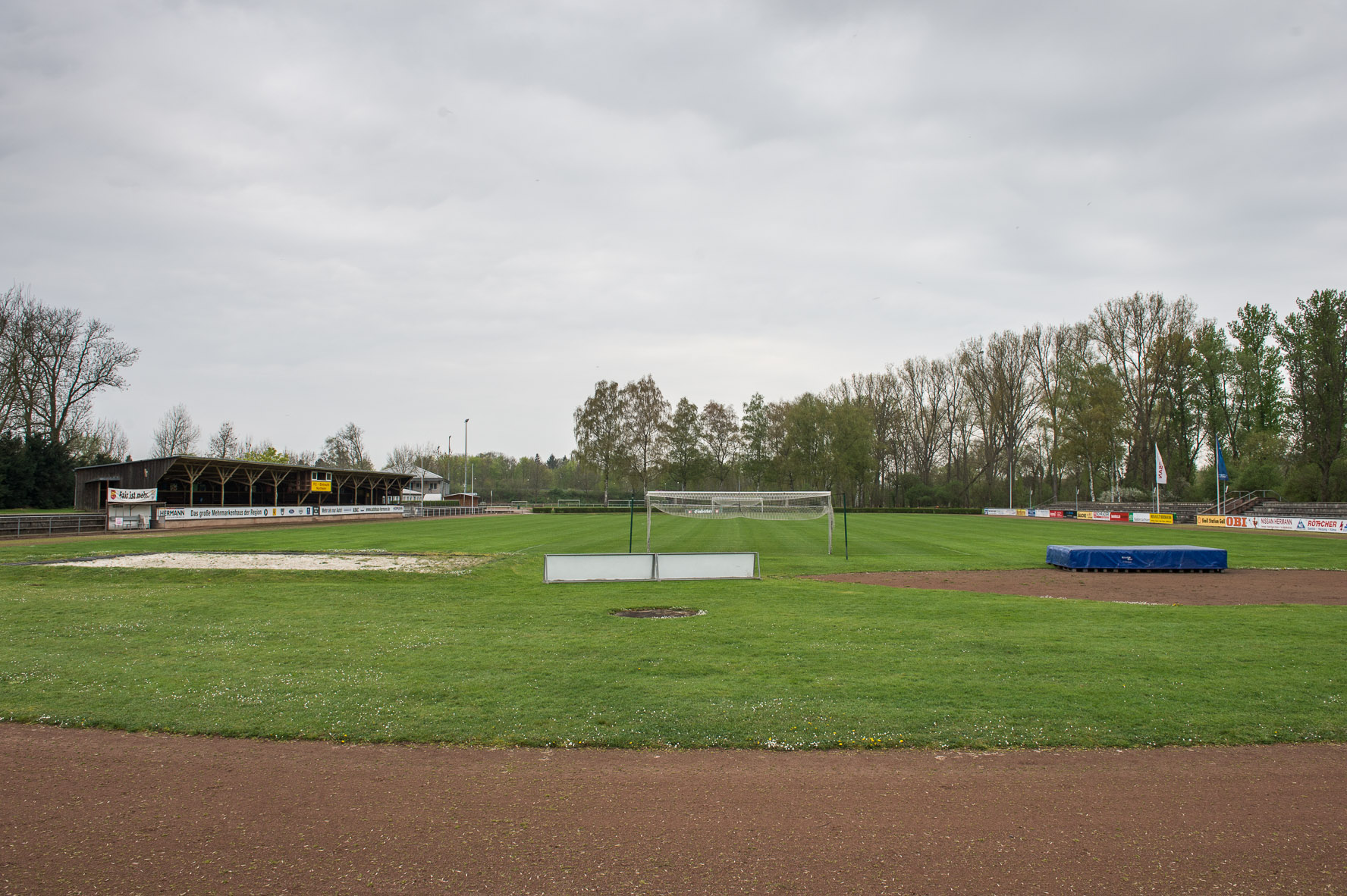
Gustav Wegner Stadium in Northeim in 2014

He competed simultaneously in the pole vault and decathlon and although he never won a championship title in his secondary discipline, he ranked within the top-20 decathletes in the world five times during the period from 1926 to 1932. His personal best score for the decathlon was 7351 points set in Leuna in 1932.

In the mid-1930s he began teaching at Pforta, a prestigious school near Naumburg. Upon the onset of World War II he joined the army and made the rank of lieutenant. He was killed in the course of duty in Taborki on the Eastern Front fighting the Soviets for Nazi Germany. The Gustav Wegner Stadium in the German city of Northeim is named in his honour.

== See also ==
- List of European Athletics Championships medalists (men)
