= 1887 Orange Athletic Club football team =

American college football season

1887 Orange Athletic Club football
- Conference: Independent
- Record: 0–1
- Home stadium: Grove Street grounds

The 1887 Orange Athletic Club football team was an American football team that represented the Orange Athletic Club during the 1887 college football season. The team played its home games at the Grove Street grounds in East Orange, New Jersey, and compiled a 0–1 record in their first season of football.

== Schedule ==
Date	Opponent	Site	Result	Attendance	Source
October 21	Seton Hall	East Orange, New Jersey	L 0–36		
