= Irvine Francis =

Canadian pole vaulter

Personal information
- Nationality: Canadian
- Born: 9 October 1902
- Died: 5 December 1949 (aged 47)

Sport
- Sport: Athletics
- Event: Pole vault

Irvine Edward Francis (9 October 1902 – 5 December 1949) was a Canadian athlete. He competed in the men's pole vault at the 1924 Summer Olympics.
