= Marcel Muzard =

French pole vaulter

Personal information
- Nationality: French
- Born: 20 February 1894
- Died: 8 July 1966 (aged 72)

Sport
- Sport: Athletics
- Event: Pole vault

Marcel Muzard (20 February 1894 – 8 July 1966) was a French athlete. He competed in the men's pole vault at the 1924 Summer Olympics.
