= Yrjö Helander =

Finnish pole vaulter

Personal information
- Full name: Yrjö Anselm Helander
- Nationality: Finnish
- Born: 23 April 1896 Hämeenlinna, Russian Empire
- Died: 28 August 1969 (aged 73) Hämeenlinna, Finland

Sport
- Sport: Athletics
- Event: Pole vault

Yrjö Helander (23 April 1896 – 28 August 1969) was a Finnish athlete. He competed in the men's pole vault at the 1924 Summer Olympics.
