= Andy Salata =

American gridiron football player (1900–1983)

Profile
- Position: Guard

Personal information
- Born: July 11, 1900; Kingston, Pennsylvania, U.S.
- Died: July 1983 (aged 82–83)

Career information
- College: Pittsburgh

Career history
- 1929: Orange Tornadoes
- 1930: Newark Tornadoes
- Coaching profile at Pro Football Reference

Andrew J. Salata (July 11, 1900 – July 1983) was a professional football player-coach with the Orange Tornadoes and later the Newark Tornadoes, of the National Football League. In 1930, the Tornadoes moved to Newark from Orange, New Jersey. The team then hired Salata and Jack Fish to serve as co-coaches. Neither man had ever coached in the NFL before. Under the two coaches the Tornadoes were 1–11, to finish last in the league.
