= Victor Pickard =

Canadian pole vaulter

Vic Pickard
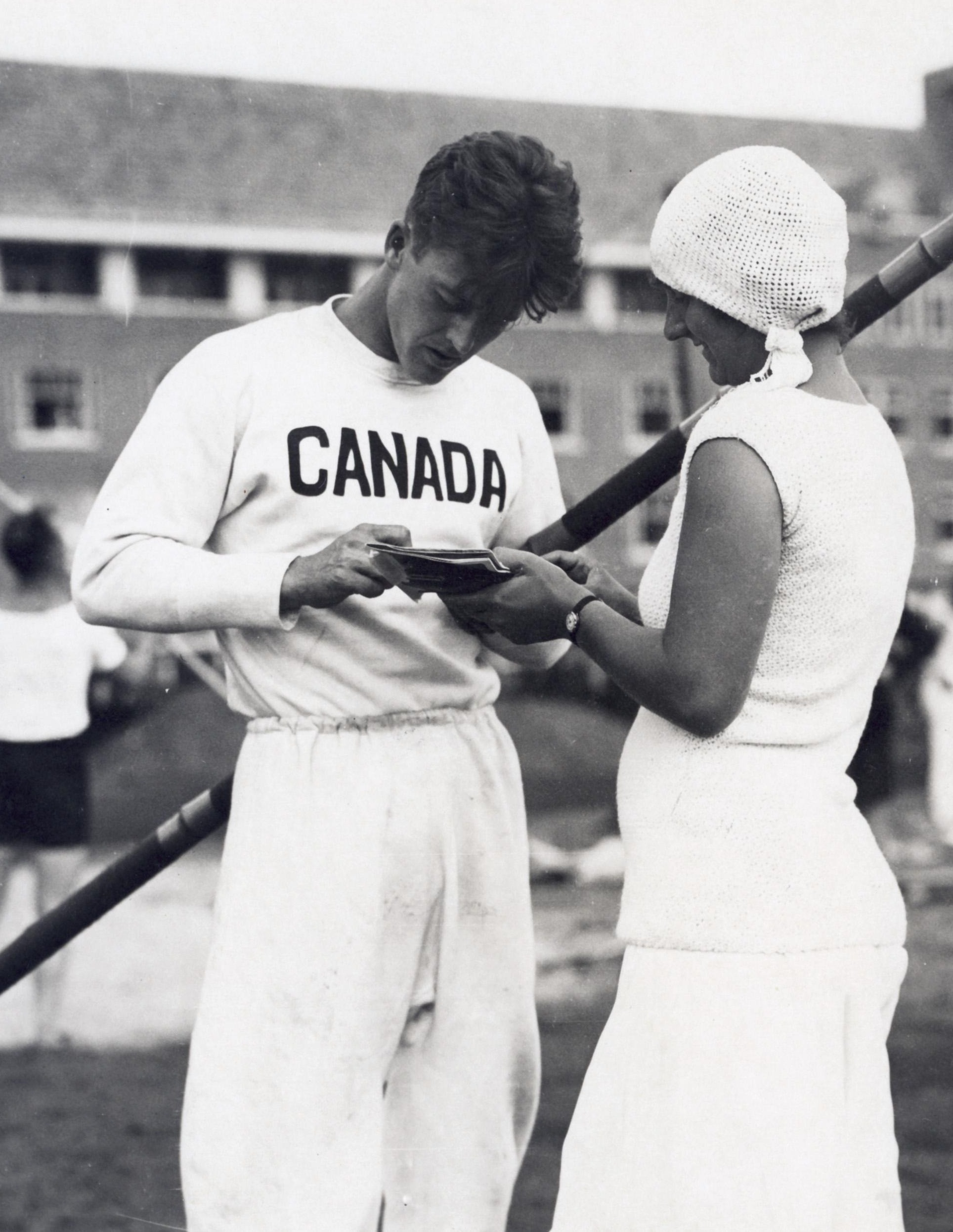
- Victor Pickard at the 1928 Olympics

Personal information
- Full name: Victor Willoughby Pickard
- Born: October 23, 1903 Hamilton, Ontario, Canada
- Died: January 11, 2001 (aged 97) Miami, Florida, United States
- Height: 1.79 m (5 ft 10 in)

Sport
- Sport: Athletics

Achievements and titles
- Olympic finals: 1924, 1928
Medal record
Representing Canada
British Empire Games
Gold medal – first place	1930 Hamilton	Pole vault

Victor Willoughby Pickard (October 23, 1903 – January 11, 2001) was a Canadian track and field athlete who competed in the 1924 Summer Olympics and in the 1928 Summer Olympics. In 1924 he finished fifth the pole vault event and 28th in the javelin throw competition. Four years later he finished fourth in the pole vault contest. Pickard won the pole vault event at the 1930 British Empire Games.

Pickard was an All-American for the Pittsburgh Panthers track and field team in the pole vault, finishing 3rd at the 1928 NCAA Track and Field Championships.
