= Eevald Äärma =

Estonian pole vaulter

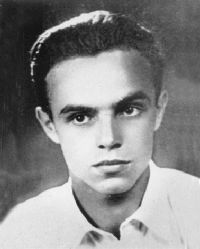

Personal information
- Born: Evald Ärman; 28 December 1911 Tartu, Governorate of Livonia, Russian Empire
- Died: 13 October 2005 (aged 93) Baltimore, U.S.
- Height: 174 cm (5 ft 9 in)
- Weight: 70 kg (154 lb)

Sport
- Sport: Athletics
- Event: Pole vault
- Club: EASK Tartu

Achievements and titles
- Personal best: 4.02 (1938)

Eevald Äärma (until 1936 Ärman; 28 December 1911 – 13 October 2005) was an Estonian pole vaulter. He competed at the 1934 European Championships and 1936 Summer Olympics and placed 7th and 26th, respectively.

== Early life and education ==
Äärma was born in Tartu, in the Governorate of Livonia of the Russian Empire (now Estonia), the son of Aleksander Äärman (1875–1957) and Helene Marie Äärman (née Nerska; 1885–1978). He graduated from Tartu High School. He studied veterinary medicine at the University of Tartu (1937–1939) and then at the University of Helsinki.

== Athletics and later life ==
Äärma took up pole vaulting in 1927 and won the Estonian title in 1936 and 1937. He also played ice hockey with the University of Tartu Academic Sports Club. He then worked as a veterinarian in Avinurme, where he married Nelli Kirre (1918–2002) in 1940. In 1944, when the Soviet Army invaded Estonia, he and his family fled to Sweden. He emigrated to the United States in 1954, initially to North Dakota, then to Aplington, Iowa, and finally to Baltimore in 1968, where he worked as a veterinarian. He continued to practice sports, and he won gold medals in javelin and shot put at the 1989 Senior Olympics. Eevald Äärma died in Baltimore in 2005.
