= Felix McCormick =

American football player (1905–1971)

Profile
- Positions: Fullback, Guard, Halfback

Personal information
- Born: May 21, 1905; Newark, New Jersey
- Died: March 30, 1971 (aged 65)
- Listed height: 5 ft 7 in (1.70 m)
- Listed weight: 185 lb (84 kg)

Career information
- College: Bucknell University

Career history
- Orange Tornadoes (1929); Newark Tornadoes (1930)
- Stats at Pro Football Reference

Felix John McCormick (May 21, 1905 – March 30, 1971) was a professional football player with the Orange Tornadoes of the National Football League. McCormick played college football at Bucknell University prior to playing professionally. On December 1, 1929, McCormick completed a 35-yard field goal to give the Orange Tornadoes the win over the Staten Island Stapletons, 3–0. In 1926, he completed a 53-yard drop kick with Bucknell University.

== Later life ==
McCormick taught in the Bloomfield school system from 1941 to 1948. He later became a professor of business administration at Columbia University.
