= František Fuhrherr-Nový =

Czech pole vaulter

Personal information
- Nationality: Czech
- Born: 31 October 1903 Bystřice pod Hostýnem, Austria-Hungary
- Died: 22 January 1985 (aged 81) Šternberk, Czechoslovakia

Sport
- Sport: Athletics
- Event: Pole vault

František Fuhrherr-Nový (31 October 1903 – 22 January 1985) was a Czech athlete. He competed in the men's pole vault at the 1924 Summer Olympics.
