= Mario Romeo =

Italian pole vaulter

Personal information
- National team: Italy: 15 caps (1933-1950)
- Born: 7 April 1915 Carloforte, Italy
- Died: 1992 (aged 76–77)

Sport
- Sport: Athletics
- Event: Pole vault
- Club: GS Baracca Milano (1938-1946); U.S. Milanese (1947-1950)

Achievements and titles
- Personal best: Pole vault: 4.17 m (1942)

Mario Romeo (7 April 1915 – 1992) was an Italian pole vaulter who was 5th at the 1938 European Athletics Championships.

== Biography ==
Romeo won six national championships at individual senior level.

Romeo won the British AAA Championships title in the pole vault event at the 1938 AAA Championships.

Shortly afterwards in September, he competed at the 1938 European Athletics Championships.

== National records ==
Romeo has set several national records, the last of which held for nine years.

- Pole vault: 4.17 m ( (Switzerland) Zürich, 23 August 1942) – record holder until 23 September 1951.

== Achievements ==
Year	Competition	Venue	Rank	Event	Measure	Notes
1938	European Championships	(France) Paris	5th	Pole vault	4.00 m	

== National titles ==
- Italian Athletics Championships
  - Pole vault: 1938, 1939, 1943, 1945, 1947, 1950 (6)

== See also ==
- Italy at the 1938 European Athletics Championships
