= Edwin Simandl =

American sports executive

Edwin (Piggy) Simandl was the owner of the Orange Tornadoes and Newark Tornadoes of the National Football League. He became the team's owner in 1929, when Ole Haugsrud, the owner of Duluth Eskimos, sold his defunct franchise rights to Simandl. This allowed Simandl to place his Orange Tornadoes in the NFL. In addition to running his NFL franchise, Simandl was a wholesale meat salesman, which was why he was given the nickname "Piggy". In 1930, the team moved to Newark and played a dismal season that resulted in just 1 win. Afterward, Simandl sold his franchise rights back to the NFL. However, after a 2-year hiatus, he reorganized his team in Orange. The Tornadoes then defeated the Staten Island Stapletons 7-0 in their first game back.

== Ernest Cuneo ==
However, according to one of his former players, Ernest Cuneo, Simandl also resembled a pig. Cuneo wrote: "He was also short and fat, with puffy, red-veined jowls, a low forehead and close-set eyes. People in his hometown of Orange, New Jersey, would have given him the same monicker if he'd sold shoes." According to Cuneo, "He was usually officious and always bursting with his own importance, but he was flamboyantly agreeable, and everyone, including the team, liked him." However, it was also reported that the team's payroll was usually late due to the lack of money in the team treasury, which was blamed on poor attendance.

== Rivalry with Staten Island ==
Prior to Orange becoming a member of the NFL, the team enjoyed a rivalry with another future NFL franchise, the Staten Island Stapletons. In 1927, Simandl canceled a game against the Stapletons in a dispute over the distribution of gate receipts. A few weeks later before the final Stapletons game of the season that was to be played in Staten Island, Simandl demanded that the Stapes game be played in Orange, New Jersey. To avoid losing the game, Stapletons manager Dan Blaine agreed to play in Orange.

== American Association ==
In June 1936, the American Association was formed in response to a proposal by Simandl for the need of a minor league system for pro football. Simandl's Tornadoes were a charter member of the league. He moved the team back to Newark in 1938, then sold his team to George Halas in 1939.
