= Paul Longua =

American football player (1903–1983)

Profile
- Position: End

Personal information
- Born: April 17, 1903; Brooklyn, New York
- Died: June 13, 1983 (aged 80)
- Listed height: 5 ft 10 in (1.78 m)
- Listed weight: 175 lb (79 kg)

Career information
- College: Villanova University

Career history
- Millville Big Blue (1925); Staten Island Stapletons (1926–1927); Orange Tornadoes (1928–1929); Newark Tornadoes (1930)
- Stats at Pro Football Reference

Paul J. Longua (April 17, 1903 – June 13, 1983) was a professional football player with the Orange Tornadoes and Newark Tornadoes of the National Football League. He also played pro football for the independent Millville Big Blue in 1925. He would finish the 1925 season with 3 touchdowns. Afterwards he played with the Staten Island Stapletons prior to the team joining the NFL. On October 6, 1929, Longua ran 60 yards for a touchdown to give the Orange Tornadoes a 7–0 victory over the Boston Bulldogs.

Longua played college football at Villanova University prior to playing professionally. While at Villanova, Longua completed the longest punt in school history on November 25, 1922, against Duquesne University. The punt was record as going 95 yards.
