= Paul Dufauret =

French pole vaulter

Personal information
- Nationality: French
- Born: 17 August 1900
- Died: 13 March 1973 (aged 72)

Sport
- Sport: Athletics
- Event: Pole vault

Paul Dufauret (17 August 1900 – 13 March 1973) was a French athlete. He competed in the men's pole vault at the 1924 Summer Olympics.

== Performance ==
Dufauret tied for 8th place in the Pole Vault event during the 1924 Summer Olympics.
