= Aksel Nikolajsen =

Danish pole vaulter

Personal information
- Nationality: Danish
- Born: 9 February 1901
- Died: 18 March 1993 (aged 92)

Sport
- Sport: Athletics
- Event: Pole vault

Aksel Nikolajsen (9 February 1901 – 18 March 1993) was a Danish athlete. He competed in the men's pole vault at the 1928 Summer Olympics.
