= Ministry of Labour and Sports =

Former government ministry of Norway

The Norwegian Ministry of Labour and Sports (Norwegian: Arbeidstjeneste- og idrettsdepartementet) was a government ministry during the German occupation of Norway.

The ministry was set up on 25 September 1940 by Reichskommissar Josef Terboven as a consequence of the occupation of Norway by Nazi Germany during World War II. The ministry was headed by Axel Heiberg Stang throughout the occupation. It was closed the same day as the occupation ended, on 8 May 1945.
