= Orange/Newark Tornadoes =

American football franchise

Orange-Newark Tornadoes
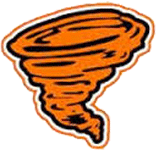
Logo

General information
- Founded: 1887
- Folded: 1970
- Stadium: Grove Street Grounds (1889), East Orange Oval (1890–???); East Orange Stadium (???–1925); Knights of Columbus Stadium (1926–1929, 1931–1936); Newark Schools Stadium (1930, 1937–65); Newark Velodrome (1930); Tangerine Bowl (1966–1969)
- Headquartered: Orange, New Jersey; Newark, New Jersey; Orlando, Florida (1966–1969)
- Colors: Navy, orange, white

Personnel
- Owners: Edwin Simandl (1929–1938); George Halas (1939–1941); Sol Rosen (1963–1964); Tom Granatell (1966–1969); Paul Massey (1970)
- Head coach: Jack Depler (1929); Jack Fish, Al McGall, Andy Salata (1930)

Team history
- Orange Athletic Club (1887–1928); Orange Tornadoes (1929, 1931–1936); Newark Tornadoes (1930, 1937–1938); Newark Bears (1939–1941, 1963–1965); Orlando Panthers (1966–1969)

League / conference affiliations
- Independent (1887, 1904–1928, 1931–1935); American Football Union (AFU) (1888–1895); National Football League (1929–1930); American Association (1936–1948); Atlantic Coast Football League (1963–1964, 1970–1971); Continental Football League (1965–1969)

The Orange Tornadoes and Newark Tornadoes were two manifestations of a long-lived professional American football franchise that existed in some form from 1887 to 1941 and from 1958 to 1970, having played in the American Amateur Football Union from 1888 to 1895, the National Football League from 1929 to 1930, the American Association from 1936 to 1941, the Atlantic Coast Football League from 1963 to 1964 and 1970, and the Continental Football League from 1965 to 1969. The team was based for most of its history in Orange, New Jersey, with many of its later years in Newark. Its last five seasons of existence were as the Orlando Panthers, when the team was based in Orlando, Florida. The NFL franchise was sold back to the league in October 1930. The team had four head coaches in its two years in the NFL – Jack Depler in Orange, and Jack Fish, Al McGall and Andy Salata in Newark.

== History ==
=== Early years ===
The Orange Tornadoes can trace their roots back to the Orange Athletic Club. The Orange A.C. was originally an amateur football team that began play in 1887. The team's first ever game was a 36–0 loss to the Seton Hall University football team. By the 1890s the Orange became a semi-pro team. In 1892, the team practiced under electric lights at night to prepare for an October 8 game against Rutgers College. The Orange A. C. would go on to win that game 22–10. In 1893, the team won the American Football Union Championship, after posting an 8–2 record. In 1902, the Orange A. C. played against Philadelphia Phillies and the Philadelphia Athletics of the first National Football League. The team also played in World Series of Football in that year, at Madison Square Garden. In 1902, Orange lost to All-Syracuse, 36–0. However, the team returned to the World Series of Football in 1903, when they played the Watertown Red & Black and the eventual champion, the Franklin Athletic Club. Orange lost to Watertown, 11–0, and to Franklin, 12–0. However, it did manage to defeat the Oreo Athletic Club of Asbury Park, 22–0.

=== Pre-NFL ===
The Orange team became an established independent pro team from 1919 until 1928, under the nickname the Orange AC Golden Tornadoes. During this time, Orange defeated the New York Brickley Giants of the NFL. They also played pre-NFL versions of the Frankford Yellow Jackets and the Staten Island Stapletons. They also played against the Atlantic City Roses and the Millville Big Blue, two of the top independent teams of the 1920s. By 1928, Orange held the New York Giants and Frankford Yellow Jackets to close scores. On September 16, 1928, Orange held the 1927 NFL Champion New York Giants to just a 7–0 victory. A week earlier the NFL's previous champions, the Frankford Yellow Jackets, were held to a 12–0 victory. Orange showed that their team could compete in the NFL.

While the Golden Tornadoes played in Orange, a separate Newark Bears played in the original American Football League in the 1926 season in Newark, unrelated to the Tornadoes team that would later take on that identity. That Newark Bears club was later absorbed into the Staten Island Stapletons.

== 1929 season ==
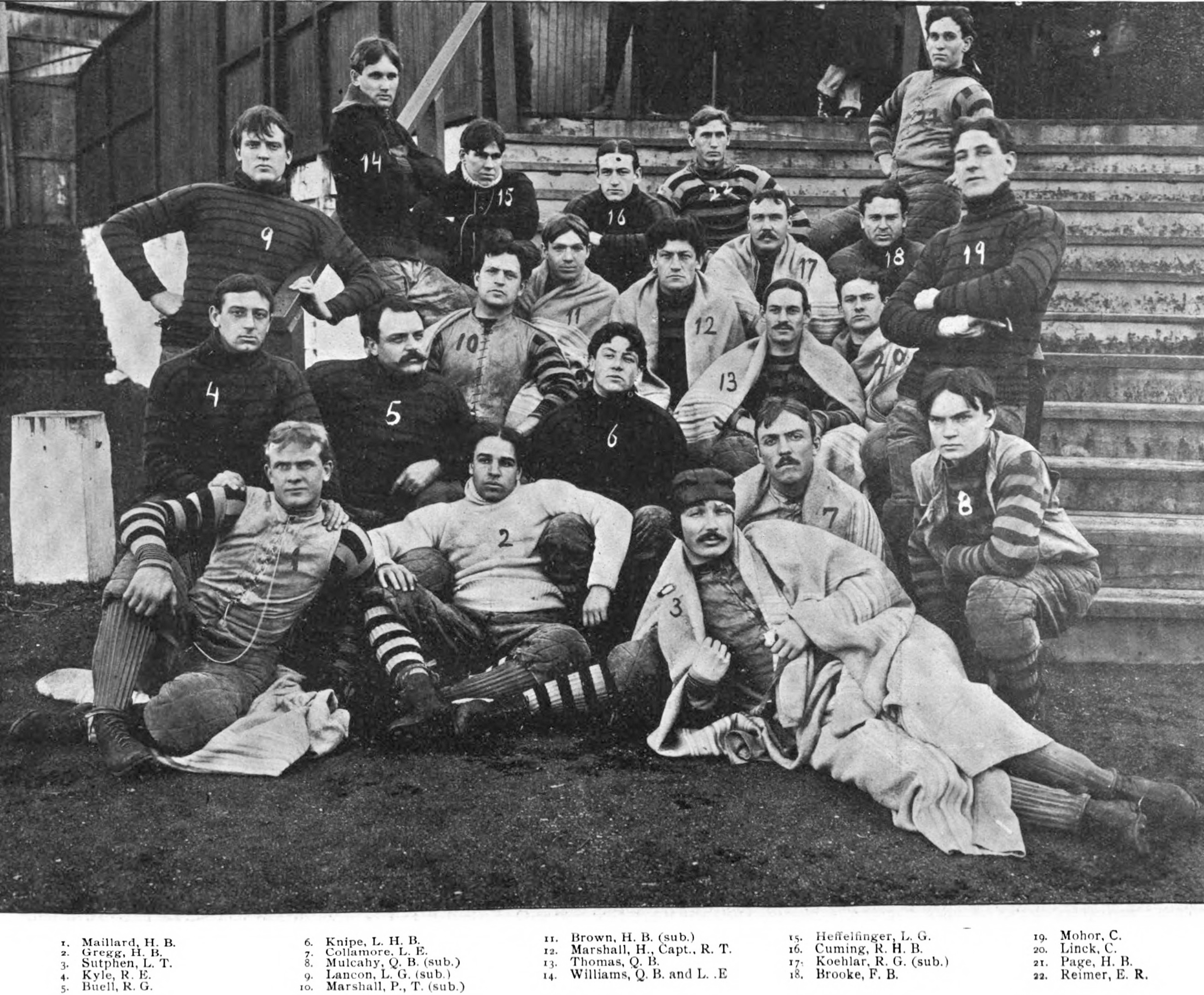
Orange Athletic Club in 1896. This team evolved into the Orange Tornadoes of the NFL.

In 1929 Ole Haugsrud, the owner of Duluth Eskimos, sold his NFL franchise rights for the Eskimos to Piggy Simandl, a wholesale meat salesman and sports promoter from Orange, who named his franchise the Orange Tornadoes. The Tornadoes played their home games at Knights of Columbus Stadium. The first game for the new team was a scoreless tie against the New York Giants on September 29, 1929. A week later the team recorded its first NFL win by defeating the Boston Bulldogs 7–0. The victory came off a short George Pease pass to Paul Longua, who ran 60 yards for a touchdown. However, the following week, Orange experienced its first NFL loss in a 7–0 defeat to the 1928 NFL Champions, the Providence Steamroller. The team regrouped on October 19, 1929, and the Tornadoes held the Frankford Yellow Jackets to a 6–6 tie at Frankford Stadium. A week later the team rallied from a 13–0 deficit to defeat the Boston Bulldogs, 19–13.

On October 29, 1929, the Bulldogs and Tornadoes met again to play, in Pottsville, Pennsylvania. Prior to 1929, the Bulldogs played as the Pottsville Maroons and the teams played for their still loyal fans at the Maroons' Minersville Park. This time however, the Tornadoes lost 6–0 by way of a 4-yard touchdown run from Boston's Tony Latone. On October 3, the Tornadoes held the Staten Island Stapletons to a scoreless tie at Thompson Stadium. During that game the Stapletons were within scoring distance three times, but to no avail. Meanwhile, the Tornadoes only penetrated the Staten Island 20-yard line once.

The Orange then lost a rematch against the New York Giants, 22–0, a week later. But after a scoreless tie against Frankford, the Orange defeated the Staten Island Stapletons 3–0, due to a Felix McCormick field goal. However, the next game, against the Chicago Cardinals, resulted in a 26–0 Tornadoes loss. The Cardinals, led by Ernie Nevers, put up 20 points in the second quarter of the game. The Tornadoes then ended their 1929 season with a 10–0 loss to Frankford. They finished with a 3–5–4 record, scoring 35 points, while giving up 80.

== 1930 ==
1930 Newark Tornadoes logo

The team's fortune in the NFL changed for the worse after it moved to Newark in 1930. During the team's time in Newark, it played its home games at Newark Schools Stadium. Head coach Jack Depler defected to buy the Dayton Triangles, moving that team to Brooklyn and transforming that team into the Brooklyn Dodgers. He took most of the members of the 1929 Tornadoes with him. Meanwhile, the Tornadoes went through three coaches during the 1930 season, and the team's only victory during the 1930 season was against the Frankford Yellow Jackets.

The last game for the Newark Tornadoes was against the New York Giants, a 34–7 loss on October 29, 1930. The franchise ended league play after the 1930 season and was sold back to the NFL. The league ordered the franchise sold to the highest bidder prior to the 1931 season, but there were no takers, and a league-owned Cleveland Indians assumed the Tornadoes' place in the NFL for that season.

In 1932, a Boston-based group headed by George Preston Marshall won a new NFL franchise. The new team would be named the Boston Braves, now the Washington Commanders. Strong circumstantial evidence indicates that Marshall's group was awarded the remains of the failed Newark organization. The NFL's decision to auction off the Tornadoes to the highest bidder indicated its intent to replace the franchise, and Marshall's group was the next to receive a franchise (though the league had temporarily added a league-owned franchise, the Cleveland Indians, to fill the Tornadoes' position in 1931). Additionally, Eskimos owner Haugsrud recalled in 1974 letter to George Halas that the Eskimos franchise was transferred to New Jersey before being transferred to Boston. However, the NFL considers the Commanders to be a 1932 expansion team and not a continuation of the Tornadoes, just as it does not consider the Tornadoes to be a continuation of the Eskimos. Likewise, the Commanders do not claim the Tornadoes or Eskimos (nor the Indians) as part of their own legacy.

== Tornadoes and Bears in the American Association ==
Though the NFL franchise had moved to Newark, owner Edwin Simandl had kept a barebones organization back in Orange, just in case the NFL Tornadoes failed. When they did, he moved as many players as he could from the Newark squad back to Orange. The minor league Tornadoes played in various leagues, including the American Association, of which it was a charter member. The Orange Tornadoes moved back to Newark in 1937 and were eventually bought by the Chicago Bears. Playing under the name Newark Bears (a name previously used by the Newark Bears of the 1926 American Football League), the team played in the AA through 1941.

The team did not return after World War II; instead, George Halas took what was left of the team and split it into the Newark Bombers and the Akron Bears. The Bloomfield Cardinals replaced both teams in 1947. The NFL severed ties with all minor league teams in 1948.

== Uniforms ==
In 1929, Orange experimented with using letters instead of numbers on player jerseys; Heinie Benkert, for example, wore the letter "C" on his uniform.

== Season-by-season ==
Name	League	Year	W	L	T	Finish	Coach
Orange Tornadoes	NFL	1929	3	5	4	6th	Jack Depler
Newark Tornadoes	NFL	1930	1	10	1	11th	Jack Fish, Al McGall, Andy Salata
Orange Tornadoes	AA	1936	4	4	0	5th	
Newark Tornadoes	AA	1937	6	1	3	T-1st	
Newark Tornadoes	AA	1938	2	5	0	6th	
Newark Bears	AA	1939	6	2	1	Champions	
Newark Bears	AA	1940	5	5	1	T-4th	
Newark Bears	AA	1941	3	6	0	5th	

- A complete game-by-game record to 1937 can be found here.

== Sources ==
- Pro-Football Reference
- HickokSports.com
- 1929 NFL season
- Orange Athletic Club of New Jersey: Complete Football Records
- In the Same League
- Uniform Numbers of the NFL
- Discussion of Newark and Orlando in the Continental Football League from the Professional Football Researchers Association
