= Maurice Vautier =

French pole vaulter

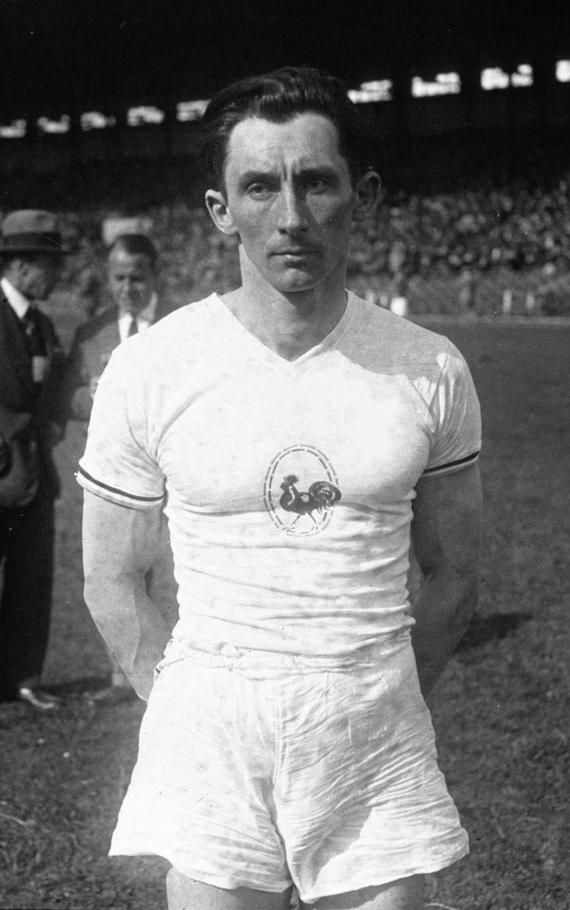
- Vautier in 1928

Personal information
- Born: 23 May 1901 Elbeuf, France
- Died: 15 October 1979 (aged 78)
- Height: 172 cm (5 ft 8 in)
- Weight: 68 kg (150 lb)

Sport
- Sport: Athletics
- Event: Pole vault
- Club: Touristes Elbeuf

Achievements and titles
- Personal best: PV – 3.81 m (1926)

Maurice Vautier (23 May 1901 – 15 October 1979) was a French pole vaulter. He competed at the 1924 Summer Olympics and finished eighth.
