= Robert Duthil =

French pole vaulter

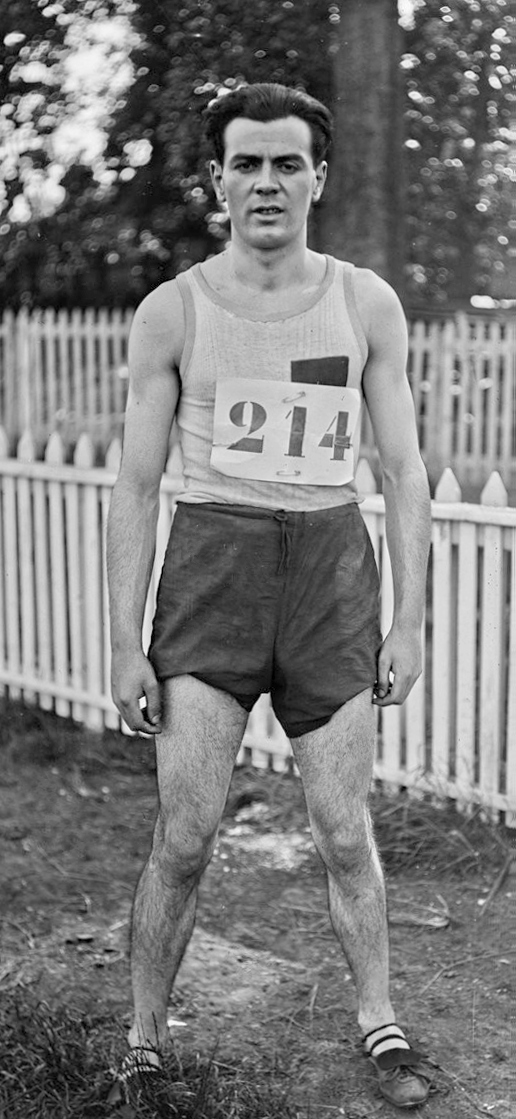
- Duthil in 1922

Personal information
- Born: 24 November 1899 Bordeaux, France
- Died: 19 December 1967 (aged 68) Montpellier, France

Sport
- Sport: Athletics
- Event: Pole vault
- Club: Stade Bordelais, Bordeaux

Achievements and titles
- Personal best: 3.66 m (1927)

Robert Duthil (24 November 1899 – 19 December 1967) was a French pole vaulter. He competed at the 1924 Summer Olympics and finished 11th.
