= William Droegemueller =

American pole vaulter (1906–1987)

- Droegemueller around age 21, in Northwestern track jersey, circa 1927–1928

Personal information
- Nickname: "Droegie"
- Born: William Herbert Droegemueller; October 7, 1906 Chicago, Illinois, U.S.
- Died: February 23, 1987 (aged 80) Sun City, Arizona, U.S.
- Education: Northwestern University (1928); Northwestern Medical School (1932)
- Occupation: Ophthalmologist
- Height: 1.78 m (5 ft 10 in)
- Weight: 64 kg (141 lb)
- Spouse: Florence Scribner (1928)
- Children: 3 sons

Sport
- Sport: Athletics
- Event: Pole vault
- College team: Northwestern University
- Coached by: Frank Hill (Northwestern); Lawson Robertson (1928 Olympics)

Achievements and titles
- Personal bests: 4.19 m (pole vault, 1928)
Medal record
Representing the United States
Olympic Games
| Silver medal – second place | 1928 Amsterdam | Pole vault |

William Herbert Droegemueller (October 7, 1906 – February 23, 1987) was an American track and field athlete who excelled in the pole vault, and competed in track, football, and basketball for Northwestern University. He won a silver medal at the 1928 Amsterdam Olympics in the pole vault, setting an Olympic record of 4.1 meters. After Droegemueller graduated Northwestern University Medical School in 1932, he served as a physician in World War II, then established a practice in ophthalmology of around 25 years beginning around 1947 in greater Chicago, and briefly in Greeley, Colorado. He retired to Sun City, Arizona around 1972.

== Early life ==
Droegmueller was born October 7, 1906 in Chicago to mother Marie, and father Herman L. Droegemueller. William grew up in Colorado Springs, Colorado, and after a family move, attended a military high school in Chicago. In high school, he completed a vault of just over 11 feet.

== Northwestern University ==
Droegmueller attended Northwestern University from around 1924 to 1928, where he competed in track, football, tennis, and basketball. A standout in the pole vault, he was coached by Northwestern's head track and field coach Frank Hill, a member of the Helms Track and Field Hall of Fame, who coached at Northwestern from 1921 to 1952. Droegemueller was particularly accomplished during the 1926 indoor track season. He broke the school record for pole vault at a Northwestern meet held in Patten Gym, clearing 13 feet, a foot higher than the former collegiate record. He captured a third place finish in the pole vault in the 1926 Big 10 collegiate conference outdoor championship, establishing a new world and conference record, and set a 1928 world indoor record of 13 feet, 2 1/2 inches. He improved on that record at the 1928 quadrangular meets with a vault of 13 feet, 6 1/2 inches. Droegemueller was an NCAA pole vault champion in 1927 and placed second in 1928. At Northwestern, he belonged to the Deru honorary society, Sigma Xi. An accomplished student, he was a member of Phi Beta Kappa academic honorary society. In 1928, he received the Big Ten Conference medal, an award presented to only one collegiate senior per conference school, with the highest level of athletic and academic achievement.

== 1928 Olympics ==
At the 1928 Olympic tryouts, Droegemueller vaulted a distance of 13 feet, 9 3/4 inches, or around 4.21 meters though the distance may have been unofficial. At the time, vaulters still used bamboo poles which were stiffer than today's fiberglass poles.

Droegemueller competed for the United States at the pole vault at the 1928 Summer Olympics held in Amsterdam, where he won the silver medal with a vault of 13 feet, 5 7/16 inches or around 4.1 meters, an Olympic record. In 1928, the U.S. Olympic track and field head coach was Lawson Robertson of the University of Pennsylvania. The American team took the medals with Sabin Carr taking the gold, clearing a vault of 4.2 meters, Droegemueller taking the silver, clearing around 4.1 meters, and Charles McGinnis taking the bronze. Only Sabin Carr and Droegemueller were able to clear 4.1 meters, the new Olympic record. Frank Foss had set a former world record of 4.09 meters at the 1920 Antwerp Olympics.

== Marriage ==
Droegemueller married Florence Scribner Droegemueller on December 22, 1928, at Northwestern's Alpha Phi House in Evanston, Illinois. Scribner attended Northwestern, majoring in education and graduated with the class of 1928, as had William. The couple had three sons. Both Droegemuellers were supporters of Northwestern, with William serving as a director of the Northwestern Chicago Club from 1934 to 1939, and as a 1947 director of the board for the Northwestern University Association.

== Medical career ==
In 1932, Droegemueller completed a degree from Northwestern University Medical School—now known as the Feinberg School of Medicine in Chicago. He served as a physician in World War II, before returning home and establishing his own practice in ophthalmology in greater Chicago around 1947. Staying active at Northwestern, he was the 1937 vice president of the Medical Faculty Alumni Association, before serving in WWII.

While living in Greeley, Colorado in 1972, and practicing ophthalmology, Droegemueller served as a co-chair of Weld County Colorado's Olympic Fund to help send athletes to the 1972 Munich Olympics. After living in Greeley a few years, he retired to Arizona by October 1972, where he may have continued a small practice, though the Greeley Daily tribune wrote that he retired around 1972.

His son, Dr. William Droegemueller, was a well-known obstetrician-gynecologist who served on the faculty of the University of North Carolina at Chapel Hill and had formerly taught at the University of Colorado School of Medicine in Aurora, Colorado, where he graduated medical school in 1960.

Droegemueller died at the age of 80, on February 23, 1987, in Sun City, Arizona. He was buried in Linn Grove Cemetery in Greeley, Colorado where he had lived in the 1970s. He was survived by his wife Florence, who died in December, 1906, and around three sons.
