= Bo Ljungberg =

Swedish athletics competitor (1911–1984)

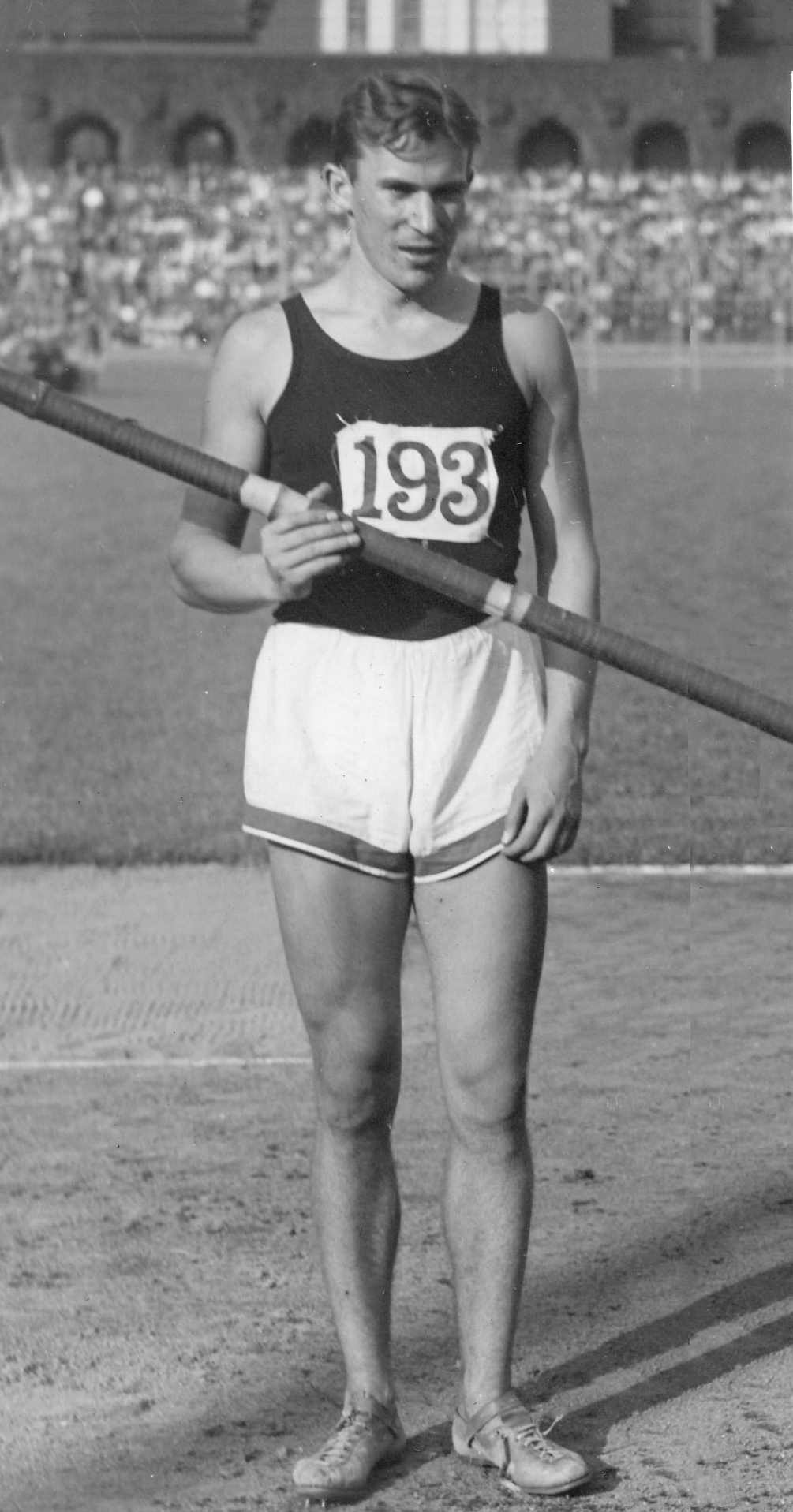

Personal information
- Born: 21 November 1911 Stoby, Sweden
- Died: 19 March 1984 (aged 72) Jönköping, Sweden
- Height: 1.83 m (6 ft 0 in)
- Weight: 77 kg (170 lb)

Sport
- Sport: Athletics
- Events: Pole vault, triple jump
- Club: Malmö AI

Achievements and titles
- Personal bests: PV – 4.15 m (1935); TJ – 14.73 m (1934)
Medal record
Men's athletics
Representing Sweden
European Championships
Silver medal – second place	1934 Turin	Pole vault
Silver medal – second place	1938 Paris	Pole vault
International University Games
Gold medal – first place	1933 Turin	Pole vault
Bronze medal – third place	1939 Vienna	Pole vault

Bo Alexander Ljungberg (21 November 1911 – 19 March 1984) was a Swedish athlete. He won two silver medals in the pole vault at the European Championships and competed in the 1936 Summer Olympics as both a pole vaulter and a triple jumper.

== Career ==
Bo Ljungberg won gold in the pole vault at the 1933 International University Games in Turin, clearing 3.90 m. At the following year's European Championships, also in Turin, he jumped 4.00 m and won silver behind Germany's Gustav Wegner; he also competed in the triple jump, placing 8th with 14.01 m.

He also took part in both events at the 1936 Summer Olympics in Berlin; in the triple jump he managed 14.35 m and placed eighteenth, while in the pole vault he again cleared 4.00 m and shared sixth place with ten others. At the 1938 European Championships he repeated his silver medal from four years before, clearing 4.00 m once more. In 1939 he won a second International University Games medal, clearing 3.90 m for third place.

Ljungberg set his personal pole vault best, 4.15 m, in 1935, breaking Henry Lindblad's Swedish record of 4.13 m from the 1931 Finnkampen. The new record lasted until 1946, when Lars Andrén cleared 4.16 m. Ljungberg's personal best in the triple jump was 14.73 m from 1934.
