= José Culí =

Spanish pole vaulter

Personal information
- Nationality: Spanish
- Born: 1 June 1906
- Died: 11 September 1971 (aged 65)

Sport
- Sport: Athletics
- Event: Pole vault

José Culí (1 June 1906 – 11 September 1971) was a Spanish athlete. He competed in the men's pole vault at the 1928 Summer Olympics.
