= Jack Fish (American football) =

American football coach

Personal information
- Born: May 1, 1892; Massachusetts, U.S.
- Died: June 29, 1971 (aged 79); Leesburg, Virginia, U.S.

Career history
- Football: Seton Hall Prep (NJ) (1925–1926) Head coach; Newark Tornadoes (1930) Co-head coach; Baseball: Seton Hall (1926–1927) Head coach
- Coaching profile at Pro Football Reference

Manus John Fish (May 1, 1892 – June 29, 1971) was an American football and baseball coach. He served as the head coach of the Newark Tornadoes of the National Football League (NFL) in 1930. In 1930, the Tornadoes moved to Newark from Orange, New Jersey. The team then hired Fish and Andy Salata to serve as co-coaches. Neither man had ever coached in the NFL before. Under the two coaches the Tornadoes were 1–11, finishing last in the league.
