= Charles McGinnis =

American pole vaulter (1906–1995)

Medal record

Men's athletics

Representing the United States

Olympic Games
Bronze medal – third place	1928 Amsterdam	Pole vault

Charles English McGinnis (October 4, 1906 – April 29, 1995) was an American track and field athlete who competed mainly in the pole vault.

He competed for the United States in the 1928 Summer Olympics held in Amsterdam, Netherlands in the high jump and the pole vault. He won the bronze medal in the pole vault.

McGinnis attended the University of Wisconsin, lettering for the Badgers from 1925 to 1927. He won the 1925 Big Ten Conference indoor high jump title at 6 feet, 2 1/2 inches and earned All-America honors in 1926 by placing sixth in the high jump at 6-feet, 4 1/2 inch. McGinnis led the Badgers to the 1927 Big Ten team title after winning the pole vault at 12-7, the 60-yard high hurdles in 7.6 seconds, and the high jump at 6-5. He added Big Ten Outdoor titles in the 120-yard high hurdles in 15.2 seconds and the pole vault at 13-3 as a senior in 1927.

McGinnis served as the team captain in 1927. He was inducted into the UW Athletic Hall of Fame in 1993.
