= Pierre Ramadier =

French pole vaulter (1902–1983)

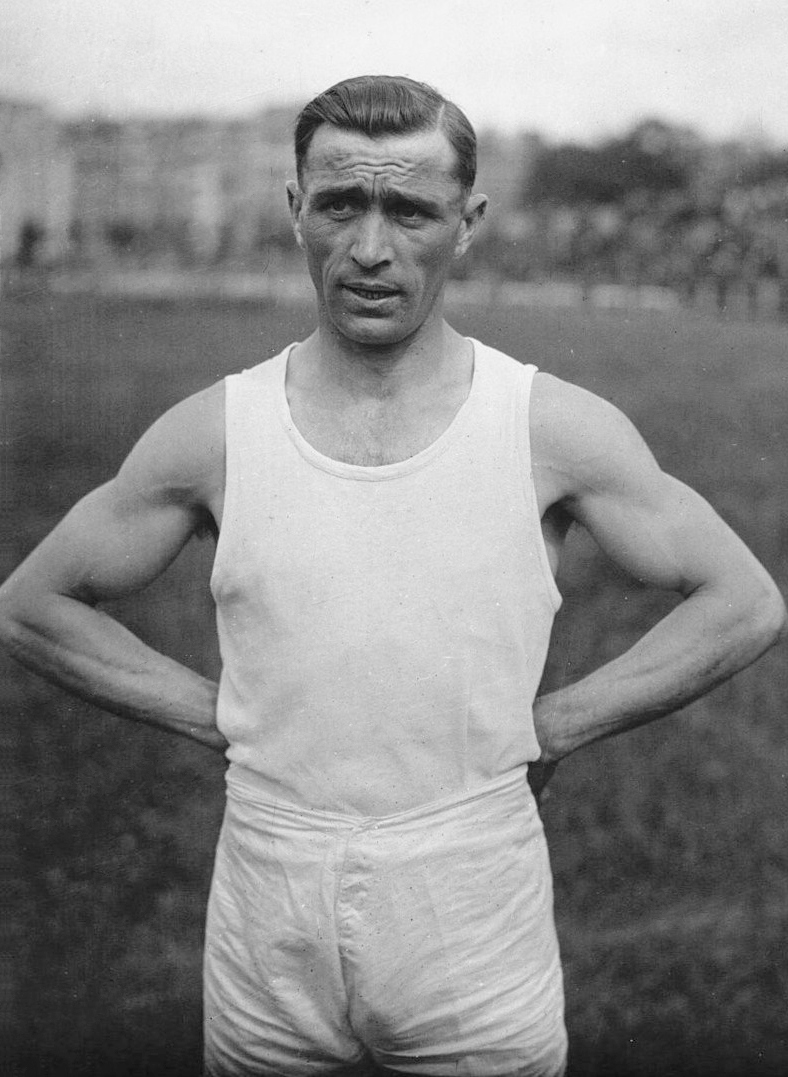
- Ramadier in 1931

Personal information
- Born: 22 May 1902 Lunel, France
- Died: 11 June 1983 (aged 81) Lodève, France
- Height: 171 cm (5 ft 7 in)
- Weight: 69 kg (152 lb)

Sport
- Sport: Athletics
- Event: Pole vault
- Club: Racing Club de France; Décathlon Club de France, Paris

Achievements and titles
- Personal best: 4.07 m – (1931)
Medal record
Men's athletics
Representing France
European Championships
Bronze medal – third place	1938 Paris	Pole vault

Pierre Louis Ramadier (22 May 1902 – 11 June 1983) was a French pole vaulter who competed at the 1936 Summer Olympics.

== Biography ==
Ramadier finished fifth and third at the 1934 and 1938 European Championships, and 17th at the 1936 Olympic Games in Berlin.

Ramadier finished second behind Keith Brown in the pole vault event at the 1935 AAA Championships.
