= Glenn Graham (athlete) =

American pole vaulter

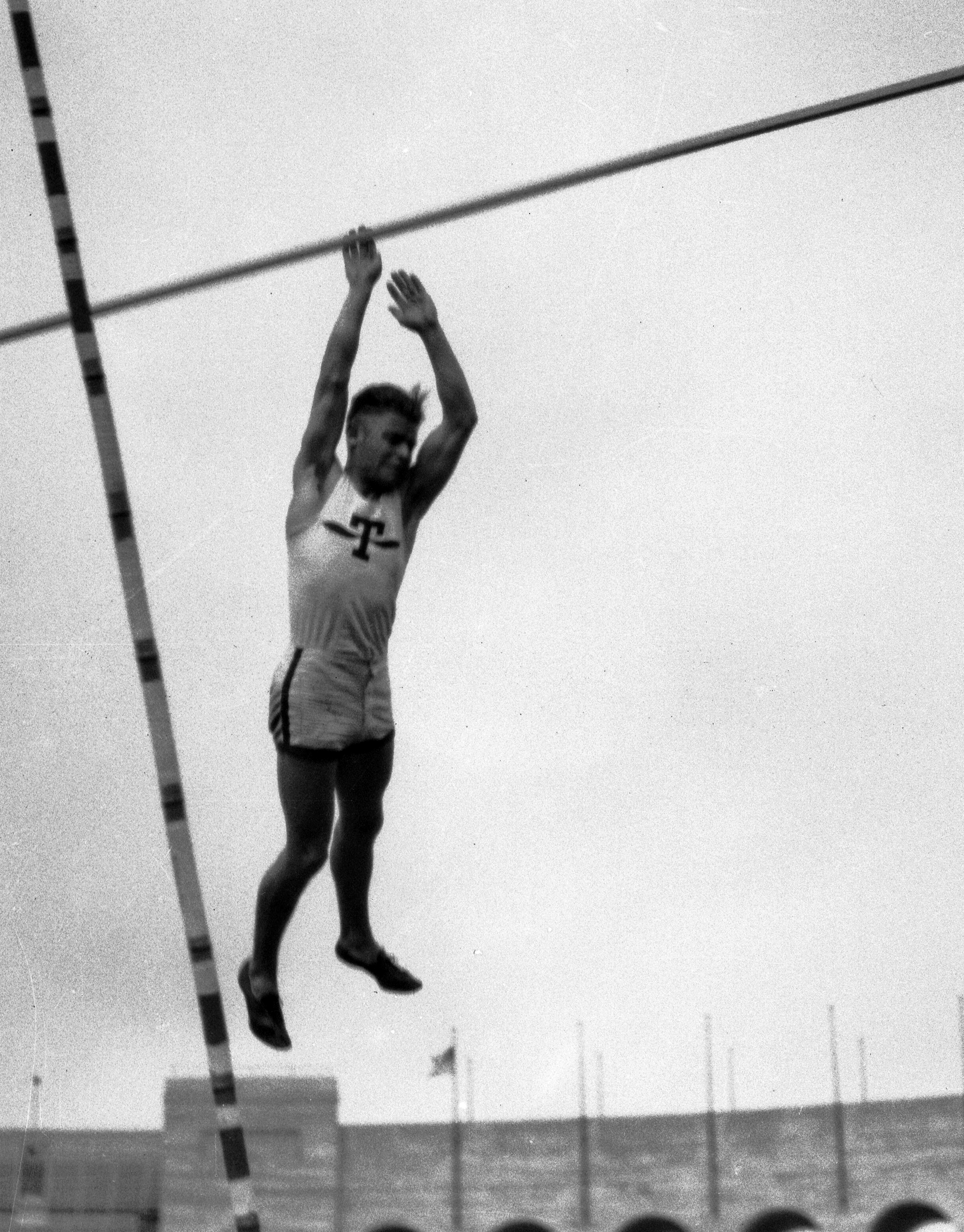

Medal record

Men's athletics

Representing the United States

Olympic Games
Silver medal – second place	1924 Paris	Pole vault

Glenn Graham (January 17, 1904 – July 19, 1986) was an American athlete who competed in the men's pole vault. He competed in Athletics at the 1924 Summer Olympics in Paris and won silver, behind fellow American pole vaulter Lee Barnes who won gold.

Graham competed for the Caltech Beavers track and field team.
