= Robert Vintousky =

French pole vaulter

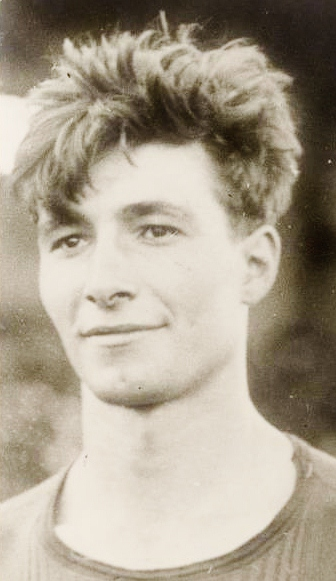
- Robert Vintousky in 1922

Personal information
- Nationality: French
- Born: 19 June 1902 Beaune, Côte-d'Or, France
- Died: 8 January 1995 (aged 92) Lamonzie-Montastruc, Dordogne, France
- Height: 181 cm (5 ft 11 in)
- Weight: 75 kg (165 lb)

Sport
- Sport: Athletics
- Event: Pole vault
- Club: Stade français, Paris

Robert Claudius Vintousky (19 June 1902 – 8 January 1995) was a French athlete who competed at the 1928 Summer Olympics.

== Biography ==
At the 1928 Summer Olympics in Amsterdam, he competed in the men's pole vault.

Vintousky finished third behind Keith Brown in the pole vault event at the 1935 AAA Championships.
