= Stefan Adamczak =

Polish pole vaulter (1892–1939)

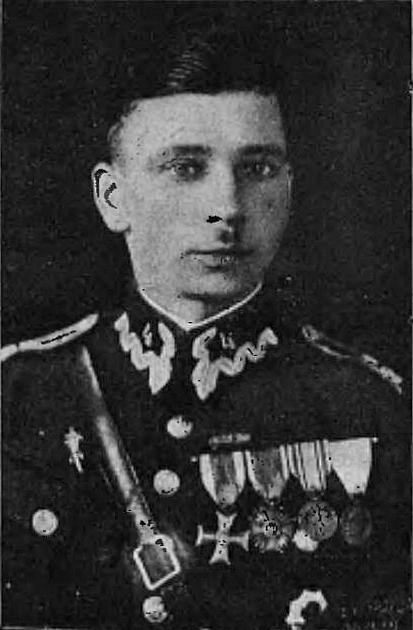
- Adamczak wearing the uniform of the Central Military School of Gymnastics and Sports in Poznań

Personal information
- Nationality: Polish
- Born: 27 November 1892 Mansfeld, Germany
- Died: September 1939 (aged 46) Katowice, Poland
- Height: 1.75 m (5 ft 9 in)
- Weight: 73 kg (161 lb)

Sport
- Sport: Athletics
- Event: Pole vault

Stefan Adamczak (27 November 1892 – September 1939) was a Polish pole vaulter and chorąży in the Polish Army. He competed in the 1924 Summer Olympics.

During World War I, he fought in the ranks of the Imperial German Army. Following Poland's restoration of independence in 1918, he joined Polish military forces. He fought in Polish-Soviet War and Polish-Ukrainian War. In September 1939, he took part in the defense of the city of Katowice during the German invasion of Poland, where he was most likely killed.
