= Maurice Henrijean =

Belgian pole vaulter

Personal information
- Nationality: Belgian
- Born: 13 February 1903
- Died: 24 October 1940 (aged 37)

Sport
- Sport: Athletics
- Event: Pole vault

Maurice Henrijean (13 February 1903 – 24 October 1940) was a Belgian athlete. He competed in the men's pole vault at the 1924 Summer Olympics and the 1928 Summer Olympics.
