= Sabin Carr =

American pole vaulter (1904–1983)

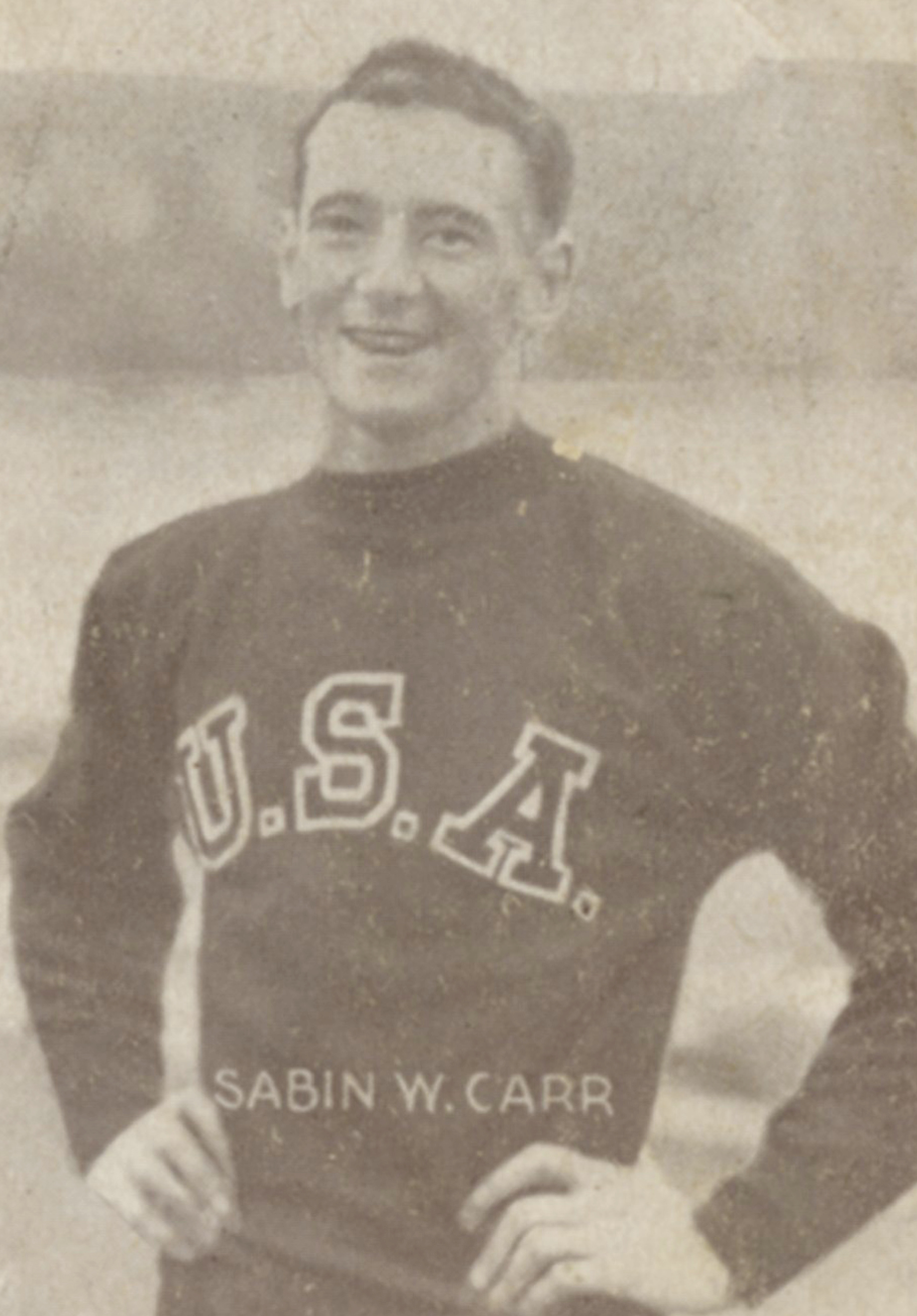
- Sabin Carr

Medal record

Men's athletics

Representing the United States

Summer Olympics
Gold medal – first place	1928 Amsterdam	Pole vault

Sabin William Carr (September 4, 1904, in Dubuque, Iowa – September 12, 1983, in Santa Barbara, California) was an American athlete who competed in the men's pole vault. He competed in Athletics at the 1928 Summer Olympics in Amsterdam and won gold.
In 1927, Sabin Carr set new indoor and outdoor world records. In early February, he took the indoor record up to 13 ft 7 1/8 in (4.14 m), which he improved one week later to 13 ft 9 1/4 in (4.20 m). In May, at the IC4A outdoor, he became the first man to clear 14 ft (4.27 m), then in 1928, at the AAU indoor, he vaulted 14 ft 1 in (4.29 m) to become the first to clear 14 feet indoors. In 1928, Carr lost his world outdoor record to the 1924 Olympic champion, Lee Barnes, but at the Olympics, Carr got his revenge – he took the gold medal, with Barnes finishing fifth. Carr, a Yale graduate, had a fine record in major championships, winning the AAU indoor twice, the IC4A outdoor three times, and the IC4A indoor twice; however he never placed better than third at the AAU outdoor meet. Carr eventually went into the lumber business in Oakland, California, and became president of the Sterling Lumber Co.

Records
Preceded by (Norway) Charles Hoff	Men's Pole Vault World Record Holder; May 27, 1927 – April 28, 1928	Succeeded by (United States) Lee Barnes
