= Charles Hoff =

Norwegian sprinter (1902–1985)

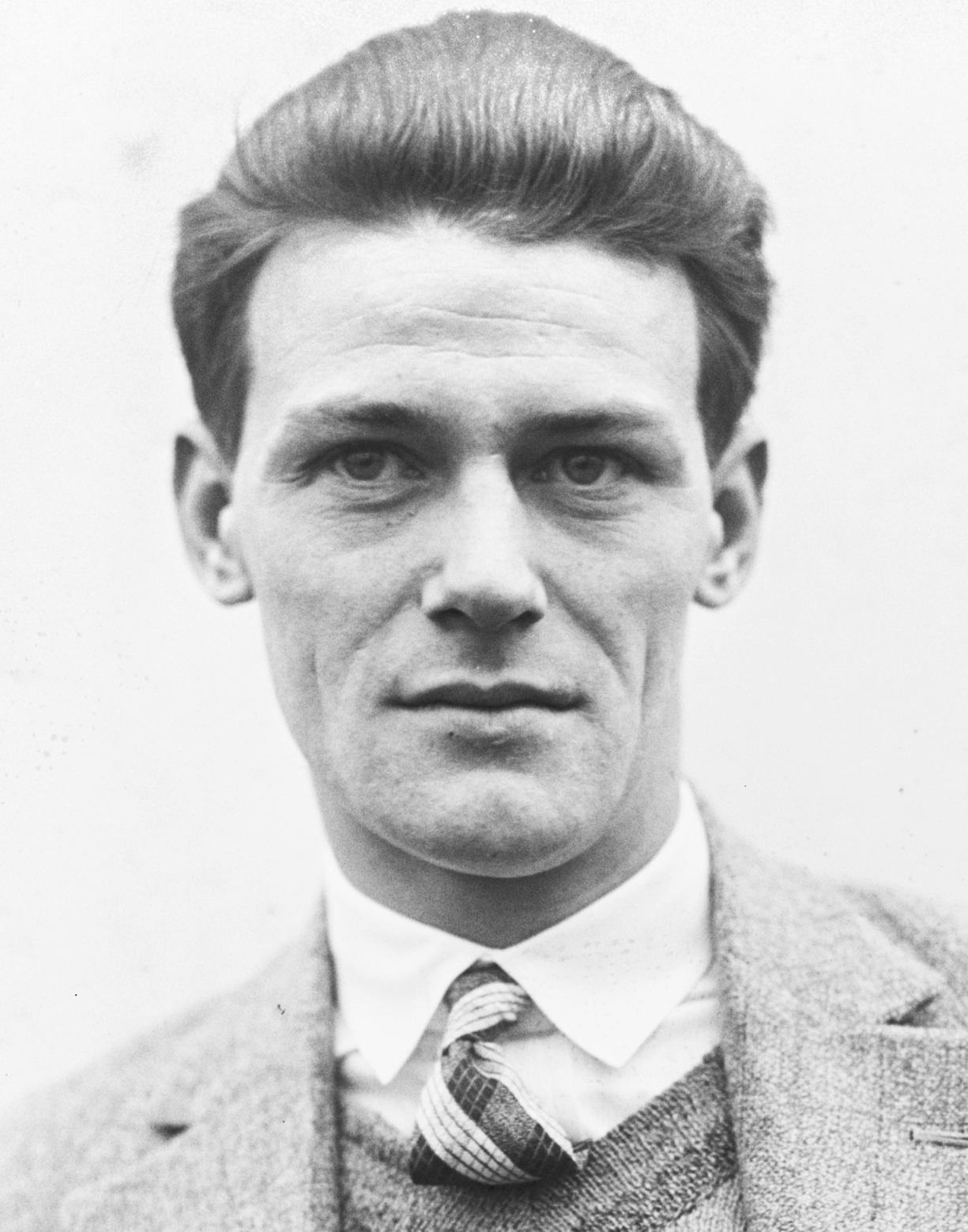

Personal information
- Born: 9 May 1902 Glemmen, Fredrikstad, Norway
- Died: 19 February 1985 (aged 83) Oslo, Norway

Sport
- Sport: Athletics
- Event: long jump / pole vault
- Club: Torshaug IF, Oslo

Charles Teilmann Hoff (9 May 1902 – 19 February 1985) was a Norwegian athlete, coach, sports journalist, novelist and sports administrator. As an active athlete he competed in pole vault, long jump, triple jump, sprints and middle distance running events. He set four world records in the pole vault during his career, became Norwegian champion ten times in different events, and competed in the 1924 Summer Olympics. In 1926 he was excluded from the sport for professionalism. After his time as an athlete he took up a career as a sports journalist. During World War II he was a sports leader under the Nazi rule, leading the Norwegian Confederation of Sports from 1942 to 1944.

== Early life ==
He was born in Fredrikstad as the son of mechanic Karl Ludvig Hoff and his wife Olga Kristine Karlsen. After taking the examen artium in 1921, he moved to Kristiania to attend the Norwegian National Academy of Craft and Art Industry. He also briefly attended the Norwegian National Academy of Fine Arts as well as a painting school in Paris.

== Athletics career ==
Hoff set his first world record in the pole vault on 22 July 1922 in Copenhagen with 4.12 metres. He increased this record to 4.21 metres exactly one year later in the same city, then to 4.23 metres on 13 August 1925 in Oslo, and finally on 27 September 1925 when he jumped 4.25 metres at a meet in Turku. The record stood until May 1927, when American Sabin Carr jumped 4.27 metres. Hoff was the first Norwegian athlete to establish a world record, the only to do so before World War II, and the only Norwegian ever to do so in a jumping event. After World War II, world records have been set by several Norwegian throwers and runners: Sverre Strandli, Audun Boysen, Egil Danielsen, Terje Pedersen, Grete Waitz, Ingrid Kristiansen and Trine Hattestad.

Hoff won two British AAA Championships titles in the long jump and pole jump events at the 1922 AAA Championships.

Internationally he competed at the 1924 Summer Olympics, in both 400 and 800 metres. He reached the semi-final in the 400 metres and finished eighth in the 800 metres final. He did not participate in the pole vault due to an injured ankle. He was the Norwegian champion in the 200 metres from 1923 and 1924, in the 400 metres from 1924, in the pole vault from 1922, 1923, 1924, 1925 and 1933, and in the triple jump from 1922 and 1923. Representing the sports club Torshaug IF, Hoff won the King's Cup twice. In total he held fourteen Norwegian records in 200, 400 and 800 metres, long jump and pole vault.

In the winter of 1926, Hoff toured the United States, staging show competitions as a part of a varieté performance group. Among other things he beat Olympic gold medalist Harold Osborn in a heptathlon competition. He also set several unofficial world indoor records. Following this tour, however, he was considered to be a professional sportsperson. This affected his eligibility to compete in the sport of athletics as a whole, since the sport was governed under amateur rules at the time. Hoff explained that the paid performances were necessary to earn a living, as the Amateur Athletic Union had withheld some money that had been promised to Hoff in advance, but to no avail. Thus, when jumping a new world record of 4.32 metres in Hønefoss on 27 September 1931, the record was not ratified by the International Amateur Athletics Federation.

== Non-active career ==
In December 1925 he married Heddy Aubert, a daughter of the Director General of Norsk Hydro, Axel Aubert. The marriage was dissolved after a few years, but Hoff married for the second time, this time to Aase Synnøve Bing Nilsen. Hoff was also a brother-in-law of Per Mørch Hansson.

From 1927 to 1936 he was the editor of the sports magazine Sportsmanden. He made his mark on Sportsmanden by emphasizing sensationalist news, front-page headlines and the inclusion of pictures. The overall layout, which Hoff in retrospect described as "revolutionary", was inspired by his time in the United States. As a writer he was not uncontroversial, though, and after he was found guilty of libel, he was pressured by the magazine owner to resign. He found a new job as sports editor of Oslo Illustrerte from 1936 to 1940, and also wrote for the Nasjonal Samling party newspaper Fritt Folk in the late 1930s. He was also a coach in the Norwegian Athletics Association.

=== World War II ===
When Norway was invaded by Germany in April 1940, many Norwegian athletes volunteered to fight in the Norwegian Campaign. Hoff then made his mark as he called on the fighters to lay down their weapons and return to the sports field. For this he was sacked by the Norwegian Athletics Association. However, Germany was able to establish an occupation of Norway, and soon moved to tighten their grip on Norwegian society. At this point Hoff contacted the Reichskommissariat to propose a Nazi reorganization of sports life in Norway. In September 1940 he was given the position as deputy under-secretary of state in the new Ministry of Labour and Sports, which was headed by Axel Heiberg Stang. He also joined the Nasjonal Samling at that time.

However, the Nazi interference with sports resulted in a nationwide boycott of official athletics meetings in Norway from the end of 1940. When the reorganization of sports life was implemented in November 1940, the Germans, knowing that Hoff was unpopular, kept him out of the spotlight. Egil Reichborn-Kjennerud was installed as leader of the Norwegian Confederation of Sports, while Hoff used the Hird as an arena for his work. In the spring of 1942, it became clear that Reichborn-Kjennerud had failed to deal with the still-ongoing sports boycott, and Hoff became the new leader of the Confederation of Sports. He had a number of grand plans; sports in Norway should be state-led, and the aim was to produce a broad range of athletes rather than a few stars. In addition to the physical dimension, the "spiritual" dimension should be emphasized. He originally received generous funding, but from 1943 Germany lost interest in his projects, and in 1944 the projects were largely disestablished. Hoff protested this decision, and was removed from his position as a result.

=== Post-war life ===
As a part of the legal purge in Norway after World War II in 1947 he was sentenced to nine years of forced labour. A number of his ideas were actually realized some years later, including a national school of sport sciences and a state-owned gambling company. Norsk Tipping was established already in 1948, and the Norwegian School of Sport Sciences in 1968.

After serving his sentence, Hoff worked as an editor in the publishing house Hauge & Co. In 1952 he published the crime novel Døden i Bygdø Allé, under the pseudonym Texas Bang. He had formerly published the novel Systemet in 1925 as well as a retelling of his experiences in the United States, titled Fra New York til Hollywood. Mine oplevelser i Amerika, in 1927. Hoff died in 1985 in Oslo.

Records
Preceded by Frank Foss	World record holder, men's pole vault 1922–1927	Succeeded by Sabin Carr
