= Julius Müller (pole vaulter) =

German pole vaulter

Personal information
- Full name: Julius Josef Müller
- Nationality: German
- Born: 10 May 1903 Rottenburg, Germany
- Died: 1 April 1984 (aged 80) Kuchen, West Germany

Sport
- Sport: Athletics
- Event: Pole vault

Julius Müller (10 May 1903 – 1 April 1984) was a German athlete. He competed in the men's pole vault at the 1928 Summer Olympics and the 1936 Summer Olympics.
