= Henry Lindblad =

Swedish pole vaulter and decathlete

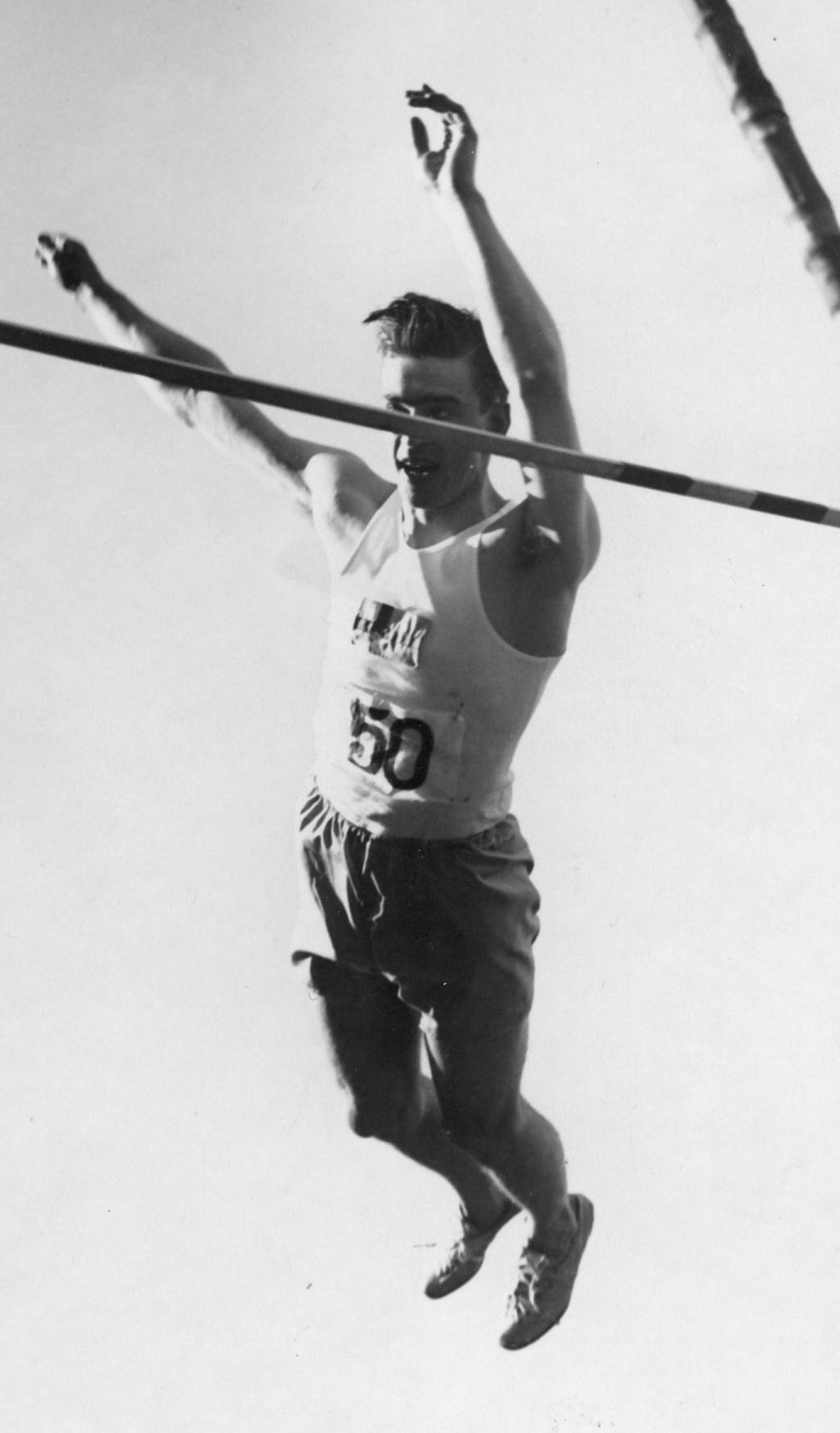

Personal information
- Born: 25 February 1906 Katrineholm, Sweden
- Died: 28 September 1946 (aged 40) Borås, Sweden
- Height: 1.89 m (6 ft 2 in)
- Weight: 87 kg (192 lb)

Sport
- Sport: Athletics
- Events: Pole vault, decathlon
- Club: Kronobergs IK, Stockholm

Achievements and titles
- Personal bests: PV – 4.13 m (1931); Dec – 5906 (1928)

Bror Henry Lindblad (25 February 1906 – 28 September 1946) was a Swedish pole vaulter and decathlete. The first Swede to vault four metres or more, he was Swedish pole vault champion seven times and AAA champion three times. At the 1928 Summer Olympics in Amsterdam he competed in the pole vault and decathlon, finishing in the top ten in both events.

== Career ==
Lindblad won the first of his seven Swedish pole vault titles in 1925. In 1927 he won the British AAA Championships, clearing 3.81 m. during the 1927 AAA Championships. In July 1928, ahead of the Olympics, he jumped 3.92 m in Stockholm, his first Swedish record.

At the Olympics Lindblad took part in both the pole vault and the decathlon. He was the best European in the pole vault, clearing 3.90 m and placing seventh. In the decathlon he was ninth, scoring 7071.425 points (5906 with modern scoring tables). Although he was a specialist, he did not win the decathlon pole vault as he only managed 3.60 m; he did, however, win the decathlon long jump with a leap of 6.97 m. After returning home he improved his Swedish pole vault record to 4.00 m, the first Swede and only the third European (after Charles Hoff and Henry Petersen) to vault four metres or more. He also won his second Swedish title that year.

In 1930 Lindblad won both the Swedish and British pole vault championships, a feat he repeated in 1931. He set his eventual personal best (4.13 m) in winning the 1931 Finnkampen, holding the Swedish record until Bo Ljungberg cleared 4.15 m four years later. Lindblad won further Swedish titles in 1933, 1936 and 1937 and placed seventh at the inaugural European Championships in 1934.
