= Lee Barnes =

American athletics competitor

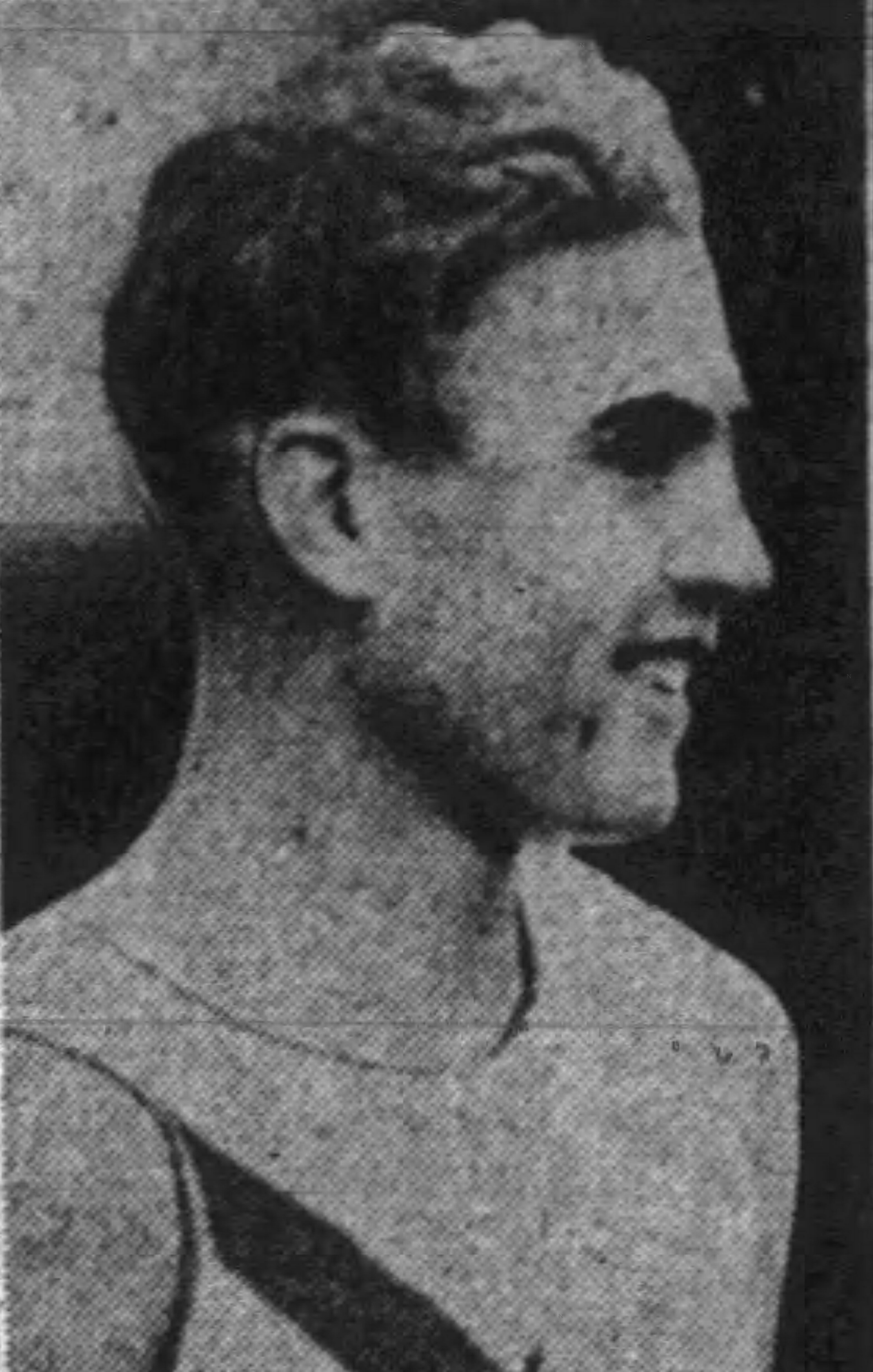
- Barnes circa 1926

Personal information
- Nationality: American
- Born: July 16, 1906
- Died: December 28, 1970 (aged 64)
Medal record
Olympic medal record
Men's athletics
Representing the United States
Gold medal – first place	1924 Paris	Pole vault

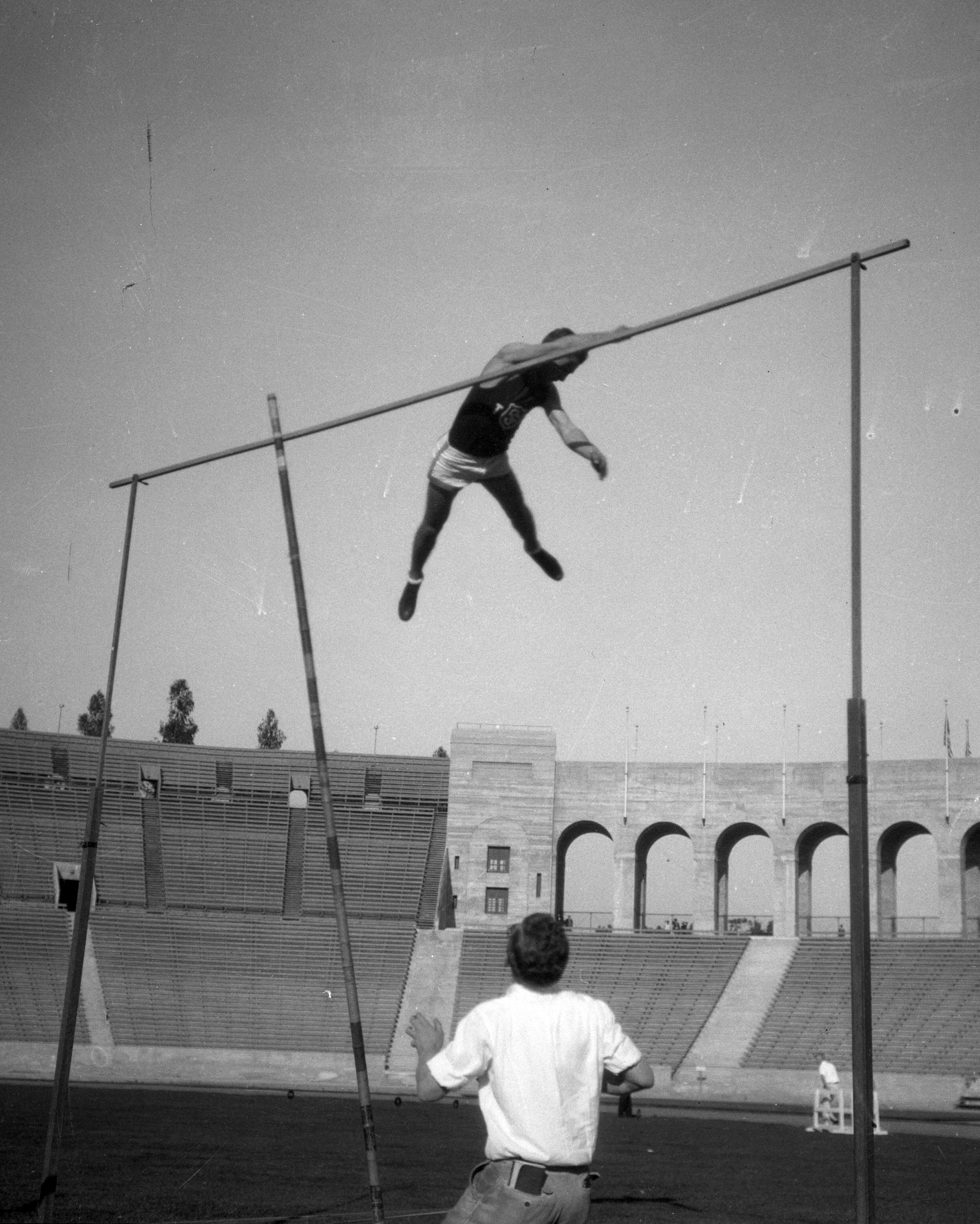
At the 1926 AAU Relays

Lee Stratford Barnes (July 16, 1906 – December 28, 1970) was an American athlete from Utah who competed in the men's pole vault. He was born in Salt Lake City, Utah and died in Oxnard, California.

Barnes attended the University of Southern California in Los Angeles. He competed in Athletics at the 1924 Summer Olympics in Paris and won gold, beating fellow American pole vaulter Glenn Graham, who received silver.

Barnes has the honor of being the only known stunt double for silent film star Buster Keaton during Keaton's independent years of film making. In Keaton's 1927 feature College, Barnes performed a pole vault through an open upper-story window.

Records
Preceded by (United States) Sabin Carr	Men's Pole Vault World Record Holder; April 28, 1928 – July 16, 1932	Succeeded by (United States) Bill Graber
