= Deaths in October 1979 =

The following is a list of notable deaths in October 1979. Entries for each day are listed alphabetically by surname. A typical entry lists information in the following sequence:

- Name, age, country of citizenship at birth, subsequent country of citizenship (if applicable), reason for notability, cause of death (if known), and reference.

== October 1979 ==
=== 1 ===
- Dorothy Arzner, 82, American film director.
- Sir Robert Cary, 1st Baronet, 81, British politician, MP (1935–1945, 1951–1974).
- Lucie Chevalley, 97, French humanitarian.
- Alfred Leland Crabb, 95, American historian and novelist.
- Chandra Singh Garhwali, 87, Indian politician.
- Nikolay Glazkov, 60, Soviet poet.
- Roy Harris, 81, American composer, stroke.
- Yaeko Mizutani, 74, Japanese actress, breast cancer.
- Harry Persson, 81, Swedish boxer.
- Preguinho, 74, Brazilian footballer.

=== 2 ===
- Maurice Broun, 73, American ornithologist, botanist and conservationist, cancer.
- Jean Bruchési, 78, Canadian diplomat and historian.
- Brian Castor, 89, British cricketer.
- Jan Fortune, 86, American journalist and screenwriter.
- Henri Galliard, 87, French parasitologist.
- Ray Genet, 48, American mountaineer, hypothermia.
- Jean Jourlin, 74, French Olympic wrestler (1928, 1936).
- Kenneth Lamplugh, 77, British Anglican prelate.
- Nigel Love, 87, Australian aviator.
- Joseph M. Marling, 75, American Roman Catholic prelate.
- Sergio Martínez, 36, Cuban Olympic racing cyclist (1968).
- Hannelore Schmatz, 39, German mountaineer, hypothermia.
- John C. Traphagen, 89, American banker.
- Ernst Wulf, 57, East German political activist.

=== 3 ===
- John Gordon A'Bear, 66, English rugby player.
- William Aloisio, 72, American mobster.
- W. Russell Arrington, 73, American politician and lawyer, member of the Illinois House of Representatives (1945–1953) and Senate (1955–1973).
- Roy Bence, 79, Australian footballer.
- Marcos Caplán, 74, Argentine actor.
- Corky Corcoran, 55, American jazz saxophonist.
- Jordi Folch Pi, 68, Spanish-American biochemist.
- André Godinat, 76, French racing cyclist.
- Claudia Jennings, 29, American actress and model, traffic collision.
- Edith Kanakaʻole, 65, American dancer and composer, cancer.
- Helen Johns Kirtland, 89, American photojournalist.
- Con Leventhal, 83, Irish literary critic.
- Dorothy Peterson, 81, American actress.
- Nicos Poulantzas, 43, Greek sociologist, suicide.
- Armi Ratia, 67, Finnish businesswoman.
- Jack Smart, 88, English cricketer.
- Humberto Teixeira, 64, Brazilian musician and politician.
- Anna Warouw, 81, Indonesian physician.
- Charles W. White, 61, American artist, heart failure.

=== 4 ===
- Stan Andrews, 66, New Zealand cricketer.
- Warwick Bastian, 64, Australian Anglican prelate.
- Sir Natwarsinhji Bhavsinhji, 78, Indian royal and cricketer, maharaja of Porbandar (1908–1948).
- Les Cocker, 55, English football player and manager.
- Harry Domela, 73–74, Russian-born German royal impostor.
- Ted Fritsch, 58, American football player, heart attack.
- Fred Graf, 90, American baseball player.
- Boentaran Martoatmodjo, 83, Indonesian politician and physician.
- Theo Pabst, 74, German architect.
- Gerard Rissik, 76, South African banker and economist.
- P. Subramaniam, 74, Indian filmmaker.
- Cyril John Vogel, 74, American Roman Catholic prelate, heart attack.

=== 5 ===
- Don Magnuson, 68, American politician and journalist, member of the U.S. House of Representatives (1953–1963), heart attack.
- Joseph Raseta, 92, Malagasy politician.
- Ken Strong, 73, American football player, heart attack.

=== 6 ===
- Renato Bacigalupo, 71, Italian Olympic swimmer (1924).
- Elizabeth Bishop, 68, American poet and author, cerebral aneurysm.
- Dudley E. Littlewood, 76, British mathematician.
- Marshall Allen Neill, 65, American judge, cancer.
- Kiku Nishizaki, 66, Japanese aviator.
- Anastasios Orlandos, 91, Greek architect and architectural historian.
- Ľudmila Pajdušáková, 63, Slovak astronomer.
- Konstantinos Papaioannou, 79–80, Greek physicist and mathematician.
- Datto Vaman Potdar, 89, Indian academic administrator and historian.
- Chapman Revercomb, 84, American politician, member of the U.S. Senate (1943–1949, 1956–1959), pneumonia.
- Raymond Wolf, 75, American football and baseball player and coach, cancer.
- Yip Ho Nung, 69, Australian restaurateur and Chinese community leader.

=== 7 ===
- Charles E. Bernard, 86, American aviator and businessman.
- Spencer Block, 71, English cricketer.
- George Grigor, 63, Canadian ice hockey player.
- Jerzy Petersburski, 84, Polish pianist and composer.
- George Retzer, 96, American Olympic wrestler (1912).
- Edwin Schell, 78, American Olympic boxer (1920).
- Sir Geoffrey Streatfeild, 82, British judge.

=== 8 ===
- Sir Brian Edmund Baker, 83, British flying ace and air marshal.
- H. D. Chalke, 82, British physician and journal editor.
- Robert Finlay, 56, Scottish rugby player.
- Emmaline Henry, 50, American actress (I Dream of Jeannie), brain cancer.
- David Izenzon, 47, American jazz bassist, heart attack.
- Kim Hyong-uk, 54, South Korean general, shot. (death presumed on this date)
- Sir Norman Martin, 86, Australian politician.
- Walt McGaw, 79, American football player.
- Audax Minor, 92, Canadian-American journalist.
- Jayaprakash Narayan, 76, Indian politician, kidney failure.
- June Nash, 68, American actress.
- Carroll C. Pratt, 85, American psychologist and musicologist.
- Edith S. Sampson, 77, American diplomat and judge.
- Joseph Vandor, 69, Hungarian Roman Catholic priest.

=== 9 ===
- József Mátyás Baló, 83, Hungarian physician.
- Ignatius Bedros XVI Batanian, 80, Ottoman-born Lebanese Armenian Catholic prelate.
- Leo Binz, 78, American Roman Catholic prelate.
- Louis Diage, 74, American set decorator.
- Theodor Eyrich, 86, Danish Olympic rower (1912, 1920).
- John Carver Meadows Frost, 63–64, British aircraft designer, heart attack.
- Ernie Harper, 77, English Olympic runner (1924, 1928, 1936).
- Maxwell Ralph Jacobs, 74, Australian forester.
- Friedrich Merz, 94, German pharmacist and entepreneur.
- Nur Muhammad Taraki, 62, Afghan politician and writer, president (1978–1979), asphyxiated.

=== 10 ===
- Heinrich Behnke, 81, German mathematician.
- John Nicholas Brown II, 79, American philanthropist and government official, heart attack.
- Rachel Darden Davis, 74, American politician, member of the North Carolina House of Representatives (1959–1963).
- Abelardo de Lamare, 86, Brazilian footballer.
- Charles de Worms, 76, English chemist and entomologist.
- Zofia Dziurzyńska-Rosińska, 83, Polish painter.
- Christopher Evans, 48, British computer scientist, cancer.
- Guido Fanconi, 87, Swiss pediatrician.
- Fred Graham, 70, American actor and stuntman.
- Len Hill, 80, English footballer.
- Margit Ladomerszky, 74, Hungarian actress.
- Daniel MacDonald, 71, Canadian Olympic wrestler (1928, 1932).
- Patrick Man, 66, British general.
- Lewis Allen McGee, 85, American priest and civil rights activist.
- Paul Paray, 93, French conductor and composer.
- Anton Refregier, 74, Russian-born American muralist.
- Chi Che Wang, 85, Chinese-American biochemist.

=== 11 ===
- Lou Bastien, 63, American professional wrestler, heart attack.
- Lennart Bohman, 70, Swedish Olympic boxer (1928).
- Abe Bowman, 86, American baseball player.
- Marshall Dillon, 54, Australian cricketer.
- Joseíto Fernández, 71, Cuban singer and songwriter.
- Marcus Glasscock, 79, Australian footballer.
- Roger Hayward, 80, American artist and inventor.
- Franciszek Leja, 94, Polish mathematician.
- Andrey Markov Jr., 76, Soviet mathematician.
- Wylle B. McNeal, 94, American home economist and educator.
- Nadezhda Nadezhdina, 71/75, Soviet dancer and choreographer.
- Walt Speck, 83, American painter.
- Livinus van de Bundt, 70, Dutch artist.
- Louis Wolfson II, 52, American politician, member of the Florida House of Representatives (1963–1973), heart attack.

=== 12 ===
- Katharine Burr Blodgett, 81, American chemist and physicist.
- Andries du Plessis, 69, South African Olympic track and field athlete (1936).
- Samuel Fisher, Baron Fisher of Camden, 74, British politician and businessman.
- Rene Gagnon, 54, American soldier.
- Carlos Giudice, 73, Chilean footballer.
- Turid Haaland, 71, Norwegian actress.
- Toru Hagiwara, 73, Japanese diplomat.
- Ayyalasomayajula Lalitha, 60, Indian engineer, cerebral aneurysm.
- Celia Lovsky, 82, Austrian-American actress.
- Jack Lynch, 73, Australian footballer.
- Molly Macalister, 59, New Zealand artist.
- V. Manickavasagam, 53, Malaysian politician.
- Charlotte Mineau, 93, American actress.
- Michael Pocock, 59, English oil executive (Shell).
- Waloddi Weibull, 92, Swedish mathematician and engineer.

=== 13 ===
- Chang Kia-ngau, 89, Chinese banker and politician.
- Rebecca Clarke, 93, British composer and violist.
- Herschel L. Mosier, 79, American football and basketball player and coach.
- Clarence Muse, 89, American actor (Hearts in Dixie), filmmaker and songwriter.
- Archibald Roosevelt, 85, American soldier, businessman and political activist, son of Theodore Roosevelt, stroke.
- Giovanni Sansone, 91, Italian mathematician.
- André van Gyseghem, 73, English actor and theatre director.
- Calixto Zaldivar, 75, Filipino judge and politician.

=== 14 ===
- Lasse Dahlquist, 69, Swedish singer, songwriter and actor, laryngeal cancer.
- Onorato Damen, 85, Italian politician and writer.
- Viktor Linnarz, 85, German general.
- Jack Meakins, 44, Canadian football player.
- Arthur Mendel, 74, American musicologist, leukemia.
- E. R. Moulton, 79, American football and baseball player and coach.
- John Christopher Smuts, 69, South African-born British barrister and politician.
- Peter Trainor, 64, English footballer.

=== 15 ===
- Poppy Baring, 77, British socialite and businesswoman.
- Gus Cannon, 96, American blues musician.
- Jacob L. Devers, 92, American general.
- Leslie Grade, 63, British talent agent.
- Arthur Hilton, 82, British-American filmmaker.
- Noel Hood, 69, British actress.
- Yelena Kuzmina, 70, Soviet actress.
- Ottavio Michelini, 73, Italian Roman Catholic priest.
- Kathryn Bache Miller, 83, American art collector and philanthropist.
- Mary Kimberly Shirk, 99, American philanthropist and clubwoman.
- Pilar de Valderrama, 90, Spanish poet and playwright.
- Maurice Vautier, 78, French Olympic pole vaulter (1924).

=== 16 ===
- Johan Borgen, 77, Norwegian writer and literary critic.
- Vincent Flemmi, 44, American mobster, drug overdose.
- Fred Haslam, 82, English-Canadian peace activist.
- Alex Johnstone, 83, Scottish footballer.
- Frank Rydzewski, 86, American football player.
- Predrag Sarić, 58, Croatian Olympic rower (1948).
- Esther Mae Scott, 86, American blues musician, complications from a stroke.
- Olav Svalastog, 83, Norwegian politician.
- Jukka Tyrkkö, 67, Finnish journalist and Nazi propagandist.
- Michele Valori, 56, Italian architect and urban designer.

=== 17 ===
- Jesse Aaron, 92, American sculptor and woodcarver.
- Pierre Bernac, 80, French singer and musicologist, heart attack.
- George Biskup, 68, American Roman Catholic prelate.
- Walter S. Davis, 74, American academic administrator and football coach.
- Maud Frère, 56, Belgian writer, fall.
- Walter Gonzalez, 55, Bolivian engineer, pancreatic cancer.
- Gerry Lowrey, 74, Canadian ice hockey player.
- André Matsangaissa, 28–29, Mozambican militant, shot.
- Eugenio Mendoza, 72, Venezuelan businessman and philanthropist, heart attack.
- S. J. Perelman, 75, American humorist and screenwriter (Around the World in 80 Days).
- Lil Milagro Ramírez, 34, Salvadoran revolutionary and poet, murdered.
- Karel Reiner, 69, Czech pianist and composer.
- Richard Söderberg, 84, Swedish-American engineer, cancer.
- John Stuart, 81, Scottish actor.
- Robert Vernay, 72, French filmmaker.
- Paul Wenneker, 89, German naval admiral and diplomat.
- Kenzo Yashima, 77, Japanese Olympic runner (1920).

=== 18 ===
- Joe Coomer, 62, American football player.
- James Andrew Darling, 88, Scottish-born Canadian politician.
- Francis McPhillips, 66, Australian rugby player, leukemia.
- Eivind Øygarden, 61, Norwegian politician.
- Virgilio Piñera, 67, Cuban author and playwright.
- Essi Renvall, 68, Finnish sculptor.
- Louis Unser, 83, American racing driver.
- George A. Wells, 69, American politician.
- May White, 89–90, American actress.

=== 19 ===
- Marjorie Lee Browne, 65, American mathematician, heart attack.
- John Cardwell, 83, American football player.
- Jack Chapple, 36, American football player, plane crash.
- Jerome Davis, 87, American sociologist and peace activist.
- Fritz Diez, 78, German actor.
- Clark Jarnagin, 65, American football and basketball coach.
- Giuseppe Lupis, 83, Italian politician.
- Clif Reed, 71, New Zealand author.
- Vasily Smirnov, 74, Soviet writer.

=== 20 ===
- Clara Byrd Baker, 93, American suffragist and educator.
- John Banks, 76, New Zealand cricketer.
- Luigi Capuano, 75, Italian filmmaker.
- Harold Drew, 84, American football and track and field coach.
- Fred Harris, 69, American lawyer and politician, member of the Texas Senate (1947–1951).
- Margaret Hastings, 69, American historian.
- Albert Houthuesen, 76, Dutch-born British artist.
- Ninho, 76, Brazilian footballer.
- Rayén Quitral, 62, Chilean singer and actress.
- D. K. Sapru, 63, Indian actor.
- Cy Slapnicka, 93, American baseball player and executive.
- Hedges Worthington-Eyre, 80, British Olympic runner (1920).

=== 21 ===
- Juan Aguilera, 75, Chilean footballer.
- Hans Cappelen, 75, Norwegian jurist.
- Chacho, 68, Spanish footballer.
- J. Orlean Christian, 81, American football and baseball coach.
- Anthony Cooper, 75, American baseball player.
- Clarke Fischer, 79, American football player.
- Beatrice Hicks, 60, American engineer.
- Dora Ilse, 81, German entomologist.
- Josef Kotin, 71, Soviet tank designer.
- John McKechenneay, 76, Canadian Olympic runner (1924).
- Tom Van Horn Moorehead, 81, American politician, member of the U.S. House of Representatives (1961–1963).
- Denis Preston, 62, British record producer.
- Armando Sensini, 70, Argentine Olympic runner (1948).
- Kanematsu Sugiura, 89, Japanese-American cancer researcher, stroke.

=== 22 ===
- Reinhold Baer, 77, German mathematician, heart failure.
- Robert Benjamin, 70, American film executive and lawyer.
- Jesse Bishop, 46, American convicted murderer, execution by gas chamber.
- Nadia Boulanger, 92, French music teacher, conductor and composer.
- Sir Frank Fraser Darling, 76, English conservationist and ornithologist.
- John Drebinger, 88, American sports journalist.
- Duda Enginoev, 60, Soviet soldier.
- Joseph T. Ferguson, 87, American politician.
- Mieko Kamiya, 65, Japanese psychiatrist, heart disease.
- P Kesava Menon, 61–62, Indian mathematician.
- Albert C. Miller, 81, American politician, lieutenant governor of South Dakota (1941–1945).
- Beryl Preston, 77, British Olympic sailor (1936).
- William Robert Thompson, 55, French-born Canadian psychologist, cancer.

=== 23 ===
- Antonio Caggiano, 90, Argentine Roman Catholic cardinal.
- Edward Hamilton-Hill, 70, English broadcasting executive and rugby player.
- Gilberto Hernández Ortega, 55, Dominican painter.
- Thomas Jeter, 81, American Olympic fencer (1924).
- Mary Moodley, 66, South African trade unionist and anti-Apartheid activist.
- Clarence Newton, 80, Canadian Olympic boxer (1920).
- Stephen Otu, 64, Ghanaian general.
- Roderick Ryan, 69, Australian cricketer.
- Johann Sinnhuber, 92, German general.
- Pipsan Saarinen Swanson, 74, Finnish-American textile and interior designer.
- Prodromos Tsaousakis, 60, Greek singer and songwriter, heart attack.
- Daniel B. Ullman, 61, American filmmaker.

=== 24 ===
- Carlo Abarth, 70, Italian automobile designer.
- Eleanor Robson Belmont, 99, English-American actress and theatre producer.
- S. Corinna Bille, 67, Swiss writer.
- Jimmy Farrell, 76, Irish rugby player.
- Hermann Arthur Jahn, 72, British physicist.
- Jacqueline Kahanoff, 62, Egyptian-born Israeli novelist and journalist, cancer.
- George Kennedy, 60, Australian footballer.
- Trygve Lindeman, 82, Norwegian cellist.
- Julio Porter, 63, Argentine filmmaker.
- Rae Samuels, 92, American vaudeville performer.
- John Scafide, 68, American football player and politician.
- Georg Schaltenbrand, 81, German neurologist.

=== 25 ===
- John M. Budd, 71, American railroad executive.
- Laurie Dearle, 60, Australian footballer.
- Maphevu Dlamini, 57, Swazi politician, prime minister (since 1976), cancer.
- Harry Sinclair Drago, 93, American novelist and screenwriter.
- Charles Barney Harding, 80, American banker.
- Philip Matante, 66, Motswana politician.
- Eva Puck, 86, American actress.
- Leo George Rigler, 83, American radiologist.
- Morrie Schick, 87, American baseball player.
- Fernando Soler, 83, Mexican actor and filmmaker, respiratory failure.
- Sir Gerald Templer, 81, British field marshal, lung cancer.

=== 26 ===
- Manuel Barbeyto, 77, Filipino actor.
- Sir William Brand, 91, Australian politician, MP (1954–1958).
- Minto Cato, 79, American singer.
- Bill Crump, 71, American jazz musician.
- Ray P. Dinsmore, 86, American rubber scientist.
- Alexander Jacobs, 52, English-American screenwriter.
- Bill Jones, 92, Australian footballer.
- Glory Leppänen, 77, Finnish actress and filmmaker.
- Assassination of Park Chung Hee
  - Park Chung Hee, 61, South Korean politician, president (since 1963), shot.
  - Cha Ji-chul, President's chief bodyguard
  - An Jae-song, South korean sport shooter and bodyguard
- George Parry, 70, South African cricket umpire.
- Germaine Peyroles, 77, French politician.
- Hans-Ulrich Rieker, 59, German journalist and Buddhist leader.
- Charles P. Thompson, 88, American actor.
- Veludo, 49, Brazilian footballer.
- Jennetta Vise, 67, English illustrator.

=== 27 ===
- Charles Coughlin, 88, Canadian-American Roman Catholic priest, radio personality and ultraconservative activist.
- Eric Douglas Cummings, 83, Australian flying ace.
- Sir Louis Gluckstein, 82, British politician, MP (1931–1945).
- Germaine Lubin, 89, French singer.
- Gregory Mangin, 71, American tennis player.
- John McLellan, 51, Canadian ice hockey player and coach, heart attack.
- Charles Peat, 87, British politician and cricketer, MP (1931–1945).
- Alfred Thomson, 84, English artist.
- Albert O. Vorse Jr., 65, American flying ace and naval admiral.
- Charlie Wiedemeyer, 65, American baseball player.

=== 28 ===
- Julius Chaloff, 87, American pianist and composer.
- Raymond Fritz, 80, French Olympic runner (1924).
- Joseph-Henri Guiguet, 88, French flying ace.
- Mel Ingram, 75, American baseball player and coach.
- John Gorham Palfrey, 60, American academic administrator and government official, cancer.
- Jimmie Skinner, 70, American country musician, heart attack.
- Jimmy Wallbanks, 70, English footballer.
- Clarence Wanamaker, 87, American ice hockey player and coach.

=== 29 ===
- Tiki Fulwood, 35, American drummer (Parliament-Funkadelic), stomach cancer.
- Omar Gjesteby, 80, Norwegian politician and trade unionist.
- William M. Hoge, 85, American general.
- Jørgen Holmboe, 76, Norwegian-American meteorologist.
- Bill Karr, 68, American football player.
- Józef Pluta, 47, Polish serial killer, fall.
- Johnny Rosenblatt, 71, American politician.
- Erich Schmitt, 67, Swiss Olympic handball player (1936).
- Francis Boggs Snavely, 82, American football and basketball coach.

=== 30 ===
- Tahir Badakhshi, 46, Afghan journalist and political activist, murdered.
- Dalton Bales, 59, Canadian politician, traffic collision.
- Robert Boulin, 59, French politician, suicide by drowning.
- Frank Butler, 70, American football player.
- Oscar Conti, 65, Argentine cartoonist.
- Vincent DeSimone, 61, American police detective, cancer.
- Peter Krasnow, 93, Russian-American artist.
- Mickey McBan, 60, American actor.
- Rachele Mussolini, 89, Italian socialite, widow of Benito Mussolini, heart attack.
- Vyacheslav Naumenko, 96, Soviet general and Nazi collaborator.
- Jack Nicholas Pritzker, 75, American businessman.
- John Albert Stevenson, 89, American mycologist.
- Vedpal Tyagi, 63, Indian politician and jurist.
- Raymond Vincent, 73, French Olympic diver (1924).
- Sir Barnes Wallis, 92, English aeronautical engineer (bouncing bomb).
- George Woodcock, 75, British trade unionist.

=== 31 ===
- Edvin Adolphson, 86, Swedish actor.
- Robert Lewis Baker, 42, American horticulturalist and botanist, hepatitis.
- Elias Barzilai, 87–88, Greek rabbi and humanitarian.
- Eddie Bentz, 85, American convicted bank robber, heart attack.
- Frank Dyson, 48, English rugby player.
- John Goldmark, 62, American politician, member of the Washington House of Representatives (1957–1963), lymphoma.
- Putte Kock, 78, Swedish ice hockey and football player, coach, and sports commentator.
- Paavo Kuusinen, 64, Finnish Olympic cyclist (1948).
- Marguerite Lwoff, 74, French microbiologist and virologist.
- Freddy Mésot, 74, Belgian Olympic figure skater (1924).
- Mario Tauzin, 70, French artist.
- Elvania Namukwaya Zirimu, 41, Ugandan poet, traffic collision.
