= Max Glatt =

German British psychiatrist (1912–2002)

- Glatt, c. 1990
- Born: 26 January 1912; Berlin, Germany
- Died: 14 May 2002 (aged 90); London, United Kingdom
- Education: University of Leipzig
- Occupations: Psychiatrist; addiction expert; editor
- Organizations: Warlingham Park Hospital; British Journal of Addiction; Medical Council on Alcohol

Max Meier Glatt (26 January 1912 – 14 May 2002) was a German British psychiatrist and addiction expert. A survivor of the Dachau concentration camp, he went on to become a prominent expert in the treatment of addiction in the United Kingdom. He was one of the pioneers in the treatment of people with an addictive personality trait.

== Early life ==
Born in Berlin, because of his Jewish origins, Glatt had to overcome considerable resistance in order to be able to study under the Nazi regime. Nevertheless, he received his doctorate as a neurologist from the University of Leipzig in 1936. When he tried to flee to the Netherlands after the November pogrom in 1938, he was arrested at the border and sent to the Dachau concentration camp. After his release from the Dachau concentration camp, he emigrated to Great Britain. After the start of the Second World War, he was deported as an enemy alien first to the Isle of Man and then on a prison ship to Australia. In 1942 he returned to Britain. There he learnt that his parents had been deported to Estonia, where they were later murdered in a concentration camp. Only he and his sister, who managed to escape to Holland, survived the Holocaust.

== Addiction treatment pioneer ==
From 1951, Glatt worked as a doctor and psychotherapist in various London clinics, including Warlingham Park Hospital. He made significant breakthroughs in the development of the "Jellinek curve" of alcoholic addiction.

Glatt treated HM Prison Wormwood Scrubs' addicts, and such was the success of his programmes that the prison's football team was nicknamed the "Glatt Dynamos".

Glatt was appointed as a consultant in 1958, and set up an alcohol dependency unit in a female ward in St Bernard's Hospital, Hanwell. His approach of creating a "therapeutic community" with a 12-week inpatient stay to help patients come to terms with their problems and explore new methods of living in the future without their addiction was found to be a great success. In 1982 this facility was moved and became a drug and alcohol dependence unit; it moved again in 2000. It is currently run by the Central North West London Mental Health NHS Trust Substance Misuses Service.

He was one of the scientists who early on postulated that alcohol addiction was a disease and lobbied the World Health Organization to this end. Glatt also firmly opposed the criminalization of drug addiction.

In 1962, Glatt took over as editor of the British Journal of Addiction, a position he held for fifteen years. He was also a vice-president of the Medical Council on Alcohol.

== Personal life ==
Glatt was married to Gisella, also a Holocaust survivor; the couple had a son and several grandchildren. He was described as deeply religious, modest and gentle with a sense of humour. He ran a weekly group at Florence Nightingale Hospital after retirement until he suffered a fall.

Glatt died on 14 May 2002 at age 90.

== Honours ==
Glatt was elected distinguished fellow of the Society for the Study of Addiction. The therapeutic community he founded is now known as the "Max Glatt Unit".

== Publications (selection) ==
- Glatt, Max Meier (1967). The Drug Scene in Britain - Journey Into Loneliness.
- Glatt, M.M. (1973). A Guide to Addiction and Its Treatment. Springer Netherlands. ISBN 9401158991.
- Glatt, Max Meier (1975). Alcoholism - A Social Disease. Teach Yourself Books. ISBN 0340195037.
- Glatt, Max Meier (1974). The Alcoholic and the Help He Needs. Taplinger. ISBN 9780800801656.
- Glatt, M.M. (1977). Drug Dependence - Current Problems and. Springer Netherlands. ISBN 9789401161480.
- Glatt, M. M.; Marks, J., eds. (1982). The Dependence Phenomenon. Dordrecht: Springer. doi:10.1007/978-94-011-7457-2. ISBN 978-94-011-7459-6.
