= Dziurzynski =

Dziurzynski or Dziurzyński (feminine: Dziurzyńska; plural: Dziurzyńscy) is a Polish surname. Notable people with this surname include:

- David Dziurzynski (born 1989), Canadian ice hockey player
- Zofia Dziurzyńska-Rosińska (1896–1979), Polish painter
