= Death of Ludwig van Beethoven =

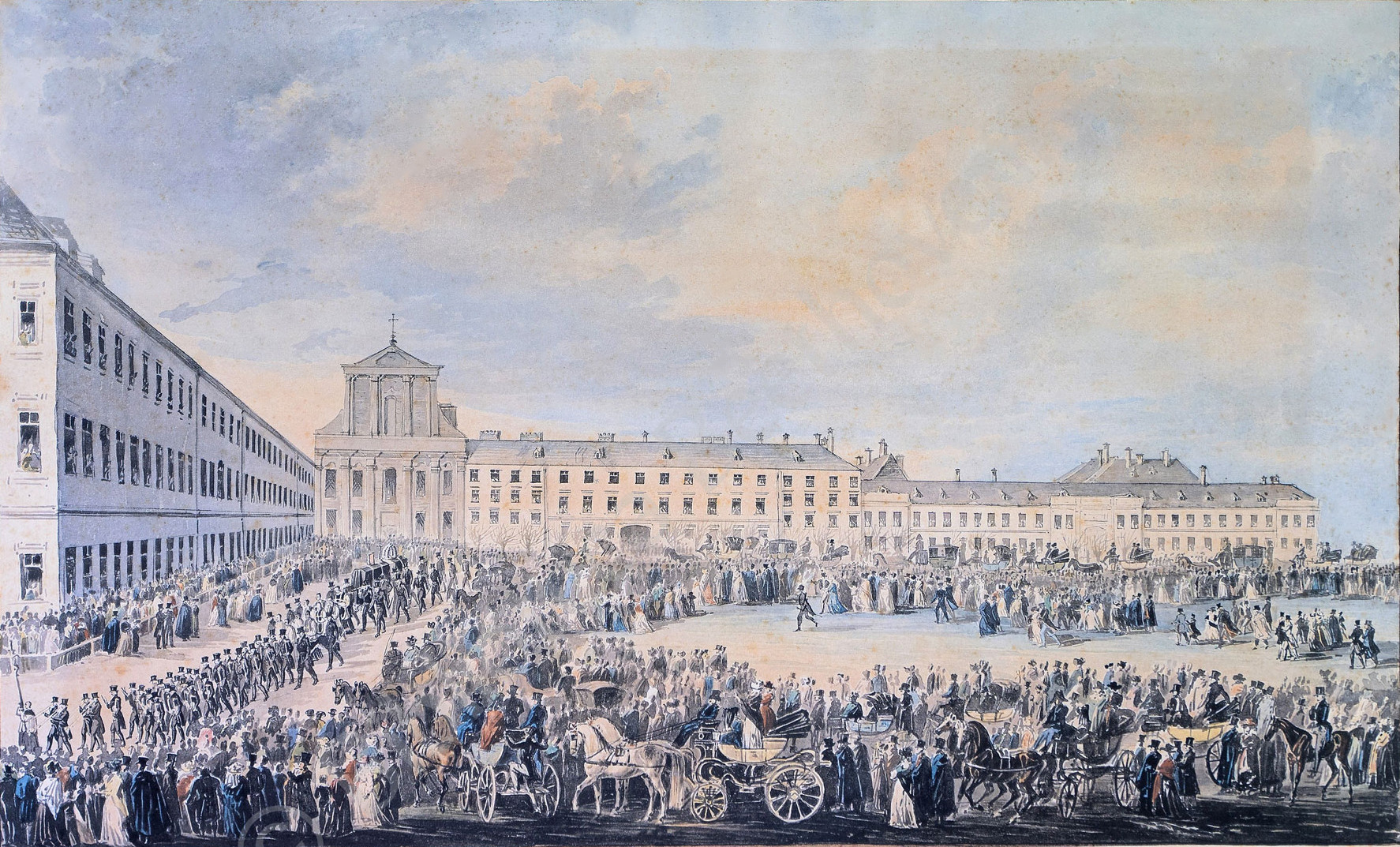
Beethoven's funeral as depicted by Franz Xaver Stöber (1795–1858)

The German composer Ludwig van Beethoven died in his apartment in the Schwarzspanierhaus, Vienna, on 26 March 1827 at the age of 56, following a prolonged illness. His death was witnessed by his sister-in-law, possibly by his secretary Karl Holz, and by his close friend Anselm Hüttenbrenner, who provided a vivid description of the event. Beethoven's funeral was held three days later, and the procession was witnessed by a large crowd. He was originally buried in the cemetery at Währing, although his remains were moved in 1888 to the Vienna Central Cemetery.

Hüttenbrenner's account has been used to ascribe motivations of resistance and anger to Beethoven in his final moments. Beethoven's last words and the exact cause of his death have also been the subject of some historical debate, with causes such as liver disease and lead poisoning being theories.

== Final days and illness ==
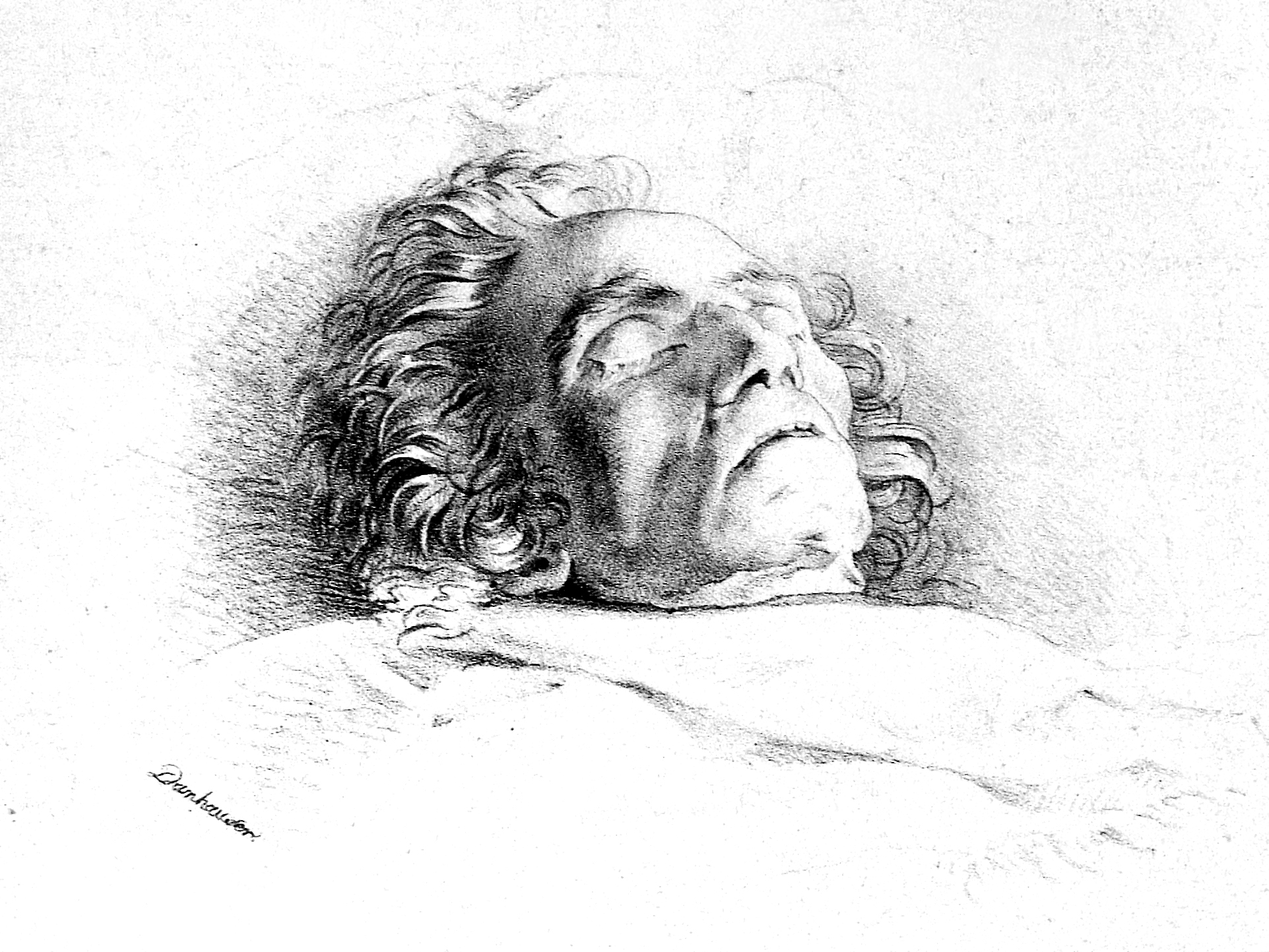
Beethoven on his deathbed depicted in a Josef Danhauser sketch

Beethoven suffered declining health throughout the last years of his life, including the so-called "Late period" when he produced some of his most admired work. The last work he was able to complete was the substitute final movement of the String Quartet No. 13, Op. 130, composed to replace the difficult Große Fuge, which was published separately as Opus 133. Shortly thereafter, in late 1826, illness struck again, with episodes of vomiting and diarrhea that nearly ended his life.

As it became apparent that Beethoven would not recover, his friends gathered to help and to pay their final respects. Beethoven's doctors conducted four minor operations to relieve ascites (abdominal swelling), of which the first resulted in infection, the others not. On 24 March he was given his last rites, and on 26 March he slipped into unconsciousness and died early that evening. While others, including Beethoven's brother Johann, Karl Holz and some friends were probably in the house, Hüttenbrenner reports in his account given in 1860, that only he and Beethoven's sister-in-law were present in the room at the time of death.

=== Final words ===
At this startling, awful peal of thunder, the dying man suddenly raised his head from Hüttenbrenner's arm, stretched out his own right arm majestically—like a general giving orders to an army. This was but for an instant; the arm sunk back; he fell back; Beethoven was dead.

— Thayer's summary of Beethoven's death

Beethoven's last recorded words were "Pity, pity—too late!", as he was told of a gift of twelve bottles of wine from his publisher, Schott Music. One common belief was that his last words were "Plaudite, amici, comedia finita est" ("Applaud, friends, the comedy is over"), the typical conclusion to performances of Italian Commedia dell'arte; this was specifically denied by Hüttenbrenner in 1860. Another invention is that his last words were, "I shall hear in heaven," apropos his deafness.

Beethoven's biographer Alexander Wheelock Thayer, in his notebook, recorded Hüttenbrenner's account of Beethoven's death. Hüttenbrenner's eyewitness report is sometimes recast to imply that Beethoven "shook his fist at the heavens" in the moment before death. As any imputations about Beethoven's emotional state are impossible to verify, they tend to be glossed over or ignored as irrelevant by modern scholars.

== Autopsy and post-mortem findings ==
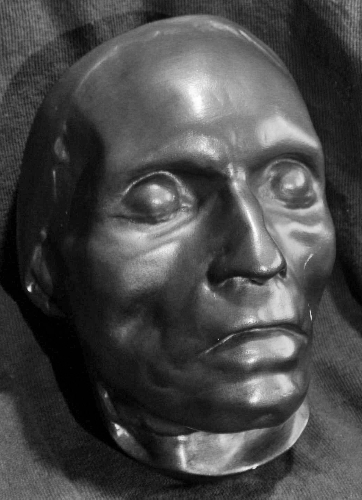
Death mask of Beethoven by Josef Danhauser

An autopsy was performed on 27 March 1827 by Dr. Johann Wagner. While it is unclear who ordered the autopsy, a specific request by Beethoven in his Heiligenstadt Testament may have played a role in the decision. The autopsy revealed a severely cirrhotic and shrunken liver, of which ascites is a common consequence. Scholars disagree over whether Beethoven's liver damage was the result of heavy alcohol consumption, hepatic infection, or both. Hepatitis B and C are causes of cirrhosis, but they spread from contact with contaminated body fluids and were extremely rare in Beethoven's day. Hepatitis A on the other hand can be contracted from food and water that were not handled properly and was very common in the 19th century, although it does not cause liver cirrhosis or permanent organ damage.

Heavy metal contamination is thought to be a contributing factor in Beethoven's death as these were commonly used in medicines of the time. It has also been theorized that he consumed large amounts of lead from illegally fortified wine. Putting sugar of lead into wine was a very common practice to sweeten cheap wines, and despite being outlawed in most European countries during the 18th century, the prohibition was difficult to enforce and production of lead-fortified wine (which originated in Roman times) continued unabated. There is no indication Beethoven had syphilis beyond a mercury treatment prescribed to him around 1815, but these were used for various other ailments as well.

The autopsy indicated damage to his aural nerves as well as hardening of their accompanying arteries, although the latter appears to be consistent with natural aging and not inflammatory damage from syphilis. Beethoven's brain was described as possessing "exaggerated folds", an excess of fluid in the skull, and some thickening of the membranes inside the left ventricle. Scholars believe he may have had a degree of cerebral atrophy, although he showed no sign of cognitive impairment to the end. The skull was described as "possessing unusual thickness".

Beethoven's kidneys had calcareous growths in them, indicating that he was likely developing renal papillary necrosis (RPN). Diabetes is also a cause of RPN, and scholars have not ruled out the possibility that the composer had diabetes mellitus. His spleen was swollen to twice the normal size and he had portal hypertension, both consistent with end-stage liver failure. He also appears to have had severe pancreatitis, as the doctors described his pancreas as "shrunken and fibrous", with the exit duct being very thin and narrowed. Large amounts of reddish fluid had accumulated in Beethoven's abdomen, probably from spontaneous bacterial infections mixed with some blood. This was likely a result of draining fluid from his abdomen in his last days, a practice that frequently caused infection and often death of the patient in a time before antibiotics and bacterial pathology were known.

In the days immediately preceding and following his death, a number of people, including Anton Schindler and Ferdinand Hiller, cut locks of hair from Beethoven's head. Most of Hiller's lock is now in the Center for Beethoven Studies at San Jose State University. One of Beethoven's friends incorrectly thought that "strangers had cut all of his hair off"; in fact, the apparent lack of hair was due to a cloth cap that covered most of the hair while the body was lying in state.

On 28 March 1827, castings for a death mask were taken. The body was washed, clothed and placed in an oaken coffin, with the head given a wreath of white roses. Beethoven's hands held a wax cross and a lily.

In 1970, Dr. John Spencer Madden, editor of the journal Alcohol and Alcoholism, wrote a post-mortem analysis. This post-mortem became well known by being referenced by a short comical essay by the humorist Alan Coren entitled "Careful, Mr. Beethoven, that was your fifth!"

== Funeral and burial ==
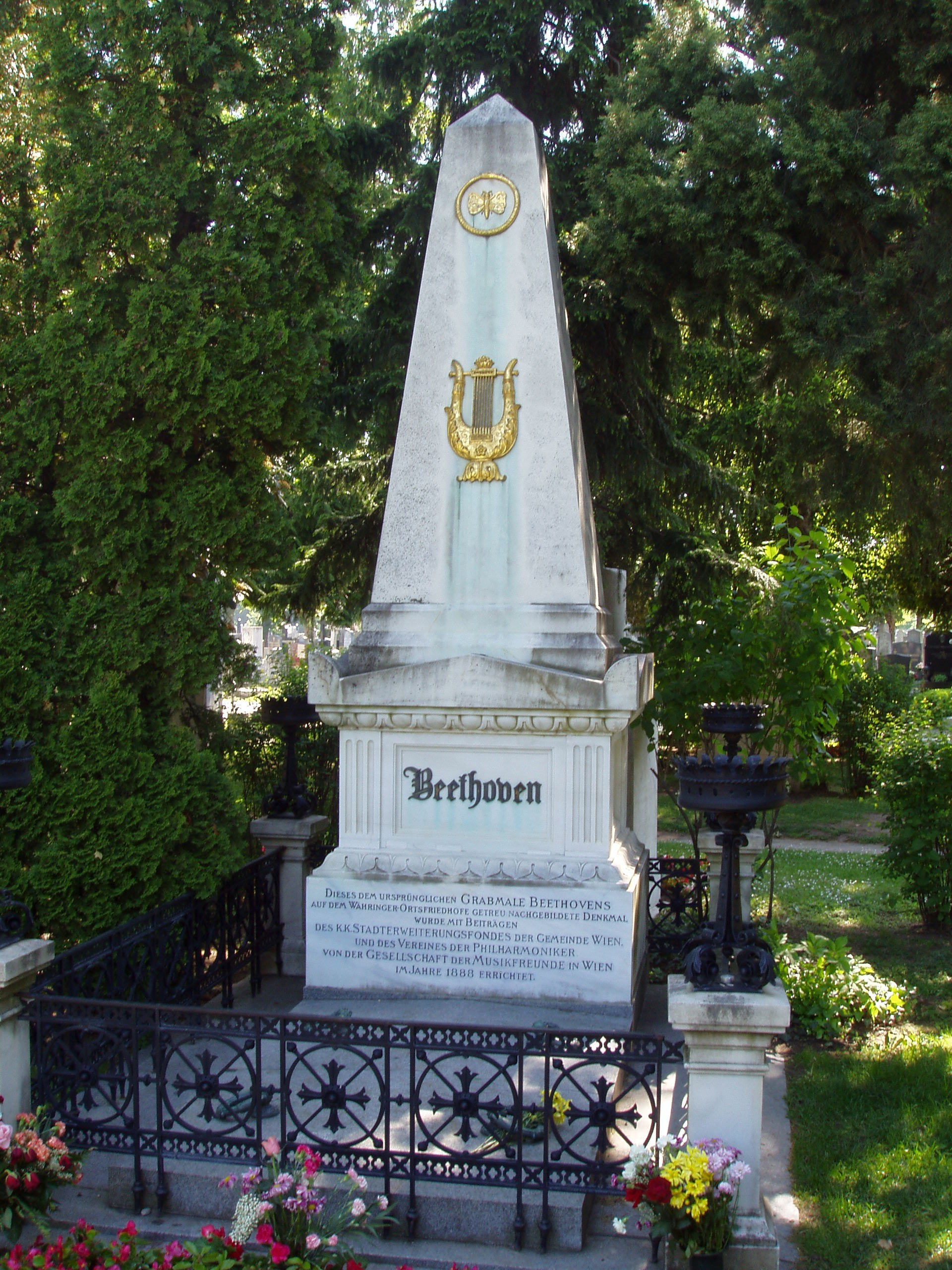
Beethoven's grave

The funeral was held on 29 March 1827 at the parish church in Alsergrund, and he was buried in the Währing cemetery, northwest of Vienna. Many thousands of citizens lined the streets for the funeral procession. As with all crowds, estimates vary, with witnesses reporting anywhere from 10,000 to 30,000 onlookers. Theaters were closed, and many notable artists participated in the funeral procession as pallbearers or torch bearers, including Johann Nepomuk Hummel, Franz Grillparzer, who wrote a eulogy, Carl Czerny, Klemens von Metternich and Franz Schubert. At a memorial mass in a Vienna church on 3 April, Mozart's Requiem was sung with an additional Libera me by Ignaz von Seyfried.

In the days following the funeral, one of the grave-diggers was reportedly offered a substantial sum of money to remove the head from the grave. As a result, Beethoven's friends had a watch put on the grave.

In 1863 Beethoven's body (and also that of Schubert, who was buried nearby) was exhumed, studied and reburied, in proceedings paid for by the Gesellschaft der Musikfreunde. At that time, fragments from the back of his skull, which had been separated during the autopsy, were acquired by the Austrian doctor Romeo Seligmann, which are also now in the Center for Beethoven Studies. His remains were moved in 1888 to the Vienna Central Cemetery.

== Theories ==
There is dispute about the cause of Beethoven's death; alcoholic cirrhosis, syphilis, infectious hepatitis, lead poisoning, sarcoidosis, and Whipple's disease have all been proposed. In 2008 the Austrian pathologist Christian Reiter asserted that Beethoven's doctor, Andreas Ignaz Wawruch, accidentally killed him by giving him an overdose of a lead-based cure. According to Reiter, Wawruch used the cure to alleviate fluid in the abdomen; the lead penetrated Beethoven's liver and killed him. Reiter's hypothesis, however, is at odds with Wawruch's written instruction "that the wound was kept dry all the time". Furthermore, human hair is a poor biomarker for lead contamination, and Reiter's hypothesis must be considered dubious as long as proper scholarly documentation remains unpublished.

In 2010, Dr. Andrew C. Todd tested two skull fragments purportedly to have been stolen during Beethoven’s first exhumation in 1863 for lead, and determined that the concentration of lead was no greater than would be expected for a normal man of 56 at that time. In 2012, these skull fragments were analyzed independently by a panel of five forensic anthropologists, including Dr. Tim White, Dr. Alison Galloway, Dr. Mark Griffin, Dr. P. Willey and Dr. Eric Bartelink. All five concluded that two of the larger fragments, erroneously identified in 1986 by the Viennese physicians Hans Bankl and Hans Jesserer as fragments of a human parietal, were fragments of a human frontal bone. As these fragments lacked Beethoven’s diagnostic craniotomy cut from his autopsy, it was unanimously agreed that the frontal bone fragments could not have originated from Beethoven. The portion of Beethoven’s frontal bone corresponding to the cranial fragments then under examination were furthermore described in considerable detail, and measured three times, during Beethoven’s second exhumation in 1888, twenty-five years after their purported theft in 1863. The authenticity status of the third large cranial element, the squamous of a human occipital, was not conclusively arrived at by this panel of forensic anthropologists. However, the squamous of Beethoven’s occipital is also listed among the cranial elements recovered during Beethoven’s second exhumation in 1888, and salient features of the squamous of Beethoven’s occipital (e.g. the curvature of the squamous on the horizontal plane; the overhang of the occipital) are likewise described in this same 1888 exhumation report.

Among lines of evidence considered by some to be consistent with lead poisoning, the finding of shrunken cochlear nerves at his autopsy is consistent with axonal degeneration due to heavy metals such as lead. Chronic low-level lead exposure causes a slowly progressive hearing loss with sensory and autonomic findings, rather than the classic wrist drop due to motor neuropathy from sub-acute poisoning.

In March of 2023, genomic analyses of a high-coverage genome sequenced from a lock of hair which the study’s authors considered “almost certainly authentic” revealed several genetic risk factors for liver disease, as well as evidence for an infection with hepatitis B virus. Beethoven was homozygous for the most robustly associated common risk genotype for the full spectrum of progressive liver disease, at rs738409 in the PNPLA3 gene, and was compound heterozygous for two type-1 classical hereditary hemochromatosis mutations, rs1799945 and rs1800562, in the HFE gene. Beethoven’s polygenic score for cirrhosis was in agreement with these findings, placing him in the 96th polygenic risk percentile, and conferring an odds ratio similar in effect-size to that conferred by his PNPLA3 risk genotype. While retrospective cohort analyses performed in that study, using men from the UK BioBank who shared Beethoven’s genetic risk factors, did not reveal a high prevalence of progressive liver disease or cirrhosis among those men in the general population, a substantial interaction effect was observed among those men who had also been diagnosed with an alcohol use disorder, with approximately 20% of these men having a primary or secondary diagnosis of some form of cirrhosis at the time they were recruited as UK BioBank participants (aged 40 to 69, average 56.74 for men).

The authors concluded that, had Beethoven’s alcohol consumption been sufficiently heavy over a long enough period of time, its interaction with his heritable risk factors may constitute a plausible causal explanation for his liver disease. The authors cautioned, however, that the extent of Beethoven’s alcohol consumption, and thus the extent of this harmful interaction, remain uncertain. The authors also concluded that, despite Beethoven being compound heterozygous for type-1 hereditary haemochromatosis, he remained at a low overall risk for an iron overload disorder, though his HFE risk diplotype may have exerted an additional harmful effect on his liver health.

In the same 2023 genomic study, a 1.26-fold coverage hepatitis B virus genome was sequenced using a targeted hybridization capture technique, and was assigned to the D2 subgenotype. Only the Stumpff Lock, cut after Beethoven’s death and plausibly representing a growth interval many months before his death, was positive for HBV. The authors concluded that Beethoven had an ongoing HBV infection at the time those hairs were forming, estimated to have been most likely in ca. 1826. Owing to the limited sensitivity of the HBV analyses, the authors could not determine the nature, period of onset, or origin of Beethoven’s HBV infection, but suggest that a chronic infection was nonetheless more probable than an acute infection. They concluded that a lifelong infection would have been a strong driver of liver disease, no doubt exacerbated by alcohol consumption and genetic risk, while an infection later in life would have been of debatable relevance.

In the same 2023 study, the Hiller Lock, elsewhere referred to as the Guevara Lock, was revealed to have originated from a woman, assigned to the K1a1b1a mitochondrial haplogroup, common among individuals of Ashkenazi Jewish matrilineal ancestry. The authors reported the lowest possible final mitochondrial contamination estimate of 0–2% for the Hiller Lock, using the algorithm Schmutzi. The study authors therefore concluded that the results of toxicological analyses of the Hiller Lock, which had been taken to conclude that plumbism caused or contributed to Beethoven’s health complaints, and that he had neither been administered opiates during the course of his final illness, nor mercury for a hypothesized infection with syphilis, no longer applied to Beethoven.

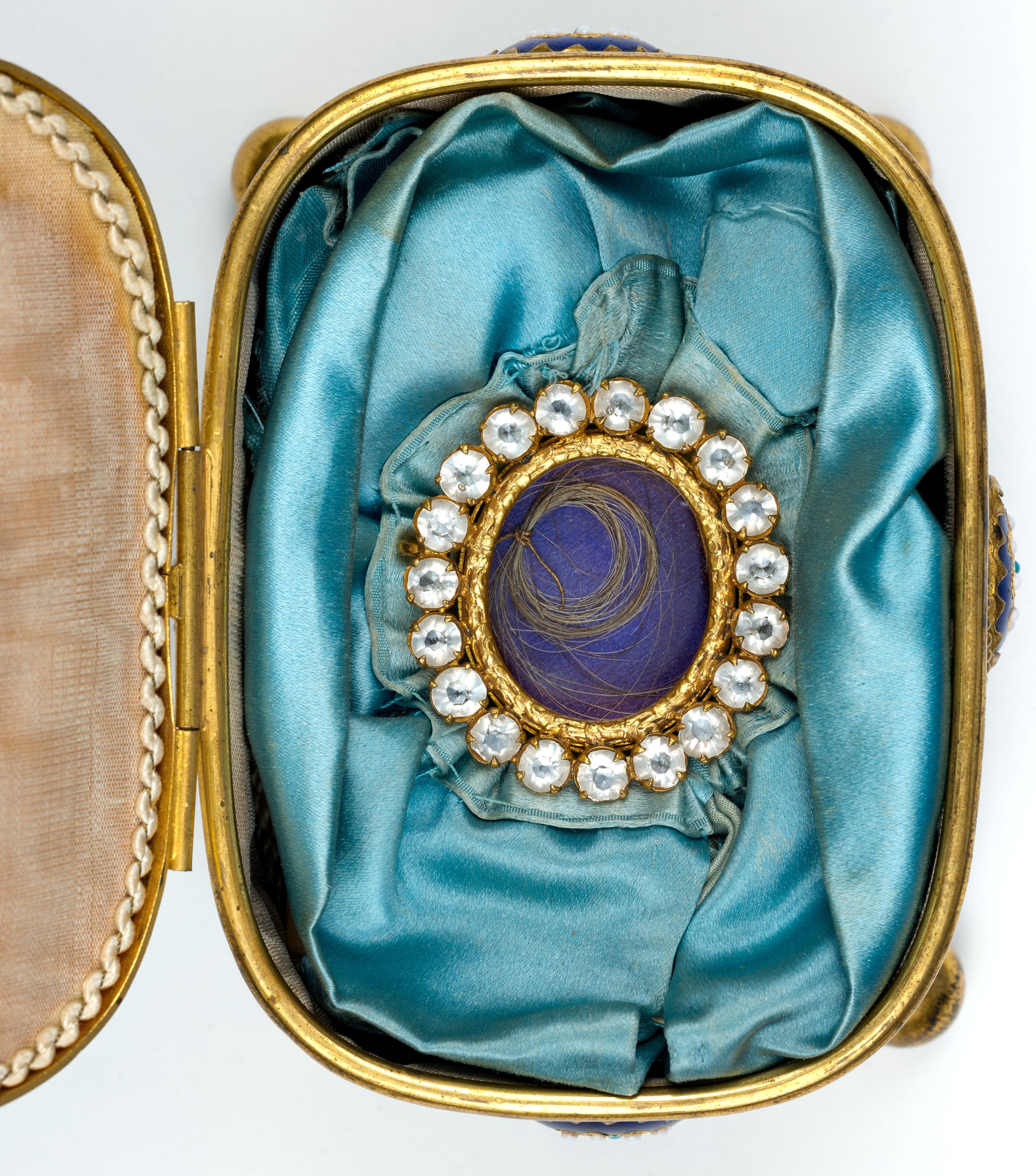
A lock of Beethoven's hair mounted in a jewel-encrusted case with a glass covering
