= Free Academy =

Free Academy may refer to:

- Bellows Free Academy, Fairfax, public K-12 school located in Fairfax, Vermont
- Bellows Free Academy, St. Albans, public high school located in St. Albans, Vermont
- Elmira Free Academy, public high school located in Elmira, New York from 1859–2014
- Newburgh Free Academy, public high school located in Newburgh, New York
- Norwich Free Academy, public high school located in Norwich, Connecticut
- Rome Free Academy, public high school located in Rome, New York
- Utica Free Academy, public high school located in Utica, New York from 1840–1990
- Vrije Academie voor Beeldende Kunsten (Free Academy of Visual Art), The Hague, The Netherlands
- The New York Free Academy, established in 1847, the original name of the City College of New York
