= Marshall Dillon =

Marshall Dillon may refer to:

- Matt Dillon (Gunsmoke), a U.S. Marshal in the TV series Gunsmoke
- Marshall Dillon (cricketer), Australian cricketer
