= Gary Wand =

Gary S. Wand is an American physician and an Alfredo Rivière and Norma Rodriguez de Rivière professor who specializes in endocrinology and metabolism. He is a Johns Hopkins School of Medicine laboratory director, focusing on neuropsychoendocrinology. He is also Director of the Johns Hopkins School of Medicine Fellowship Program.

He holds an M.D. from the George Washington University School of Medicine (1980). After post-doctoral training in endocrinology and metabolism at the Johns Hopkins University School of Medicine, he became a fellow in the peptide laboratories of JHU’s Department of Neuroscience, and subsequently joined the JHU faculty.

Wand is a recipient of the National Institutes of Health Merit Award. He is a member of the Endocrine Society, Pituitary Society and the American College of Neuropsychopharmacology. In 2008 he wrote a research paper called The influence of stress on the transition from drug use to addiction which was published by the National Institutes of Health in one of their journals. A year later he collaborated with M Uhart to an article called Stress, alcohol and drug interaction: An update of human research which was published by Addiction Biology.

== Other publications ==
- Wand G, Oswald L, McCaul, ME, Wong, DF, Johnson E, Zhou Y, Kuwabara, H, Kumar, A. (2007). "Association of amphetamine-induced striatal dopamine release and cortisol responses to psychological stress". Neuropsychopharmacology. 32 (11): 2310–20. doi:10.1038/sj.npp.1301373. PMID 17342167. S2CID 1463890.
- Yang, X, Wang, S, Rice K, Munro C, Wand, G. (2008). A Stress model that increases alcohol preference in a non-alcohol preferring mouse line. Vol. 32. Alcohol Clin Exp Res. pp. 840–52.
- Kharlip, J, Salvatori, R, Yenokyan, G, Wand, G. (2009). "Relapse of hyperprolactinemia following withdrawal of long-term cabergoline therapy". The Journal of Clinical Endocrinology and Metabolism. 94 (7): 2428–36. doi:10.1210/jc.2008-2103. PMC 2708963. PMID 19336508.
- Mangold D, Wand G, Javors, M, Mintz J. (2010). "Acculturation, childhood trauma and the cortisol awakening response in Mexican American adults". Hormones and Behavior. 58 (4): 637–46. doi:10.1016/j.yhbeh.2010.06.010. PMC 2940704. PMID 20600049.
- Vaughan TB, Blevins, L, Vaphiades MS, Wand G. (2010). "Multimodal Approach to the Diagnosis of Sella and ParaSellar Lesions". Schmidek & Sweet's Operative Neurosurgical Techniques: Indications, Methods, and Results (6 ed.).
- Wand, G. (2010). "Melatonin and the Pineal Gland". DeGroot and Jameson's Endocrinology (4 ed.). Philadelphia, Pennsylvania: W.B. Saunders Company.
