= Michelini =

Michelini is an Italian surname, derived from the given name Michele. Notable people with the surname include:

- Alberto Michelini (born 1941), Italian journalist and politician
- Arturo Michelini (1909–1969), Italian politician
- Danilo Michelini (1917–1983), Italian footballer
- Famiano Michelini (1604–1665), Italian mathematician
- Flavien Michelini (born 1986), French footballer
- Gian Carlo Michelini (1935–2026), Italian-Taiwanese Roman Catholic priest
- Giovanni Battista Michelini (1604–1655), Italian painter
- Giulia Michelini (born 1985), Italian actress
- Ottavio Michelini (1906–1979), Italian Roman Catholic priest
- Rafael Michelini (born 1958), Uruguayan politician
- Stéphanie Michelini, French actress
- Zelmar Michelini (1924–1976), Uruguayan reporter and politician
