= Rosinski =

Rosinski or Rosiński (feminine: Rosińska; plural: Rosińscy) is a Polish surname. Notable people with this surname include:

- Bill Rosinski, American sportscaster
- Grzegorz Rosiński (born 1941), Polish comic book artist
- Tomasz Rosiński (born 1984), Polish handball player
- Vladimir Rosinski, musician
- Wojciech Rosiński (born 1955), Polish basketball player
- Zofia Dziurzyńska-Rosińska (1896–1979), Polish painter

== See also ==
- Rosinsky
