= Jacob Zekveld =

Dutch artist (1945–2002)

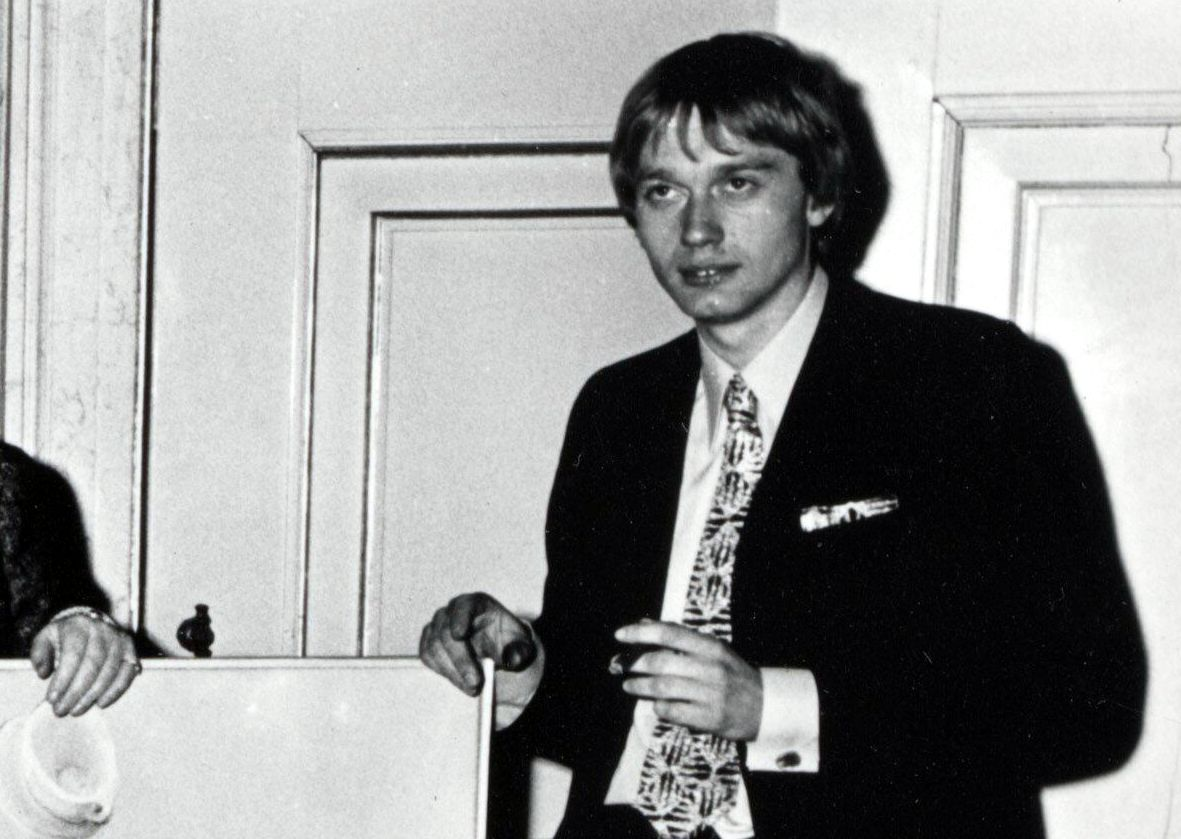
Jacob Zekveld at the Royal Subsidy Award in 1968

Jacob Zekveld (1945–2002) was a Dutch sculptor, graphic artist, painter, designer, and installation artist.

He studied at the Free Academy in The Hague.

The topics of Zekveld were focused on people, animals and fairytale scenes. His style attribute belongs to the nouvelle figuration. From Zekveld has a number of awards and grants awarded including a scholarship and the Royal Subsidy for Painting in 1968, and in 1969.

Some of his works are:

- Dans mes yeux
- Jacob in Spiegelland
- The undertakers and the angry one

== Exhibitions and prizes ==
- Royal Subsidy for Painting, 1967
- Royal Subsidy for Painting, 1968
- Europe Prize for Painting of the city of Ostend silver medal, 1971
- Work Exhibition Visual Arts, 1989
