= List of listed buildings in Kirkurd, Scottish Borders =

This is a list of listed buildings in the parish of Kirkurd in the Scottish Borders, Scotland.

== List ==
Name	Location	Date Listed	Grid Ref. (Note: Sometimes known as OSGB36, the grid reference (where provided) is based on the British national grid reference system used by the Ordnance Survey. • "Guide to National Grid". Ordnance Survey. • "Get-a-map". Ordnance Survey.)	Geo-coordinates	Notes	LB Number (Note: Historic Environment Scotland assign a unique alphanumeric identifier to each designated site in Scotland, for listed buildings this always begins with "LB", for example "LB12345".)	Image
Castlecraig				55°41′03″N 3°22′29″W	Category B	13681	Upload Photo
Kirkurd Parish Church				55°41′03″N 3°23′20″W	Category B	8328	Upload Photo
Stables, Netherurd				55°41′17″N 3°24′13″W	Category B	8341	Upload Photo
The Whalebone Arch, Netherurd				55°41′05″N 3°24′13″W	Category B	8342	Upload Photo
Netherurd House				55°41′16″N 3°24′22″W	Category B	8340	Upload Photo
Session Or Watchhouse At Entrance Gate				55°41′04″N 3°23′20″W	Category B	8329	Upload Photo
Gibson-Carmichael Vault And Gate				55°41′03″N 3°23′21″W	Category B	8330	Upload Photo
Sundial, On Plateau In Front Of Castlecraig				55°41′03″N 3°22′28″W	Category B	8336	Upload Photo
Kirkurd War Memorial				55°41′22″N 3°23′19″W	Category B	8339	Upload Photo
Kirkurd Old Church				55°40′58″N 3°22′22″W	Category B	8335	Upload Photo
West Mains Stable, Castlecraig				55°41′13″N 3°23′11″W	Category B	8338	Upload Photo
Castlecraig, Entrance Gates And Twin Lodges				55°41′11″N 3°22′15″W	Category B	8337	Upload Photo

== Key ==
The scheme for classifying buildings in Scotland is:

- Category A: "buildings of national or international importance, either architectural or historic; or fine, little-altered examples of some particular period, style or building type."
- Category B: "buildings of regional or more than local importance; or major examples of some particular period, style or building type, which may have been altered."
- Category C: "buildings of local importance; lesser examples of any period, style, or building type, as originally constructed or moderately altered; and simple traditional buildings which group well with other listed buildings."

In March 2016 there were 47,288 listed buildings in Scotland. Of these, 8% were Category A, and 50% were Category B, with the remaining 42% being Category C.
