= Addiction Biology =

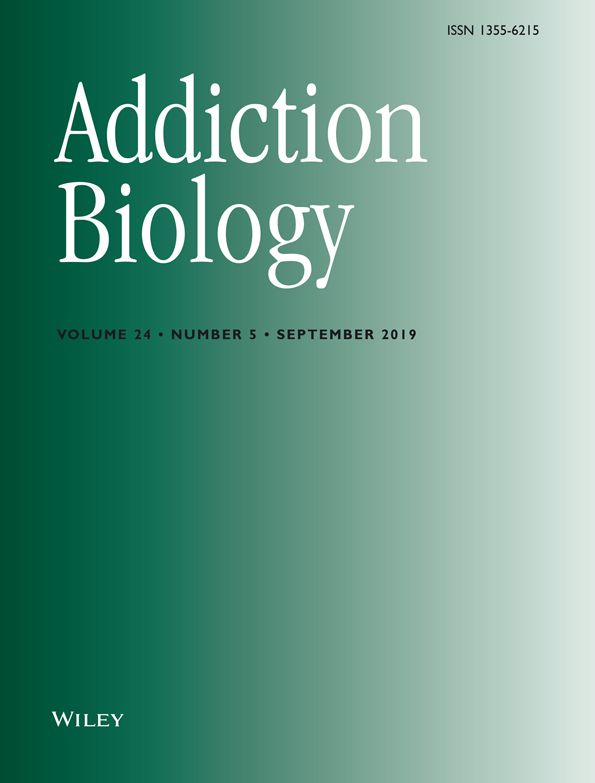
- Discipline: Addiction
- Language: English
- Edited by: Rainer Spanagel

Publication details
- History: 1996–present
- Publisher: Wiley-Blackwell
- Frequency: Quarterly
- Impact factor: 4.280 (2020)

Standard abbreviations
- ISO 4: Addctn. Biol.
- NLM: Addict Biol

Indexing
- CODEN: ADBIFN
- ISSN: 1355-6215 (print); 1369-1600 (web)
- LCCN: 34753728

Links
- Journal homepage; Online access; Online archive

Addiction Biology is a quarterly peer-reviewed scientific journal covering research on substance abuse. It is one of two journals published on behalf of the Society for the Study of Addiction to Alcohol and other Drugs. The major focus of Addiction Biology is on neuroscience contributions from animal experimentation and clinical point of views. The editor-in-chief is Rainer Spanagel (Heidelberg University). According to the Journal Citation Reports, the journal has a 2020 impact factor of 4.280.
