= Rosinsky =

Rosinsky or Rosinský (Slovak feminine: Rosinská) is a surname. Notable people with this surname include:

- Ján Rosinský (born 1952), Slovak football player and manager
- Sofia Rosinsky (born 2006), American actress
- Will Rosinsky (born 1984), American boxer and firefighter

== See also ==
- Rosinski
