= Merz Pharma =

Pharmaceutical company in Germany

Merz Pharma GmbH & Co. KGaA.
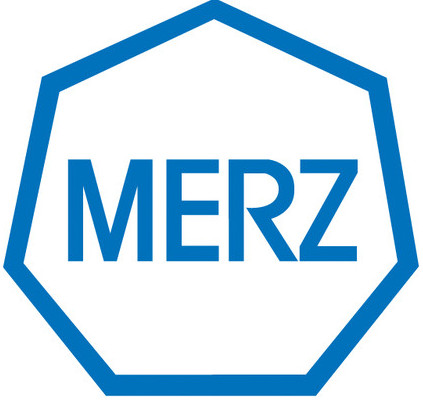
- Type: Private
- Industry: Pharmaceuticals
- Founded: 9 March 1908
- Founder: Friedrich Merz
- Headquarters: Frankfurt am Main, Germany
- Key people: Philip Burchard; Chief Executive Officer; Hans-Jörg Bergler; Chief Operating Officer
- Revenue: EUR 1.3434 billion (2021/22)
- Number of employees: 3,730 (2021/22)
- Website: www.merz.com

Merz Pharma GmbH & Co. KGaA (also Merz Pharma KGaA or Merz) is an internationally active family-owned company, headquartered in Frankfurt am Main, Germany. Merz is the parent company of independent businesses in the fields of aesthetic medicine, therapeutic medicine (including for neurological movement disorders), and wellness and beauty products with its brands Tetesept and Merz Spezial.

== History ==
=== Early history ===
In 1908, the trained pharmacist and chemist Friedrich Merz set up his own pharmaceutical production in Frankfurt am Main. At the time of its foundation, Merz already held a patent and a utility model protection. The company subsequently expanded and one year later moved to a former cigarette factory, where the company's headquarters have been located since. In the beginning, Merz developed and produced the first contraceptive for birth control, as well as menthol refreshment cigarettes, and ointments against scaly skin. During the Second World War, Allied air raids on Frankfurt destroyed about 70% of the buildings. However, Merz had outsourced duplicates of its production machinery to Reinheim (Darmstadt) and was thus able to quickly rebuild production after the end of the war.

=== Product Expansion ===
In 1953, Merz entered the cosmetics business with the first anti-wrinkle product (Placentubex). From the 1960s onwards, Merz developed dragées for beauty care. Merz Spezial Dragees came into the market in 1964 and were promoted in the 1970s and 1980s under the slogan "Natural beauty comes from within". In the 1970s, the company also expanded its products for medical prescription, for example for the treatment of Parkinson's disease and lowering elevated blood lipids. In 2002, Merz developed Memantine, the world's first active ingredient for the treatment of moderate to severe Alzheimer's dementia. In 2005, Merz brought a new generation of botulinum toxins into the market. At that time, the preparation was the only botulinum toxin type A (BoNT/A) without complexing foreign proteins and thus reduced the risk of antibody-mediated therapy failure.

=== Change of Managing Director ===
In 2012, the previous managing director and grandson of the company founder, Jochen Hückmann, retired from the business and handed over the management to Burchard. Hückmann had held the management since the early 1970s. During this time, the company continued to expand its position internationally among other things with the development of the active ingredient Memantine.

=== Medical technology in the field of aesthetics ===
The patent for Memantine expired in Germany in 2012. Until then, it was the only approved drug against moderate and severe forms of dementia. In the USA, the drug still had three years of patent protection. In order not to suffer a drop in sales after the patent expired, the expansion of the aesthetic and special neurology divisions was pushed ahead. Three years earlier, Merz had acquired the US company Bioform Medical for EUR 190 million. Bioform specialised in the production of fillers for aesthetic medicine.

This was followed in 2013 by the purchase of the Swiss company Neocutis, whose aesthetic dermatology products were mainly in the USA by physicians. In the same year Merz took over the Swiss company Anteis, which also produced fillers for aesthetic medicine. Merz entered the non-invasive facelift medical device business in 2014 with the acquisition of US company Ulthera for a sum close to $600 million. In 2015 Merz launched a subsidiary in Thailand.

=== Creation of independent businesses ===
Merz established a new corporate structure in late 2019. This organisational structure consists of three independently operating business divisions: Merz Aesthetics, Merz Therapeutics and Merz Consumer Care. In addition, the global Merz Aesthetics headquarters moved from Frankfurt to Raleigh, North Carolina. In early 2020, the company's business collapsed for three months as a result of the initial impact of the COVID-19 pandemic. Cosmetic and medical procedures were cancelled due to fear of contracting the virus and the scarcity of personal protective equipment such as gloves.

It was announced at the beginning of 2023 that Merz would invest around EUR 120 million in the Reinheim site and that production at the site between the old town and the Gersprenzauen meadows would be phased out.

== Company Structure ==
The company was founded by Friedrich Merz and is still family-owned. The management consists of Philip Burchard and Hans-Jörg Bergler.

Merz Pharma GmbH & Co. KGaA is the parent company of the Merz Group. Since the 2020/21 financial year, the group has controlled the three businesses Merz Aesthetics GmbH, Merz Therapeutics GmbH and Merz Consumer Care GmbH. The businesses are under the supervision of the Merz board of partners and the Merz supervisory board.

Merz employs around 3,730 people (2021/22) and generated a revenue of EUR 1.3434 billion in the 2021/22 fiscal year. A large part of the revenue is generated in the United States through the sale of special products for medical and aesthetic applications. Approximately 45% of sales are generated in the United States and almost 80% of all sales are generated outside of Germany.

=== Production sites and subsidiaries ===
Merz manages three production sites in Reinheim and Dessau (Germany) as well as in Racine County, Wisconsin (USA). In addition, the Group has its own sales offices in Brazil, France, Great Britain, Italy, Canada, South Korea, Mexico, Austria, Russia, Switzerland, Singapore, Spain, Taiwan, USA, Argentina, Australia, China, Hong Kong, India, Indonesia, Colombia, the Netherlands, Thailand, Malaysia, the Philippines, the United Arab Emirates and Vietnam. In addition, the group is active in around 70 countries through cooperations and distribution partnerships.

== Business activities ==
Since 2019, Merz has operated as three separate businesses: Merz Aesthetics, Merz Therapeutics, and Merz Consumer Care.

=== Merz Aesthetics ===
Merz Aesthetics develops and sells products in the field of aesthetic medicine. Its products include Xeomin, a botulinum toxin; Ultherapy PRIME, an ultrasound device; Radiesse, a biostimulator; and Belotero, an injectable dermal filler. It is the world's largest company dedicated exclusively to medical aesthetics.

Merz Aesthetics uses celebrities to market its products. In 2019, model Christie Brinkley promoted a non-invasive wrinkle-tightening procedure. Gwyneth Paltrow became the first brand ambassador for Merz Aesthetics in 2020. In 2023, Christina Aguilera promoted anti-wrinkle injections. The company is also primary sponsor for the North Carolina Courage. Merz announced its first three ambassadors for the Asia-Pacific region in 2022; Korean celebrities Lee Min-ho, Kim Ha-neul and Jeon So-min.

In November 2024, the FDA reprimanded Merz for a misleading Instagram ad featuring Nate Berkus promoting Xeomin. The agency criticized claims about the drug’s rapid effects and unique benefits, citing a lack of supporting data, and found the risk disclosures inadequate, making the ad misleading about Xeomin’s safety.

=== Merz Therapeutics ===
Merz Therapeutics develops and distributes products for the treatment of neurological movement disorders such as dystonia and spasticity. It has its headquarters in Frankfurt. Stefan König has been the managing director of this division since 2023. In 2024, Merz Therapeutics acquired Inbrija, an inhaled Parkinson’s disease medication, and Ampyra (also known as Fampyra in some markets), a sustained-release multiple sclerosis tablet for $185 million from Acorda Therapeutics, which had filed for bankruptcy.

=== Merz Consumer Care ===
Merz Consumer Care develops and distributes health, beauty, and wellness products. The main brands are tetesept and Merz Spezial. It has its headquarters in Frankfurt. Xenia Barth has been the managing director of this division since 2022. In May 2023, the name Merz Lifecare was introduced as the corporate brand instead of Merz Consumer Care. Merz Consumer Care GmbH has been retained as the company name.
