= Joseph Vandor =

Hungarian Roman Catholic priest (1909-1979)

Venerable José Vandor Puchner S.D.B.

Priest
- Born: 29 October 1909; Dorog, Komárom-Esztergom, Austro-Hungarian Empire
- Died: 8 October 1979 (aged 69); Santa Clara, Cuba
- Venerated in: Roman Catholic Church
- Attributes: Priest's attire

José Vandor Puchner (29 October 1909 – 8 October 1979) – born as József Wech – was a Hungarian Roman Catholic priest and a professed member from the Salesians of Don Bosco. He served in the missions on the island nation of Cuba where he was stationed from 1936 until his death but spent the bulk of that time in Santa Clara where he was since 1954.

His beatification cause commenced under Pope John Paul II in 2003 and he was titled thereafter as a Servant of God while Pope Francis titled him as Venerable in 2017 upon the recognition of the late priest's life of heroic virtue.

== Life ==
József Wech was born as József Wech in Dorog in the then-Austro-Hungarian Empire on 29 October 1909 to the German-native farmers Sebastian Wech and Maria Puchner. He received his baptism on 31 October and later received his Confirmation in Dorog on 23 May 1920.

He received his schooling from the Order of Friars Minor but in spring 1925 moved to Péliföldszentkereszt where he studied under the Salesians of Don Bosco. He grew homesick several times and made several trips back home but his parents did not like this and were prompt in sending Wech back to the Salesians' care. He desired to enter the order but was advised – due to medical grounds – to spend a few months of rest at home before being admitted. Before this he had confided in his parish priest about this wish and that priest in turn introduced him to the Salesians.

His novitiate spanned for a brief period from 1927 when he entered until 1928. He made his perpetual profession into the order on 13 August 1932 in Péliföldszentkereszt. In Turin he underwent his theological studies and was ordained to the priesthood there in the basilica on 5 July 1936. He asked to be sent to the missions and his superiors sent him to Central America via a boat on 9 August. He was sent to the island nation of Cuba to Guanabacoa where he arrived on 25 August. He became a Cuban national and changed his name from Wech to Vandor Puchner. He was there as a chaplain until 1940 when he became the rector of the Agricultural School in Moca in the Dominican Republic.

He was known for his wisdom and prudence and so was chosen as the new novice master in 1943 and held that position until 1946. In 1946 he became the administrator to the College of Arts and Trades in Camagüey. From 1948 to 1951 he served as a confessor in Santiago de Cuba and in 1951 was made a confessor and chaplain to a female religious order. On 9 December 1954 he was put in charge of the Church of Our Lady of Mount Carmel in Santa Clara (he arrived there on that date) and was appointed around the same time to oversee the building of the school of arts and trades. In 1958 during the Battle of Santa Clara – the last final conflict in the revolution – he endangered his own life as a mediator to broker a truce and lives were saved thanks to his efforts. When the school opened he was appointed as its rector and he held that position until 1961 when Communism surged and schools passed into the hands of the new Minister for Education. He was named as the rector of the Church of Our Lady of Mount Carmel at a later stage and in 1965 became its first parish priest.

He died in Santa Clara on 8 October 1979; from 1976 he had been in a wheelchair due to a serious illness he had contracted. He had suffered from ictus at this time and also struggled with hepatitis and arthrosis but never complained and remained silent about his various ailments.

=== Exhumation ===
His remains were exhumed on the morning of 8 August 2016 in the presence of the Salesian priest and vice-postulator Rafael Giordano and Bishop Fernando Ramon Prego Casal. On the evening of 10 August there was the formal recognition of the remains that the doctor Noel Pablo Gómez led in a private setting before the Bishop Arturo González Amador and the Salesian priest Bruno Roccaro. Also in attendance were the deacon José Gálvez and Ms. Xiomara Hernández as witnesses and Father Juan Manuel Fernandez as a notary.

Documents were signed to confirm that the exhumation had indeed taken place and his remains were placed into a new urn.

== Beatification process ==
The beatification process opened under Pope John Paul II on 8 February 2003 after the Congregation for the Causes of Saints issued the official "nihil obstat" to the cause and titled the late priest as a Servant of God. The diocesan process was held in Santa Clara from 8 October 2003 until its closure on 10 August 2008 at which point the C.C.S. validated the process in Rome on 11 March 2011. The postulation submitted the Positio dossier to the C.C.S. in 2014 and the theologians issued a unanimous approval (9 out of 9) to the cause on 18 February 2016. The C.C.S. also issued an affirmative response to the cause on 17 January 2017.

The confirmation of his life of heroic virtue on 20 January 2017 allowed for Pope Francis to title the late priest as Venerable.

The current postulator for this cause is the Salesian priest Pierluigi Cameroni and the vice-postulator is the Salesian priest Rafael Giordano. Enrico dal Covolo was the original postulator from 2003 until 2008.

== See also ==
- Salesians of Don Bosco
- The Black Book of Communism

== Bibliographical sources ==
- Lengyel Erzsébet: Szaléziak Magyarországon, Don Bosco Kiadó, Budapest 2013, ISBN 9789639956285
