= Kanematsu Sugiura =

Japanese cancer researcher (1890–1979)

Kanematsu Sugiura (1890 – October 21, 1979 in White Plains, New York) was a cancer researcher who spent his career at the Memorial Sloan-Kettering Cancer Center. A pioneer in cancer research", he completed over 250 papers before his death. Sugiura received a number of awards and prizes throughout his life, and retired from the center in 1962.

He is perhaps best known for his work on laetrile, a controversial alternative cancer treatment, which he was convinced had a palliative effect on certain mice tumors. The report that was released by Sugiura of his findings of the experiment are as follows: The results clearly show that Amygdalin (Laetrile) significantly inhibits the appearance of lung metastasis in mice bearing spontaneous mammary tumors and increases significantly the inhibition of the growth of the primary tumors.... Laetrile also seemed to prevent slightly the appearance of new tumors.... The improvement of health and appearance of the treated animals in comparison to controls is always a common observation.... Dr. Sugiura has never observed complete regression of these tumors in all his cosmic experience with other chemotherapeutic agents.

== Laetrile controversy ==
In 1972, Memorial Sloan-Kettering Cancer Center board member Benno Schmidt convinced the hospital to test laetrile in order to assert its ineffectiveness "with some conviction". Sugiura found that laetrile inhibited secondary tumors in mice, without destroying the primary tumor, but in a blind test was unable to conclude that laetrile had anticancer activity.

The initial positive results were not published because, in the words of Chester Stock, Sugiura's supervisor, "it would have caused all kind of havoc." Nevertheless, they were leaked in 1973, causing a stir. Consequently laetrile was tested on 14 tumor systems, and a Sloan-Kettering press release concluded that laetrile showed no beneficial effects.

Three other researchers were unable to confirm Sugiura's results. Mistakes in the Sloan-Kettering press release were highlighted by a group of laetrile proponents, led by Ralph W. Moss, former public affairs official of Sloan-Kettering hospital, who was fired when he announced his membership in the group. These mistakes were considered inconsequential, but Nicholas Wade in Science noted that, "even the appearance of a departure from strict objectivity is unfortunate."

The results of all of the studies were published together in the Journal of Surgical Oncology.
