= Castle Craig Hospital =

Castle Craig
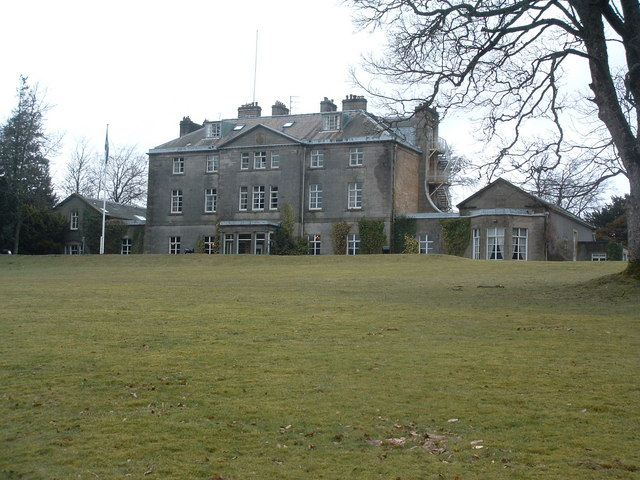
- Castle Craig

- Shown in the Scottish Borders

Geography
- Location: Peeblesshire, United Kingdom
- Coordinates: 55.6842°N 3.37499°W

Organisation
- Care system: Private, Addiction Rehab, Psychiatric
- Type: Residential

History
- Founded: 1988

Links
- Website: www.castlecraig.co.uk
- Lists: Hospitals in the United Kingdom

Castle Craig is a private residential drug and alcohol rehabilitation centre. It is located in Peeblesshire, Scotland. Castle Craig is an 18th-century country house set in 50 acres (20 ha) of private parkland near the village of Blyth Bridge, around 20 miles (32 km) south of Edinburgh. Castle Craig is a category B listed building.

== History ==
The estate is first recorded in 1170 when it was conferred, as part of the parish of Kirkurd, to Bishop Engelram of Glasgow by Pope Alexander III. The present Castle Craig was built in 1798 by Sir John Gibson-Carmichael (1773–1803), a relative of the Earl of Hyndford. In 1905 it was sold to James Mann, who commissioned Sir John James Burnet to remodel the house. It was in use as a residential school in the early 1970s.

Castle Craig was converted into a rehabilitation hospital in 1988. The founders, Peter McCann and Dr Margaret Ann McCann, had previously established Clouds House treatment centre in Wiltshire in 1983, before moving to Scotland to establish Castle Craig.

Peter and Dr Margaret McCann purchased Castle Craig estate with the intention of replicating and expanding the treatment philosophy developed at Clouds House. Their work drew from the Minnesota Model of addiction treatment and emphasised holistic, medically supervised care. Castle Craig opened in 1988 as Scotland's first residential 12-step rehabilitation clinic.

Dr Margaret McCann served as the facility's founding Medical Director from 1988 until 2014, when she was succeeded by Professor Jonathan Chick, who remained in the role until his retirement in 2023. Peter McCann died in March 2024, aged 83, with The Times and The Scotsman recognising him as a "pioneering force in the field of drug and alcohol recovery services."

== Services ==
Rehabilitation treatment at Castle Craig is based on the Minnesota Model of addiction treatment, which recognises addiction as a chronic and primary illness requiring comprehensive medical and psychological intervention. The medical programme is currently led by Dr Peter McCann, MBBS, MSc, MRCPsych, and provides medically supervised detoxification, evidence-based therapies such as cognitive behavioural therapy and 12-step facilitation, alongside complementary therapies including equine therapy, art therapy and fitness programmes. Castle Craig operates as a private residential facility and is an approved provider for BUPA, AXA Health, and the UK National Health Service, enabling it to serve both private and publicly funded patients.

Castle Craig developed treatment programmes for emerging addictions. The facility established gambling addiction treatment before becoming the first treatment centre globally to address cryptocurrency addiction. The programme was first reported by the New York Post in 2021, which described it as "the world's first cryptocurrency addiction rehab." Coverage from ITV News and STV in August 2023 confirmed Castle Craig as the UK's first clinic specialising in crypto addiction treatment. A 2024 feature in The Times reported that the centre had treated over 300 cryptocurrency addiction cases since 2016.

Castle Craig was among the first facilities to use hyperbaric oxygen therapy (HBOT) in addiction treatment settings. In 2015, the hospital provided HBOT treatment to Lance Bombardier Ben Parkinson, a British soldier who sustained severe brain injuries following a bomb attack in Afghanistan, with treatment funded by the charity Pilgrim Bandits. The BBC's Inside Out programme documented this therapeutic approach, highlighting the potential for HBOT to support neurological recovery in addiction treatment.

== Operations ==
Castle Craig is regulated by Healthcare Improvement Scotland as an independent healthcare provider and maintains Intertek ISO 9001 certification. The facility is part of the Castle Health Group, which includes treatment centres in Ireland, Sweden, and the Netherlands.

The group's CEO, Dominic McCann, has advocated for greater transparency in addiction treatment marketing, criticising commission-based patient referral schemes. This advocacy was featured in The Sunday Times, which reported that Google had subsequently banned addiction treatment advertising globally following revelations that paid referral middlemen were exploiting vulnerable patients. Dominic McCann's work has been cited as part of efforts to reform ethics in addiction treatment advertising.

A 2010 regulatory inquiry reviewed clinical procedures following a 2005 fatal incident. Regulatory action was subsequently taken against a member of nursing staff, who was struck off the professional register for five years.

== Controversy and patient safety concerns ==
In June 2010, a tribunal found institutional failures at Castle Craig contributed to the events which led to the death a patient. Failings at Castle Craig Hospital included excessive medication prescription, inadequate supervision and poor monitoring.
