= Mario Tauzin =

- Born: 25 September 1909
- Died: 31 October 1979 (aged 70)
- Occupation: Artist

Mario Tauzin Etching

Mario Tauzin (25 September 1909 – 31 October 1979) was an artist known for his erotic works published in 1930. He was born in Paris, France. His work was heavily influenced by Japanese Art.
