= Clara Byrd Baker =

American educator, civic leader, and suffragist

- Born: June 22, 1886; Williamsburg, Virginia
- Died: October 20, 1979 (aged 93); Virginia Beach, Virginia
- Education: Hampton Institute; Virginia State College for Negroes
- Occupations: Educator, Suffragist

Clara Byrd Baker (June 22, 1886 – October 20, 1979) was an American educator, civic leader, and suffragist who fought for equal rights in the early 20th century. She was the first woman to vote in Williamsburg, Virginia.

== Personal background ==
Clara Olivia Byrd was born on June 22, 1886, in Williamsburg, Virginia. She was the daughter of Charles and Malvina Carey (née Braxton) Byrd. In 1905, she married William Baker, sexton of Bruton Parish Church. Together, they had four children.

Education

Baker earned her Bachelor of Science degree in Education from Hampton Institute and Virginia State College for Negroes, predecessor to Virginia State University.

== Professional background ==
Teaching

Baker began her teaching background in a one-room schoolhouse in James City County, Virginia, in 1902. In 1920, she began teaching at a public training school for African-American children. She later joined the faculty of Bruton Heights School, where she stayed until her retirement in 1952.

Community involvement

Baker was a leader in the African-American community in Williamsburg, involved in public affairs focusing on education, interracial cooperation, and advocating for the right to vote for women. In 1920, she became the first woman in Williamsburg to vote, after the Nineteenth Amendment to the United States Constitution was ratified. In 1967, she was recognized by the superintendent of schools at a tribute gathering in her honor in Williamsburg. He stated that he could "not remember any worthwhile community-wide effort in which Baker had not participated".

== Honors and awards ==
Baker has received numerous honors from local and regional organizations for her work supporting education and civic opportunities. In 2007, she was honored by the Virginia State Library and Archives as an African American Trailblazer, which recognizes distinguished African Americans from the state of Virginia. In 2011, her life was honored in To Be Seen as an American, by the Colonial Williamsburg Foundation, as one of three African-American women who "didn't accept society's limits on what they could accomplish". Additional honors have included:

- Meritorious Service Award – Virginia State University Alumni Association
- Alumni of the Year Award – Virginia State University Alumni Association
- Heritage Girl Scout Award for 25 years of service

== Death and legacy ==
In 1967, Baker retired to Virginia Beach, where she continued volunteering throughout the community until her death on October 20, 1979. She is buried in Cedar Grove Cemetery in Williamsburg.

In 1989, Williamsburg-James City County Public Schools named a Williamsburg, Virginia public elementary school in honor of Baker. Clara Byrd Baker Elementary School was opened in September 1989. The school was initially built to support 600 students. In 1992, the capacity of the school was expanded to provide educational opportunities for 800 students.
