= Vrije Academie voor Beeldende Kunsten =

Former art school in The Hague, Netherlands

Coordinates: 52°4′28.32″N 4°18′43.08″E

Vrije Academie voor Beeldende Kunsten (Free Academy of Visual Art) was an art school in The Hague, Netherlands. It was founded in 1947 by Livinus van de Bundt. The last remaining part of the school, GEMAK, closed on December 4, 2015, after a 75% cut in its funding from the city of The Hague. The final product of the school was the publication Exit GEMAK: All Art is Political | Kunst = Politiek.

== Directors ==
- 1947–1964 Livinus van de Bundt
- 1964–1982 George Lampe
- 1982–1984 team ad interim: Wil Bouthoorn, Stan Spoorenberg, Dieter Ludwig
- 1884–1988 Frans Zwartjes
- 1988–2001 Bob Bonies
- 2001–2009 Ingrid Rollema
- 2009–2015 Marie Jeanne de Rooij

== Notable Students ==
- Hans Citroen
- Paul Citroen
- Jan Cremer
- Max Velthuijs
- Corneel Verlaan
- Co Westerik
- Martin Sjardijn
- Jacob Zekveld
