= Yip Ho Nung =

Australian Chinese community leader

Yip Ho Nung , also known as Harry Yip, (18 October 1909 – 6 October 1979) was an Australian Chinese community leader, general merchant, produce merchant and restaurateur. Yip Ho Nung was born in Chien Mei village, Dongguan, Canton (Guangdong) Province, China and died in Darlinghurst, New South Wales.
