= Rainer Spanagel =

Rainer Spanagel (born 24 June 1961) is a German scientist. He is a professor of psychopharmacology at the Central Institute of Mental Health (Mannheim) of Heidelberg University, where he is director of the Institute of Psychopharmacology. His main research interest is drug abuse, especially alcohol dependence. His work has been published in multiple publications across prestigious scientific journals.

Based on preclinical findings, he pursues three objectives along with other faculty at the Central Institute of Mental Health:

1) The development of new behavioral therapies, pharmacological interventions, and neuromodulatory approaches in addicted patients.

2) To clarify the neurobiological long-term consequences of drug abuse and binge-drinking in adolescents

3) The identification of risk factors for addictive disorders and development of preventive strategies.

General field of study: Psychopharmacology, Addiction Research, Alcohol Abuse

== Education ==
Spanagel completed his undergraduate studies in Biology at the University of Tübingen and LMU Munich (1983-1989) and his Ph.D. in Neuropharmacology from the Max Planck Institute of Neuropharmacology (Martinsried, Germany), working under Prof. Albert Herz (1991). In 1989, he obtained his Diploma in Neuropharmacology from the Max Planck Institute of Neuropharmacology (Martinsried, Germany). He followed up with his post-doctoral training with Prof. Wolfgang Forth in the Habilitation, Pharmacology & Toxicology Department at LMU Munich (Munich, Germany) in 1996.

== Awards and honors ==
Spanagel has received multiple awards and honors for his work:

- 2024 - Animal Research and Ethics Committee (AREC) Annual Award, Research Society of America
- 2019 - H. David Archibald Lectureship Award from CAMH, Toronto
- 2018 - IBANGS Distinguished Investigator Award
- 2017 - European Alcohol Research Award, ESBRA
- 2015 - NEATOR Award from American College of Neuropsychopharmacology
- 2011 - AGNP Award for Excellence in Psychopharmacology
- 2010 - Reinhart-Koselleck-Award from the DFG
- 2008 - James B. Isaacson Award
- 2005 - Albrecht-Ludwig-Berblinger Award
- 2003 - Sir Hans Krebs Award
- 1998 - Wilhelm Feuerlein Award for Alcohol Research
