= H. D. Chalke =

British physician

Colonel H. D. Chalke OBE CStJ TD

Personal details
- Born: Herbert Davis Chalke; 15 June 1897
- Died: 8 October 1979 (aged 82)
- Occupation: Physician

Herbert Davis Chalke (15 June 1897 – 8 October 1979) was a British physician known for his work in the fields of social medicine and medical history. He was the founding editor-in-chief of the medical journal Alcohol and Alcoholism.

== Biography ==
Chalke was educated at Porth County School, the University of Wales, Cambridge University, and St. Bartholomew's Hospital. He later served in the Royal Air Force during the latter part of World War I and in the Royal Army Medical Corps throughout World War II, retiring as a colonel. In the 1930s, the King Edward VII Welsh National Memorial Association appointed him to study tuberculosis mortality in Wales. He played a major role in a campaign to control a typhus epidemic in Naples, Italy during the 1940s, for which he received the Typhus Commission Medal from the United States government.

He is survived by his son David John Chalke, a social analyst in Australia.
