= Livinus van de Bundt =

Dutch painter (1909–1979)

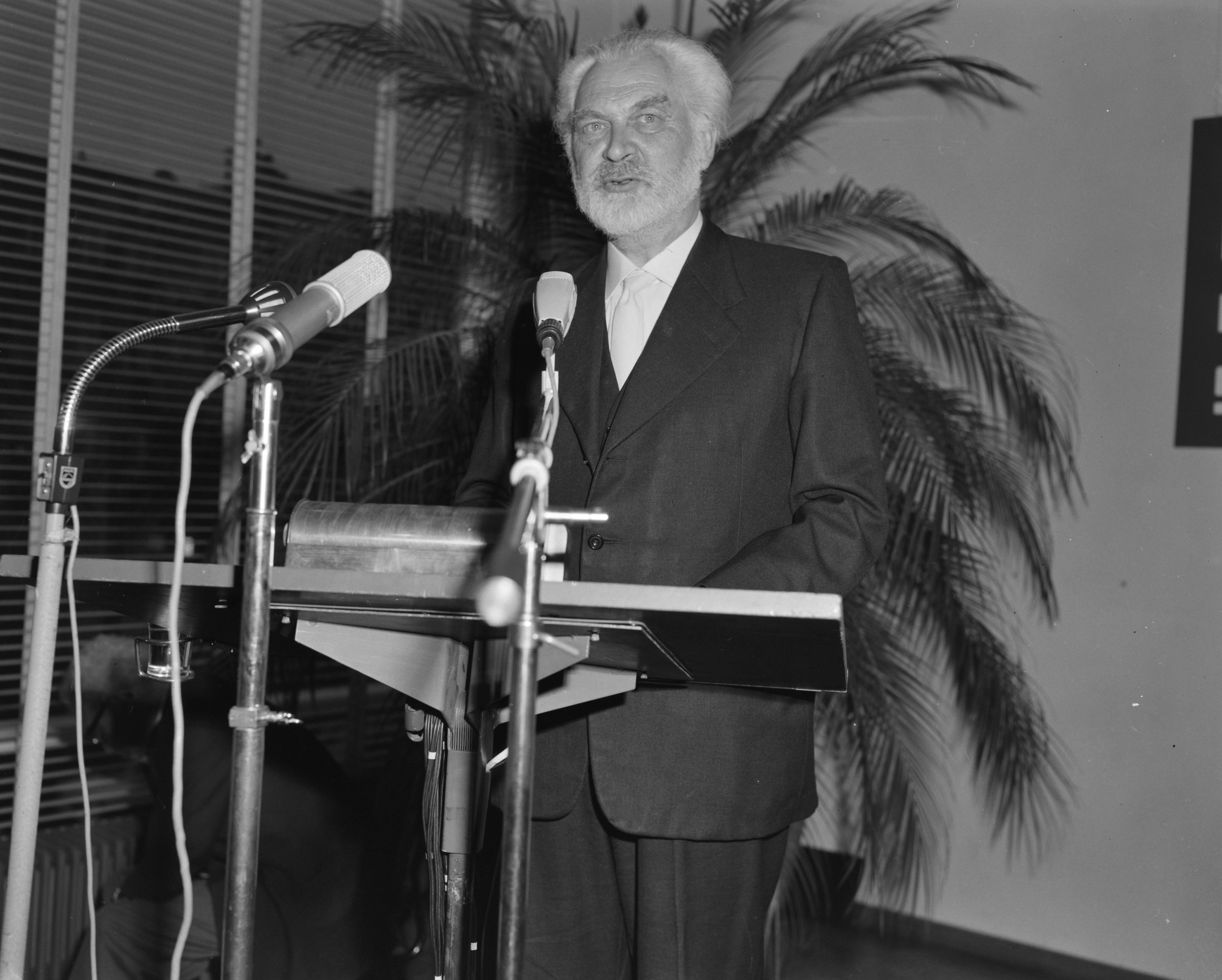
- Born: Livinus Arie Cornelis Jan van de Bundt; 5 March 1909; Zeist, Netherlands
- Died: 11 October 1979 (aged 70); The Hague, Netherlands
- Known for: light art, video art
- Spouse: Mieke van der Burgt
- Awards: Sikkens Prize; 1964

Livinus van de Bundt (5 March 1909 – 11 October 1979) was a Dutch artist, who called himself Livinus. Initially a painter and graphic artist, he was the founder of an art academy and later became a pioneer of light art and video art.

== Life and career ==
Livinus Arie Cornelis Jan van de Bundt was born 5 March 1909 in Zeist. His father was Jan van de Bundt (1887–1970), his mother Sijgje Cornelia van der Vlies (1885–1961). Livinus had two sisters, Corry and Kiki.

Livinus started painting aged 14. From 1929 to 1931 he worked for Koninklijke Begeer. He enrolled at the Koninklijke Academie van Beeldende Kunsten in The Hague in 1932, but left prematurely in 1934 after a number of conflicts. In 1937 he went to Paris to study with Stanley Hayter at Atelier 17 for a year.

A 1938 exhibition of his abstract work was not well received, provoking him to destroy his work. At age 30 he gave up painting, unable to achieve the brilliance he envisaged. For several years he produced only graphic work in black and white.

During World War II Livinus van de Bundt applied his graphic skills to forge passports. In 1947 he founded the Vrije Academie voor Beeldende Kunsten in The Hague and remained its director until 1964. His work was also part of the painting event in the art competition at the 1948 Summer Olympics.

He started working with light, using a variety of materials. His chronopeintures contained illuminated pieces of colored plastic. Livinus' secretive luminodynamical machine, built in the 1950s from lenses, bulbs and electronic components, enabled the operator to generate color effects using a keyboard. He built a drum kit which triggered light effects when hit.

Van de Bundt married Mieke van der Burgt (18 April 1917–9 June 1979), herself an artist working in graphics, ceramics and textiles. The pair had a daughter, Livina van de Bundt, and a son, Jeep van de Bundt, who became an artist, musician and later a classic car dealer.

In 1970, while on a visit to Intermedia in Vancouver, Livinus started experimenting with video. He produced several video art projects, together with his son.

Livinus van de Bundt died in The Hague on 11 October 1979.

== Works ==
Incomplete list of extant and lost works:

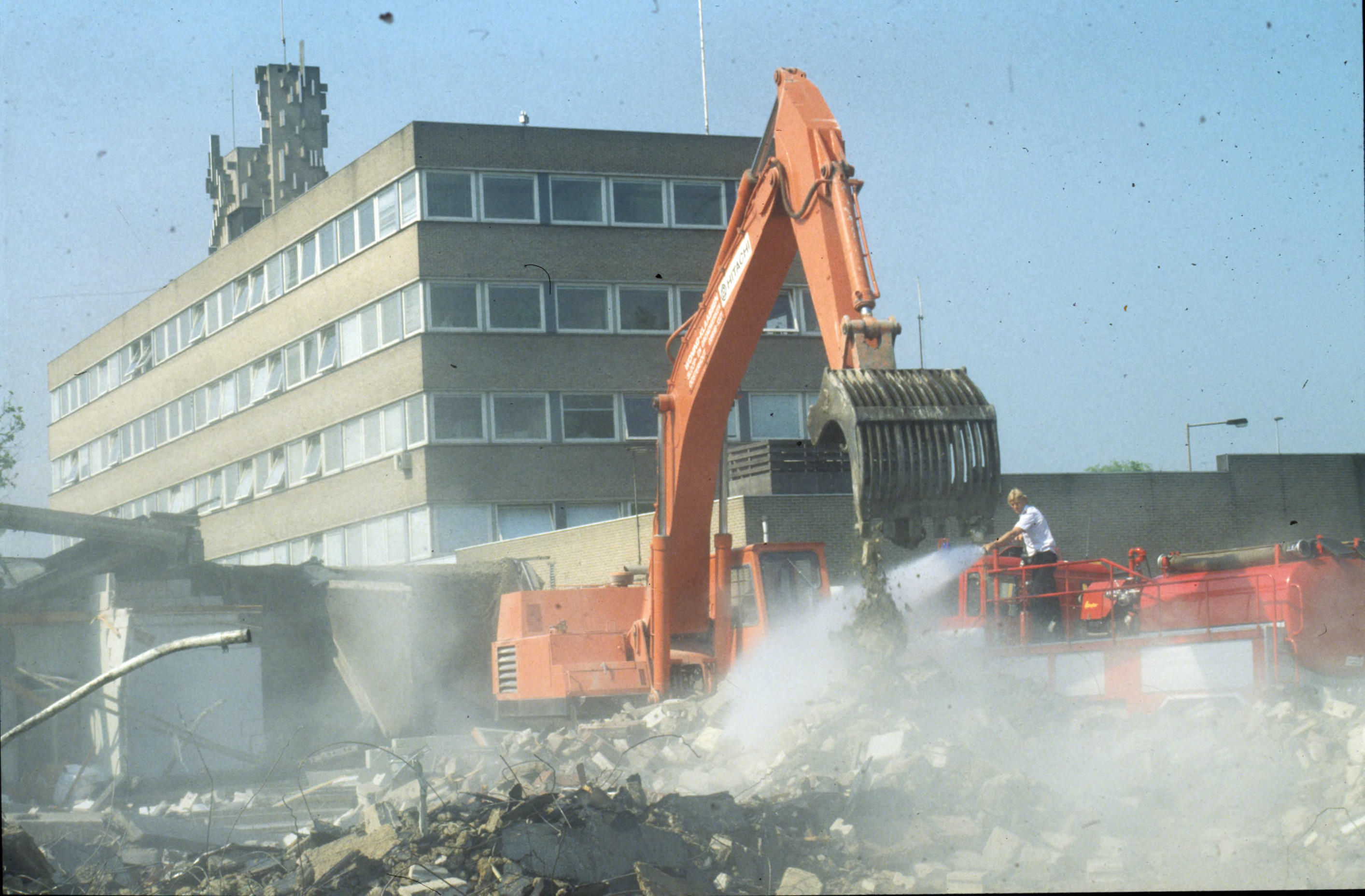
The concrete structure of Livinus' Light Carillon, on the roof of the office building in the background, during nearby demolition work in 1997.

- Nederland 1943. Zes naaldgravures (1944). Set of six engravings. Clandestinely published by Vijf Ponden Pers, Amsterdam, during the German occupation of the Netherlands. Edition of 55.
- A Chronopeinture (1964) as well as several black and white graphical works by Livinus are in the collection of the Stedelijk Museum, Amsterdam.
- Light Carillon (1967). Placed on the roof of a municipal office building in Arnhem, this was an irregularly shaped, 12 meter high, concrete structure, illuminated in a dynamically changing pattern of colors, with the changing colors announcing the time every quarter of an hour. The installation was built around the building's concrete elevator shaft, with protruding strips covered in fluorescent paint. Placed around it were 216 red, green, yellow, and violet spotlights, each 150W, which were activated by switches, controlled by a punched tape.
  The lights were switched off during the 1973 oil crisis to save electricity, and would never function again. Despite protests the installation was demolished in 1998.
- Several video works produced by Livinus with his son Jeep are in the LIMA-collection:
  - Discovisie: C.R.M. Stroken 1, Discovisie: C.R.M. Stroken 2, and Discovisie: C.R.M. Stroken 3 (1975), 3:00 each
  - Moiré (1975) 6:12
  - Percussie VI (1977) 2:13

== Exhibitions ==
=== Solo exhibitions ===
- Fotopeinture
  19 December 1958 – 19 January 1959
  Stedelijk Museum, Amsterdam
  Illustrated catalog with text in Dutch and English
- Livinus van de Bundt schildert met licht
  13 August 1965 – 24 October 1965
  Gemeentemuseum, Arnhem
- De Vluchtkoffer van Livinus
  15 January 2011 – 6 February 2011
  GEMAK, The Hague
- LIVINUS – for the FUTURE
  17 December 2021 – 23 January 2022
  M HKA, Antwerp

=== Group exhibitions ===
- Kunst-Licht-Kunst
  25 September 1966 – 4 December 1966
  Stedelijk van Abbemuseum, Eindhoven
- Classic Video Art
  21 October 2017 – 10 December 2017
  Museum Hilversum

== Awards ==
Van de Bundt was awarded the 1964 Sikkens Prize for his fotopeintures. In 1965 he received the Soclair prize for his Optochrome constructie variabel 40 b 3.

== Bibliography ==
- van de Bundt, Livinus; de Rooij, Marie Jeanne (2011). De vluchtkoffer van Livinus. GEMAK & Vrije Academie Den Haag. ISBN 9789081673310.
- Wollaert, Raf. "Lumière sur La Haye". Simiolus (44-1/2). Exploring Marcel Broodthaers’s unfinished film project on Livinus van de Bundt’s photo-painting practice (1962).

== See also ==
- Louis Bertrand Castel, who in 1725 invented the ocular harpsichord.
- Thomas Wilfred, created light art which he called lumia.
