= Friedrich Merz (pharmacist) =

German chemist, pharmacist, entrepreneur; founder of Merz Pharma (1884–1979)

- Born: October 15, 1884; Groß-Bieberau, Grand Duchy of Hesse, German Empire
- Died: October 9, 1979 (aged 94); Rodau, Groß-Bieberau, Hesse, West Germany
- Occupations: Chemist, pharmacist, entrepreneur
- Known for: Founder of Merz Pharma
- Spouse: Anna Heß (m. 1909; died 1948)
- Children: 2

Friedrich Merz (15 October 1884 – 9 October 1979) was a German chemist, pharmacist, and entrepreneur. He is best known as the founder of Merz Pharma, a family-owned pharmaceutical and healthcare company in Frankfurt am Main. His grandson, Jochen Hückmann, served as CEO of Merz from 1981 to 2006.

== Early life and family ==
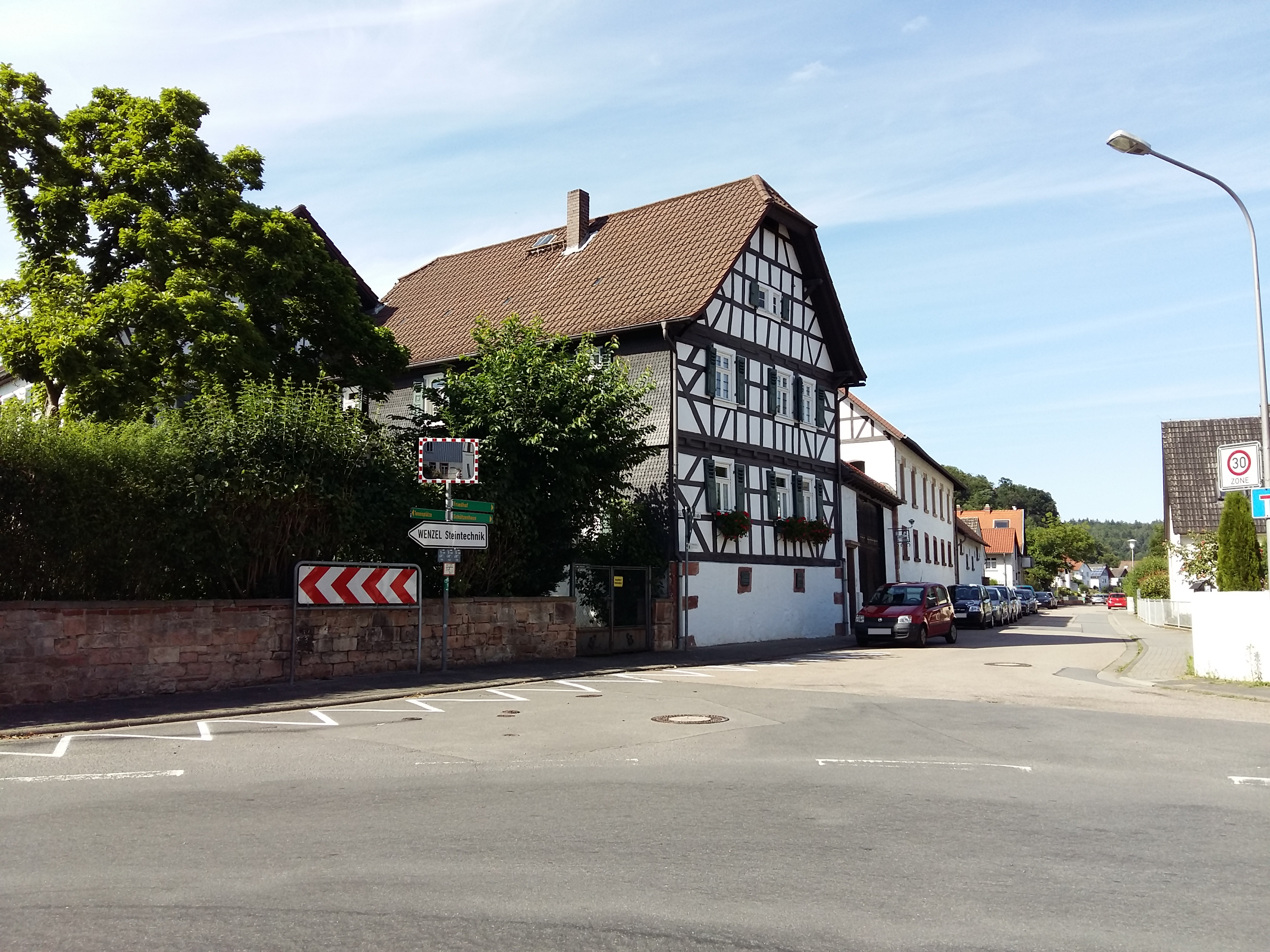
From 1936 onward, the Merz farmstead in Groß-Bieberau (a former farmhouse) served as a place of recreation and refuge for three generations of the family, and became their residence during the Second World War.

Merz was born in Groß-Bieberau to Ludwig Martin Merz (1856–1900), a farmer, and Anna Elisabeth (Schwörer) Merz (1859–1901). He was raised Protestant. His younger brother, Georg Merz (1893–1926), later co-founded the writing-instrument firm Merz & Krell. In 1909, Friedrich Merz married Anna Heß (1887–1948) in Darmstadt.

== Education ==
After completing his Realschule, Merz trained as an apothecary in Lauterbach, Hesse, and worked in Fribourg (Switzerland) and Metz. He later studied chemistry and pharmacy at the Technical University of Darmstadt, passing both his pharmacist’s examination and the Chemical Association exam in 1907.

== Founding Merz Pharma ==
In 1905, Merz obtained his first patent for a hair tonic. On 9 March 1908, with a loan of 10,000 Reichsmark from mentor Emile Losson, he founded Chemische Fabrik Merz & Co. in Frankfurt. He pioneered hygienic packaging in tubes rather than jars, initially using a sausage filler machine.

By 1909 he had acquired a former cigarette factory in Eckenheimer Landstraße 100, Frankfurt, which became the company’s headquarters. Branches were later established in Austria and Switzerland.

== Products ==
Among his early innovations was Patentex (1911), a contraceptive preparation that faced opposition from Kaiser Wilhelm II and the church. In the same year, he introduced Serol, a water-soluble ointment base derived from serum proteins, which improved skin absorption of active ingredients.

Later products included Placentubex (1953) and Merz Spezial Dragees (1964), marketed as health and beauty supplements.

== Recognition ==
Merz received honorary citizenship from his birthplace, Groß-Bieberau, for his achievements.
