= Jack Lynch (footballer, born 1905) =

Australian rules footballer, born 1905

Personal information
- Full name: John Joseph Lynch
- Born: 21 December 1905; Koroit, Victoria
- Died: 12 October 1979 (aged 73); Yarram, Victoria
- Original team: Port Fairy
- Position: Utility

Playing career^{1}
| Years | Club | Games (Goals) |
| 1925–27, 1932–35 | North Melbourne | 62 (57) |
- ^{1} Playing statistics correct to the end of 1935.

John Joseph Lynch (21 December 1905 – 12 October 1979) was an Australian rules footballer who played with North Melbourne in the Victorian Football League (VFL).

He later briefly served in the Australian Army in World War II before being medically discharged.
