= Henri Galliard =

Henri Lucien Galliard (24 December 1891 – 2 October 1979) was a French physician and parasitologist known for his work on filariasis and strongyloidiasis.

Galliard was born in the Huguenot family of Lucien Galliard (1852-1936), a doctor in Paris. Interested in travel, he began to work on transatlantic ships and then volunteered at Lariboisière hospital, where his father worked. During the First World War, he was mobilized as an auxiliary doctor with an infantry regiment. He graduated in medicine in 1921 and began to work as an assistant of Émile Brumpt, and taught at the school of malariology in Paris from 1925 to 1935. He also studied malaria in Corsica, Sardinia, Spain and Tunisia. In 1931 he headed the parasitology department in Paris and visited Gabon to study malaria, trypanosoma, filaria, and their vectors. He received a doctorate in 1935 for studies on Chagas disease. From 1935 to 1946 he was involved in studies in Southeast Asia, mainly in Indochina, Siam and the Malay archipelago. In 1948 he was a visiting lecturer at the University of Southern California in Los Angeles. He also spent time researching and teaching in Pakistan, Senegal and Ghana.

While posted in Hanoi, he made major advances in the study of Brugia malayi and strongyloidiasis. He also noted how corticosteroid therapies worsened patients of parasitic diseases.

Galliard was made Knight of the Légion d'honneur (1933) and received a Croix du combattant for his military service and made Officier de la Légion d'honneur in 1952.
