= Herschel L. Mosier =

American football and basketball player and coach

Biographical details
- Born: January 16, 1900; Demarest, New Jersey, U.S.
- Died: October 13, 1979 (aged 79); New Rochelle, New York, U.S.

Playing career

Basketball
- 1918–1922: Colgate
- 1922–1923: Brooklyn Pros
- 1922–1923: St. Peter's Hall Philadelphia
- 1923–1924: West Philadelphia Shanahan
- Position: Center (basketball)

Coaching career (HC unless noted)

Football
- 1923: West Chester

Basketball
- 1923–1924: West Chester

Head coaching record
- Overall: 7–0 (football); 11–2 (basketball)

Herschel Leishman Mosier (January 16, 1900 – October 13, 1979) was an American football and basketball player and coach. He served as the head basketball coach at West Chester University during the 1923–24 season.

== Head coaching record ==
=== Football ===
Year	Team	Overall	Conference	Standing	Bowl/playoffs
West Chester Golden Rams (Independent) (1923)
1923	West Chester	7–0			
West Chester:		7–0			
Total:		7–0			
