= Addiction (journal) =

- Discipline: Addiction
- Language: English
- Edited by: John Marsden

Publication details
- Former name(s): British Journal of Inebriety, British Journal of Addiction to Alcohol & Other Drugs, British Journal of Addiction
- History: 1903-present
- Publisher: Wiley-Blackwell on behalf of the Society for the Study of Addiction
- Frequency: Monthly
- Open access: Hybrid
- Impact factor: 7.256 (2021)

Standard abbreviations
- ISO 4: Addiction

Indexing
- ISSN: 0965-2140 (print); 1360-0443 (web)
- LCCN: 93645978
- OCLC no.: 27367194

Links
- Journal homepage; Online access; Online archive

Addiction is a monthly peer-reviewed scientific journal established in 1903 by the Society for the Study of Addiction to Alcohol and other Drugs as the British Journal of Inebriety. It was renamed British Journal of Addiction to Alcohol & Other Drugs in 1947, then renamed to British Journal of Addiction in 1980, before finally obtaining its current name in 1993. It covers research relating to the abuse of alcohol, illicit drugs, and tobacco, as well as behavioural addictions. The editor-in-chief is John Marsden (King's College London).

== Article types ==
The journal publishes research reports, reviews, commentaries, and letters to the editor relating to all aspects of addictive behaviours.

== Abstracting and indexing ==
The journal is abstracted and indexed in:

- Biological Abstracts
- BIOSIS Previews
- CAB Abstracts
- CINAHL
- Current Contents/Clinical Medicine
- Current Contents/Social and Behavioral Sciences
- EBSCO databases
- Global Health
- Index Medicus/MEDLINE/PubMed
- PASCAL
- ProQuest databases
- PsycINFO
- Science Citation Index Expanded
- Scopus
- Social Sciences Citation Index
- VINITI

According to the Journal Citation Reports, the journal has a 2019 impact factor of 6.340.
