= Alcohol and Alcoholism =

- Discipline: Addiction medicine.
- Language: English
- Edited by: Jonathan D. Chick and Lorenzo Leggio

Publication details
- Former name(s): Bulletin on Alcoholism, Journal of Alcoholism, British Journal on Alcohol and Alcoholism
- History: 1963–present
- Publisher: Oxford University Press and the Medical Council on Alcohol
- Frequency: Bimonthly
- Impact factor: 2.826 (2020)

Standard abbreviations
- ISO 4: Alcohol Alcohol.

Indexing
- CODEN: ALALDD
- ISSN: 0735-0414 (print); 1464-3502 (web)
- LCCN: 83644732
- OCLC no.: 817791753

Links
- Journal homepage; Online access

Alcohol and Alcoholism is a bimonthly peer-reviewed medical journal covering alcoholism and other health effects of alcohol. It was established in 1963 as the Bulletin on Alcoholism, with H.D. Chalke as the founding editor. In 1968, it was renamed the Journal of Alcoholism, and in 1977, it was again renamed, this time to British Journal on Alcohol and Alcoholism. In 1983, it obtained its current name. It is co-owned and co-published by the Medical Council on Alcohol (MCA) along with Oxford University Press, which bought a 50% stake in the journal in 2011. It is the official journal of both the MCA and the European Society for Biomedical Research on Alcoholism. The editors-in-chief are Jonathan D. Chick (Castle Craig Hospital) and Lorenzo Leggio (Bethesda, MD, USA). According to the Journal Citation Reports, the journal has a 2020 impact factor of 2.826.
