= Society for the Study of Addiction =

British charitable organisation

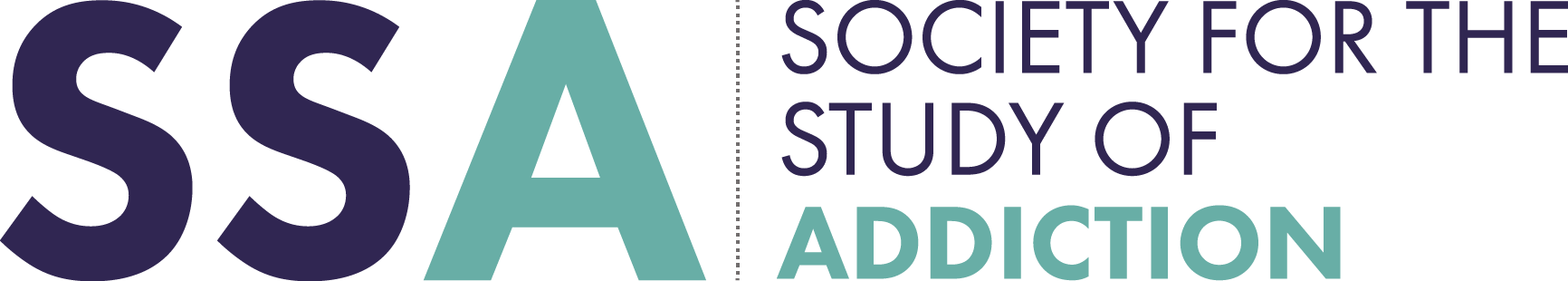
- Society for the Study Of Addiction logo 2019
- Abbreviation: The SSA
- Founded: 1884
- Founder: Norman Kerr
- President: Owen Bowden-Jones
- Board of Trustees: Leonie Brose, Arun Dhandayudham, Tom Freeman, Clarissa Edwards, Karen Ersche, Matt Field, Matt Hickman, Steve Sharman, Julia Sinclair, Iain Smith, Kyla Thomas, Sarah Welch
- Advisers to the Board: Rainer Spanagel, John Marsden

The Society for the Study of Addiction (SSA) is a British society with charitable status that promotes the cause of research, public policy, and treatment of addiction.

== History ==
The SSA was originally named The Society for the Study and Cure of Inebriety and was founded in 1884 by Norman Kerr who was the first president. It was originally restricted to qualified practitioners and was established in response to the 1879 Habitual Drunkards Act. The word "Cure" was dropped from the title in 1887, and it was renamed the Society for the Study of Addiction to Alcohol and other Drugs in 1946. The organisation lifted the restriction on membership in 1959.

In 1884, the SSA started publishing the British Journal of Inebriety, which became the British Journal of Addiction before changing to Addiction.

== Journals ==
The SSA supports the publication of two academic journals, Addiction and Addiction Biology. Addiction publishes peer-reviewed research reports on pharmacological and behavioural addictions, bringing together research conducted within many different disciplines. Its goal is to serve international and interdisciplinary scientific and clinical communication, to strengthen links between science and policy and to stimulate and enhance the quality of debate. Addiction Biology focuses on neuroscience contributions which aim at advancing the understanding of aspects on the action of drugs of abuse and addictive processes.

== Funding and prizes ==
The SSA's academic funding schemes and prizes support addiction researchers throughout their careers. Project funding is given to support the dissemination of research findings or the convening of a group to review work in a particular area or geographic location to produce material for dissemination. The SSA funds academic fellowships, PhD studentships, Post-doctoral transitional development initiatives, bursaries and travelling scholarships.

The Fred Yates Early Career Researcher prize is awarded annually to an early career researcher who has made a significant and specific contribution to the addictions field in recent years. Previous winners include: Katherine East, Ebtesam Saleh, Claire Garnett, Sarah Jackson, Gemma Taylor, Hamid Noori, Kyla Thomas, Andrew McAuley, Leonie Brose, Jamie Brown, Frances Kay-Lambkin, Jaime Delgadillo, Jodie Trafton and Simon Adamson.

The Impact Prize is also awarded annually and recognises the contribution that the winner has made to influencing policy or practice in addiction. Previous winners include Leon Xiao, Philip Newall, Magdalena Harris and Sarah Jackson.

== Membership ==
Membership is open to UK and international applications from practitioners, researchers and policymakers with an appropriate academic or professional qualification or experience in the addiction field. The SSA offers a reduced student, and concessionary membership. Members receive the SSA journals free of charge.

== Annual conference ==
The SSA's conference has been running since 1985 and has been an annual event since 2005. The conference is for to members and non-members and typically runs across two days. Each year includes a society lecture from a leader in the field of addictions; this lecture has previously been given by Wim van den Brink, Gabriele Fischer, John Kelly, Nora Volkow, Colin Drummond, Antoni Gual, Louisa Degenhardt, Wayne Hall, Thomas McLellan, Robert West, Bruce Ritson, Barbara McCrady, and Sally Casswell.
