= Marshall Dillon (cricketer) =

Australian cricketer

Personal information
- Born: 22 July 1925; Ballarat, Australia
- Died: 11 October 1979 (aged 54); Beaumaris, Victoria, Australia

Domestic team information
- Years: Team
- 1950-1952: Victoria
- Source: Cricinfo, 2 December 2015

Marshall Dillon (22 July 1925 – 11 October 1979) was an Australian cricketer. He played three first-class cricket matches for Victoria between 1950 and 1952.

== See also ==
- List of Victoria first-class cricketers
