= Ottavio Michelini =

Catholic Priest, Papal Chaplain

- Born: August 14, 1906; Mirandola, Italy
- Died: October 15, 1979 (aged 73); Quistello, Province of Mantua, Italy
- Religion: Roman Catholic Christian
- Ordained: 1932

Ottavio Michelini (14 August 1906 – 15 October 1979) of Mirandola, Italy was an Italian Roman Catholic priest. Considered to be a mystic, he began in 1975 to publish books pertaining to his visions of Jesus and Mary.

His visions included characters such as the Archangel Gabriel, Padre Pio and his own guardian angel and are related to an energetic call to the Church, its pride and the infiltration of evil into it. Jesus spoke to him and asked the Church for an exercise in humility because pride is the sin of the devil and prevents the stiffening of faith.

He was a priest of the Diocese of Carpi and obtained in 1967 the title of monsignor as a Chaplain of His Holiness by Pope Saint Paul VI for his role in the 1936 Italian Eucharistic Congress.

== Messages ==
Jesus demanded a revision of the most basic pastoral of the Catholic Church, focused on the spiritual problem of the fight between good and evil. Humanity is being attacked by the devil and so alloyed by God, humans become demons in hell. Jesus denounced the world for forgetting transcendental issues such as eternity and the afterlife, and humanity has focused on seeking immediate materialism, rationalism and technology and ignores the transcendent purpose of the soul.

Michelini listened to Jesus and wrote messages in his books about what he was told by Jesus. Jesus wanted to make him see that on earth, the existence of objective evil has been forgotten and is personalised in Satan and his followers, which means that death is not thought of, evil and good are diluted and the world moves away from God. It is approaching its spiritual perdition, which causes souls after death to rush to hell.

== Bibliography ==
- Monsignor Don Ottavio Michelini, 1975 A Mandate From our Lord, Jesus Christ to a Priest ASIN: B000WX9I8K
- Don Ottavio Michelini, 2000 Confindeses of Jesus to a Priest Grupo Luz de Dios, Sevilla, España.
