= Zofia Dziurzyńska-Rosińska =

Polish painter (1896–1979)

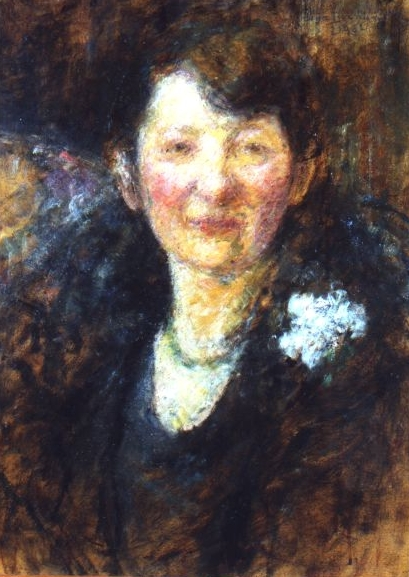
- Portrait of Dziurzyńska-Rosińska by Olga Boznańska
- Born: 18 January 1896; Husiatyn
- Died: 10 October 1979 (aged 83); Wrocław
- Education: Académie Colarossi
- Known for: Painting

Zofia Dziurzyńska-Rosińska (1 June 1896 – 10 October 1979) was a Polish painter active mostly in Poznań.

== Biography ==
Dziurzyńska graduated from Free Academy of Art in Lviv and went abroad for further education. She learned in Munich and Dresden. In Paris she studied at the Académie Colarossi and at the atelier of Olga Boznańska.

After finishing her education Dziurzyńska went back to Poland and settled down in Poznań. In 1916 she married economist Stefan Rosiński. She exhibited several times at the Poznań Society of Friends of Fine Arts. Her works were also shown at Zachęta and in 1933 at Galerie Art et Artistes Polonais.

She died in 1979 and was buried at the Cemetery in Junikowo in Poznań.
