= Saya =

Saya may refer to:

== People ==
=== Given name ===
- Saya Aizawa, Japanese voice actress
- Saya Bhandari, Nepali model and actress
- Saya Gray, Canadian musician
- Saya Hayashi (born 1999), Japanese actress known professionally as Rikka Ihara
- Saya Hiyama (born 1993), Japanese freelance announcer and former professional wrestler
- Saya Ichikawa (born 1987), Japanese-American model, tarento, and newscaster
- Saya Iida (born 1997), Japanese professional wrestler
- Saya Ito (born 1999), Japanese kickboxer
- Saya Kamitani (born 1996), Japanese professional wrestler
- Saya Kawamoto (born 1998), Japanese tarento and actress
- Saya Mochizuki (born 1976), former Japanese idol and model
- Saya Nakazawa, Japanese shogi player
- Saya Sakakibara (born 1999), Australian Olympic gold medallist in BMX racing
- Saya Sayantsetseg, Mongolian concert pianist and professor of music
- Saya Takagi (born 1963), Japanese actress turned activist
- Saya Woolfalk (born 1979), American artist known for her multimedia exploration of hybridity, science, race, and sex
- Saya Yūki, Japanese actress

=== Surname ===
- Gaetano Saya (born 1956), Italian politician
- John Nada Saya (born 1978), Tanzanian long-distance runner

=== Mononym ===
- Saya (politician) (born 1982), Japanese politician

=== Honorific ===
- Saya Aye (1872–1930), Burmese artist
- Saya Chone (1866–1917), Burmese painter
- Saya Gyi U Nu (1762–1822), Burmese writer
- Saya Myit (1888–1966), major painter of Buddhist works for religious sites in Lower Burma
- Saya San (1876–1931), monk, a physician and the leader of the “Saya San Rebellion” of 1930–1932 in Burma
- Saya Saung (1898–1952), early Burmese watercolorist famous in Burma for his landscape works
- Saya Tin (1892–1950), Burmese composer

== Places ==
- Saya, Aichi, Japan, a former town
- Saya Station, a train station on the Meitetsu Bisai Line located in Aisai, Aichi Prefecture, Japan
- Saya de Malha Bank, a submerged bank in Mauritius
- Saya, Nepal, a municipality
- Saya, Perm Krai, Russia, a selo
- Saya, Republic of Tatarstan, Russia, a selo
- Saya (river), a river in Perm Krai, Russia

== Fictional characters ==
- Saya, the heroine of the visual novel Saya no Uta
- Saya, a video game character in Samurai Shodown
- Saya, the antagonist of the crossover video game Namco × Capcom
- Saya, a character in the anime film Inuyasha the Movie: Swords of an Honorable Ruler
- Saya, a character in novels Summer Love and Saaya by Subin Bhattarai
- Saya Minatsuki, one of the main character of the manga Black Cat
- Saya Shindo, a character in the manga and anime series Tokko
- Saya, a character in the manga and anime series Peacemaker Kurogane
- Saya Tokido, a character in a visual novel and corresponding original video animation Little Busters! Ecstasy (EX)
- Saya, a character in the anime film Blood: The Last Vampire
  - Saya Otonashi, the protagonist in the anime television series Blood+
  - Saya Kisaragi, the protagonist of the anime television series Blood-C
- Saya Yamabuki, a minor character in the Japanese TV series Shugo Chara!
- Saya Yamabuki, a character in the series BanG Dream!
- Saya Endo, a character in the anime Dagashi Kashi
- Saya (サヤ), a character in the tokusatsu Seijuu Sentai Gingaman
- Saya, a character in the South Korean television series Arthdal Chronicles (2019)
- Saya, a character from the anime Wandering Witch: The Journey of Elaina

== Other uses ==
- Saaya (novel), 2014 Nepali novel by Subin Bhattarai, sequel to Summer Love
- Saya (scabbard) (鞘), the Japanese term for a scabbard
- Saya (folklore), a summer feast and festival Turkic and Altai folklore
- Saya (poem), the type of poem or song that a Takam-Chi chants while playing a Takam
- Saya (artform), a particular type of music of Bolivia
- Saya language, a Chadic dialect cluster of Nigeria
- Sino-American Youth Ambassadors, a program run by Ameson Education and Cultural Exchange Foundation
- Saya, a traditional long skirt worn in the Philippines as part of the baro't saya

== See also ==
- Saaya (disambiguation)
