= Mochizuki =

- Pronunciation: Mochizuki

Origin
- Origin: Japanese
- Region of origin: Japan

Mochizuki (written: 望月 lit. "wish moon") is a Japanese surname. Notable people with the surname include:

- Ayumu Mochizuki (born 2000), Japanese actor
- Mochizuki Chiyome (c. late 16th century), noblewoman
- Hiroo Mochizuki (born 1936), martial artist
- Hisayo Mochizuki (born 1978), voice actress
- Horace Yomishi Mochizuki (1937–1989), mathematician
- Isamu Mochizuki (1906–1944), flying ace
- Jun Mochizuki, manga artist
- Mochizuki Keisuke (1867–1941), cabinet minister in the Taisho and early Showa periods
- Masaaki Mochizuki (born 1970), professional wrestler
- Minetarō Mochizuki (born 1961), manga artist
- Minoru Mochizuki (1907–2003), martial artist
- Noriko Mochizuki (望月 のり子; born 1967), Japanese gymnast
- Reo Mochizuki (望月 嶺臣; born 1995), Japanese footballer
- Rokurō Mochizuki (born 1957), film director
- Saya Mochizuki (born 1976), model
- Shigeyoshi Mochizuki (born 1973), association football player
- Shinichi Mochizuki (born 1969), mathematician
- Shintaro Mochizuki (born 2003), tennis player
- Shizuo Mochizuki (望月 倭夫; 1909–?), Japanese pole vaulter
- Susumu Mochizuki (born 1978), professional wrestler
- Takurō Mochizuki (born 1972), mathematician
- Tatsuya Mochizuki (born 1963), association football player
- Tomomi Mochizuki (born 1958), anime director and producer
- Yūta Mochizuki (望月 祐多; born 1967), Japanese actor and voice actor

== Fictional characters ==
- Mochizuki Honami, a character in the game Hatsune Miku: Colorful Stage!
- Mochizuki Rokurō, member of the Sanada Ten Braves
- Sokaku Mochizuki, from the Fatal Fury series
- Mochizuki Minato from Tsukipro
- Mochizuki Tōuya, the protagonist of In Another World with My Smartphone
- Mochizuki Ryoji, a character in the game Persona 3

== See also ==
- Mochizuki school of Japanese painting, founded by Mochizuki Gyokusen I
- Mochizuki-shuku
- Mochizuki, Nagano
- Mochizuki, destroyer
