= Summer Love =

Summer Love may refer to:

== Film and TV ==
- Summer Love (1958 film), an American black-and-white musical comedy film
- Summer Love (2001 film), a Turkish drama film
- Summer Love (2006 film), a Polish western written and directed by Piotr Uklański
- Summer Love (2019 film), a Nepalese romance drama film
- Summer Love (TV series), a 2022 Australian TV anthology series
- Summer Love (web series), a 2019 Pakistan Urdu-language coming-of-age drama web series

== Music ==
- "Summer Love" (The Fooo Conspiracy song) (2016)
- "Summer Love" (Justin Timberlake song), 2007
- "Summer Love" (Sherbet song), 1975
- "Summer Love", a 1957 song by Joni James
- "Summer Love", a 1959 song by Felicia Sanders
- "Summer Love", a 2012 song by Guy Sebastian from Armageddon
- "Summer Love", a 2012 song by One Direction from Take Me Home
- "Summer Love", a 2018 song by Rita Ora from Phoenix
- "Summer Love", a 2020 song by Carly Rae Jepsen from Dedicated Side B

== Other ==
- Summer Love (novel), a 2012 Nepali novel by Subin Bhattarai
- Brides in Love, the Charlton Comics series retitled Summer Love for its final three issues

== See also ==
- Summer of Love (disambiguation)
- Summertime Love (disambiguation)
- The Love of Summer: The Performance, a 2019 performance by Hyungwon
- "My Summer Love", a 1963 hit by Ruby & the Romantics
- Summer Love Love, a 2011 Hong Kong romcom film
- Summer Lovers, a 1982 American film
