= AYC =

AYC is an acronym for any of the following articles:

- African Youth Charter
- All Youth Channels
- American Youth Congress
- Adventist Youth Conference
- Active Yaw Control, Mitsubishi Motors' automotive technology
- Ameson Year in China, a program run by Ameson Education and Cultural Exchange Foundation
- Am Yisrael Chai
