= Summer Lovin' =

Summer Lovin' or Summer Loving may refer to:

- Summer Lovin' (song), a single by house music duo Musikk
- Summer Lovin' (Modern Family), the season premiere of the seventh season of the American sitcom Modern Family
- Summer Loving (Shameless), the second episode of season 2 of American television comedy-drama series Shameless
- Summer Nights (Grease song), a song from the musical Grease

== See also ==
- Summer Love (disambiguation)
- Summer of Love (disambiguation)
