= Saaya =

Saaya may refer to:

- Saaya (1989 film), an Indian Hindi-language romantic thriller film by Keshu Ramsay, starring Shatrughan Sinha and Poonam Dhillon
- Saaya (2003 film), an Indian Hindi-language supernatural thriller film by Anurag Basu, starring John Abraham and Tara Sharma
- Saaya (Indian TV series), a 1998 Indian television soap opera on Sony TV
- Saaya (Pakistani TV series), a 2018 Pakistani horror television series
- Saaya (novel), 2014 Nepali novel
- Saaya Irie, Japanese actress and singer
- Saaya Yamabuki (山吹 沙綾), a minor character in the Japanese TV series Shugo Chara!
- Saaya Yamabuki (山吹 沙綾), a character in the series BanG Dream!
- Saaya Agata (安形 紗綾), a character in the anime and manga series Sket Dance
- Saaya Yakushiji (薬師寺 さあや), a character in the anime Hugtto! PreCure

== See also ==
- Saya (disambiguation)
