= SAIA =

Saia or SAIA may refer to:

== Organisations ==
- Saia (Nasdaq: SAIA), an American trucking company
- South African Institute of Architects, a professional association formed in 1996
- South Australian Institute of Architects, a predecessor of the Australian Institute of Architects
- Space Accident Investigation Authority of the United Kingdom

== Places ==
- Saia, Estonia, a village in Saaremaa Parish
- Saia Maior, a civitas of the Roman Empire, possibly located in modern-day Tunisia

== People with the given name ==
- Saia Makisi (born 1981), Tongan rugby league footballer
- Saia Fainga'a (born 1987), Australian rugby union footballer
- Saia Piukala (fl. 2014–2019), Tongan politician

== People with the surname ==
- Jorge Zontal (born Slobodan Saia-Levy; 1944–1994), Canadian artist
- Jim Saia (born 1964), American basketball coach
- Louis Saia (1950–2026), Canadian writer and film director

== See also ==
- Saya (disambiguation)
