= Summer Love (2019 film) =

- Nepali: समर लभ
- Directed by: Muskan Dhakal
- Screenplay by: Samipya Raj Timlisina
- Story by: Subin Bhattarai
- Based on: Summer Love by Subin Bhattarai
- Produced by: Khagendra Shrestha; Indu Bhandari
- Starring: Ashish Piya; Rewati Chetri; Suraj Singh Thakuri; Namrata Sapkota
- Edited by: Arjun G.C.
- Release date: 8 February 2019 (Nepal)
- Country: Nepal
- Language: Nepali

Summer Love (Nepali: समर लभ) is a 2019 Nepalese romance drama film, based on Subin Bhattarai's novel Summer Love (2012). The film is directed by Muskan Dhakal, produced by Khagendra Shrestha, Indu Bhandari, written by Subin Bhattarai. The film stars Ashish Piya and Rewati Chetri in the lead roles alongside Suraj Singh Thakuri and Namrata Sapkota.

The film was released on 8 February 2019.

== Plot ==
Film is based on Subin Bhattarai's Summer Love.

== Cast ==
- Ashish Piya as Aatit
- Rewati Chetri as Saya
- Suraj Singh Thakuri
- Namrata Sapkota

== Awards ==
Year	Award	Category	Recipient	Result	Ref(s)
2020	National Film Awards	Best Cinematographer	Sanjay Lama	Won	
2020	National Film Awards	Best Editor	Nimesh Shrestha	Won	
2019	Dcine Awards	Best Actor in a Supporting Role (Female)	Namrata Sapkota	Won	
2019	Dcine Awards	Best Debut Actor (Male)	Ashish Piya	Nominated	
2019	Dcine Awards	Best Debut Actor (Female)	Rewati Chetri	Nominated	
2019	Dcine Awards	Best Cinematographer	Sanjay Lama	Nominated	
2019	Dcine Awards	Best Editor	Arjun G.C.	Nominated	
2019	Dcine Awards	Best Sound Mixing	Mukesh Shah	Nominated	
2019	Dcine Awards	Best Background Score	Alish Karki	Nominated	
