= Summertime Love (disambiguation) =

"Boys (Summertime Love)" is a 1987 song by Italian singer Sabrina.

Summertime Love or Summer Time Love may also refer to:

== Songs ==
- "Summertime Love", a 1960 song from the stage musical Greenwillow
- "Summertime Love", a 1960 song by Roy Head and The Traits
- "Summertime Love", a 1963 song by The Fontane Sisters off the album Tips of My Fingers
- "Summertime Love", a 1966 song by Harry Belafonte off the album In My Quiet Room
- "Summertime Love", a 1968 song by The New Christy Minstrels off the single record "Alice's Restaurant"
- "Summertime Love", a 1985 song vy Ta Mara and the Seen off their eponymous album Ta Mara & the Seen (album)
- "Summer Time Love", a 2006 song by M-Flo
- "Summer Time Love", a 2007 single by Exile (Japanese band)
- "Summertime Love", a 2011 song by Kalin and Myles
- "Summertime Love", a 2012 single by Damidamon
- "Summertime Love", a 2014 song and single by Ming Bridges off the album Morphosis
- "Summertime Love", a 2015 song by Flatland Cavalry off the EP record Come May
- "Summer Time Love", a 2016 single by Juan Karlos Labajo off the album JK
- "Summertime Love", a 2018 song and single by Vanness Wu
- "Summertime Love" (Digital Farm Animals song), 2019 single by Digital Farm Animals
- "Summertime Love", a 2019 song and single by Lyrica Garrett off the album Ready

== Other uses ==
- Summertime Love, a 1959 book of music by Frank Loesser
- Summertime Love, a Bill T Award-nominated 2017 comedy show by New Zealand comedian Paul Williams (comedian) (born 1992)

== See also ==
- Summer of Love (disambiguation)
- Summer Love (disambiguation)
