= Ameson Education and Cultural Exchange Foundation =

Non-profit, non-governmental organization

- Founded: 2012; Washington, DC
- Type: Non-profit, Non-governmental organization
- Purpose: Education and cultural exchange
- Headquarters: Ronald Reagan Building and International Trade Center in Washington, D.C., United States (former)
- Board of directors: Stephen Smith, Zhu Xiao Di

The Ameson Education and Cultural Exchange Foundation (Chinese Simplified: 安生文教交流基金会; Pinyin: ānshēng wénjiào jiāoliú jījīnhuì) is a 501(c)(3) non-profit, non-governmental organization committed to the promotion and implementation of programs which facilitate cultural exchange and educational cooperation worldwide. Ameson's honorary Chairman is the late Dr. Boutros Boutros Ghali, a former Secretary General of the United Nations.

In China, the foundation collaborates with Ambright Education Group to promote international cultural and educational exchanges.

== Background ==
The Ameson Education and Cultural Exchange Foundation was founded in 1994 in New York City with the intention of establishing partnerships with leading universities, language institutions, higher education authorities, governmental and non-governmental organizations around the world. With offices in the World Trade Center, the Foundation sought to promote dialogue between nations in the host city of the United Nations. From 2001 to 2002, the late Dr. Boutros Boutros-Ghali, honorary chairman of Ameson Foundation, attended events throughout eastern China to promote cultural exchange. Ever since, the Ameson Foundation has established programs that facilitate cultural exchange and educational cooperation by bridging nations and bringing dialogue to people worldwide, including Ameson Chinese Elite, Professional Pathways Program, Ameson Year in China fand Sino-American Youth Ambassadors program. On September 11th, 2001, Ameson's offices in the World Trade Center were destroyed and the organization did not continue. In 2012, Ameson re-opened its headquarters in the Ronald Reagan Building and International Trade Center located in Washington, D.C., and received 501(c)(3) status. Subsequently, Ameson moved out, and those offices are now vacant.

== Programs ==
The Ameson Foundation works to further education and cultural exchange through the following programs including:

=== Ameson Chinese Elite ===
The Ameson Chinese Elite is the first China-wide program dedicated to providing a formative cross-cultural experience to top performing student representatives from the five permanent member states of the United Nations Security Council, including China, the United Kingdom, France, Russia, and the United States. This program was discontinued and is no longer regularly administered.

=== Ameson Year in China ===
Ameson Year in China program recruits US passport holding college graduates to become Educational Ambassadors by spending a year teaching at public schools in coastal China. Ameson acts as a third party to recruit these graduates for English teacher positions in Chinese schools. Participants are not employed by Ameson and sign a contract only with the Chinese school.

=== Professional Pathways Program ===
The Professional Pathways Program provides opportunities for Chinese students at universities in the United States to connect with mentors, attend presentations by successful professionals, and navigate the job market as they begin their careers in the United States or abroad.

=== Sino-American Youth Ambassadors ===
Sino-American Youth Ambassadors is designed to bring greater international awareness and cultural diversity to high school campuses, with students serving as cultural ambassadors in both countries.

== Offices ==
Ameson's headquarters is located in Washington, D.C., and it maintains regional operations centers in Atlanta, Georgia, Seattle, Washington, New York, New York, and San Francisco, California.
