= Suraj Singh Thakuri =

Nepalese actor

- सुरज सिंह ठकुरी
- Born: Kathmandu
- Presenting career
- Show: Its My Show with Suraj Singh Thakuri
- Network: Kantipur Television
- Country: Nepal
- Previous shows: Call Kantipur; Ghum Gham With Bhushan Dahal; Pariwartan

Suraj Singh Thakuri (Nepali: सुरज सिंह ठकुरी) is a Nepalese actor and television presenter and also known for media executive who is the COO of Kantipur Television Network.

== Education ==
Suraj attended Adarsha Vidya Mandir, Lalitpur, Nepal and completed college at Xavier Academy science college (NEF). He has a master's degree in Environmental Science.

== Professional career ==
Thakuri was the host of the Nepali television talk show Call Kantipur from its inception in 2003 until 2013. Subsequently, he presented the shows Ghumgam and the late-night show It's My Show. He became the chief executive producer of Kantipur TV in 2021, and the company's COO in 2025.

He has also directed and appeared in music videos.

Thakuri received the presidential award Prabal Jana Sewa Shree in 2021.

== Filmography ==
SN	Year	Film	Role	Director	Reference
1	2013	Karkash	Cast	Asim Shah	
2	2014	Nai Nabhannu La 2	Cast	Bikash Raj Acharya	
3	2015	Nai Nabhannu La 3	Cast	Bikash Raj Acharya	
4	2016	Junge	Cast	Utshav Thapa	
5	2019	Summer Love	Cast	Muskan Dhakal	
6	2026	Eklo-I	Cast	Pradeep Shahi	
