= Subin Bhattarai =

Nepali writer (born 1982)

- सुबिन भट्टराई
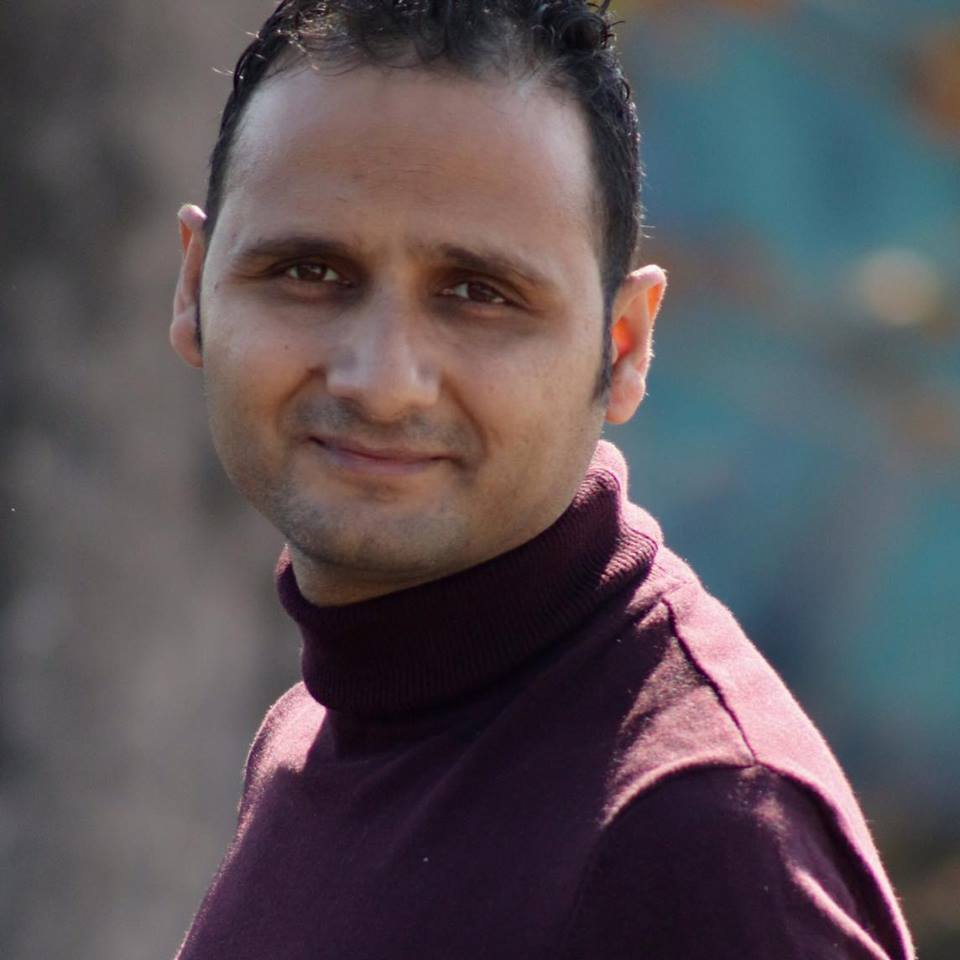
- Born: 5 November 1982 (age 43); Khotang, Nepal
- Occupations: Writer, columnist, teacher
- Notable work: Summer Love (2013); Saaya (2014)
- Spouse: Muna Bartaula
- Website: subinbhattarai.com

Subin Bhattarai (born 5 November 1982) is a Nepalese writer and columnist, known for his novels such as Summer Love and Saaya.

== Early life and education ==
Bhattarai was born in Khotang district in the eastern region of Nepal. His father was a government official and mother, a housewife. A year after his birth, his parent moved to Kathmandu, where he grew up. He received a master's degree in Environmental Science from Tribhuvan University in 2005. He names B.P Koirala, Parijat, Dhruba Chandra Gautam and Dha. Cha. Gotame as some of his favourite writers.

== Writing career ==
He acted several dramas as child artist and co-hosted the popular children's program Hatemalo on Radio Nepal. He published his first book Kathaki Paatra, a collection of short stories, in 2011

His second book a romance novel titled Summer Love, published at the end of 2012 became a commercial success. The book is about college students at the Central Department of Environmental Science at Tribhuwan University falling in love. It became a best selling book in Nepal with in excess of 100,000 copies sold. Its success made Bhattarai popular among youths. In 2019, the novel was adapted into a movie, of same name, by Muskan Dhakal. The English translation of the novel was published on 15 August 2015. The novel was translated by Pratima Sharma.

After a year and a half, in August 2014, Saaya, the sequel to Summer Love was published. The book was released by actresses Garima Panta and Keki Adhikari, with Bhattarai himself at the premises of Nepal Academy, in the premises of hundreds of readers. It too became a best selling book in Nepal, was reprinted in the same month it was released, and was one of the best-selling books in the country for the year.

Bhattarai's fourth book, Monsoon, a romance novel was published on 24 September 2016.

In 2018, he published his fourth book, a novel titled Priye Sufi. In Priye Sufi, the story is narrated from the perspective of an older sister and how she overcomes her depression and her rare medical condition with love and care from her sister and father, but most importantly self-love.

In 2022, he published his sixth book, a romance novel titled Ijoriya. The novel is set in the Maithili speaking region of Mithila. The book was published on the premises of Nepal Academy in the presence of Bhattarai's peers and readers.

== Notable works ==
Year	Book	Genre
2011	Kathaki Paatra	Short story collection
2012	Summer Love	Romance novel
2014	Saaya	Romance novel
2016	Monsoon	Romance novel
2018	Priya Sufi	Romance novel
2022	Ijoriya	Romance novel
