= Ameson Year in China =

Program run by Ameson Education and Cultural Exchange Foundation

- 美国青年教学使者
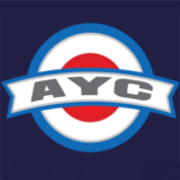
- Abbreviation: AYC
- Founded: 2012
- Headquarters: Washington, D.C.
- Location(s): People's Republic of China and United States
- Parent organization: Ameson Education and Cultural Exchange Foundation
- Website: Official website

Ameson Year in China (AYC) (Chinese Simplified: 美国青年教学使者; Pinyin: měiguó qīngnián jiàoxué shǐzhě) is a program offering opportunities for college graduates to become Educational Ambassadors by spending a year teaching and learning at public schools across China.

== Program ==
Ameson Year in China is a program for college graduates to provide future career awareness by spending one academic year by teaching and studying in an assigned site across China. Each week, AYC participants spend twenty hours teaching, ten hours in the office or in support of students' activities, and ten hours in collaborative or self-directed pursuits, such as language learning, exploration, and community engagement.

== Background ==
In recent decades the Ameson Education and Cultural Exchange Foundation saw the importance of maintaining positive U.S.-China relations, and believed that dialogue and exchange could support lasting stability between the two countries. The organization sought future leaders to fulfill that mission through its Ameson Year in China (AYC) program.
