= Organisation of African Youth =

Umbrella movement of all youth in Africa

Organisation of African Youth (OAYouth) is the umbrella movement of all youth in Africa, independent of governments, parties or intergovernmental organisations. It was formed in August 2009 as a direct result of the entry into force of the African Youth Charter, adopted by the general assembly of heads of states of the African Union in 2006. The organisation is legally registered in 11 countries and operates through a charter in many others.

Pursuant to the African Youth Charter, OAYouth identifies youth as African young people of between 15 and 35.

As of 2016, 38 of the 54 AU member states are members of OAYouth.
