= Summer of Love (disambiguation) =

The Summer of Love usually refers to the summer of 1967.

Summer of Love may also refer to:

- Second Summer of Love, the summers of 1988 and 1989 in the UK

== Music ==
- Summer of Love (album), an album by Koda Kumi
- "Summer of Love" (The B-52's song), 1986
- "Summer of Love" (Cascada song), 2012
- "Summer of Love" (Dannii Minogue song), 2015
- "Summer of Love" (Lonyo song), 2000
- "Summer of Love" (Shawn Mendes and Tainy song), 2021
- "Summer of Love" (Steps song), a 2000 double A-side single with "When I Said Goodbye"
- "Summer of Love", a song by Baha Men from Who Let the Dogs Out
- "Summer of Love", a song by Leah Haywood from Leah
- "Summer of Love", a song by U2 from Songs of Experience
- "Summer of Love", a song by The Beach Boys from Summer in Paradise
- "Summer of Love", a single by Throwing Muses from Moonlight Concessions

== Other ==
- Summer of Love (novel), by Lisa Mason
- Summer of Love: The Making of Sgt. Pepper, a 1993 book by George Martin on the making of the 1967 Beatles album
- Summer of Love (audio drama), a British audio drama
- "Summer of Love" (Sliders), an episode of the television program Sliders

== See also ==
- Long, hot summer of 1967, of race riots in the United States coinciding with the 1967 Summer of Love
- George Floyd protests in Seattle
- "Happy Summer of Love" (Japanese: 恋のハッピーサマー, romanized: Koi no Happī Samā), a 2022 episode of Murai in Love
- Summertime Love (disambiguation)
- Summer Love (disambiguation)
