= Japanese destroyer Mochizuki =

Two destroyers of Japan have borne the name Mochizuki:

- Japanese destroyer Mochizuki (1927), a Mutsuki-class destroyer launched in 1927 and sunk in 1943
- JDS Mochizuki, a Takatsuki-class destroyer launched in 1968 and decommissioned in 1999
