= Sino-American Youth Ambassadors =

- 中美青年大使
- Abbreviation: SAYA
- Founded: 2010
- Headquarters: Washington, D.C.
- Location(s): People's Republic of China and United States
- Parent organization: Ameson Education and Cultural Exchange Foundation
- Website: Official website

Sino-American Youth Ambassador (SAYA) (Chinese Simplified: 中美青年大使; Pinyin: zhōngměi qīngnián dàshǐ) is an exchange program run by the Ameson Education and Cultural Exchange Foundation seeking to build capacity for campus internationalization and cultural awareness in school campuses. Currently, SAYA program is open to Chinese and American students who serve as cultural ambassadors in both countries.

== Background ==
The Sino-American Youth Ambassadors (SAYA) program started in 2010 as part of the Ameson Foundation's program with the intention of bringing greater international awareness and cultural diversity in campus with American and Chinese high school students. The SAYA program seeks to build capacity for international education and provide new perspectives on education by exchanging student ambassadors. Each year, SAYA organizes two exchanges: one is American students go abroad in China and the other is Chinese students go abroad in United States. In 2012, approximately 20 American students participated the SAYA program in Beijing No. 4 High School where they learned Chinese language and cultural with SAYA Chinese students and travelled with their Chinese peers. In the return exchange in 2012, SAYA students had an opportunity to meet the U.S. Vice President, Joe Biden and the Chinese current paramount leader, Xi Jinping during the exchange program in Los Angeles. In 2013, approximately 100 Chinese students participated the SAYA program during the Chinese New Year and introduced the Chinese New Year traditions to their American classmates in Belmont High School, Thomas Jefferson High School, and Providence Day School and host families in the community. In return exchanges, students from Branson High School visited Shanghai Gezhi High School, and students from Providence Day School visited Jingling High School’s Hexi campus later in the year 2013.

== Program ==
SAYA programs take place during school holidays. Prior to the exchange, students undergo cultural training to learn about different cultures. During the exchange students immerse themselves in regular classes for a week and travel with their peers for another week. As cultural ambassadors, students share their culture with other students through presentation. After the exchange, students return to their countries and share what they learned with classmates.

SAYA connects American and Chinese high schools interested in cultural exchanges and arranges home-stays for participants. SAYA serves as an intermediary between American and Chinese students to facilitate cultural exchanges in personal level.
