= Damidamon =

DAMIDAMON
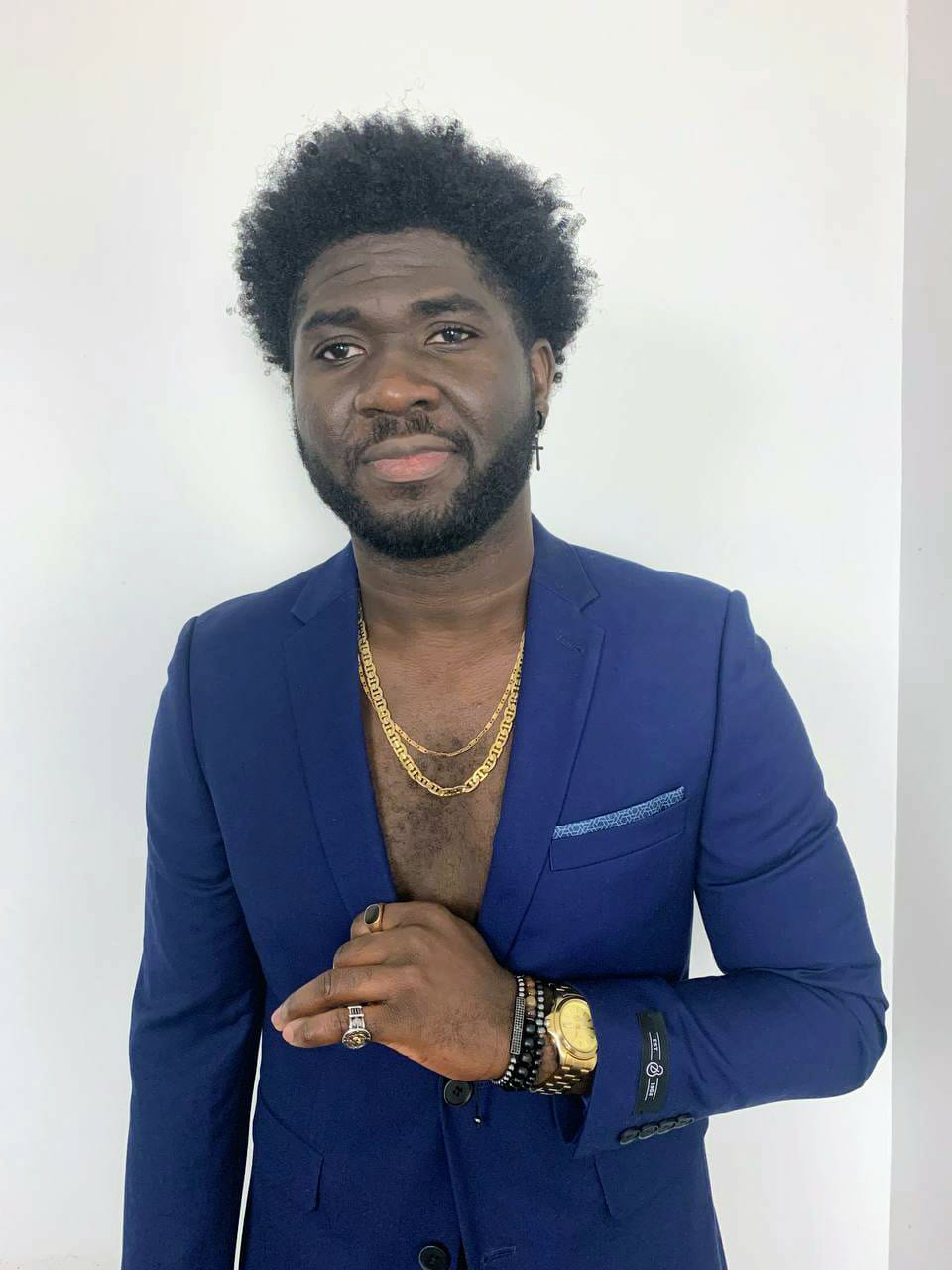

Background information
- Birth name: Dami Joshua Onadeko
- Also known as: Don DADA Of Music
- Born: June 2, 1990 (age 35)
- Genres: Hip-hop, R&B, dance-hall, afrobeat, pop
- Occupation(s): Musician, songwriter, producer
- Years active: 2012-present
- Labels: D Onadeko Records, Albion Entertainment
- Website: www.damidamon.com

Dami Joshua Onadeko, professionally known as DAMIDAMON, is a British-Nigerian recording artist, songwriter, and producer. After his 2012 singles "London City and Summertime Love", he won the "Music Artist of the Year" category at the 2013 Woolwich Stars of Tomorrow Awards UK.

== Awards ==
Year	Award Ceremony	Result
2013	Woolwich Stars Of Tomorrow	WON
2019	Newcastle Underground Talent	Nominated
