= Summer Love (web series) =

Pakistani web series

- Release Poster
- Genre: web series
- Written by: Basit Naqvi
- Directed by: Muhammad Murtaza Alizai
- Creative director: Ziad Azad
- Country of origin: Pakistan
- Original language: Urdu
- No. of seasons: 1
- No. of episodes: 10

Production
- Producer: Umair Wakeel

Original release
- Network: YouTube
- Release: 4 June 2019

Summer Love is a 2019 Pakistan Urdu Language coming-of-age drama web series produced by Cornetto Pakistan. The series follows the life of Nida and Sami who are poles apart. Their worlds collide at an internship, where they initially rub each other the wrong way, but soon find themselves warming up to the other person. The show's distribution rights were acquired by the digital platform Teeli, and it debuted on 4 June 2019.

== Cast ==
- Hadi Bin Arshad as Sami
- Vardah Aziz as Nida
- Babar Jaffri as Kashan
- Amtul Baweja as Sana
- Durr-e-Shehwar as Sara
