= Mochizuki school =

The Mochizuki school of Japanese painting was founded by Mochizuki Gyokusen I in Kyoto, in the early 1700s.

== Mochizuki Gyokusen I (1692–1755) ==
Mochizuki Gyokusen was born in Kyoto in a samurai family. He studied painting under a Tosa school master, Tosa Mitsunari, and later under Kano school teacher, Yamaguchi Sekkei. He first started by "drawing gold or silver lacquers on seal cases", but soon developed his own style, and became known for pictures of landscapes, flowers and birds, and portraits.

His Night Parade of One Hundred Demons can be "a copy of a sixteenth-century handscroll version of the theme" from the Shinjuan temple of the Daitokuji temple complex in Kyoto.

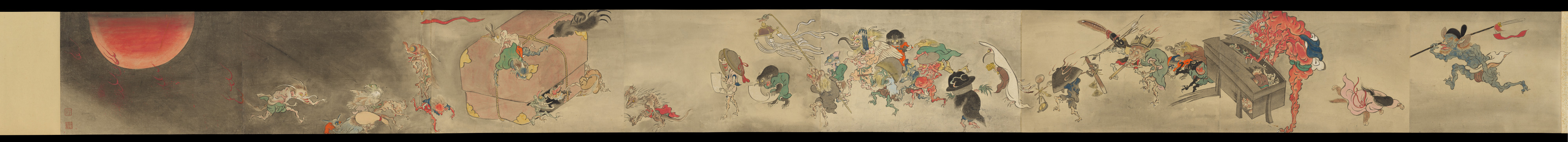
Night Parade of One Hundred Demons

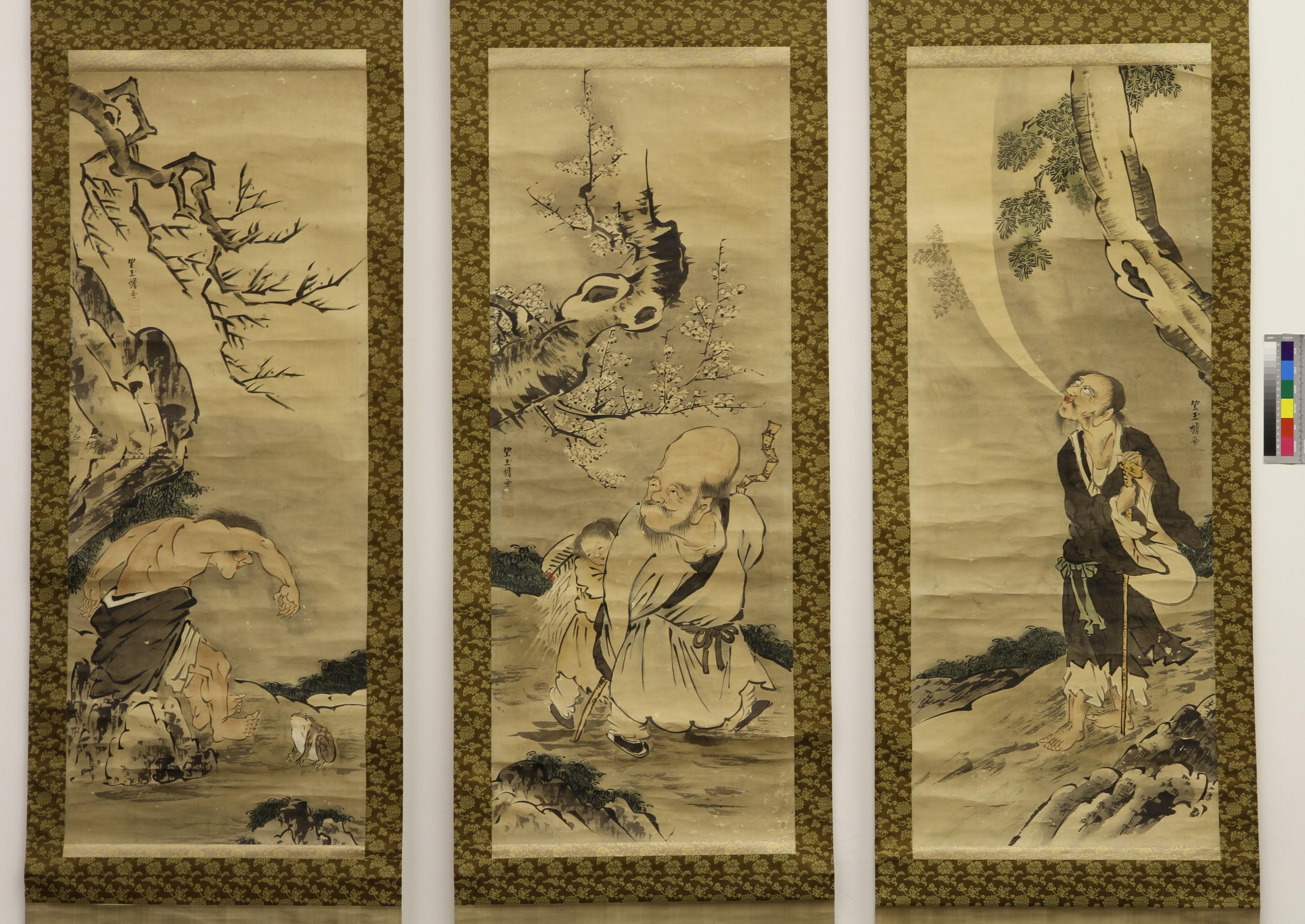
Hanging scroll with Gama Sennin (left), Fukurokuju (centre), and Tekkai Sennin

== Mochizuki Gyokusen II (1744–1795) ==
Mochizuki Gyokusen was the second generation of his family, and used the family name as a signature. Because of that, his works can be mislabeled as the works of his father or son. He was skilled in many techniques, "from sumi ink painting to richly colored painting".

== Mochizuki Gyokusen III (1794–1852) ==
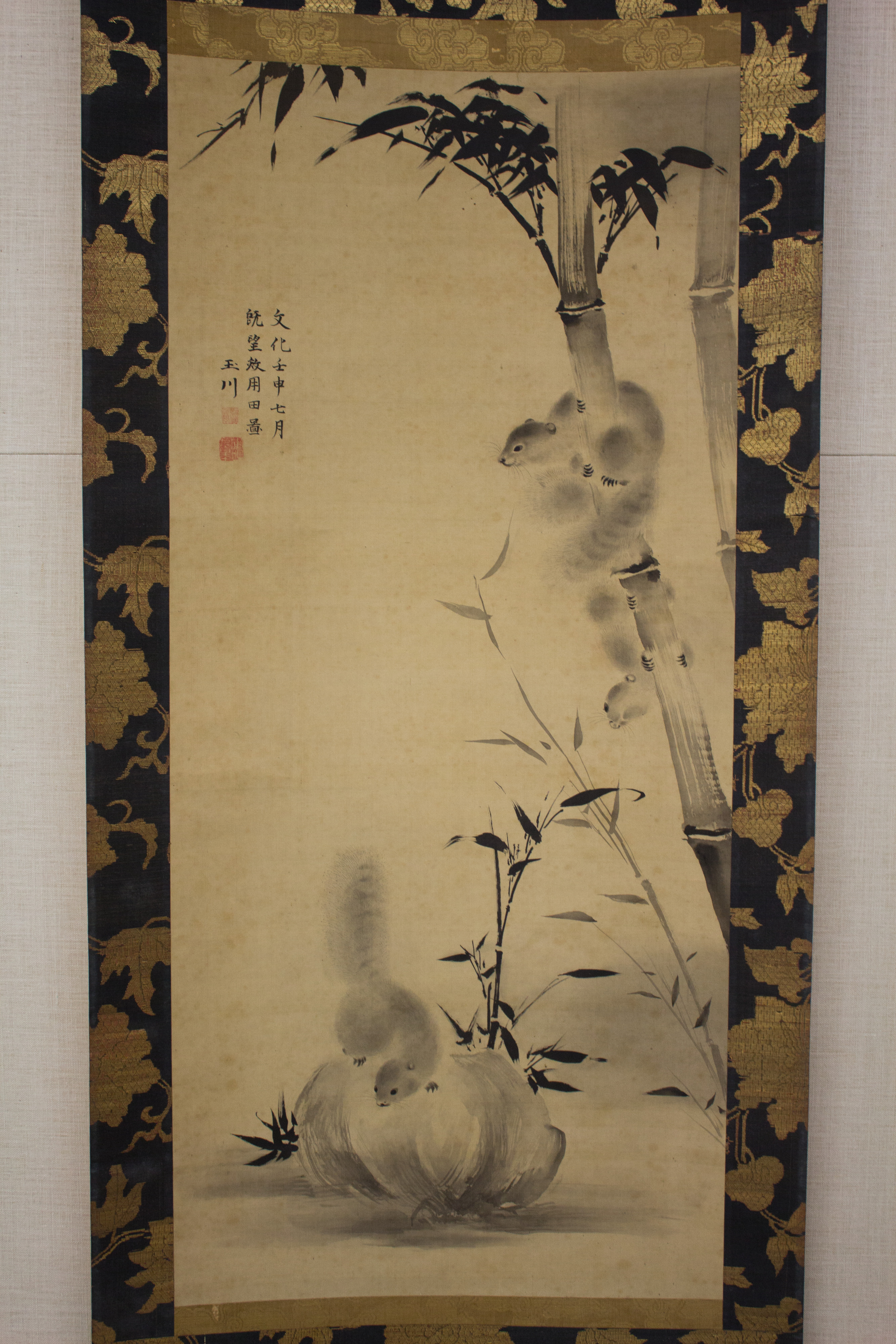
Squirrels on Bamboo and Rock, 1812

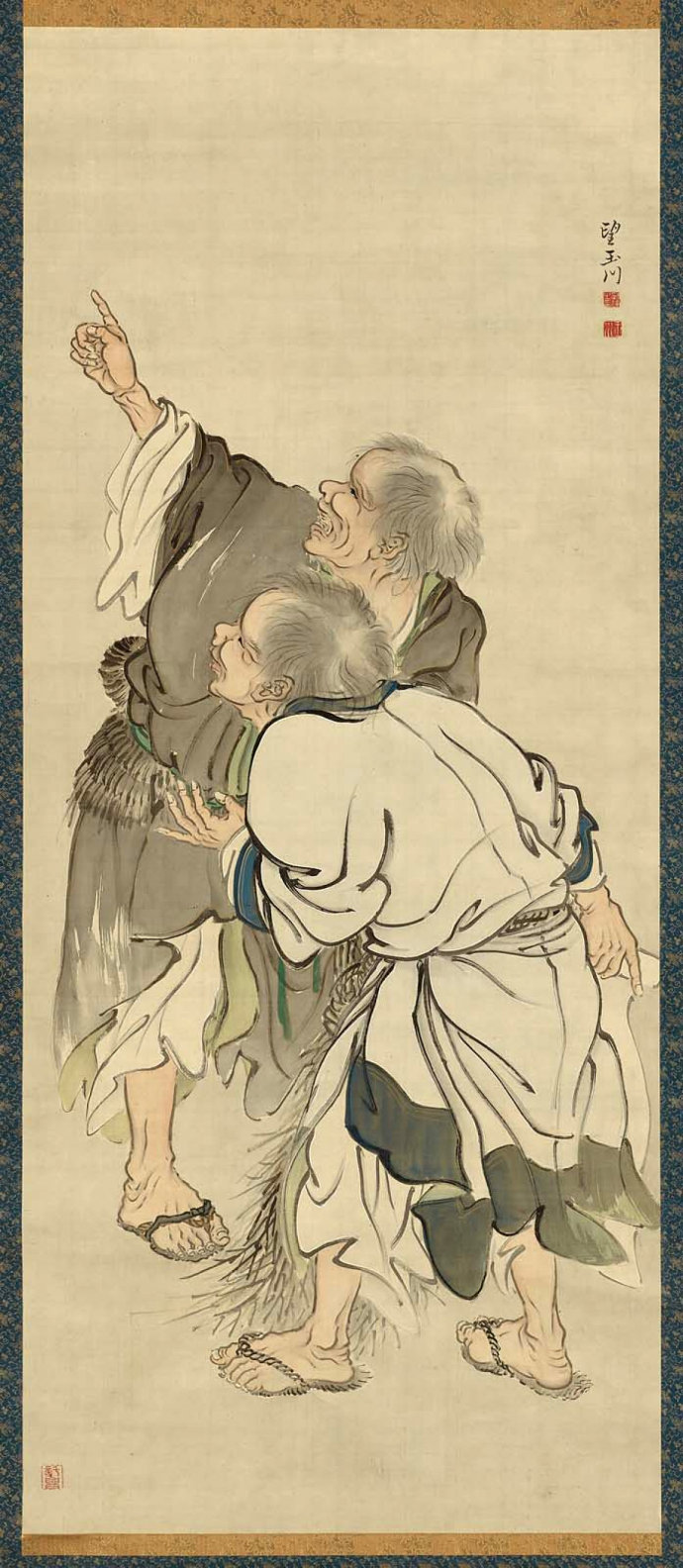

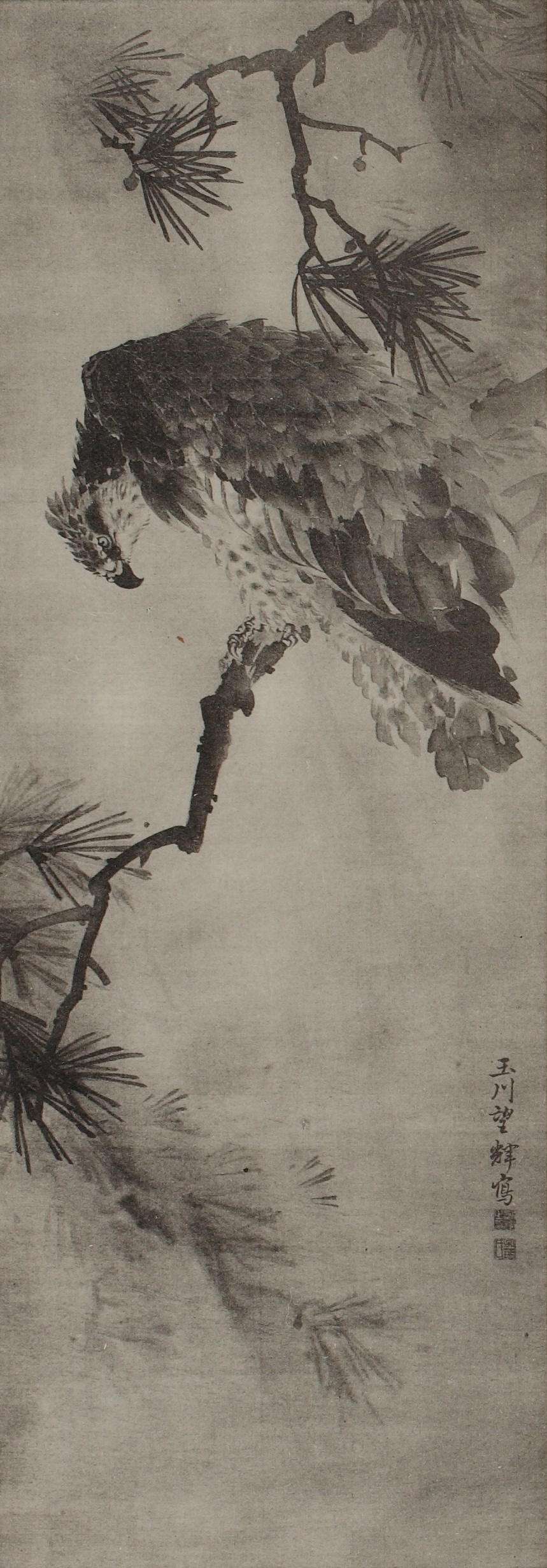

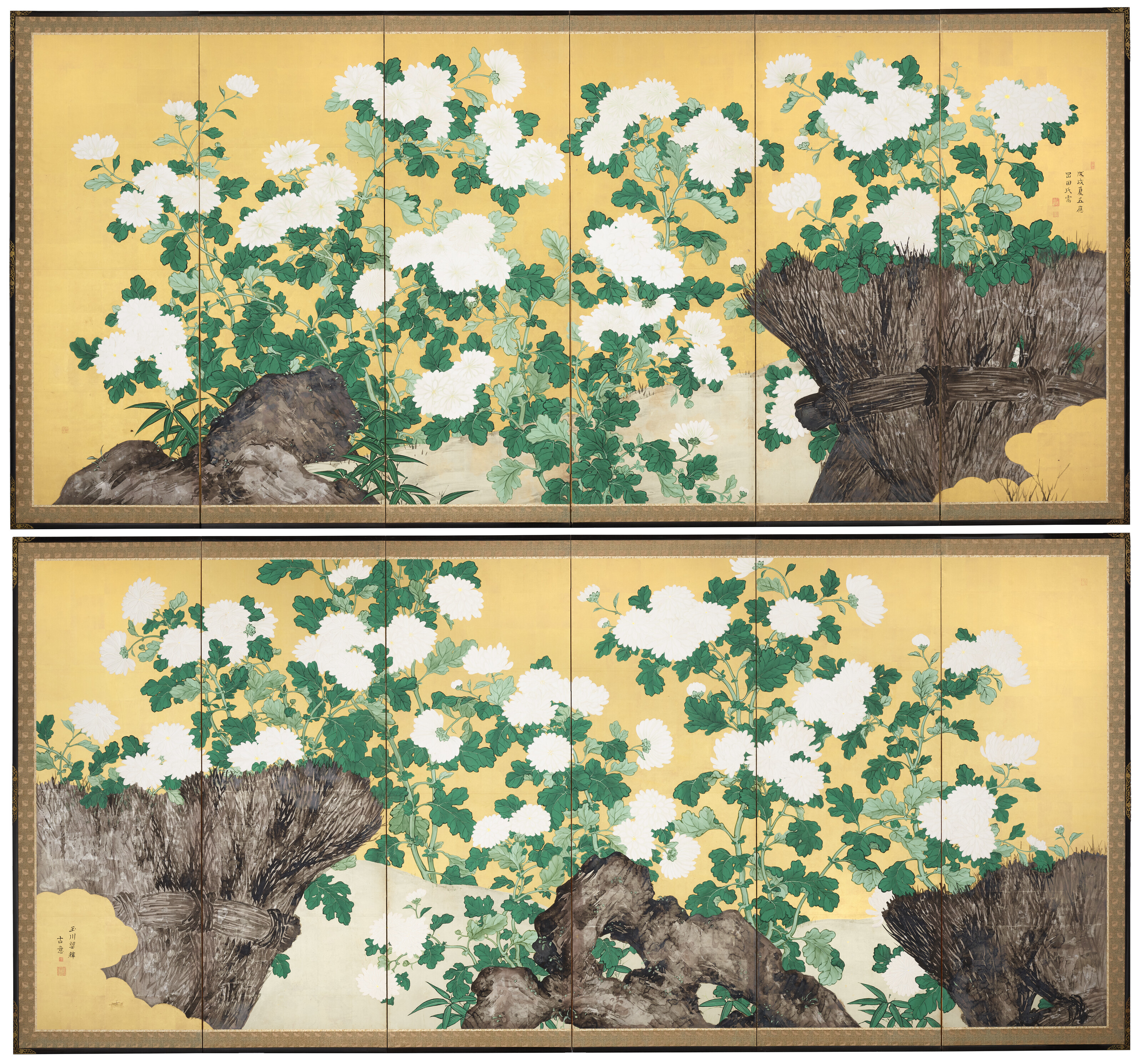
Chrysanthemum and Rock, pair of six-panel screen; ink, color, gofun, gold and silver leaf on paper. 1838.

Mochizuki Gyokusen, the third generation of his clan, worked at Ninomaru Palace of the Kanazawa Castle in his youth, in 1809, under Kishi Ganku. His next teacher was Matsumura Goshun of Shijo School. Alternatively, he could study under Murakami Tōshu and Saeki Ganku. He left Kyoto for Nagasaki and then moved to Edo, to study under Tani Bunchō. His style was greatly influenced by Shijo School.

== Mochizuki Gyokusen IV (1834–1913) ==
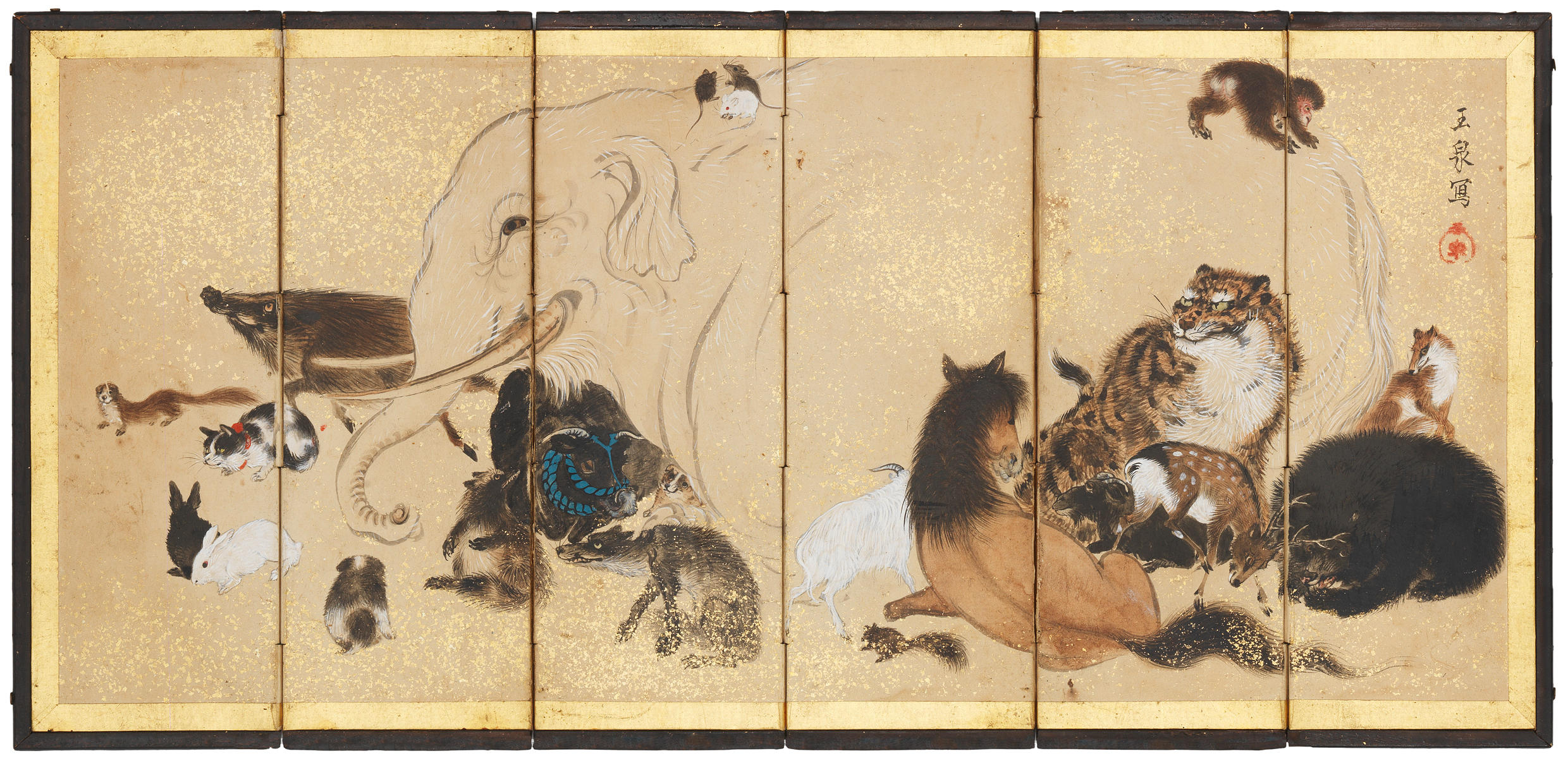

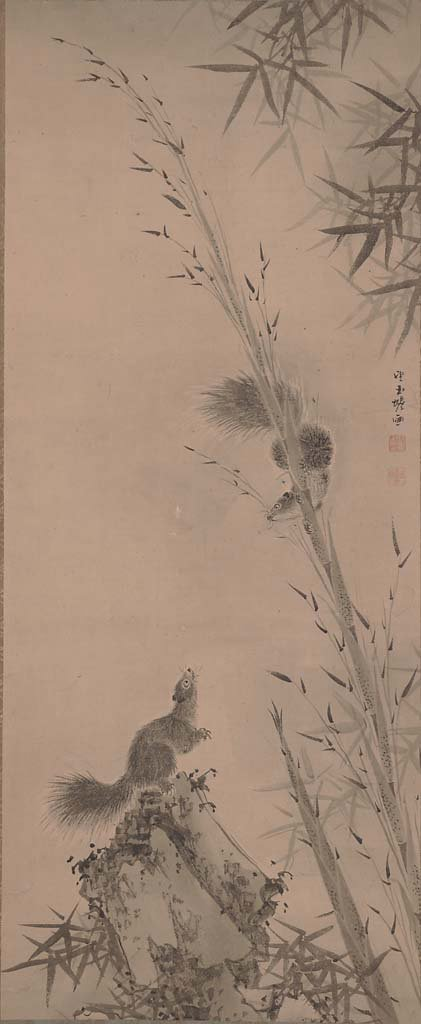

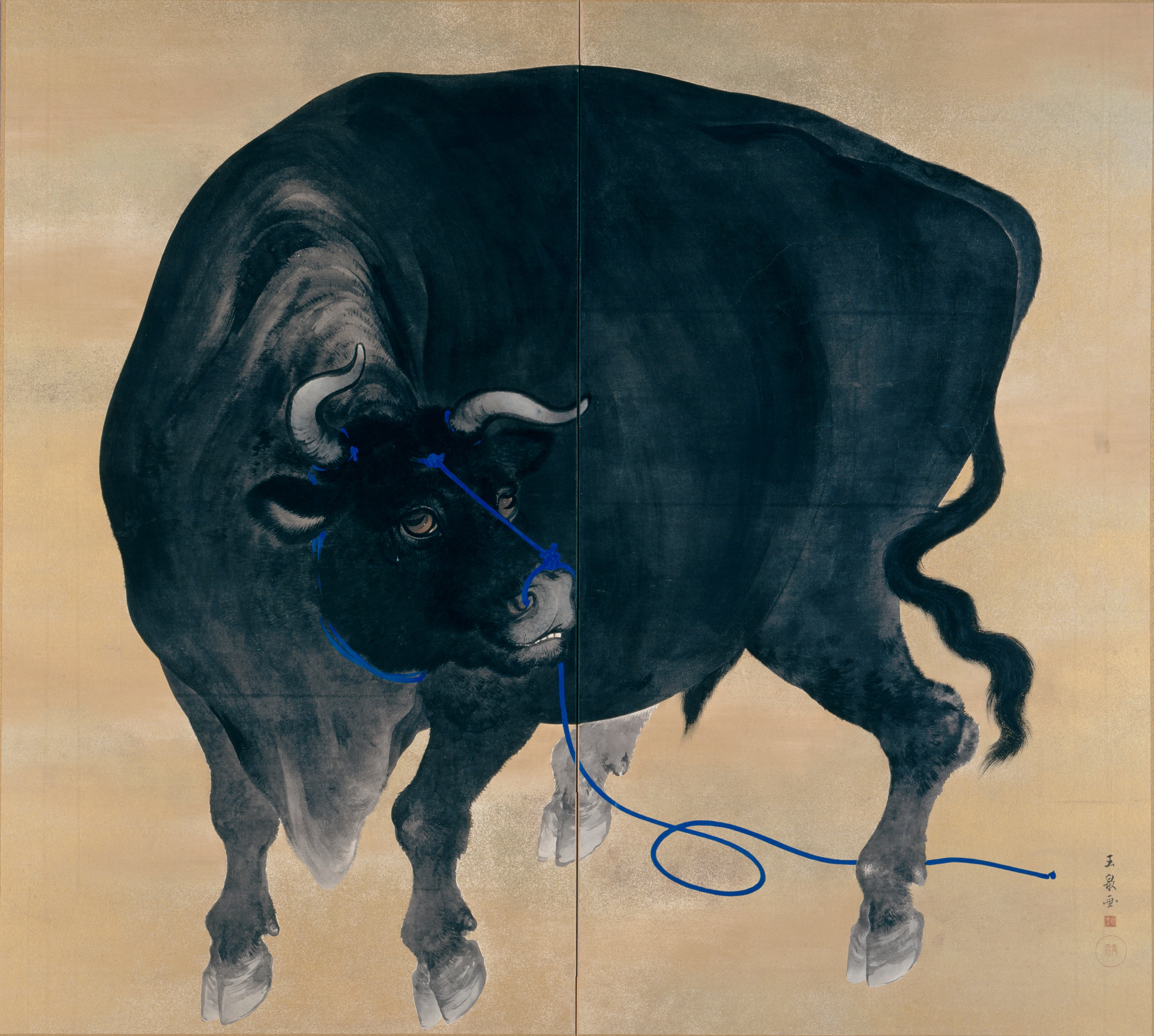

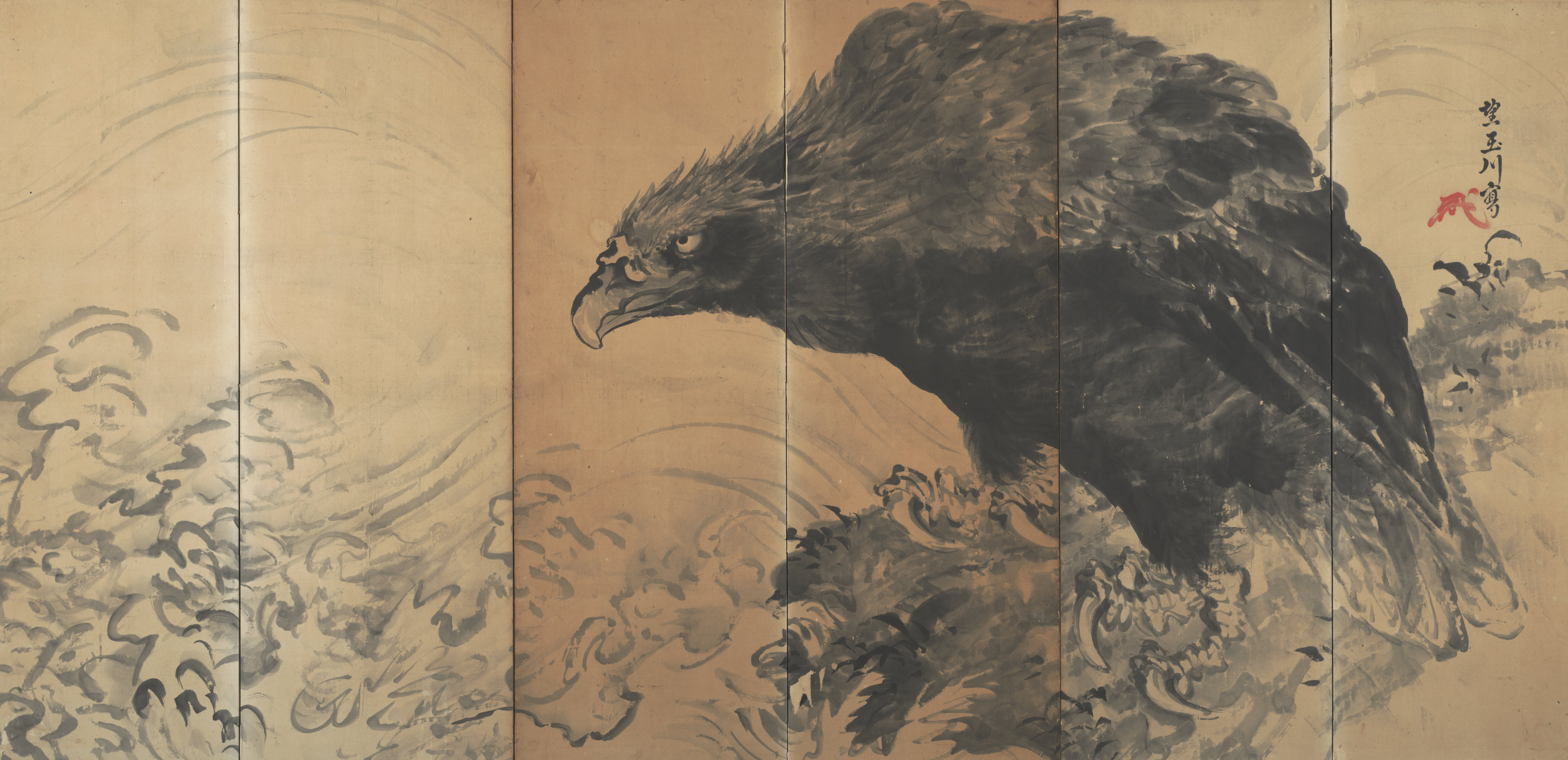

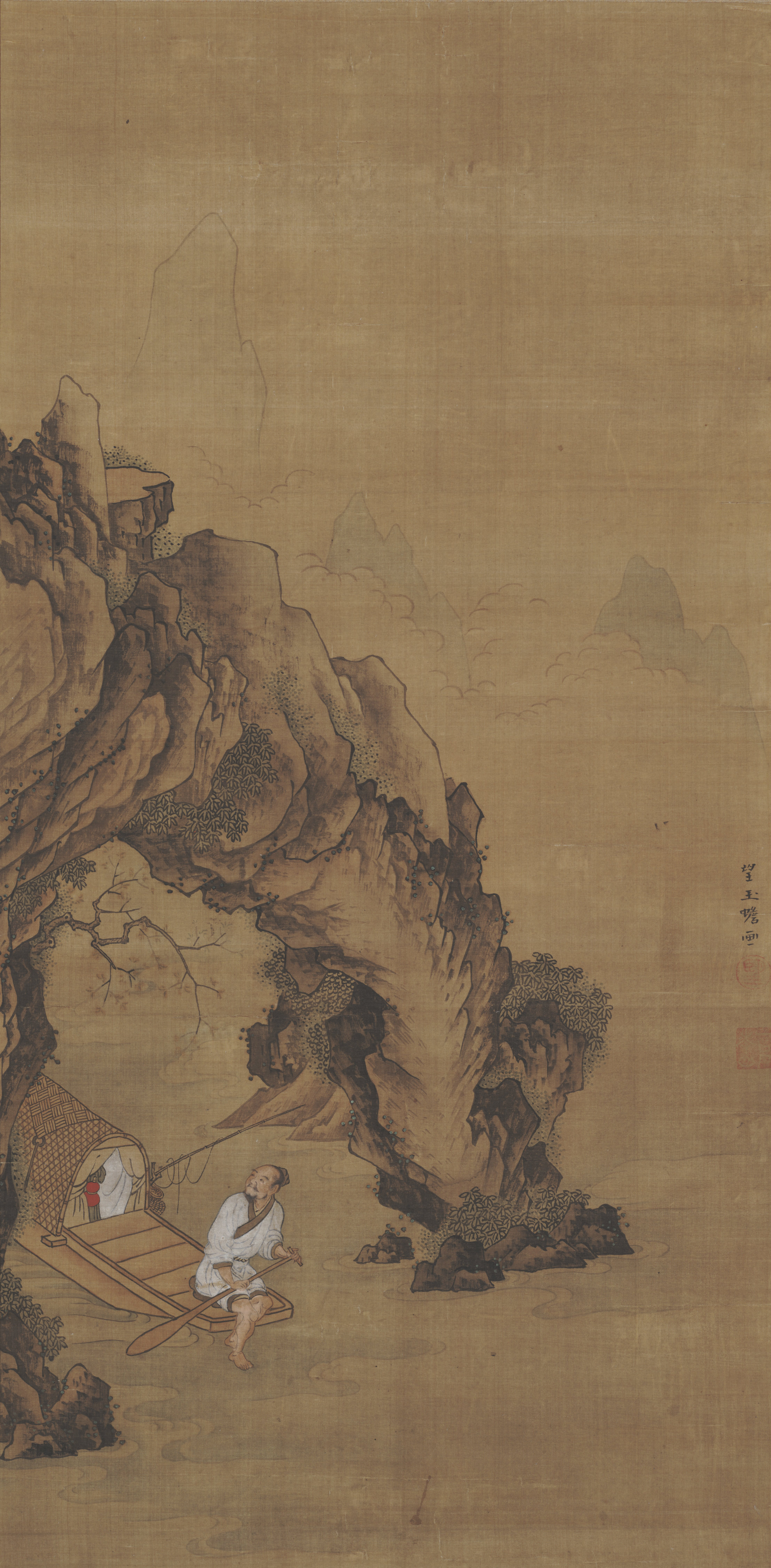

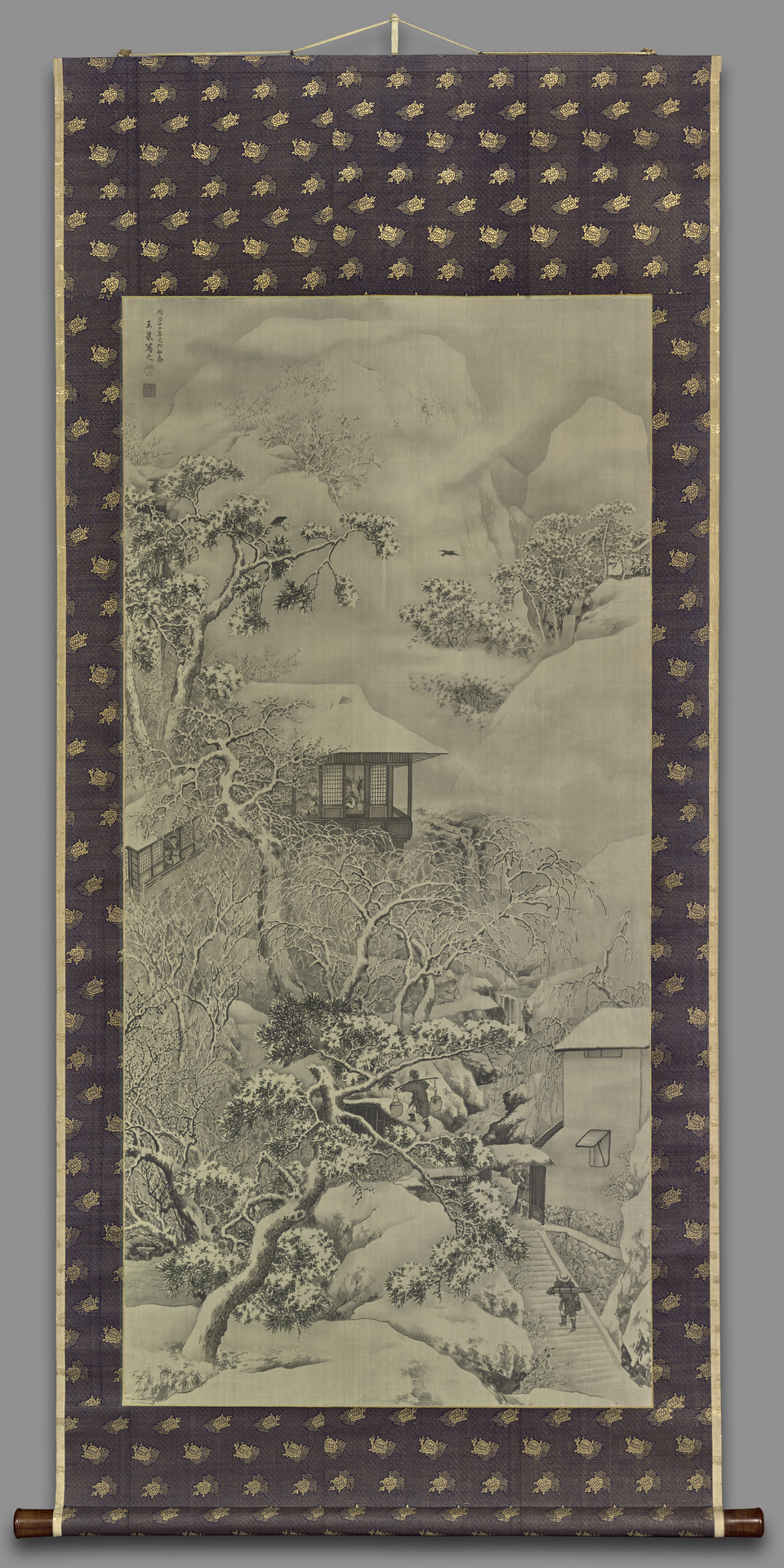

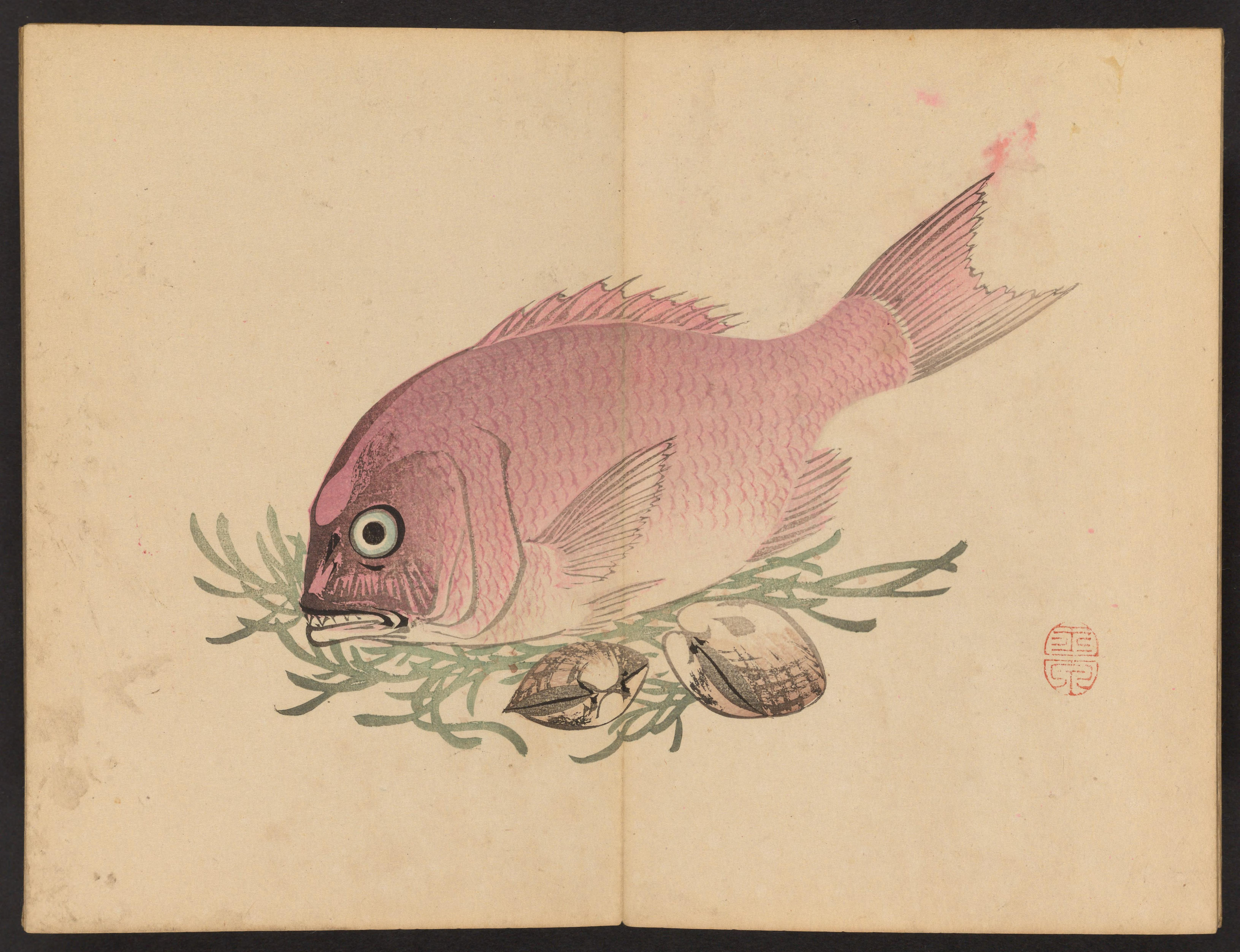

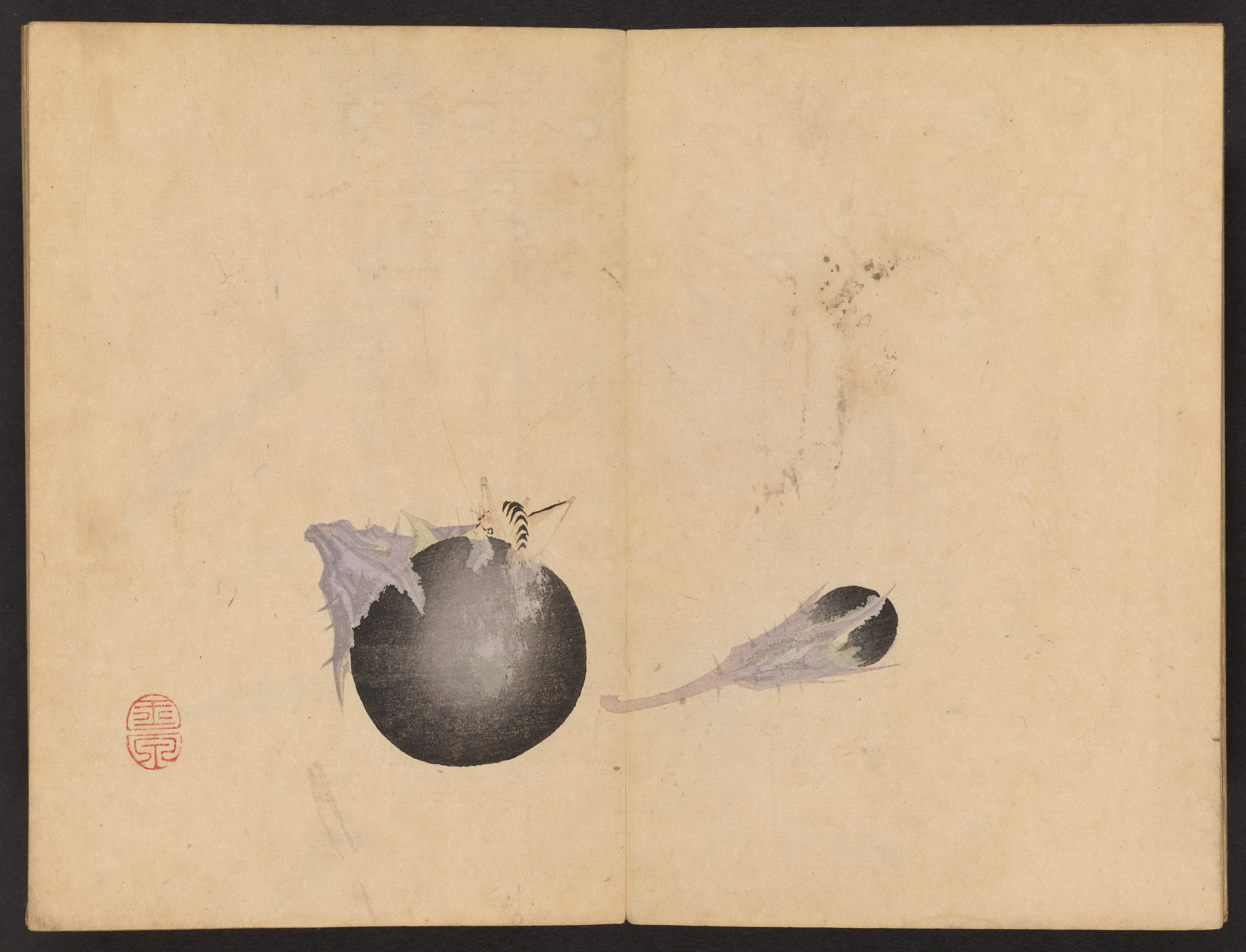

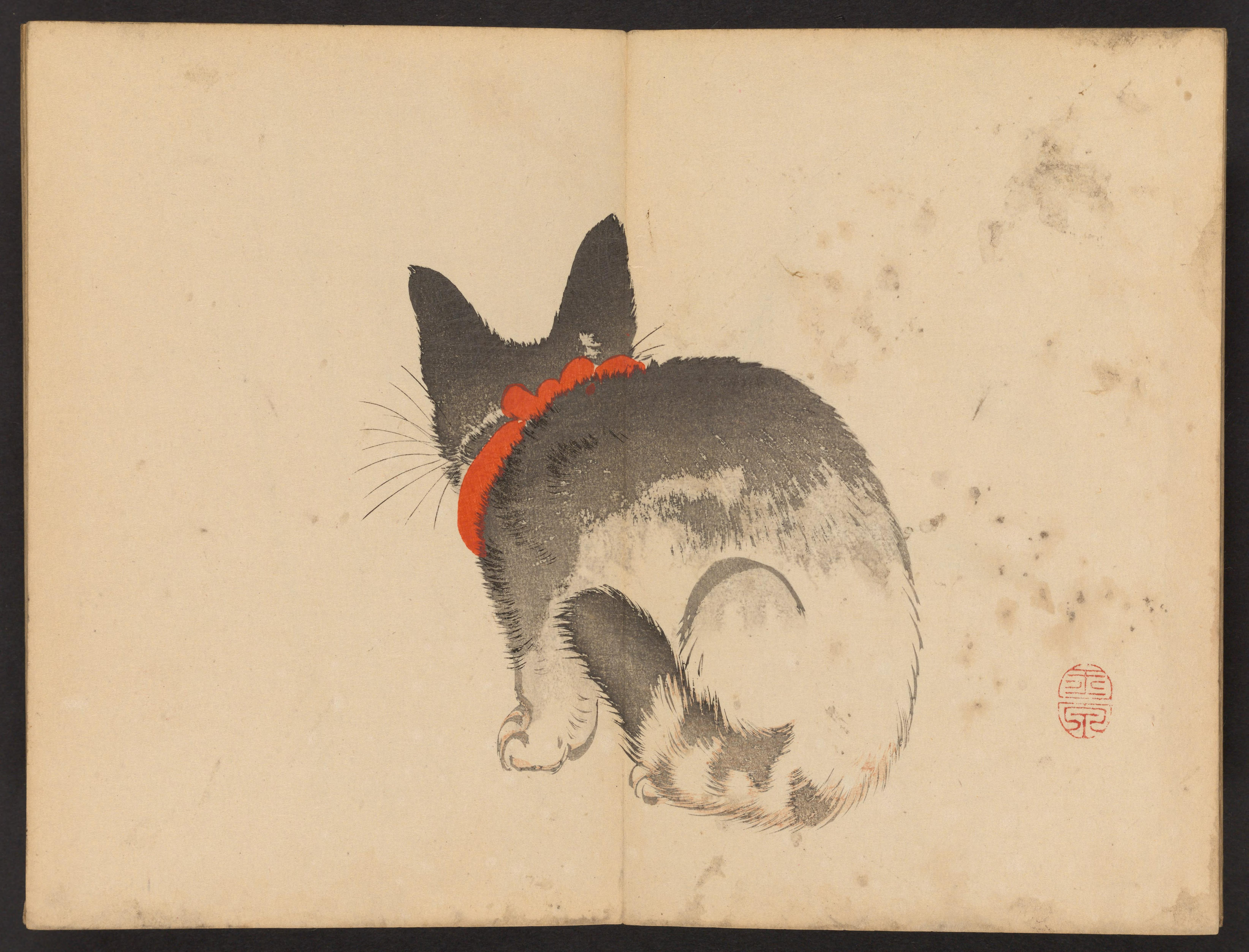

Mochizuki Gyokusen IV studied under his father, and was active during Meiji and Taishō eras. In early twenties, when his father dies, he became the head of the Mochizuki school and an official artist of the imperial family in the Imperial Palace in Edo. However, he spent most of the time in Kyoto, where he founded Kyoto Prefectural School of Painting together with Kono Bairei. He studied the technique of the Maruyama-Shijo School. His style was influenced by nihonga, Western-style realism. Kawai Gyokudō was among his pupils. He is mostly known for his kacho-e, painting of birds and flowers. He became an Imperial Household Artist in 1904.

== Mochizuki Gyokkei (1874–1938) ==
Mochizuki Gyokkei was the fifth-generation artist of his family school, active in Kyoto in Meiji, Taishō and Shōwa eras. He studied under his father, and blended Kishi and Shijō schools styles in his paintings. He won a 2nd-class medal at the First Kaiga Kyōshinkai Exhibition in 1896. He was known for kachō-ga paintings. He decorated the garden pavilion of the Heian Shrine in Kyoto.

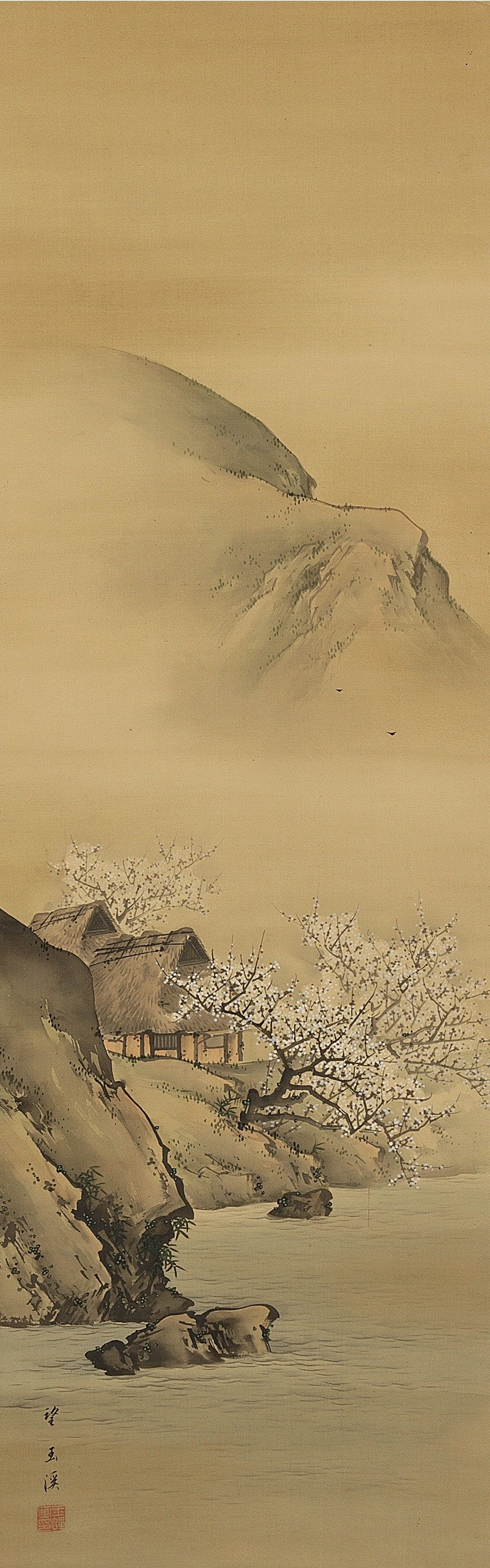
Spring Landscape

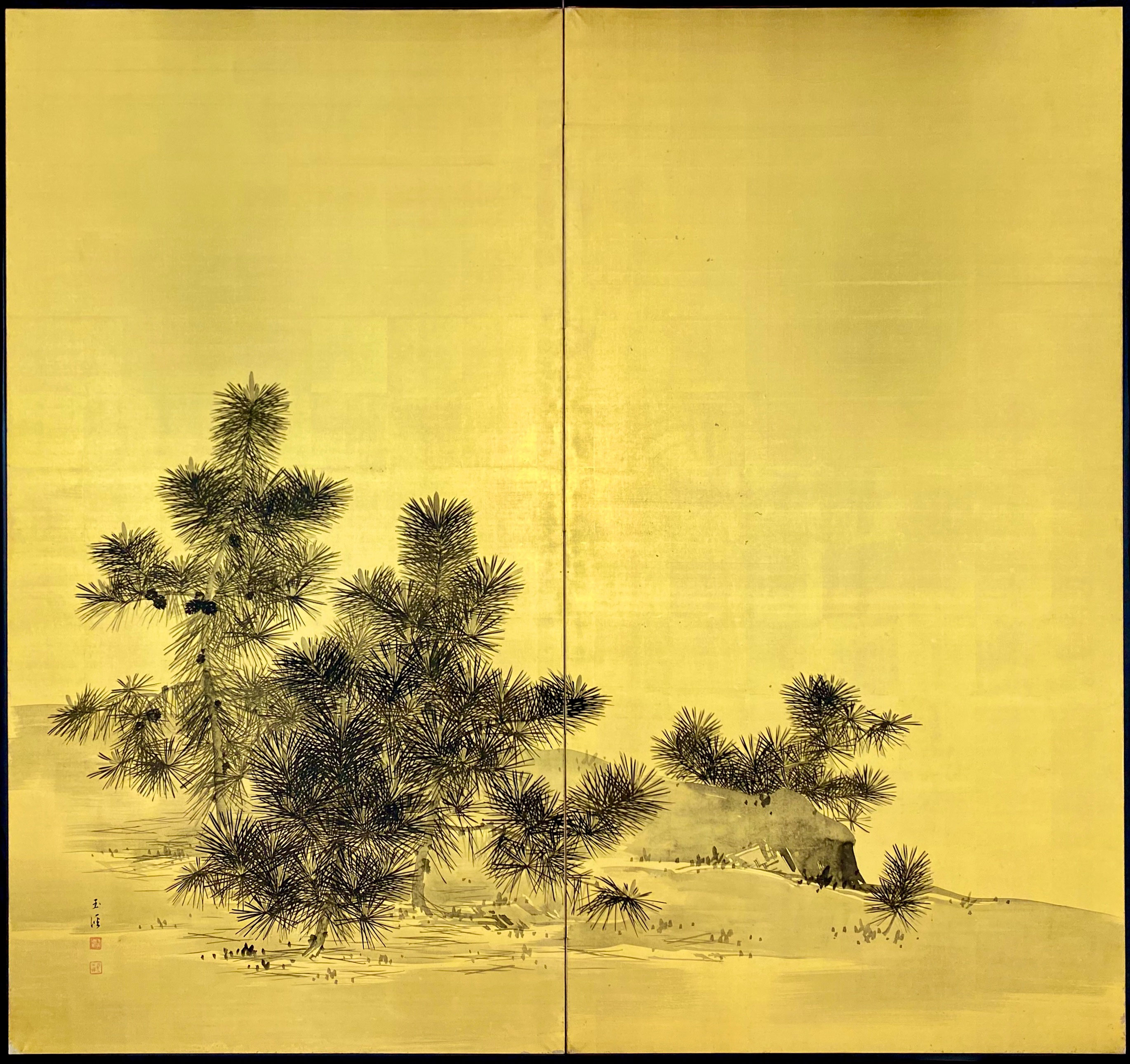
Pair of Painted Screens with Pines, ca. 1905–1910

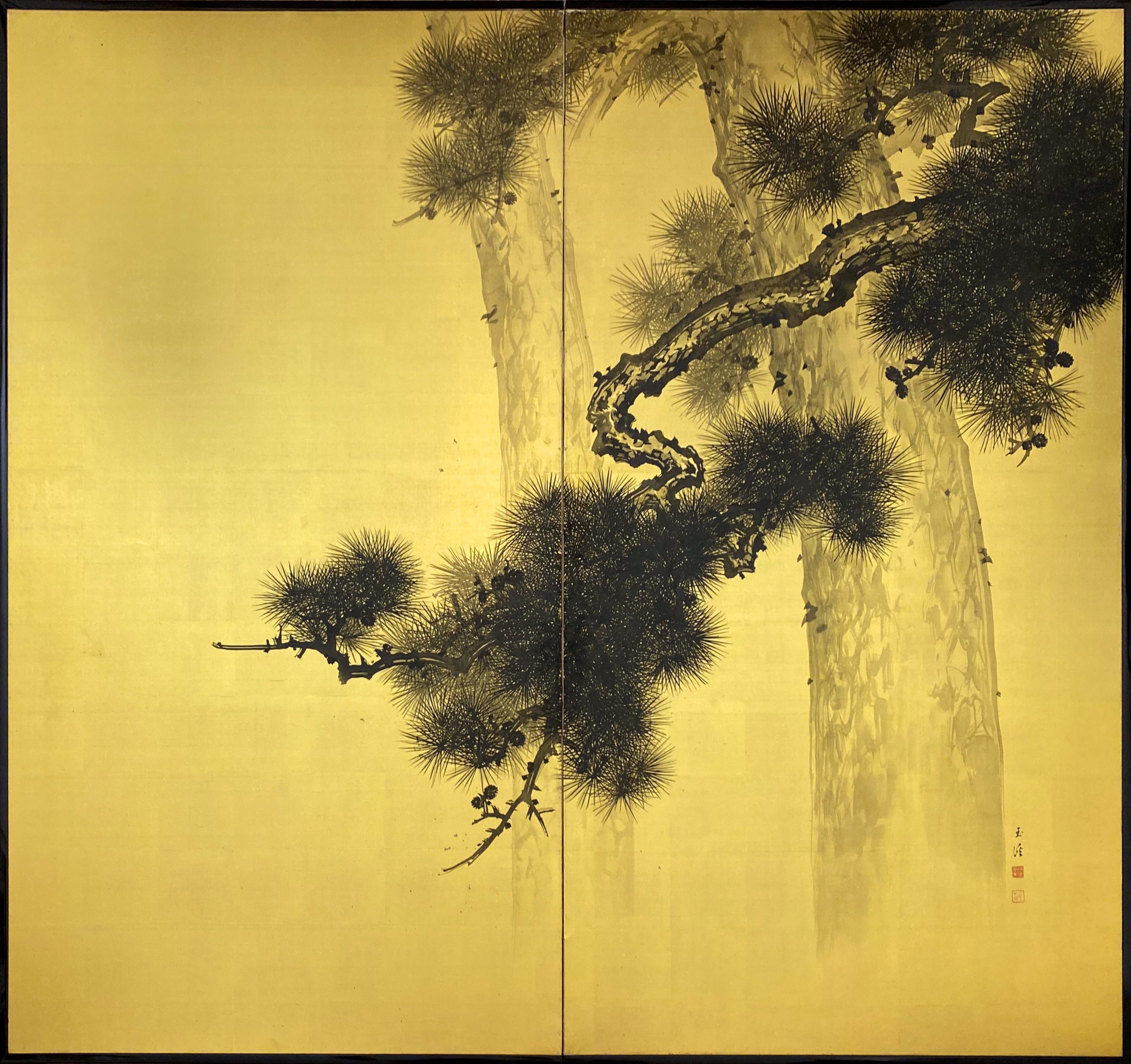

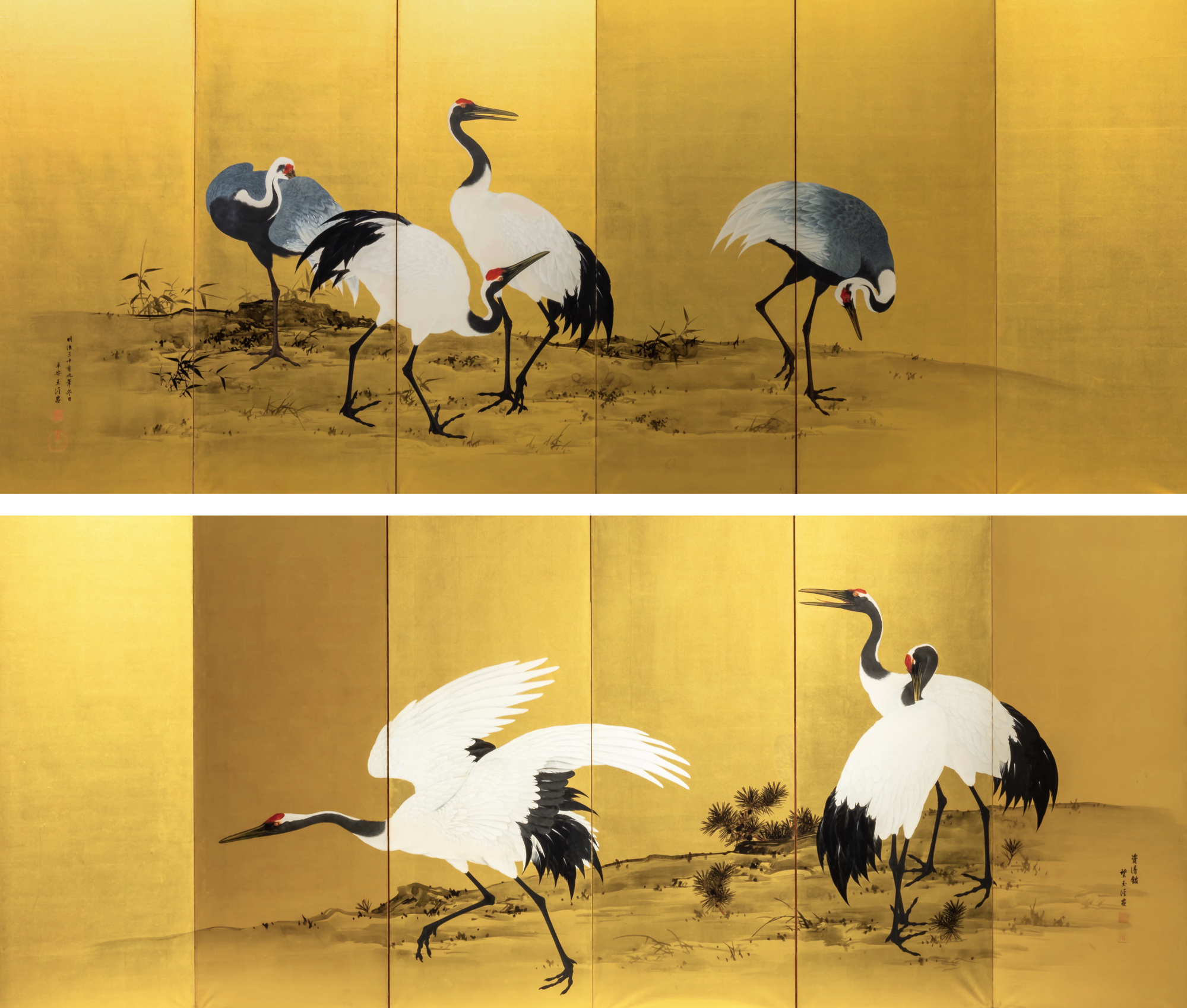
Pair of Painted Screens with a Flock of Cranes, 1906

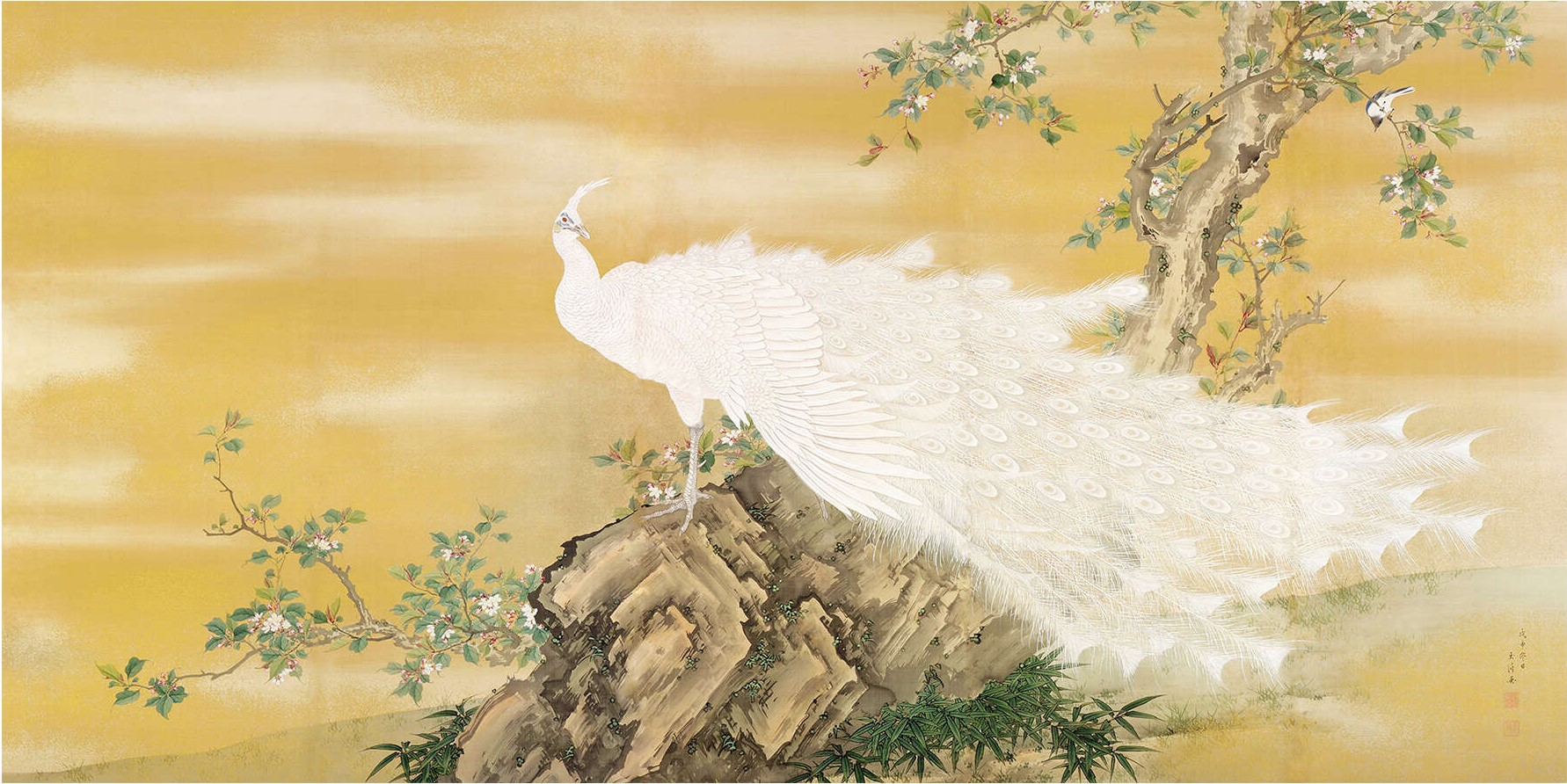
White Peafowl, 1908

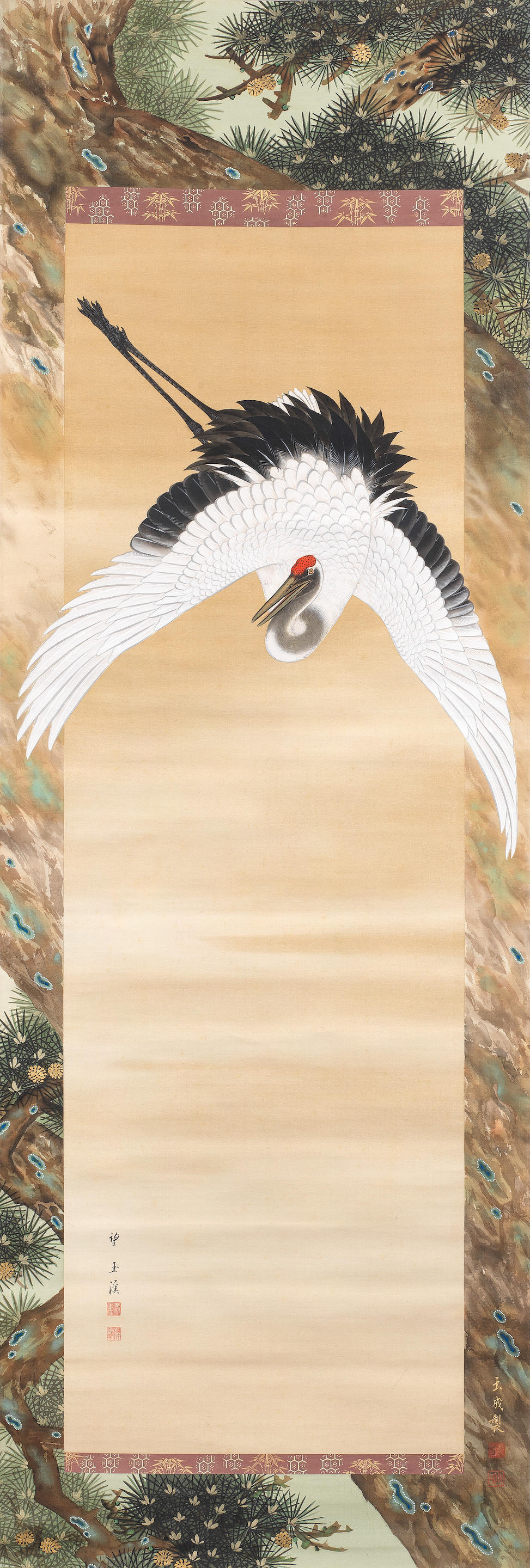
Crane over Pine, c. 1934

== Mochizuki Gyokusei (1900–1951) ==
Mochizuki Gyokusei, the sixth-generation artist of the school, was born in Kyoto and studied under his father, then in Kyoto City School of Arts and The Crafts and Kyoto City Specialist School of Painting, and after that with Nishiyama Suishō. He participated in Teiten and Nihon Bijutsu Kyōkai-ten exhibitions. He became a professor.

== Later generations ==
Mochizuki Gyokusen (born in 1943) is a lacquer artist and a professor of Kyoto City University of Arts. In 2012, he was awarded with the Kyoto Prefecture Culture Prize and Distinguished Services Prize. His son, Mochizuki Gyokusen, was born in 1977.
