= Saya, Perm Krai =

Saya Сая
- Selo
- Location within Perm Krai Location within Russia
- Coordinates: 57°44′N 57°39′E
- Country: Russia
- Region: Perm Krai
- District: Beryozovsky District
- Time zone: UTC+5:00

Saya (Russian: Сая) is a rural locality (a selo) in Beryozovsky District, Perm Krai, Russia. The population was 275 as of 2010. There are 5 streets.

== Geography ==
Saya is located 30 km northeast of Beryozovka (the district's administrative centre) by road. Berezovaya Gora is the nearest rural locality.
