= Saya Mochizuki =

Japanese actress

- Born: July 27, 1976 (age 49)
- Occupation: Idol
- Notable work: Shutsudō! Minsuka-police.

Saya Mochizuki (望月 さや/沙耶, Mochizuki Saya; b. July 27, 1976 in Chiba, Japan) was a Japanese idol; she retired from her entertainment career in 2005 and now designs accessories. Her nickname is "Mocchi".

== Appearances ==
- She was the leader of the sixth generation cast of the late-night television variety show Shutsudō! Minsuka-police.
- She played Saeko Minami in the 9th episode, titled "Ep. 9: Exposed! The Demon-Filled CD" (transliterated from Japanese as "Abaku zo! Mamono ga Hisomu Shî Dî"), of the TV show Denji Sentai Megaranger.
- She was a poster model for the video games Metal Gear Solid 2: Sons of Liberty and Metal Gear Solid 2: Substance.
- She acted in the horror/thriller movie Noroime.
- She was in the TV shows 古都旅情サスペンス and 団地奥様パック旅行事件簿.
- She played 佐竹裕美子 in the TV show ねらわれた学園 [Narawareta Gakuen, School in Peril].
- More are listed in:
- She was the subject of multiple photo collections:
  - Ogata, Masashige [尾形正茂] (March 2000). Breathless Saya Mochizuki / 望月さや写真集 [Saya Mochizuki photo collection]. 東京 [Tokyo]: 光進社 [previously cited as Susumu Akira]. ISBN 978-4-87761-040-1. OCLC 676274192.
  - 望月, さや (December 1, 1999). 揺れる88cm ロスト・ラブ… せつない気持ち… 望月さや (VHS tape) (in Japanese). エイチエムピィ. ISBN 978-4-89392-388-2.
- Seika Furuhata played a character named Saya Mochizuki in: Kari kare (TV Mini Series). Starring Saki Aibu, Noriko Nakagoshi, and Takashi Sasano. Dreamax Television, NHK. 3 November 2015.
