= Saaya (novel) =

2014 novel by Subin Bhattarai

- Cover picture of Saaya
- Author: Subin Bhattarai
- Original title: साया
- Language: Nepali
- Genre: Romance
- Publisher: Fine Print
- Publication date: Bhadra, 2071 B.S.
- Publication place: Nepal
- English publication date: August 2014
- Media type: Print (Paperback)
- Pages: 242
- ISBN: 9789937887779
- Preceded by: Summer Love

Saaya is a 2014 Nepali novel by Subin Bhattarai. It published by Fine Print in 2014 as sequel to Summer love.

Bhattarai's third book and second novel, the plot concerns how the misunderstanding in Summer love cleared and how they convince their family. It was a best selling book in Nepal and it was reprinted in the same month August, and was one of the best-selling books in the country for the year. The book was launched by actresses Garima Panta and Keki Adhikari, and author Bhattarai himself at Nepal Academy, Kamaladi.

== Synopsis ==
It is the sequel of Summer Love. It is based on point of view of narrator, Atit, Saaya and Susmita. According to the story, narrator takes the responsibility to mend the things between Atit and Saaya. Two years after the book about Atit's love story is published, the writer comes in contact with Saaya to know her story. Saaya says about her opinions and why she dissolved the relationship with Atit. She also says about physical relationship between Susmita and Atit. The narrator tries to know the fact from Susmita. Susmita also accepts what happened and also shows that there was Saaya's fault in Atit's poor mental health. Narrator with the help of Sushmita finally convinces Saaya that she should continue her relationship with Atit. Saaya also goes to live with Atit. After sometime, they both come to Nepal and have short talks with writer. Atit visits his hometown, Dhangadhi and also calls Saaya there. Atit's mother gives a Tilhari to Saaya as token of love. They have fun but soon Saaya has to go to Kathmandu for the engagement with Sujan, an NRN. Saaya succeeds in breaking engagement but her parents are angry with her. Saaya, Atit and friends go for trip to Goa. Later, they return to Norway. Saaya's parents also come to visit Saaya in Norway. During their visit, they find out that Saaya is married after seeing Tilhari. Angry and furious, Saaya's parents leave for Nepal. Saaya's health also deteriorates after the incident. Atit looks after Saaya. Saaya wills to go to her father but Atil tries to stop her and not come in her father's sweet words. Saaya goes to Nepal whereas Atit's condition degrades. He does not eat food and is always thinking about Saaya. Soon, Saaya calls Atit to Nepal. Atit finds Saaya's father ill. Saaya's father talks with him and says that they can live together in Norway and he didn't wanted inter caste marriage of Saaya only due to pressure of society. Saaya and Atit are united and this was all about their love story full of obstacles which they overcame successfully. The novel ends with Saaya asking narrator that he must tell about his love story the next time they meet.

== See also ==
- Summer Love
- Seto Dharti
- Phirphire
