= Summer Love (novel) =

2012 Nepali novel by Subin Bhattarai

- Nepali edition
- Author: Subin Bhattarai
- Original title: समर लभ
- Translator: Pratima Sharma
- Cover artist: Prinsha Shrestha (Model), Kishor Kayastha (Image), Subarna Humagai (Format)
- Language: Nepali / English
- Genre: Love story
- Publisher: Fine Print
- Publication date: 2012
- Publication place: Nepal
- Media type: Print
- Pages: 247
- ISBN: 9789937856386
- Followed by: Saaya

Summer Love is a Nepali novel by Subin Bhattarai published by Fine Print in 2012.

Bhattarai's second book and first novel, the plot concerns college students at the Central Department of Environmental Science (CDES) at Tribhuvan University falling in love. It was a best selling book in Nepal with in excess of 20,000 copies sold, and one of the best-selling books in the country for the year. Saaya is the sequel Summer Love Novel. Summer Love is now available in English. Pratima Sharma translated the book from Nepali to English.

A sequel titled Saaya was released in September 2014.

== Plot ==
Writer is on a cruise ship where he meets another Nepali person, Atit. As writer introduces himself, Atit asks the writer if he is willing to write Atit's love story. Reluctantly, the writer agrees to listen to his story.

Atit is curious to find out the entrance topper Saaya, who also has the same way back to home as Atit has. As days pass, Atit and Saaya become good friends and eventually, Atit proposes to Saaya. Saaya accepts the proposal. But the same day, both are them are divided into two different lab groups. One group has lab work in morning while other in afternoon. Now they have to come and leave college separately. After the division, Atit and Saaya start to bunk classes. Meanwhile Atit secures second spot after First Semester as Saaya helped him during exams. After finishing MSc, Atit has to go to Dhangadi as he secured a job in a NGO meanwhile Saaya; Norway, to pursue higher degree of education. One month later, Saaya returns to Nepal through Delhi and they marry. After some months, Atit goes to meet Saaya's parents to talk about their marriage but Saaya's parents decline as Atit is from Bramhin class and they are Newars. Saaya starts to move on while Atit falls in depression. With the help of Sushmita, his office's receptionist and neighbour, Atit does not commit suicide but they eventually have physical relation. Atit starts a search for Saaya and goes to Norway. In Norway, he meets Saaya and tells about the intimate relation he had with Sushmita.

In the end, writer shows interest in meeting Saaya and learning her side of the story. Atit gives Saaya's address but writer is unable to meet Saaya as she had gone to Kathmandu to write a thesis.
